= Toy Story 2 (disambiguation) =

Toy Story 2 is a 1999 animated film.

Toy Story 2 may also refer to:

- Toy Story 2 (soundtrack), composed by Randy Newman
- Toy Story 2 (video game), for the Game Boy Color
- Toy Story 2: Buzz Lightyear to the Rescue. the home console game
- "Toy Story 2", a 2023 song by Potter Payper from the album Real Back in Style

== See also ==
- Toy Story (disambiguation)
