= Toy Story: Retro Roundup! =

2026 video game compilation

- Cover art, featuring the covers from the included games (Note: Top to bottom: Toy Story, Toy Story 2: Buzz Lightyear to the Rescue, Buzz Lightyear of Star Command, Toy Story Racer, A Bug's Life)
- Developer: Digital Eclipse
- Publisher: Atari
- Series: Toy Story
- Platforms: Nintendo Switch; Nintendo Switch 2; PlayStation 4; PlayStation 5; Windows; Xbox One; Xbox Series X/S
- Release: October 15, 2026
- Genres: Platform, racing
- Modes: Single-player, multiplayer

Toy Story: Retro Roundup! is a 2026 video game compilation developed by Digital Eclipse and published by Atari. It includes several video games based on Disney and Pixar's Toy Story franchise and the film A Bug's Life (1998), originally developed by Traveller's Tales and Tiertex Design Studios between 1995–2001, in celebration of Toy Story's 30th anniversary. It also includes several quality of life enhancements and behind-the-scenes materials.

The compilation was released on Nintendo Switch, Nintendo Switch 2, PlayStation 4, PlayStation 5, Windows, Xbox One, and Xbox Series X/S on October 15, 2026. Physical releases were packaged with an enhanced port of Toy Story 3 (2010).

== Contents ==
Retro Roundup contains six different Toy Story and A Bug's Life video games in eleven total versions representing several game consoles and handhelds. All games support rewinding gameplay, save states, and optional visual filters. Players can choose between the NTSC and PAL versions of the original Toy Story on Genesis and Super Nintendo Entertainment System (SNES), as well as between the two ROMs on the dual format Game Boy Color (GBC) games A Bug's Life and Toy Story 2. Several features have been added to assist newer players, including "How To Play" guides that adapt the game's instructions for modern platforms and multiple languages, and a practice mode that lets players choose a level to practice and watch guided playthroughs. A variety of cheats can also be toggled, such as invincibility, unlimited lives, and unlocking all levels.

An in-game museum contains behind-the-scenes features, including design documents, marketing materials, and video interviews with Pixar's Jason Katz, Disney & Pixar Games' Luigi Priore, Traveller's Tales' Jon Burton, and Woody voice actor Jim Hanks. A music player allows players to listen to all six games' soundtracks, including the uncompressed music from the Windows version of the original Toy Story game.

Games in the collection
Title	Genesis	SNES	Game Boy	GBC	PlayStation
Toy Story	Yes	Yes	Yes	—N/a	—N/a
A Bug's Life	—N/a	—N/a	—N/a	Yes	Yes
Toy Story 2	—N/a	—N/a	—N/a	Yes	—N/a
Toy Story 2: Buzz Lightyear to the Rescue	—N/a	—N/a	—N/a	—N/a	Yes
Buzz Lightyear of Star Command	—N/a	—N/a	—N/a	Yes	Yes
Toy Story Racer	—N/a	—N/a	—N/a	Yes	Yes

== Release ==
Toy Story: Retro Roundup! was announced by Digital Eclipse and Atari on June 2, 2026, two weeks before the release of the film Toy Story 5. Retro Roundup! marks the first rerelease of the handheld versions of the games and of any version of the first game, and celebrates the 30th anniversary of the Toy Story franchise. Digital Eclipse had previously worked with Disney on other compilations, including The Disney Afternoon Collection (2017) and Disney Classic Games Collection (2019).

Retro Roundup was released for Nintendo Switch, Nintendo Switch 2, PlayStation 4, PlayStation 5, Windows, Xbox One, and Xbox Series X/S on October 15, 2026. A physical release is also available on the Nintendo and PlayStation consoles. While the digital version is available as a standalone purchase, physical copies were bundled in a two-pack with Toy Story 3: Complete Edition, an enhanced port of Toy Story 3 (2010).

== Reception ==
Reception

Aggregate scores
Aggregator	Score
Metacritic	79/100 (PS5); 70/100 (NS2); 76/100 (PC)
OpenCritic	54% recommend (Note: Based on 28 reviews.)

Review scores
Publication	Score
MeriStation	7.5/10
Push Square	7/10
TechRaptor	7/10

According to the review aggregation website Metacritic, the PlayStation 5 and PC versions of Toy Story: Retro Roundup! both received generally favorable reviews from critics, while the Nintendo Switch 2 version of the game received "mixed or average" reviews from critics. Fellow review aggregator OpenCritic assessed that the game received fair approval, being recommended by 54% of critics.
