= Jon Burton =

English video game designer

- Occupations: Video game designer; director; programmer
- Years active: 1989–present
- Employers: Traveller's Tales (1989–2019); 10:10 Games (2021–present)

Jon Burton is an English video game designer, director, and programmer. He is the founder of development studio Traveller's Tales and its parent company TT Games.

Burton founded Traveller's Tales in 1989. He worked as a designer on Puggsy, Mickey Mania, Sonic 3D Blast, the Lego Star Wars series, Toy Story 2: Buzz Lightyear to the Rescue and A Bug's Life, and has served as programmer for many of their early games.

== Career ==
Burton founded Traveller's Tales alongside Andy Ingram in late 1989 and served as creative director of the games. His first game as designer, Leander, was in 1991; next was Puggsy in 1993. The game enabled Traveller's Tales to expand the company and develop games with bigger companies. In 1994, Traveller's Tales developed Mickey Mania for Disney, initiating a long relationship with the company; Disney later hired them to develop tie-in games for many of its properties. Starting in 1995, Sega contracted the company to develop two Sonic the Hedgehog games, Sonic 3D Blast and Sonic R. He also served as director and lead designer of Crash Bandicoot: The Wrath of Cortex. Next, he was served as director, lead designer, and writer of the action-adventure video game Haven: Call of the King, which sequels to the game was planned to be a trilogy, but it was cancelled due to the game's commercial failure.

Burton announced in 2005 that Traveller's Tales would merge with Giant Interactive Entertainment to form parent company TT Games. He served as director of the Lego Star Wars series based on the toy line of the same name and the film franchise. In 2007, Burton and Warner Bros. Interactive Entertainment announced that they had purchased TT Games and Traveller's Tales for an undisclosed amount as part of their expansion into the video game industry. Burton also served as director for other Lego video games including, Lego Indiana Jones: The Original Adventures, Lego Batman: The Videogame and its sequel, Lego Batman 2: DC Super Heroes, Lego Harry Potter: Years 1–4 and Years 5–7, Lego The Lord of the Rings, Lego The Hobbit, and Lego Dimensions. In 2013, Burton wrote the original story for, produced, and directed Lego Batman: The Movie – DC Super Heroes Unite based on the Lego Batman 2: DC Super Heroes video game. Also, Burton worked as an executive producer for the Warner Bros. 2014 film The Lego Movie, as a co-producer for the 2019 sequel The Lego Movie 2: The Second Part and the 2017 spin-off The Lego Batman Movie, and as a producer of the 2015 war thriller film Man Down.

In 2017, Burton began uploading videos demonstrating programming tricks and early prototypes of games that he worked on to his YouTube channel, GameHut, and has since created a new channel called Coding Secrets for the same content, in 2020. In October 2017, Burton announced that he would be creating an unofficial director's cut of the Sega Genesis version of Sonic 3D Blast, which was released in December 2017.

In August 2021, Burton co-founded 10:10 Games, a studio developing Funko Fusion, after he left Traveller's Tales in 2019.

== Personal life ==
He moved to Malibu, California in 2013. Burton is a practicing Christian and included an Ichthys as an Easter egg in one of the tracks in Sonic R.

== Works ==
=== Video games ===
Year	Game	Role					Notes
Year	Game	Director	Designer	Programmer	Producer	Writer	Notes
1991	Leander	No	Yes	No	No	No	
1993	Bram Stoker's Dracula	No	No	Yes	No	No	
1993	Puggsy	No	Yes	Yes	No	Yes	
1994	Mickey Mania: The Timeless Adventures of Mickey Mouse	No	Yes	Yes	No	Yes	
1995	Toy Story	No	Yes	No	No	No	
1996	Sonic 3D Blast	No	No	Yes	No	No	
1997	Sonic R	No	No	Yes	No	No	
1998	Rascal	Yes	Yes	No	No	No	
1998	A Bug's Life	Yes	Yes	Yes	No	No	
1999	Toy Story 2: Buzz Lightyear to the Rescue	Yes	Yes	Yes	No	No	
2000	Buzz Lightyear of Star Command	No	Yes	Yes	No	No	
2001	Toy Story Racer	No	No	No	Executive	No	
2001	Crash Bandicoot: The Wrath of Cortex	Yes	Yes	Yes	Executive	No	
2002	Haven: Call of the King	Yes	Yes	No	No	Yes	
2003	Finding Nemo	No	Yes	No	Executive	No	
2005	Lego Star Wars: The Video Game	Yes	Yes	No	No	No	
2005	The Chronicles of Narnia: The Lion, the Witch and the Wardrobe	Yes	Yes	No	No	No	
2006	Lego Star Wars II: The Original Trilogy	Yes	Yes	No	No	No	
2006	Bionicle Heroes	Yes	Yes	No	No	No	
2007	Transformers: The Game	Yes	Yes	No	No	No	
2008	Lego Indiana Jones: The Original Adventures	Yes	Yes	No	No	No	
2008	Lego Batman: The Videogame	Yes	Yes	No	No	No	
2008	The Chronicles of Narnia: Prince Caspian	Yes	Yes	No	No	No	
2009	Lego Indiana Jones 2: The Adventure Continues	Yes	Yes	No	No	No	
2010	Lego Harry Potter: Years 1–4	Yes	Yes	No	No	No	
2011	Lego Star Wars III: The Clone Wars	Yes	Yes	No	No	No	
2011	Lego Pirates of the Caribbean: The Video Game	No	Yes	No	No	No	
2011	Lego Harry Potter: Years 5–7	No	Yes	No	No	No	
2012	Lego Batman 2: DC Super Heroes	Yes	Yes	No	No	Yes	
2012	Lego The Lord of the Rings	Yes	Yes	No	No	No	
2013	Lego Marvel Super Heroes	No	Yes	No	No	No	
2014	The Lego Movie Videogame	Yes	Yes	No	No	No	
2014	Lego The Hobbit	Yes	Yes	No	No	No	
2014	Lego Batman 3: Beyond Gotham	No	Yes	No	No	Story	
2015	Lego Ninjago: Shadow of Ronin	Yes	No	No	No	No	
2015	Lego Dimensions	Yes	Yes	No	No	Story	
2016	Lego Marvel's Avengers	No	Yes	No	No	No	
2017	Sonic 3D: Director's Cut	No	No	Yes	No	No	Director's cut
2024	Funko Fusion	No	Yes	No	No	No	

=== Films ===
Year	Title	Role			Notes
Year	Title	Director	Producer	Writer	Notes
2013	Lego Batman: The Movie – DC Super Heroes Unite	Yes	Yes	Story	Direct-to-video
2014	The Lego Movie	No	Executive	No	
2015	Man Down	No	Yes	No	
2017	The Lego Batman Movie	No	Co-producer	No	
2019	The Lego Movie 2: The Second Part	No	Co-producer	No	
