= Toy Story (disambiguation) =

Toy Story is a 1995 animated film from Disney and Pixar.

Toy Story may also refer to:

- Toy Story (franchise)
- Toy Story (soundtrack)
- Toy Story (video game)
- Toy Story: The Musical (2008–2016)
- "Toy Story", an episode of Disney's Magic Bake-Off
- "Toy Story", a 1999 episode of Just Shoot Me!
- "Toy Story", a 1997 episode of Life with Roger
- "Toy Story", a 1997 episode of Lois & Clark: The New Adventures of Superman
- "Toy Story" (Raising Hope), an episode of Raising Hope
- "Toy Story", a 2013 episode of The Exes
- "Toy Story", a song by David Guetta from Nothing but the Beat

== See also ==
- Toy Story 2 (disambiguation)
- Toystory (bull), a Holstein bull
- James May's Toy Stories, a British documentary television series
- "No Toy Story", an episode of Fanboy & Chum Chum
- "Troy Story", a 2013 episode of Phineas and Ferb
