= Buzz Lightyear =

Character in the Toy Story franchise

- Toy Story character
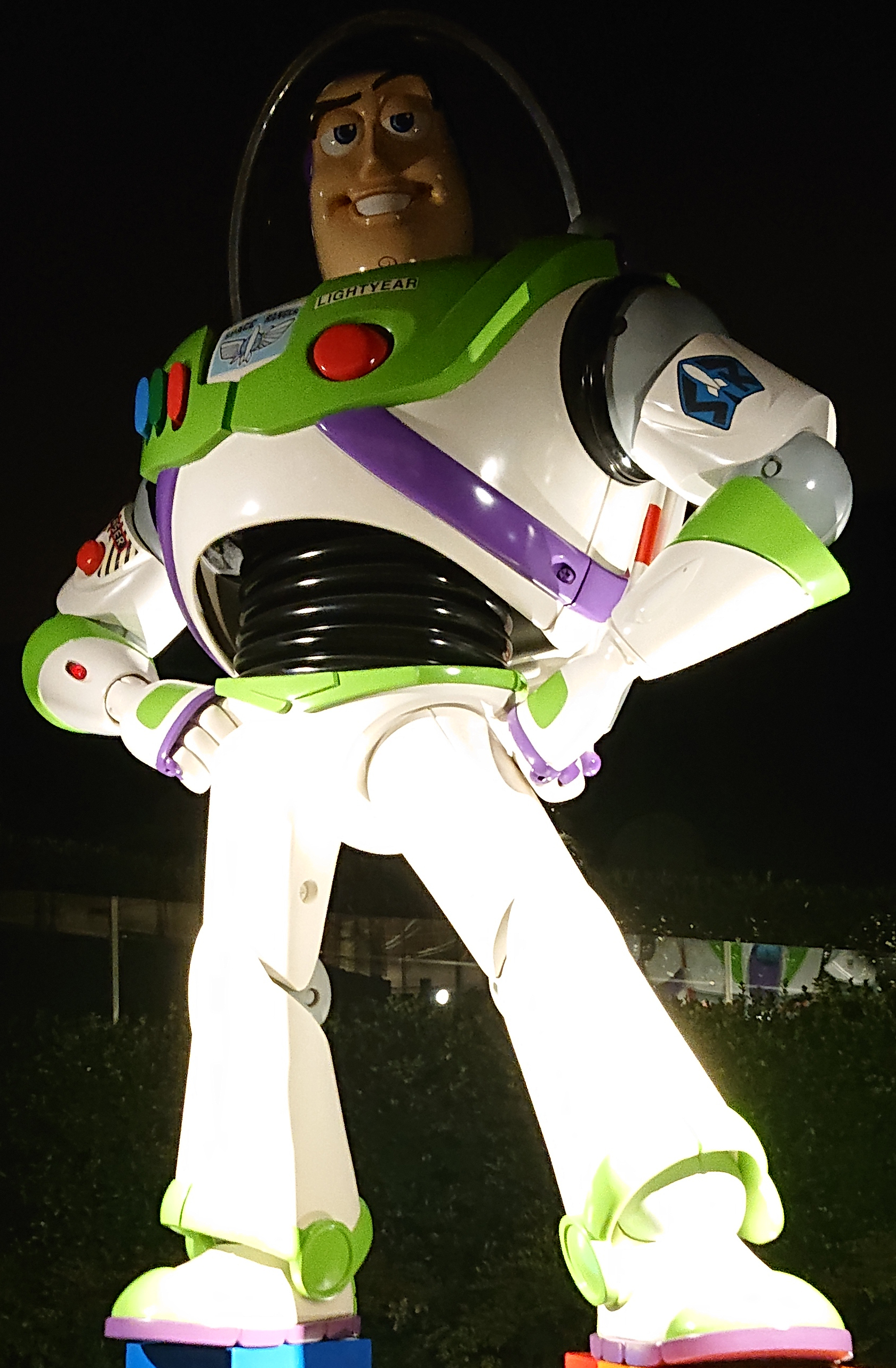
- Statue of Buzz Lightyear at the Toy Story Hotel in Shanghai, China
- First appearance: Toy Story (1995)
- Created by: John Lasseter
- Voiced by: Tim Allen (1995–present); Patrick Warburton (Buzz Lightyear of Star Command); Javier Fernández-Peña (Spanish mode); Teddy Newton (mini counterpart); Pat Fraley (Toy Story Treats, few video games, theme parks, merchandise); Mike MacRae (2010-present); Corey Burton (2010, Disney on Ice); Chris Evans (2022, Lightyear); James Brolin (2022, Older Buzz)

In-universe information
- Species: Toy (Toy Story film series); Human (Buzz Lightyear of Star Command and Lightyear)
- Gender: Male
- Occupation: Space ranger Second-in-command & deputy of Andy's, later Bonnie's toys Captain of Team Lightyear
- Spouse: Jessie

Buzz Lightyear is a fictional character in the Disney–Pixar Toy Story franchise. He is a superhero action figure from an in-universe media franchise. Buzz is recognizable by his lime green, purple, and white space suit. Originally intended as a one-man band toy named Tinny, he evolved into a space ranger action figure during the development of Toy Story, a decision made by director John Lasseter. He is named after American astronaut Buzz Aldrin, the second person to walk on the Moon. Buzz Lightyear is a recurring character in all of the Toy Story franchise's animated feature films, including spin-offs. In the Toy Story films, he is voiced by Tim Allen.

Although Woody serves as the protagonist in the Toy Story filmography, Buzz is a prominent character, with their rivalry and friendship being a fundamental aspect of the story. In Toy Story (1995), unlike most of the other toys, Buzz initially believes himself to be the "real" Buzz Lightyear and comes to terms with being just a toy. In Toy Story 2 (1999), he encounters other Buzz Lightyear action figures from the toyline who similarly believe themselves to be "real", including his in-universe archenemy and father Emperor Zurg. In Toy Story 3 (2010), Buzz explores a romance with cowgirl figure Jessie, while uncovering his Spanish mode. In Toy Story 4 (2019), he finds his inner voice and bids farewell to Woody, who leaves to be with Bo Peep.

The fictional character on which the toy Buzz is based also appears in the 2000 direct-to-video film Buzz Lightyear of Star Command: The Adventure Begins and its subsequent spin-off television series, Buzz Lightyear of Star Command. In these productions, he is voiced by Tim Allen and Patrick Warburton, respectively. Chris Evans voiced a version of the character in the 2022 spin-off film Lightyear, an in-universe film exploring his origin story, with James Brolin additionally voicing Zurg, an elderly, nihilistic version of Buzz from an alternate future.

Buzz received a positive reception on the release of Toy Story. Critics have described him as a pop culture icon and the greatest or most iconic Pixar character. He was named as one of the most influential toys of the 1990s by Time. His catchphrase "To infinity and beyond" has been described as one of the greatest film quotes of all time and he has been referenced in popular culture, including song lyrics by Beyoncé and Justin Bieber. He was named the "longest-serving astronaut in space" by NASA after a Buzz Lightyear action figure spent 15 months on board the International Space Station from May 2008 to September 2009.

== Development ==
=== Conception and writing ===
Toy Story originated in the 1988 short Tin Toy, an animated Pixar film about a tin toy and a baby. The film was so successful that Disney approached Pixar to develop more animated films from computer generated animation. A feature film was conceived involving a windup toy named "Tinny" who rivals a former favorite toy, a ventriloquist's dummy. Tinny was eventually converted into a spaceman and evolved through various design changes, eventually transforming into Buzz Lightyear. Disney entered into the joint project with Pixar, then a young production studio chaired by Steve Jobs, for three computer-animated feature films in a $26 million deal. The Pixar team working on the project included John Lasseter as director, screenwriters Andrew Stanton and Pete Docter, and Ed Catmull. In the early 1980s, Lasseter and his colleagues created short films at Pixar using computer software that was still being designed, but they had not yet produced a feature film. When Disney came on board with Lasseter's idea, they pushed for edgier characters. Lasseter recalled that this made them unlikeable: "The characters were yelling, they were cynical, they were always making fun of everybody, and I hated it." Worried about losing the deal with Disney, the Pixar team reworked the story concept within two weeks with the belief that toys could appeal to adults and teenagers. The new story centred around a boy named Andy, a cowboy leading a group of toys, and a space toy, and the film was greenlit by Disney. Lasseter named various influences on the story concept, including Star Wars, the space race, and buddy comedies.

This sketch of Buzz Lightyear shows him in an early design iteration as Lunar Larry.

The film's script went through various changes during development. The first draft was produced in March 1991 and followed Tinny, a one-man band toy, who is given to a boy as a birthday gift. The boy's family take Tinny on holiday but accidentally leave him at a gas station, where he meets the ventriloquist's dummy. From there, the two characters have to work out how to find their way back to Tinny's owners. After a series of adventures they find their way to a kindergarten playground where they are reunited with the children. By summer 1991, Jeff Katzenberg at Disney decided that it should be a buddy film in which two conflicting characters must learn to work together. In September 1991, the Pixar team drew up a new version in which the ventriloquist's dummy is already the favorite toy in the house and Tinny is introduced as its rival, which causes friction between the two characters.

=== Design ===
Further changes to the character followed during the development. Lasseter considered a one-man band toy to be an outdated idea and decided to change Tinny to an action figure, similar to G.I. Joe. He said, "we started to analyze what a little boy would get these days that would make him so excited that he stopped playing with anything else." G.I. Joe was Lasseter's favorite character in childhood, but later Tinny evolved into a space hero similar to Major Matt Mason. This character then went through various design iterations, initially named Lunar Larry, which was then changed to Tempus and then Morph, who wore a red space suit. Finally, the dummy character was redesigned into a stuffed cowboy doll named Woody and Morph became Buzz Lightyear. Buzz was designed to be the ultimate child's toy. Lasseter recalled, "We reached back to every favorite idea we could remember. And that of course had to involve outer space". The team knew that being a space hero, Buzz's frame needed to be strong so that it could endure through many space missions, so they designed him with many holes for screws and rivets so that it was clear how he was constructed. They took inspiration from other action figures, incorporating a "karate chop action" into the arms. Buzz was also designed with pop out wings with landing lights to give children the ability to make him fly and a blinking red light bulb on his wrist to act as a laser. A button was included on his chest, which provides digitised audio when pushed. The lime green and purple color scheme in Buzz's design was created by Lasseter while sketching the character and was chosen as an apology to his wife for working late; lime green was the favorite color of Lasseter and purple was his wife's favorite. The appearance of television actor Ed Kemmer was also an inspiration for Lightyear. Kemmer played Commander Buzz Corry in Space Patrol, one of the first science-fiction series on American television.

Buzz Lightyear was named in honor of Apollo 11 astronaut Buzz Aldrin, the second person to walk on the Moon. The film producers thought that Aldrin had "the coolest astronaut name". Aldrin acknowledged the tribute when he pulled a Buzz Lightyear toy out during a speech at NASA. Aldrin did not receive any endorsement fees for the use of his nickname. In 2009, he admitted to being exasperated by Disney using his name for the character: "You don't want to tangle with Disney, the friend of children. You don't want to challenge their lawyers – for sure, you're going to lose."

=== Voices ===
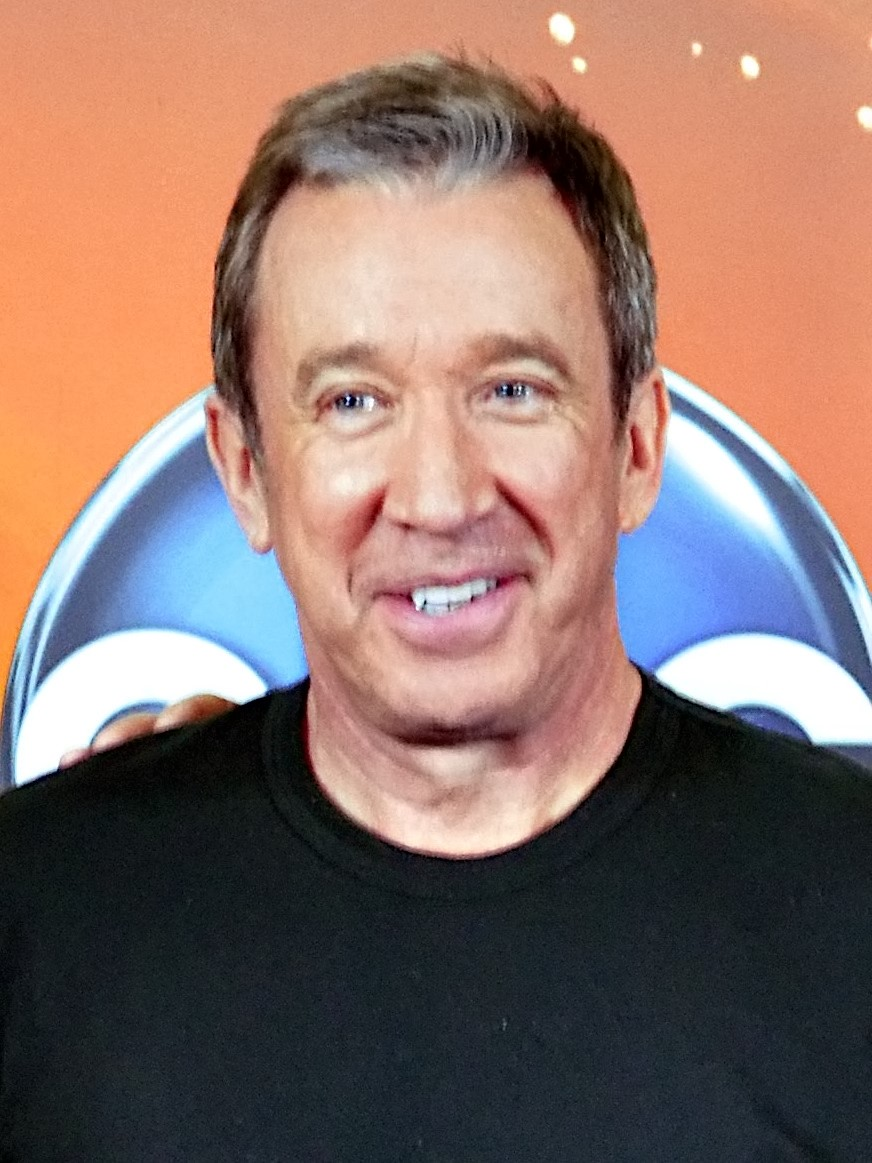
Tim Allen is the voice of Buzz Lightyear in the Toy Story filmography.

Originally, when a screen test was being made, Lasseter wanted Buzz to be voiced by Billy Crystal and used audio from the film When Harry Met Sally.... Crystal turned the role down, being of the opinion that he was the wrong voice for the character, but later said that the decision was the biggest regret of his career. Several other actors were considered for the role, including Bill Murray who turned it down and Jim Carrey. Several other candidates were also considered for the role of Buzz, including Chevy Chase, Michael Keaton, Kevin Costner, Bruce Willis, Dan Aykroyd, Matthew Broderick, Mel Gibson, Kurt Russell, Richard Gere, Wayne Knight, Michael J. Fox, John Travolta, Adam Sandler, Dennis Quaid and Jason Alexander. Tim Allen was cast due to Lasseter enjoying his standup comedy, as he wanted the character to be funny. The honesty in Allen's first reading for Buzz influenced Pixar to change him to a character who is unaware that he is a toy. Lasseter explained that casting Allen "gave us that quality we wanted of a macho guy with a soft underbelly. Tim's perfect at doing an everyday guy". For both Allen and Tom Hanks, the voice of Woody, it was their first time working on an animated film. Allen admitted that he was initially skeptical that the film would be successful as he thought it "too high tech" and too similar to a video game.

Allen continued to voice Buzz in all of the Toy Story feature films and also voiced the character for Buzz Lightyear of Star Command: The Adventure Begins, a spin-off released for direct-to-video in 2000. In addition, Allen also voiced the character in the animated short film series Toy Story Toons and in Ralph Breaks the Internet. Other actors have also voiced Buzz, including Pat Fraley who took on the role in the mid-1990s for various productions including Toy Story Treats, Toy Story: The Video Game, Toy Story: Animated Storybook, and Toy Story: Activity. Patrick Warburton also voiced the character in 2000 for Buzz Lightyear of Star Command, a 2D animated TV series based on the direct-to-video film. From 2008 to 2016, a show titled Toy Story: The Musical on board Disney Cruise Line featured Buzz portrayed by Noel Orput. In Toy Story 3, the Spanish version of Buzz was voiced by Javier Fernandez-Peña, who returned for Toy Story Toons: Hawaiian Vacation. In 2010, Mike MacRae began voicing Buzz in various video games titles, beginning with Toy Story 3: The Video Game, the Disney Infinity series, and up until 2019 with Kingdom Hearts III. Corey Burton portrayed Buzz in performances of Disney on Ice in 2010. Teddy Newton voiced a small Buzz character in the short film Toy Story Toons: Small Fry (2011). In the Simpsons short Plusaversary (made to celebrate the 2nd anniversary of Disney+), Buzz was voiced by Hank Azaria. Additionally, James Brolin voices an older version of Buzz in Lightyear.

Chris Evans was cast as the voice of Buzz for the 2022 animated spin-off film Lightyear. After being initially intimidated by the role, Evans said that he used Allen as his inspiration but did not want to do a "shameless impression". Instead, he tried to create his own interpretation of the character by lowering his voice tone while also making it a homage to Allen. Director Angus MacLane explained that his casting was intended to separate the more serious action hero version of the character from Allen's comedic toy version in the Toy Story films, which he described as "a little goofier" and "a little dumber". Lightyear was Evans' first voice acting role. He admitted that speaking Buzz's catchphrase "To infinity and beyond" was like "wearing someone else's clothes" and felt that the line belonged to Allen. The casting announcement caused confusion in the media and prompted Hanks, who had remained friends with Allen since the first Toy Story film, to question why he had not been recast in the role. Allen responded to the casting in June 2022, stating that he had not commented earlier as he felt that Lightyear had no connection to the original Buzz. He criticized the film for not having a closer connection to toy Buzz and commented, "There's really no Toy Story Buzz without Woody". In February 2023, Allen was confirmed to be returning to the role for Toy Story 5.

== Characteristics ==
Buzz Lightyear is a toy given as a birthday present to a boy named Andy. He is a space ranger toy with electronic features, including flashing lights and catchphrases and is based on a character in Andy's favorite film. Like the other toys in Toy Story, Buzz comes to life, but is unaware that he is a toy, instead believing himself to be a real space ranger. An in-universe television commercial advertising Buzz Lightyear toys promotes him as "the world's greatest superhero" and illustrates that Buzz is a toy based on a fictional character in a successful media franchise. His delusion is expressed immediately upon entering Andy's room, which he mistakes for a strange planet. He declares that he is stationed in the Gamma Quadrant of Sector Four and is tasked with protecting the galaxy from the Evil Emperor Zurg, the enemy of the Galactic Alliance. He explains to Woody that he must rendezvous with Star Command to deliver information on Zurg's secret weapon, which can destroy entire planets and that Woody is causing him to be delayed. As an action figure, Buzz has various features, including a space suit that glows in the dark. He also takes his heroic role very seriously and is prepared to face dangerous enemies by setting his "laser" from stun to kill. His earnestness is often used as a form of comic relief. Being the newest toy in Andy's room, the other toys, except for Woody, are impressed and treat him with reverence like a real space ranger. He is particularly convinced that he can fly and attempts to demonstrate this to the other toys in Andy's room. He often uses one of his catchphrases "To infinity and beyond" as a rallying cry when attempting a heroic feat. Despite initially being a figure of fun for Woody, he is often proven to be courageous and the calmer and more sensible of the two, making safer decisions that demonstrate his leadership qualities. Over time Buzz develops a deep friendship with Woody and their bond continues throughout the Toy Story films. He eventually discovers that he is just a toy, which leads to a personal crisis and moments of self reflection upon discovering other Buzz Lightyear action figures in a toy store. Buzz accepts that he is not a space ranger while helping Woody to reach Andy in a moving van, where he activates his wings to glide through the air and proclaims that he is not flying, but "falling with style".

== Characterization ==
=== In Toy Story ===
"He's always been wonderfully ignorant about who he was, that he was a toy. But his transition has always been, 'Okay, that was a terrible moment for me, let's regroup.'...his core has always been this little authentic soft-hearted [guy]."

— Tim Allen discussing Buzz Lightyear

During the development of Toy Story, Buzz Lightyear was conceived to be the opposite to Andy's favorite toy Woody. Writer Andrew Stanton explained that while Woody is an old cowboy doll, Buzz is a "flashy, new space ranger toy with all the gizmos". Their rivalry over their status as Andy's favorite toy is a fundamental aspect of the story, which Stanton said evolved into "a classic buddy picture". Stanton said that it took time to develop Buzz as a character, but it became easier to define him once the team framed him not as a superhero but as a cop. Directing animator Rich Quade said that this helped to choreograph the character. Buzz was designed to move bluntly to reflect how he thinks. Story artist Jason Katz commented, "the only universe Buzz patrols is in his head". Directing animator Ash Brannon said that structurally, Buzz is the opposite to Woody's soft, floppy physique. Except for his soft, squeaky head, Buzz is produced from hard plastic and this rigidity reflects his direct, unironic character. Commenting on Buzz's personality, Allen said he would like to have Buzz's innocence: "I wish I could look at things that simply". He said that in contrast to Woody, Buzz has a limited sense of what is real and this lack of consciousness is used for comedic effect. He noted that the dynamic between the two characters is what gives Buzz a personality, stating that his "sense of being" is created in the moment when he sees Woody for the first time. He described Buzz as being "linear" and "duty-oriented", but commented that when he eventually finds his "inner voice", it is "plastic, ...but it works for Buzz". Allen admitted that the character Duke Caboom presented a problem for him due to the similarities in his personality to Buzz's bravado. Consequently, he discussed the character with Keanu Reeves, the character's voice actor, who then made some changes to the character. In Toy Story 3, director Lee Unkrich said that the production team knew they wanted Buzz to switch from his usual state, so after some brainstorming, they decided that he would switch to a Spanish mode. As a result, his personality was changed into the form of a "Latin lover". According to Toy Story 4 director Josh Cooley, Buzz plays a pivotal role in Woody's story arc in the moment when he decides to move on in the final scenes of the film. He commented, "Buzz had to be the one who kind of gave him permission and said, 'You need to do this. This is for you.'" Producer Jonas Rivera described their relationship in this moment as "sophisticated" due to them having the ability to communicate without speaking.

=== In Lightyear ===
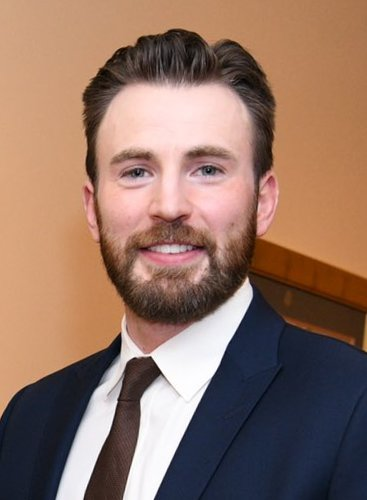
Buzz's characterization in Lightyear was influenced by Captain America, reinforced by the casting of Chris Evans.

In the 2022 spin-off film Lightyear, Buzz is characterized as the fictional character in the favorite film of the Toy Story character Andy, which the Buzz Lightyear action figures were based on. For Buzz's character in Lightyear, the Pixar team wanted to create a distinction between the heroic fictional human Buzz and the toy Buzz of Toy Story. Consequently, they needed to ensure he was both a dramatic and comedic character, rather than a character used for comic relief. He also needed to appear heroic without coming across as arrogant. Director Angus MacLane was influenced by his love of sci-fi action adventure films to imagine Buzz as he would appear to Andy in a blockbuster movie. Describing Buzz as a "cool toy", he considered Buzz's absolute confidence in himself to be the ideal comedic partner for Woody and questioned whether his backstory involving Emperor Zurg could be produced in film. Having worked as an animator on the first two Toy Story sequels, he decided that for Lightyear, Buzz's character trait was "a disagreement over the nature of reality", referring to Toy Story, in which Buzz believes himself to be a space ranger and Toy Story 2, where he believes that he is the Buzz Lightyear. Using his own personal experience of time passing at Pixar as his inspiration, he imagined Buzz rapidly travelling through time and consequently losing his connection to the important people in his life: "This felt like a natural fit for Buzz as a hero out of time, a well-worn story in the science fiction drama." He cited various influences on his depiction of Buzz's story, including Star Wars, Star Trek and Alien. MacLane framed Buzz in the heroic form of Captain America, reinforced by casting Evans in the role, but their personalities differed due to the Captain being a team player and Buzz being an isolated character. The writers gave Buzz a character to respect and admire in the form of Alisha Hawthorne and used this relationship to eventually show Buzz what he is missing from his life. MacLane explained that Buzz's catchphrase "To infinity and beyond" was used to emphasise the character's story arc: "His personal and moral failure is the realization that he isn't perfect, and the need to embrace his imperfections." He recalled that in Toy Story the catchphrase is a joke: "you can't go beyond infinity", but in Lightyear, it was used as a "secret handshake" shared with his friend Alicia. Producer Galyn Susman said that it had two meanings in the film, initially being about Buzz's next adventure and finally being "much more about being together and being here in the present." In the film, Buzz is transported to Zurg's spaceship, where he contemplates whether Zurg is his father, a reference to a comedic moment in Toy Story 2 that mimics a Star Wars scene, where Zurg tells a Buzz Lightyear figure that he is his father. Lightyear's story flips this by revealing that Zurg is really an older version of Buzz from an alternate timeline. MacLane realized that employing the same plot point as in Toy Story 2 would not have worked with audiences because it would be expected: "What we were really going for was the idea that Buzz's greatest enemy is himself, literally and figuratively".

== Appearances ==
=== Toy Story films ===
==== Toy Story (1995) ====
Buzz Lightyear, an action figure, is given to a boy named Andy Davis from his mother as a birthday present. He quickly impresses the other toys with his skills, flashy accessories and wings, and soon becomes Andy's favorite toy. Sheriff Woody, the former favorite toy, quickly becomes jealous. It soon becomes apparent that Buzz is unaware he is a toy, genuinely believing that he is a space ranger sent to stop the Evil Emperor Zurg. He further believes that his red light bulb "laser" is a deadly weapon, his wings are functional aircraft-grade steel, and that he cannot breathe with his helmet open.

After Woody unintentionally knocks Buzz out of Andy's bedroom window, Buzz follows and confronts Woody in Andy's car. The two become separated from Andy while fighting, and Woody tries to convince Buzz he is a toy but fails. The two are soon captured by Andy's sadistic neighbor, Sid Phillips. Buzz sees a commercial on a TV in Sid's house which reveals he is a toy. In denial, Buzz tries to fly and ends up breaking his arm. He falls into despair.

Sid's toys fix Buzz's arm, and Sid tapes him to a rocket with the intention to blow him up. Woody convinces Buzz his purpose is to make Andy happy; eventually causing Buzz to regain his resolve. He teams up with Woody to escape Sid and return to Andy. As the two pursue Andy's van, Woody is attacked by Sid's dog Scud. Buzz fights off the dog to rescue Woody, and Woody uses RC to rescue Buzz. When the two are still unable to catch up to Andy, Woody is forced to light the rocket and launch them into the air; Buzz opens his wings to sever the tape holding him to the rocket, saving them from exploding and flying solo for the first time, albeit, while carrying Woody. After they are reunited with Andy, Buzz and Woody remain close friends.

==== Toy Story 2 (1999) ====
Woody is kidnapped by a greedy toy collector named Al McWhiggin, who is intent on selling him and other "Woody's Roundup" toys to a toy museum in Japan. Buzz, having come to terms with his being a toy, leads Mr. Potato Head, Slinky Dog, Rex, and Hamm on a daring rescue mission. They travel to Al's Toy Barn store, to find Woody. Buzz uses traffic cones to help the group cross a busy road. In the store, the toys get separated. Buzz discovers an aisle full of his fellow Buzz Lightyear toys, one of which has a fancy Utility Belt. The Utility Belt Buzz comes to life and "arrests" Andy's Buzz and imprisons him in an empty Buzz Lightyear case. The other toys mistake Utility Belt Buzz for Andy's Buzz, who is forced to escape the box on his own. He pursues them to Al's apartment, but inadvertently frees an Evil Emperor Zurg action figure that is intent on destroying him.

Andy's Buzz rejoins the group, and convinces Woody to come home. Woody invites the other Roundup toys to come with them; Jessie and Bullseye agree, but Stinky Pete refuses and locks them in (and Buzz out) when they try to escape. Al reappears and takes Woody and the Roundup toys to the airport. Andy's Buzz and Utility Belt Buzz pursue Al into the elevator shaft with the other toys. Zurg confronts them, and reveals he is Utility Belt Buzz's father. Rex accidentally knocks him down the elevator shaft.

Utility Belt Buzz stays behind with Zurg, while Andy's Buzz and the other toys steal a Pizza Planet truck and drive to the airport. There they subdue Stinky Pete and rescue Woody and Bullseye in the baggage handling system. Buzz and Woody ride Bullseye onto the runway to rescue Jessie from the airplane before it takes off for Japan. The toys all return home in a stolen baggage cart. Buzz develops a crush on Jessie. He and Woody decide not to worry about Andy growing up, as they will always have each other as friends for "infinity and beyond".

==== Toy Story 3 (2010) ====
Woody, Buzz, and the other toys accidentally end up in a daycare center after Andy's mother mistakes them for trash while Andy is packing for college. Buzz decides that the best thing the toys can do is to stay together at the daycare, causing Woody to strike out on his own in search of Andy. Andy's toys are greeted by Lots-o'-Huggin' Bear who is seemingly the leader of the daycare toys. He assigns them to the Caterpillar Room, where they are subjected to a rough playtime by young children. Buzz approaches Lotso and requests a transfer to the Butterfly Room but rejects Lotso's offer to join his gang, resulting in Lotso ordering his henchmen to switch Buzz to "demo" mode.

Buzz's memories and personality appear to be erased; his space ranger delusions from the first film return. Lotso takes the opportunity to make Buzz think Andy's toys are minions of Evil Emperor Zurg. Buzz (now one of Lotso's sector chiefs in the rank of ADC) aggressively imprisons his friends (along with Lotso's Gang) and Lotso asks Buzz to explain to them they’re overnight "accommodations" he says that their required to sleep in their "prison cells", attend a roll call every dusk and dawn and not speak unless spoken to, Buzz also warns them that if they go against their will, they'll be punished by spending the night in "The Box" (which is the sandpit in the playground), when Jessie angrily cuts him off by telling him she understands, Buzz is about to subdue her for talking without permission, but Lotso stops him by saying that his friends are neutralized, but they'll say anything to make him doubt himself, Buzz tells his commander not to worry, because any doubt he had got pounded out of him at the academy. Buzz gets tasked to watch over the "prisoners" every night, while Woody returns to Sunnyside. Attempting to restore Buzz's memories, Andy's toys subdue him, but accidentally reset him to his "Spanish Mode". Woody manages to convince him that Andy's toys are his "amigos". Spanish Buzz helps the toys escape Sunnyside; making no secret of his love for Jessie. Lotso confronts them as they reach the dumpster outside the daycare. In the ensuing altercation, Lotso and all of Andy's toys are dumped into a garbage truck. Buzz rescues Jessie from the trash, but is crushed by a broken TV. Jessie breaks down in tears over Buzz's "dead" body, only for Buzz to awaken unharmed with his usual personality and memories restored.

At the landfill, the toys are pushed onto a conveyor belt. Buzz and Woody rescue Lotso from a shredder and help him reach an emergency stop button. Lotso abandons them and they fall into an incinerator. The three toy aliens operating a claw rescue them and they make their way home. Andy donates them all to Bonnie, a little girl Woody met at the daycare. When introducing her to Buzz, Andy describes him as "the coolest toy ever". As the toys settle in at Bonnie's house, Buzz performs a rumba with Jessie to the Spanish version of "You've Got a Friend in Me", to the amusement of the other toys.

==== Toy Story 4 (2019) ====
When Woody and Bonnie's new favorite toy, Forky, are separated from the group during an RV trip, Buzz, guided by his "inner voice", pursues them into a carnival. He is captured by a vendor and placed with other toys as a prize, where he encounters conjoined plushies Bunny and Ducky. They are initially antagonistic, as they believe Buzz has come to lower their chances of ever being won and owned by a child. The two refuse to listen to his explanations and become further enraged when Buzz frees them and himself from the game. Thinking they will now never be owned, they pursue and attack Buzz, until Woody offers to take the two plushies to Bonnie after Forky is rescued.

Buzz, Bunny, and Ducky join forces and are tasked with retrieving keys from an antique store owner to free Forky, who is trapped inside the store. They succeed, but the mission to rescue Forky fails due to the antique store owner's cat. After Woody and Bo Peep have a falling-out, Buzz's inner voice guides him to rejoin Andy's toys. Later, Forky is freed by Woody and reports that Woody and several other toys need rescuing. Buzz, Jessie and the others take over the controls of the RV and force Bonnie's dad to drive it back to the carnival.

Woody and Buzz meet up at a carousel and Buzz notices that Woody is heartbroken about having to part with Bo again. Buzz suggests that Woody stay behind to be with Bo, knowing that Bonnie will be okay even without him. They share a final goodbye hug and part ways.

==== Toy Story 5 (2026) ====
Buzz Lightyear remains with Bonnie as she becomes increasingly attached to the tablet Lily and begins neglecting her toys. After Jessie contacts Woody, Buzz is present when Woody returns and joins the group in responding to Lily’s influence over Bonnie. When Lily deceives Bonnie’s father into placing the toys in storage, Buzz escapes with Woody and travels with him to the farmhouse where Jessie has been taken. At the farmhouse area, Buzz encounters a group of high-tech Buzz Lightyear units that have crashed on a cargo ship and are operating in demo mode, believing they are real Space Rangers attempting to reach “Star Command” by following the North Star. Buzz engages with them and explains that they are toys, helping them accept their identity.

Buzz then works with Woody and the others to locate Jessie and counter Lily’s interference, including using Lily’s speech-recognition weakness by repeatedly calling out her name to trigger her system and reveal Jessie’s location to Bonnie. He later accompanies Bonnie and her mother to the Manoukian farmhouse, where Jessie is staying, and remains involved after Bonnie is influenced by ridicule from her classmates about playing with toys. Following Jessie’s renewed confidence after her connection to Emily’s past, Buzz continues working with Woody, Jessie, and the device-based toys. When Lily leaves on a donation truck out of guilt, Buzz joins the group in tracking her down and helps convince her to return and assist rather than interfere. He participates in arranging a meeting between Bonnie and Blaze, supporting their bonding through play, and at the end of the film he is present during their imaginative play while remaining with Bonnie as the stranded Buzz Lightyear units are adopted by different children at a school playground.

=== Buzz Lightyear spin-offs ===
==== Buzz Lightyear of Star Command (2000) ====
In the animated television series Buzz Lightyear of Star Command, Buzz Lightyear is a space ranger working for Star Command, protecting the universe from Evil Emperor Zurg. He works in a team alongside Mira Nova, a princess; Booster, a janitor; and XR, a robot. The series depicts a different version of Buzz Lightyear from his incarnation in Toy Story. It originated in the 2000 direct-to-video film Buzz Lightyear of Star Command: The Adventure Begins, which was written as an origin story.

==== Lightyear (2022) ====
In the Toy Story universe, the 2022 animated film Lightyear is Andy's favorite movie starring the fictional character upon which his Buzz Lightyear action figure was based. The film, which was directed by Angus MacLane, tells the story of young astronaut Buzz Lightyear (voiced by Evans) who, after being marooned on a hostile planet with his commander and crew and a talking robot cat called Sox, tries to find a way back home while confronting a threat to their safety.

=== Theme parks and shows ===
Buzz Lightyear is a meetable character at Disney Parks and Resorts, located in Toy Story Land. A dark shooting ride named Buzz Lightyear's Space Ranger Spin launched in 1998 in Tomorrowland in Magic Kingdom. Other versions of the ride located in other Disney parks are named Buzz Lightyear Laser Blast, Buzz Lightyear Planet Rescue, and Buzz Lightyear Astro Blasters. Buzz also makes a prominent appearance in the interactive 4D attraction Toy Story Mania! as a game host. He was originally intended to be excluded by Disney due to already appearing in the Astro Blasters ride, but Pixar insisted that he should appear, being an essential Toy Story character. He has also appeared alongside other Toy Story characters in Disney on Ice.

=== Video games ===
Various video games have been produced based on the Toy Story franchise. In 1995, Buzz appeared in the Toy Story video game based on the story of the first film. Buzz was voiced by Pat Fraley in the computer games Disney's Animated Storybook: Toy Story and Disney's Activity Center: Toy Story, both released in 1996. A Toy Story 2 video game was released in 1999, in which Buzz is tasked with rescuing Woody. In the 1999 game Toy Story 2: Buzz Lightyear to the Rescue, the player controls Buzz instead of Woody. In the 2010 video game tie in Toy Story 3, the player can play as Buzz in the Toy Box mode. In 2000, a video game titled Buzz Lightyear of Star Command was released that was based on the cartoon series of the same name. It features a playable Buzz Lightyear racing against enemies on different planets. A racing game similar to Mario Kart was released in 2001 with the title Toy Story Racer. In 2003, Buzz and Woody appeared in a skateboarding game titled Disney’s Extreme Skate Adventure. He also appears alongside Woody and the other toys in the 2009 shooting game Toy Story Mania!, a game based on the attraction in Disney parks. In 2013, a Toy Story in Space playset featuring Buzz was announced for the toys-to-life video game Disney Infinity. Woody and Buzz appear in the 2019 video game Kingdom Hearts III. In June 2019, Buzz appeared as a character skin with the other Toy Story characters in a Toy Story Mash Up Pack in Minecraft. In December 2022, Buzz and Woody were introduced in a content update to Disney Dreamlight Valley. In October 2023, skins based on Buzz and Woody were made available in the video game Fall Guys. In December 2024, Brawl Stars introduced Buzz Lightyear as a new playable character, available until February 2025. Additionally, a Buzz-inspired skin for the brawler Surge was released following the event. In April 2026, Buzz and Zurg were added as playable characters in Fortnite, with both characters having their proportions slightly altered to function as skins in the game.

=== Other appearances ===
Buzz appears in a series of television shorts titled Toy Story Treats, which aired in 1996 on ABC's Saturday mornings. A Buzz Lightyear action figure appears in a dentist waiting room in Pixar's 2003 film Finding Nemo. Buzz, Woody and Hamm appear as cars in Pixar's 2006 film Cars. He also appears in all three Toy Story Toons episodes Hawaiian Vacation, Small Fry, and Partysaurus Rex, and the two specials Toy Story of Terror! and Toy Story That Time Forgot. Buzz and Woody appear as piñatas in Pixar's 2017 film Coco. Buzz also makes an appearance alongside various other Disney characters in the 2018 Walt Disney Animation Studios film Ralph Breaks the Internet.

== Merchandise ==
Prior to the release of Toy Story, Disney offered a licensing deal to various toy manufacturers, including Mattel and Hasbro, but they failed to foresee the success of the film. In February 1995, Thinkway Toys, a small Canadian manufacturer, took on the deal within the tight timeframe. Albert Chan, president and CEO of Thinkway Toys said he saw the deal as an opportunity while many manufacturers considered it a risk to produce toys for the first CGI film. Lasseter explained that in the film, Buzz Lightyear was designed as a 12-inch action figure and therefore he wanted the same size for the real Buzz Lightyear toy. This differed from the standard 5 and a half inch action figures produced in North America. Chan had reservations about the size and price but was convinced to trust Lasseter's judgement. Anne Osberg, the president of Disney Consumer Products admitted that she had underestimated the merchandising potential of the Toy Story characters when compared to Mickey Mouse: "I saw Buzz as not competitive with Teenage Mutant Ninja Turtles". Due to the enormous success of Toy Story upon its release, Thinkway Toys was unable to meet the demand for Buzz Lightyear figures in the holiday season of 1996. With the assumption that Woody would be the most popular character, only 50,000 Buzz Lightyear toys were manufactured compared to 200,000 Woody toys. The supply deficit resulted in hundreds of shoppers queuing in the hope of purchasing a Buzz Lightyear toy and required the delivery of emergency supplies, with the BBC describing Buzz as "the year's most sought-after Christmas present". Although character sales from the film resulted in $100 million in revenue, Marketing Week described it as a "toy fiasco" for Disney, due to the estimated loss of $300 million in unrealized sales as a result of the "Buzz Lightyear drought". This was later referenced as an in-joke in Toy Story 2, in a scene involving Barbie giving the toys a tour of a toy store and commenting on the unforeseen demand for Buzz Lightyear toys. In subsequent years, sales of Buzz Lightyear figures remained strong. In 2010, with the release of Toy Story 3, over a million Buzz Lightyear action figures were sold. In 2019, Disney reported that their Buzz figure was the Disney Store's best-selling toy of all time in the UK. By 2022, Disney had sold more than 35 million Buzz Lightyears.

In May 2008, NASA and Disney announced that a Buzz Lightyear action figure would join the crew of the Space Shuttle Discovery on mission STS-124. The 12-inch toy remained on the International Space Station (ISS), where it took part in an experiment and appeared in a video downlink from space whilst the Space Shuttle delivered the largest module of the space station – Kibō, the Japanese Experiment Module pressurized section. The flight was arranged as part of NASA's Toys in Space program that began in 1985. The mission launched with Buzz Lightyear aboard on May 31, 2008, to celebrate the opening of Toy Story Midway Mania! at Disney's Hollywood Studios and Disney California Adventure Park theme parks. While on board the ISS, the action figure "ate" dinner with the ten astronauts and cosmonauts and was seen peering out of a window. It returned after 15 months on September 11, 2009, aboard mission STS-128, as it carried the Multi-Purpose Logistics Module Leonardo as its primary payload. Its return was celebrated in a parade led by Buzz Aldrin at Magic Kingdom in Walt Disney World. The Buzz Lightyear figure was named by NASA as the "longest-serving astronaut in space". In 2012, it was donated to the Smithsonian's National Air and Space Museum in Washington, D.C.

In 2009, Disney announced new merchandise for the Toy Story franchise, including an Ultimate Buzz Lightyear robot and the Lego Toy Story product line, which was introduced with the construction of a five-foot model of Buzz Lightyear built from 40,000 Lego bricks shown at the Licensing International Expo in June 2009. In July 2010, to coincide with the release of Toy Story 3, Lego released a buildable Construct-a-Buzz set and other playsets featuring a Buzz Lightyear minifigure. Buzz was also included as a minifigure in the 2016 Lego Disney minifigures product line. In April 2022, a series of Lego sets was announced to coincide with the release of Lightyear, including a buildable playset of Buzz's XL-15 spaceship. Buzz Lightyear has also been featured in numerous other licensed merchandise produced by various brands, including action figures by Mattel, costumes, clothing and accessories.

== Reception and legacy ==
Buzz was well received by critics upon his debut in Toy Story. Roger Ebert described him as "the most endearing toy in the movie" due to him being under the illusion that he is a space ranger, while noting the "poignancy" of the moment when he discovers that he is just a toy. In a review of the film for The New York Times, Janet Maslin considered the rivalry between Woody and Buzz as a highlight and praised Allen for "posturing manfully" in the role of Buzz. Leonard Klady of Variety also appreciated the emotional impact of Buzz facing up to his true identity. The Los Angeles Times considered Buzz to be "one of 'Toy Story's' pleasant surprises" citing his "self-absorbed and delusional" personality and his inability to realize that he is a toy. Owen Gleiberman writing for Entertainment Weekly found Buzz to be both "hilarious and touching", noting his egotistical and macho character and commenting, "His belief in his own superpowers, notably the ability to fly, is so complete that the very innocence of his self-delusion becomes oddly charming." Richard Corliss of Time highlighted that in Toy Story 2, Buzz finally achieves his destiny as an action hero by leading a team to rescue Woody. He described Allen's voice as "sweet doltishness" and commented that his "tinny" tone worked well in conveying an emptiness inside Buzz's head. Emily St. James writing for Vox found a moment in Toy Story 2 particularly funny when Buzz faces up to his previous delusion by coming face to face with another Buzz Lightyear that does not realize he is a toy and described it as a subtle way to illustrate the character's personal growth. Peter Debruge of Variety enjoyed the comedy in Spanish mode Buzz in Toy Story 3, describing it as "inspired". Tom Charity of CNN was also impressed by Buzz's transformation into a fluent speaker of Spanish, complete with flamenco moves and declarations of love for cowgirl Jessie, describing him as an "intergalactic toreador of love". In contrast, Austin Allison of Collider felt that Pixar struggled to decide what to do with Buzz in the Toy Story sequels outside of his identity crisis and being Woody's friend and opined that "the world built around him that fans and Pixar itself wanted to tell was too big for the stories of Toy Story to hold".

His starring role in Lightyear was met with a mixed response from critics. In an initial reaction to the film's announcement, The Guardian's Ben Child expressed bewilderment, commenting that Buzz had always been defined by his "toy-ness" since his first appearance and felt that it was impossible to expect an audience to reimagine him after several decades. Stephanie Zacharek writing for Time was "staggered" on discovering that Buzz Lightyear was not a toy but a movie character, "a case of commerce imitating art" and criticized the film's plot twist for causing the audience to have less sympathy for the character. Nicholas Barber of the BBC found Buzz's characterization in the film to be unsatisfying, describing him as "a lot less endearing than the swaggering lunk we know and love from Toy Story" and commenting that the writers had failed to define who he is. Vulture film critic Alison Willmore found Buzz to be the film's core problem, stating that, in Toy Story, he was a "deluded parody of the kind of one-note character that, as voiced by Evans in Lightyear, he pretty much just is". Film journalist Helen O'Hara wrote in The Guardian that it was just another example of an unnecessary origin story for a character that had already appeared onscreen "fully formed". Conversely, Alex Abad-Santox writing for Vox thought that the film successfully conveys the same character traits in Lightyear as the "daring, stubborn, strong" character previously seen in the Toy Story films. Justin Chang of the Los Angeles Times also appreciated that the character in Lightyear is recognizable as Buzz Lightyear despite having a human appearance rather than that of a toy and praised Evans for "channeling some of Captain America's get-it-done spirit".

Buzz Lightyear has been described by critics as a pop culture icon. He has been listed as one of the greatest Pixar characters. IGN stated that he "may be the most iconic of all Pixar characters". Charlie Green writing for The Guardian considered his entrance in Toy Story as one of the five greatest character introductions in film. Richard Fink of MovieWeb ranked him as the best Pixar character and cited his catchphrase "To infinity and beyond" as one of the "most iconic film quotes of all time". Yardbarker writer Chris Morgan also listed it as one of the most memorable catchphrases in film. In November 2014, the catchphrase ranked in top position in a Radio Times poll as the best film quote of all time. Time named Buzz Lightyear as one of the most influential toys of the 1990s, highlighting his cultural impact as a persistently popular toy and his involvement with NASA in promoting aerospace science to children. The 2008 song "Single Ladies" by Beyoncé includes the lyric "...and delivers me to a destiny, to infinity and beyond." Buzz Lightyear is mentioned in the 2012 song "Boyfriend" by Canadian pop star Justin Bieber in the lyric "I can be your Buzz Lightyear, fly across the globe."

== See also ==
- List of Toy Story characters
