= Toy Story 2: Buzz Lightyear to the Rescue =

1999 video game

- Promotional artwork
- Developer: Traveller's Tales
- Publisher: Activision (Note: The Windows and Macintosh versions were published by Disney Interactive)
- Director: Jon Burton (Note: Credits for the home console/computer version:)
- Producer: Peter Wyse
- Designers: Joel Goodsell; Jon Burton
- Programmer: Jon Burton
- Writers: Peter Wyse; Renee Johnson
- Composer: Andy Blythe; Marten Joustra
- Series: Toy Story
- Platforms: PlayStation; Nintendo 64; Windows; Macintosh; Dreamcast
- Release: 16 November 1999: Nintendo 64, PlayStation; NA: 16 November 1999; EU: 4 February 2000 Windows; NA: 22 November 1999 Macintosh; NA: November 1999; EU: 2000 Dreamcast; NA: 5 July 2000; EU: 17 November 2000
- Genres: Platform, action-adventure
- Mode: Single-player

Toy Story 2: Buzz Lightyear to the Rescue is a 1999 platform game developed by Traveller's Tales and published by Activision and Disney Interactive. Based on Disney and Pixar's computer-animated film Toy Story 2, it was released for Nintendo 64, PlayStation, Microsoft Windows, and Macintosh in late 1999, while a Dreamcast version followed in 2000. The computer versions were released under the title Disney/Pixar's Action Game, Toy Story 2. A different version, a side-scrolling platform game titled Toy Story 2, was also released in 1999 for the Game Boy Color. The PlayStation version has been re-released through emulation several times in subsequent years.

== Gameplay ==
Toy Story 2 puts the player in control of Buzz Lightyear as he explores areas based on and inspired by scenes from the film in order to rescue Woody. Buzz can attack enemies with a wrist laser, which can be charged up for additional power, and can also be aimed through a first-person viewpoint. Buzz also has a spin attack, which can be charged up into a continuous spin. Buzz is able to extend his wings to perform a double jump, and can perform a foot stomp to activate switches. The player can pick up a laser power-up that gives Buzz a limited supply of powered up laser shots, as well as health-replenishing batteries and extra lives.

The game features fifteen levels, consisting of ten main levels and five boss levels. Each main level has five Pizza Planet tokens hidden throughout the area, which are required to progress. Each token is earned by completing one of five objectives: defeating a miniboss, completing a puzzle or platforming challenge, winning a timed challenge or race, helping a character find five hidden items, or collecting 50 coins in a level and giving them to Hamm. Certain objectives require the use of a special power-up that must first be unlocked in a certain level by retrieving one of Mr. Potato Head's missing body parts. Power-ups include a cosmic shield that protects Buzz from damage, rocket boots that launch him at high speeds, a disk launcher that homes in on enemies, a grappling hook for climbing up high ledges, and hover boots for floating up to high places. While only one Pizza Planet token is needed to clear a level, boss levels require a certain number of tokens to unlock. Rex can be found in each level, and will offer hints to help players find and complete each objective.

With the exception of the Nintendo 64 version, progressing through each level unlocks FMV clips of scenes taken from the film. The Nintendo 64 version instead features screenshots from the film accompanied by text, shown in the beginning of the levels, due to storage limitations of the Nintendo 64 cartridge.

== Plot ==
The game's plot is relative to the Toy Story 2 film, and begins at Andy's house as Al McWhiggin steals Woody from the family's yard sale. Buzz Lightyear, Hamm, Rex, Slinky, and Mr. Potato Head venture out to find and rescue Woody. After leaving Andy's house, the toys enter the neighborhood in which Andy lives, then proceed to Al's Toy Barn, the penthouse where Al lives and finally the airport terminal and tarmac where the movie ends. Stinky Pete (a.k.a. the Prospector) appears as the game's final boss along with two of his in-game henchmen.

== Development and release ==
In July 1998, Activision licensed the rights to create a video game based on Toy Story 2. The game was developed by Traveller's Tales and published by Activision. Traveller's Tales had previously developed the original Toy Story video game. The home console versions were released as Toy Story 2: Buzz Lightyear to the Rescue!, while versions for Microsoft Windows and Macintosh were released under the title Disney/Pixar's Action Game, Toy Story 2. Development had been underway for some time as of March 1999.

The PlayStation and Nintendo 64 versions were unveiled at the Electronic Entertainment Expo in May 1999. The game was released in United States in November 1999, for the PlayStation, Nintendo 64, Windows, and Macintosh, coinciding with the film's theatrical release. In Europe, the PlayStation and Nintendo 64 versions were released on 4 February 2000. A port for the Dreamcast was intended to launch in March 2000, but was delayed and ultimately released in the U.S. the following July.

Following its initial release, the game created controversy for its inclusion of a villain character whose design featured a mustache, a bullet bandolier and a sombrero. In late November 1999, a peaceful protest with more than 120 people was held outside Activision's headquarters by Mestizo activists who perceived the character as an offensive stereotype towards Mexicans. Activision and Disney stated that the character's appearance would be altered in future copies of the game; there were no plans to recall or amend current copies.

=== Re-releases ===
In March 2011, Toy Story 2: Buzz Lightyear to the Rescue! was re-released as a PS one Classic on the PlayStation Store on PlayStation 3 and PlayStation Portable consoles. This release was made compatible with PlayStation Vita for Europe in August 2012 and the U.S. in January 2013. The PlayStation version was further re-released in May 2022 as a downloadable game for PlayStation 4 and PlayStation 5 and was re-released again in 2026 as part of the Toy Story: Retro Roundup! compilation.

== Reception ==
Reception

Aggregate score
Aggregator	Score			
Aggregator	Dreamcast	N64	PC	PS
Metacritic	57/100	58/100		75/100

Review scores
Publication	Score			
Publication	Dreamcast	N64	PC	PS
CNET Gamecenter	7/10	5/10	6/10	6/10
Electronic Gaming Monthly	5/10			7.88/10 (Note: Four critics of Electronic Gaming Monthly gave the PlayStation version 8/10, 7.5/10, 7/10, and 9/10.)
EP Daily	5/10			6.5/10
Game Informer	7/10	7.5/10		8/10
GameFan	47%	70% (Note: In GameFan's viewpoint of the Nintendo 64 version, three critics gave it each a score of 76, 61, and 73.) (L.B.) 57%		
GameRevolution	C	D		C+
GameSpot	5.9/10	6.5/10		7.1/10
GameSpy	6.5/10			
IGN	6/10	5.9/10		7/10
Next Generation	1/5			
Nintendo Power		7.1/10		
Official U.S. PlayStation Magazine				3/5
PC Zone			55%	
Entertainment Weekly			C	A

The PlayStation version of Toy Story 2: Buzz Lightyear to the Rescue! received positive reviews, while the Nintendo 64 and Dreamcast versions received "Mixed or average reviews", according to aggregating review website Metacritic. Nintendo Official Magazine, reviewing the Nintendo 64 release, called it "a smart platformer that's packed with wacky worlds and cool bosses", but also stated its low difficulty level may deter experienced gamers of the platform genre. Dr. Zombie of GamePro felt the game "stands on its own merits as an entertaining platform game".

The home console and computer versions were criticized for its awkward camera, (Note: Attributed to multiple sources) and the limited number of repetitive phrases used by non-playable characters. (Note: Attributed to multiple sources) Critics praised the PlayStation version for its graphics and FMV clips, and considered it superior to the Nintendo 64 version, noting its lack of clips. (Note: Attributed to multiple sources) John Marrin of CNET Gamecenter called the PlayStation version "a good 3D platformer that could have been better", enjoying the level design and cutscenes but criticizing the obstacles courses. Levi Buchanan of GameFan called the PlayStation version "a wonderfully detailed" game with "bright, crisp graphics, incredible audio, and some fantastic movie cutscenes", and criticized the Nintendo 64 version for blurry textures, "abysmal" pop-up, and the frame rate affecting character animations, as well as the sounds, music, and sluggish camera. Nintendo Official Magazine appreciated the Nintendo 64 release's upbeat music, vibrant color palette of the levels as well as the "smart" boss design, but admitted the graphics looked "grainy" in some areas. Matt Casamassina of IGN also criticized the Nintendo 64 version's pop-up and frame rate, and felt it had "washed out visuals and a decidedly blurry look" as well as inferior controls. Chris Hudak of The Electric Playground praised the game's large levels but criticized them for not being interactive enough.

Critics for Game Informer reviewed the PlayStation version and praised the FMV cutscenes and levels, but criticism was directed at the repetitive gameplay. Game Informer praised the "enjoyable" gameplay of the Nintendo 64 version, but also considered it to be monotonous and too easy, while criticizing the lack of cutscenes. AllGame's Brett Alan Weiss gave the PlayStation version three-and-a-half stars out of five, praising it for the camera, controls, level design, and the cutscenes, and stated that the character voices, "though redundant, are a plus". However, he considered the game too easy for hardcore gamers. Glenn Wigmore of AllGame also gave the Nintendo 64 version three-and-a-half stars out of five and praised it for its graphics, sound effects, and control, but was critical of the game's music, considering it to be repetitive. N64 Magazine gave the same console version 71% in two separate reviews, with Jes Bickham saying of the U.S. import, "It's probably more suited to the younger player, but Toy Story 2 is still a sweet little surprise" (#37, January 2000); and Tim Weaver later saying of the game in its verdict, "Likeable and imaginative, Toy Story 2 ranks along the ranks of Rayman 2 and 40 Winks as a solid, hard-working 3D adventure. Shame about the shocking PAL conversion, mind" (#39, March 2000).

The Dreamcast version was criticized for its difficult controls, including the overly sensitive analog stick, making it difficult to move Buzz in a straight line. Miguel Lopez of GameSpot believed the Dreamcast version had "cleaner-looking" FMV clips but was disappointed that it was essentially the same game as the Nintendo 64 and PlayStation versions, while IGN's Jeremy Dunham believed that the Dreamcast version had better graphics than the previous versions. 2 Barrel Fugue of GamePro criticized the Dreamcast version for its graphics and monotonous music. (Note: GamePro gave the Dreamcast version two 3/5 scores for graphics and sound, 2/5 for control, and 1.5/5 for fun factor.) Jeremy Bell of AllGame gave the same console version one-and-a-half stars out of five, calling it a "generic-looking dud" and considering the cutscenes to be the game's only "quality graphics". Bell criticized the game graphics for monotonous scenery and bland surface textures and stated that the game had low resolution considering it was developed for the Dreamcast. Bell also criticized the unoriginal gameplay. PlanetDreamcast praised the game's film clips, but criticized its VMU interface, and stated that the game would only appeal to young children. Greg Orlando of NextGen called the Dreamcast version a "shoddy port" with graphics "barely better" than the PlayStation version, while Shaun Conlin of The Electric Playground called it "a port of a game that wasn't very good in the first place". Scott Steinberg of CNET Gamecenter gave a positive review, writing, "Marred by a dodgy interface, Toy Story 2 nonetheless knows how to flex its might like a championship weightlifter. Candy-coated, addictive platform escapades for both kids and grownups are the return on your investment. Especially when weighed against the cost of movie tickets for a family of four, this disc comes out smelling like a rose."

Noah Robischon of Entertainment Weekly criticized the Windows version for installation problems. PC Zone wrote that while the game did not reinvigorate the platform genre, it was "definitely a cut above most merchandising tie-ins". Peyton Gaudiosi of CNET Gamecenter wrote that the same PC version, "with all its gadgets and gizmos, is all about fun, and with some patience on your part, this game will deliver on that score. It may not be worth a second replay, but this game has enough packed into it to make it worth a first adventure." Cathy Lu of MacADDICT reviewed the Macintosh version and considered it to be addictive. Lu praised the graphics but criticized clipping problems and the jerky camera, as well as high system requirements to play the game.

It was among the top 10 best-selling PlayStation games of December 1999. The PlayStation version received a "Gold" sales award from the Entertainment and Leisure Software Publishers Association (ELSPA), indicating sales of at least 200,000 units in the UK. During the 3rd Annual Interactive Achievement Awards, the Academy of Interactive Arts & Sciences nominated Toy Story 2 for the "Console Children's/Family Title of the Year" award.

== See also ==
- List of Disney video games
