= Rascal (video game) =

1998 video game

- North American box art
- Developer: Traveller's Tales
- Publisher: Psygnosis
- Director: Jon Burton
- Producer: Chris Rowley
- Designer: Jon Burton
- Programmers: Dave Dootson; Paul Houbart; Gary Ireland
- Artists: Beverly Bush; James Cunliffe; Sean Naden
- Composer: Andy Blythe; Marten Joustra
- Platform: PlayStation
- Release: NA: 24 March 1998; EU: 27 March 1998; JP: 18 March 1999
- Genre: Platform
- Mode: Single-player

Rascal is a 1998 platform video game developed by Traveller's Tales and published by Psygnosis for the PlayStation. The main character and several enemies were designed by Jim Henson's Creature Shop.

The player takes control of a mischievous boy who travels through time to rescue his father, armed only with a "Bubble Gun". The game met with uniformly negative reviews which cited poor camera work and needlessly cumbersome controls.

== Plot ==
Professor Casper Clockwise is in his lab making the final adjustments to his time-traveling device when someone creeps behind him. Meanwhile, his son Callum "Rascal" Clockwise is walking through a secret route under the house to get to his father's lab. The lights go out and an alarm sounds. Rascal rushes down to see the problem, but two aliens in spacecraft appear and chase him down the corridor.

Rascal makes it to his father's lab by going through the safe door entrance. He finds Chronon, the evil master of time, holding his father hostage with another of his dad's inventions called the "Bubble Gun". Chronon accidentally activates the controls for the time machine, and he and the Professor are sucked into the time portal. The Bubble Gun drops from it and lands at the feet of Rascal. He picks it up, vowing to save his father.

Rascal chases the two through the timestream, from the medieval Castle Hackalott to the Aztec Temple at Chichimeca, to the lost city of Atlantis, to the Jolly Raider pirate ship and Dodgy City in the old West, traveling to each location's past and present forms and collecting the pieces of a Time Clock from both before fighting Chronon in each area's future. Rascal travels to the Corridors of Time, Chronon's lair within the space-time continuum, where, after defeating its guardians brought from each of the other time periods, he defeats Chronon and rescues his father. After escaping using another time portal that leads back into the hallway of Rascal's house, Rascal and his father return safely back home, leaving the portal to shatter apart on Chronon, trapping him within interdimensional time forever.

== Gameplay ==
In the game, the player assumes the role of Rascal armed with the Bubble Gun, in a mission through five worlds - Castle Hackalott (a medieval castle), Chichimeca Temple (an ancient Aztec temple), the aquatic city of Atlantis, The Jolly Raider (a pirate ship), and Dodgy City (a town in the Wild West). Each world has three forms: past, present, and future (e.g. Castle Hackalott appears as a medieval castle in the past while in the present day, it has become a museum). The player needs only to complete the past level to gain access to the next world. In each past and present level, the player has to find the six pieces of the Time Clock (some of which are held by certain enemies) in order to access the Time Bubble and complete the level, in turn unlocking the next form of that world. Each future level has a boss battle against Chronon and defeating him in all five gives access to the final world. The Bubble Gun has limited ammo, and the range and strength of the bubbles depends on how much ammo is left. In most levels, minor enemies will spawn from Time Bubbles over time (usually those to do with the level theming itself) and when defeated, they will leave behind various items such as Bubble Gun ammo (in either green or red; the latter can temporarily grant the bubbles with homing capabilities), hearts that will restore health and "Chronon's Gift" (a red skull and crossbones) which will cause damage to the player if picked up.

== Development ==
The game was showcased at E3 1997. Traveller's Tales founder Jon Burton revealed in a video posted in September 2018, that the poor controls were a result of the publisher requesting that the controls be changed from directional movement to tank controls similar to Tomb Raider, leading to issues with how the game's camera engine was designed. Burton also claimed his involvement in the game was limited due to being preoccupied with Sonic R and that effectively made the publisher in charge.

== Reception ==
Reception

Aggregate score
Aggregator	Score
GameRankings	49%

Review scores
Publication	Score
AllGame	1.5/5
CNET Gamecenter	2/10
Edge	5/10
Electronic Gaming Monthly	3.625/10 (Note: Two critics of Electronic Gaming Monthly gave the game each a score of 4/10, one gave it 3.5/10, and the other gave it 3/10.)
Famitsu	22/40
Game Informer	6/10
GameRevolution	B−
GameSpot	4/10
IGN	2/10
Next Generation	2/5
PlayStation Official Magazine – UK	5/10

The game received generally unfavorable reviews. Critics widely praised the graphics, but also unanimously concluded that they are overridden by the game's weaknesses on every other front. Next Generation said that Rascal was "more of a technological achievement (one of the only PlayStation games with no noticeable load time) than a game, and worth picking up only for those who enjoy being annoyed." Critics often bemoaned the controls, with IGN explaining that while having controls operate relative to the player character's position works in first-person shooter games, platformers require more immediate control of the character in order to elude enemies. Next Generation noted that the lack of a strafe button compounds the problem by requiring the player to constantly turn their character to maneuver around bosses.

However, the most widespread criticism was with the game camera. GameSpot noted that objects behind the player character often obscure the view of what lies ahead, while GamePro said that whenever the player character stops, the camera moves in so tightly that the player cannot see nearby enemies and obstacles. GamePro concluded that "only the most forgiving gamers will stick with this title after a brief play." (Note: GamePro gave the game 4.5/5 for graphics, 1.5/5 for control, 2.5/5 for fun factor, and 3.5/5 for sound.) Additionally criticizing the game for inconsistent camera angles and level design which is straightforward to the point of being dull, Dan Hsu of Electronic Gaming Monthly summed up, "Rascal combines poor camera work with horrible controls to give us one of the worst 3D platforming experiences yet."

Rascal held a 49% on the review aggregation website GameRankings, based on five reviews.

In Japan, the game was ported and published by Takara under the name of Bubble Gun Kid (バブルガンキッド) on March 18, 1999, almost a year after its U.S. release date.
