= A Bug's Life (video game) =

1998 video game

- North American PlayStation box art
- Developers: Traveller's Tales; Tiertex Design Studios (GBC)
- Publishers: PlayStation; Sony Computer Entertainment; Microsoft Windows; Disney Interactive; Game Boy Color: NA: THQ; EU: Activision; Nintendo 64; Activision
- Director: Jon Burton
- Producer: Dan Winters
- Designer: Jon Burton
- Programmers: Jon Burton; Dave Dootson; Gary Vine (N64); Stephen Harding (N64)
- Artist: James Cunliffe
- Composer: Andy Blythe; Marten Joustra
- Platforms: PlayStation; Microsoft Windows; Game Boy Color; Nintendo 64
- Release: November 24, 1998: PlayStation; NA: November 24, 1998; EU: February 1999 Microsoft Windows; NA: November 1998; EU: February 12, 1999 Game Boy Color; NA: December 2, 1998; EU: 1999 Nintendo 64; EU: January 1, 1999; NA: June 1999
- Genre: Platform
- Mode: Single-player

A Bug's Life is a 3D platformer video game developed by Traveller's Tales. It is based on the Disney/Pixar 1998 film of the same name, with changes made to the storyline. The game was first released for the PlayStation in 1998, with ports to Windows and Nintendo 64 and a 2D platformer version for the Game Boy Color following months later.

== Gameplay ==
A Bug's Life is a platform game in which the player controls Flik throughout settings and a storyline based on the namesake film. The game is divided into five distinct "lands" consisting of three levels each. To complete a level, the player must either find an exit, complete a goal or defeat a boss character. Flik's primary form of offense against enemy characters is throwing berries. By default, Flik throws red-colored berries, which are the weakest form of berry and cannot harm certain enemies. Stronger berries can either be found within a level or received from planting purple-colored seeds. Collecting purple seed tokens increases the range of berries a seed can produce. Aside from increased power, some berries travel faster and can home in on enemies. The strongest form of berry is gold-colored and is capable of permanently eliminating enemies and preventing them from respawning.

Several seeds are scattered throughout the levels. Flik can hoist most seeds over his head and carry them to other areas, although some seeds are embedded into the ground and cannot be moved. Jumping on top of a seed creates a plant that aids Flik in some fashion. By default, all seeds are colored brown and bear plants that help Flik traverse high terrain. The color of the seeds and the type of plant they bear can be changed if Flik collects differently-colored seed tokens within a level. Some plants can restore Flik's health, provide a shield from enemy attacks, propel him through the air, or damage enemies by firing berries. Plants can be uprooted and discarded, which results in a fresh seed appearing in its place.

Flik's health is displayed as a leaf on the top-right corner of the screen, and the player is given six lives at the beginning of the game. When Flik's health is full, the leaf appears whole, but if he is harmed by an enemy or hazard, a bite is taken out of the leaf. Health can be restored by collecting leaves marked with a red cross, which are released from defeated enemies and blue seed plants. Collecting 50 pieces of grain within a level will restore Flik's health completely. If the leaf is completely eaten away, a life is lost. An extra life can be received if the letters F, L, I and K are collected within a level. If all of Flik's lives are lost, it is game over.

Floating telescopes grant a rotating view of either hidden items in a level or the level's exit and the surrounding details. Flik's grain harvester is present in certain levels, and can be used to attract distant grain and permanently kill most enemies while it is worn.

After completing levels in the PlayStation and Windows versions, the player will unlock clips from the film.

== Development and release ==
The game was announced in October 1997. Developer Traveller's Tales' website suggests a Sega Saturn version was once in development. A version for the Game.com was also announced but never released.

The PlayStation version was digitally re-released for the PlayStation 3 and PlayStation Portable on July 27, 2010. The PlayStation and Game Boy Color versions of the game were re-released in 2026 as part of the Toy Story: Retro Roundup! compilation.

== Reception ==
Reception

Aggregate score
| Aggregator | Score |
|---|---|
| GameRankings | (PS) 55.73% (N64) 54.40% (GBC) 36.63% |

Review scores
| Publication | Score |
|---|---|
| AllGame | 2.5/5 |
| Computer and Video Games | (PS) 5/10 |
| Electronic Gaming Monthly | (PS) 4/10, 4.5/10, 6/10, 4/10 (N64) 4/10, 4/10, 5.5/10, 4/10 |
| Game Informer | (PS) 7.5/10 (GBC) 5.75/10 (N64) 5.25/10 |
| GamePro | (PS) 16/20 |
| GameRevolution | (PS) C |
| GameSpot | (N64) 6.1/10 (PS) 2.7/10 |
| IGN | (N64) 6.8/10 (PS) 4/10 (GBC) 3/10 |
| Next Generation | (N64) 1/5 |
| Nintendo Power | (N64) 6.2/10 (GBC) 4.9/10 |
| Official U.S. PlayStation Magazine | (PS) 2/5 |

The console versions of A Bug's Life was met with "mixed or average" reviews while the Game Boy Color version was met with "generally unfavorable" reviews. Aggregating review website GameRankings gave the Nintendo 64 version 54.40%, the PlayStation version 55.73% and the Game Boy Color version 36.63%. GameSpot gave the PlayStation version 2.7 out of 10, concluding that it was "obvious that Disney was more interested in producing a $40 advertisement for its movie than in developing a playable game". However, the same site later gave the Nintendo 64 version a score of 6.1 out of 10, stating that "children looking to relive the fun of the movie should be pleased with the simplicity of the game". IGN gave the Nintendo 64 version 6.8 out of 10, praising the presentation and sound by stating that it had an "upbeat, cheery look and feel very much like the movie of the same name" with "cheery, happy tunes and strong sound effects" but criticised the gameplay by saying the controls were sluggish with "stuttering framerate" and "tired gameplay mechanics" while they gave the PlayStation version 4 out of 10, criticizing the gameplay as slow and awkward but praising the presentation as cinematic. The same site later gave the Game Boy Color version a score of three out of ten, calling it "short and repetitive" and "below average".

Daniel Erickson reviewed the Nintendo 64 version of the game for Next Generation, rating it one star out of five, and stated that "any way you slice it, this stinks".

In its first full month of release, the PlayStation version of A Bug's Life was the thirteenth best-selling home console video game in the United States. By May 1999, it sold 1 million units and generated $50 million in revenue.

=== Awards ===
The game won the "PC Children's Entertainment Title of the Year" award at the 2nd Annual Interactive Achievement Awards, competing against six other nominees.
