= Lego The Lord of the Rings (video game) =

2012 action-adventure game

- Developers: Traveller's Tales; TT Fusion (handheld/mobile)
- Publishers: Warner Bros. Interactive Entertainment; Feral Interactive (OS X)
- Directors: Jon Burton; James McLoughlin
- Designers: Toby Everett; Dewi Roberts; Andrew Holt
- Programmer: Steve Harding
- Artist: Leon Warren
- Composer: Rob Westwood
- Platforms: Android; iOS; Microsoft Windows; Nintendo 3DS; Nintendo DS; OS X; PlayStation 3; PlayStation Vita; Wii; Xbox 360
- Release: PlayStation Vita, Nintendo 3DS, Nintendo DS: NA: 30 October 2012; EU: 23 November 2012; PlayStation 3, Xbox 360, Microsoft Windows, Wii: NA: 13 November 2012; EU: 23 November 2012; OS X: WW: 22 February 2013; Android and iOS: WW: 7 November 2013
- Genre: Action-adventure
- Modes: Single-player, multiplayer

Lego The Lord of the Rings is a 2012 Lego-themed action-adventure video game developed by Traveller's Tales released for the Nintendo 3DS, Nintendo DS, PlayStation Vita, Microsoft Windows, PlayStation 3, Xbox 360, and Wii (the final Lego game released for the latter console). An OS X version of the game, published by Feral Interactive, was released on 21 February 2013.

Based on The Lord of the Rings film trilogy, the game follows the original but spoofed storylines of The Fellowship of the Ring, The Two Towers, and The Return of the King, taking players through the epic story events, "re-imagined with the humour and endless variety of Lego play". The game utilises music and voice acting taken from all three films of the film trilogy. Developer Traveller's Tales has stated they toned down the slapstick humour found in other Lego-licensed titles. The game follows the events in the films; however, like the Lego Star Wars series, some scenes from the films have been altered to become more family friendly or provide comic relief to the player.

== Gameplay ==
Lego The Lord of the Rings features gameplay similar to previous Lego video games, and introduces new features based on The Lord of the Rings franchise. Throughout the game, players can collect and use numerous magical items, including the Light of Eärendil, Elven rope and a wide variety of swords, bows and other such weaponry and armour from the films. Certain characters have new abilities, such as lighting up dark places (Frodo, Gandalf, Radagast and Saruman) and being thrown at objects and to locations (Gimli and Gloin). Each character has their own inventory, which usually consists of weapons and quest items. Some characters have items with abilities that are either character-exclusive or available only to a small number of characters. There is also an inventory shared by all characters, which includes all Mithril items as well as collectible items located throughout the open world and all the missions, all of which feature a large variety of weaponry and abilities.

The game has a total of 18 levels (6 for each film, plus a bonus level upon completion), as well as a hidden ending, which is unlocked after 100% of the game is complete. Combat involves the player attacking enemies either through basic melee combos or firing projectiles, either through aiming or pressing the shoot button. However, if the player and the enemy are both using swords, they may enter a brief sword fighting sequence involving the player pressing the fight button. Throughout the game, some parts of both the story and the open world can only be traversed or completed by using special items or abilities. These abilities include fishing, shooting, collecting water, explosive, invisibility, breaking Mordor bricks, light, and jumping high.

=== Free roam ===
In the open world mode of the game, the player controls two changeable characters and is allowed to freely explore the game world, which spans the entire world of Middle-Earth minus Mirkwood and the lands south of Mordor. There are more than 80 playable characters, including Frodo Baggins, Gandalf, Legolas, and many others to discover and unlock including Tom Bombadil, a character who appears in the books but not in the film trilogy. While players primarily travel on foot, they have the option of using Fast Travel through the Map, which transports the player to any location they have previously been to and allows the player to change the time of day. Horses may also be ridden at specific locations throughout the world.

Throughout the map, there are several notable locations, including the Custom Character creator at Bag End in the Shire, where players can create custom characters, and the Blacksmith in Bree, who creates items using the player's Mithril Bricks and Blueprints. While in free roam, the player can unlock and buy characters by finding them throughout Middle-Earth, defeating them in battle, and then buying them for a varying number of Studs. Some characters can only be unlocked after the player completes puzzles to find their character tokens, after which they can be bought through the character selection screen. There are also many different side quests scattered through Middle-Earth, which usually consist of having the player find a specific item. Upon finding the item, the player is usually rewarded with Extras, which grant the player special boosts. Also scattered throughout Middle-Earth are Blueprints, Mithril Bricks, and other collectibles.

== Plot ==
The game follows the storylines from The Lord of the Rings movie trilogy: The Fellowship of the Ring, The Two Towers, and The Return of the King. However, the game's developers modified the storylines to fit the events into a number of game chapters per film. Central events and sequences were recreated from the films, such as the Mines of Moria scenes. Each different character has at least one special ability. The characters can also add new items and weapons to their inventory as the story advances, thus adding role-playing elements to the traditional Lego gameplay.

== Development ==
The game was not released for Wii U because Traveller's Tales, Lego, and Nintendo were busy completing Lego City Undercover, which was already behind schedule. The Wii version for Europe was delayed until 30 November. The game has also been released for iOS. It was released on 20 October 2013. The gameplay is mostly the same, with minor limitations.

=== Audio ===
Lego The Lord of the Rings is the second Lego game to features full voice acting, following Lego Batman 2: DC Super Heroes. However, the dialogue is taken directly from the films. Additional voices were provided by Eric Artell, Steven Blum, Cam Clarke, Chris Edgerly, Kieren Elliott, Gideon Emery, Crispin Freeman, Bob Joles, Tom Kane, Jennifer Taylor Lawrence, Yuri Lowenthal, Jim Meskimen, Nolan North, Liam O'Brien, Jon Olson, Jim Piddock, Eliza Schneider, Keith Szarabajka, Fred Tatasciore, Anna Vocino and Hynden Walch.

== Marketing and release ==
Lego The Lord of the Rings complements the Lego The Lord of the Rings toy collection. Pre-orders of the game came with an Elrond minifigure with a code to enter on the game's homepage for a wallpaper and designer video. Lego Batman 2: DC Super Heroes includes a trailer for the game. A demo was released for Microsoft Windows, Nintendo 3DS and Xbox 360. Upon release, the Xbox 360 version had been potentially recalled for being shipped with demo discs rather than the full retail copy.

The game was the last Lego video game released on the Wii, as well as the first Middle-Earth video game to be available on a Nintendo, Sony and Microsoft console since The Lord of the Rings: The Third Age.

On 1 January 2019, all digital sales of the game were halted. This was confirmed a few days later by publisher Warner Bros. Interactive. The game was later re-added to Steam on 27 April 2020, and it was added to Xbox backwards compatibility on the Xbox One and Series X and S consoles on 15 November 2021.

=== Downloadable content ===
Lego Lord of the Rings has four packs of downloadable content (DLC), which were also available with pre-ordering the game. The first one includes Sméagol (before he was corrupted as Gollum), Sauron in his Second Age "fair" form (Annatar), and three other characters, and the second one includes characters such as a Mini-Balrog and a Corsair of Umbar. The third one includes tools, such as the Three Elven rings, and a fourth includes a special Faramir and a Barrow-wight. There is no way to buy the DLC for the PC version of the game.

== Reception ==
Reception

Aggregate score
| Aggregator | Score |
|---|---|
| Metacritic | 3DS: 61/100; Vita: 54/100; PC: 80/100; PS3: 82/100; X360: 80/100 iOS: 78/100 |

Review scores
| Publication | Score |
|---|---|
| Edge | 6/10 |
| Eurogamer | 9/10 |
| G4 | 4/5 |
| GameSpot | 8.5/10 |
| GamesRadar+ | 4/5 |
| IGN | 6.8/10; Vita: 3.8/10 |
| TouchArcade | 3.5/5 |
| VideoGamer.com | 8/10 |
| SKOAR! | 70/100 |

Lego The Lord of the Rings has received generally positive reviews from critics, mostly praising the story, humour and visuals based on Peter Jackson's Lord of the Rings trilogy. GameRankings gave it a score of 82% based on 12 reviews. However, the PS Vita version was criticised for offering a similar experience to that on the 3DS, instead of the fuller, open world experience, like that on the PC - which some felt the PS Vita was capable of providing.
