= Leander (video game) =

1991 video game

- Developer: Traveller's Tales
- Publisher: Psygnosis
- Designers: Andy Ingram; Jon Burton
- Composer: Tim Wright
- Platforms: Amiga, Atari ST, Sega Mega Drive
- Release: 1991: Amiga, Atari ST; 1992: Mega Drive
- Genre: Platform
- Mode: Single-player

Leander is a video game for the Amiga developed by Traveller's Tales and published by Psygnosis in 1991. It was the first game developed by Traveller's Tales. The game was developed on the Amiga, then converted to the Atari ST by Philipp Wyatt for W.J.S Design. A year later it was published for the Sega Mega Drive as Galahad by Electronic Arts.

== Plot ==
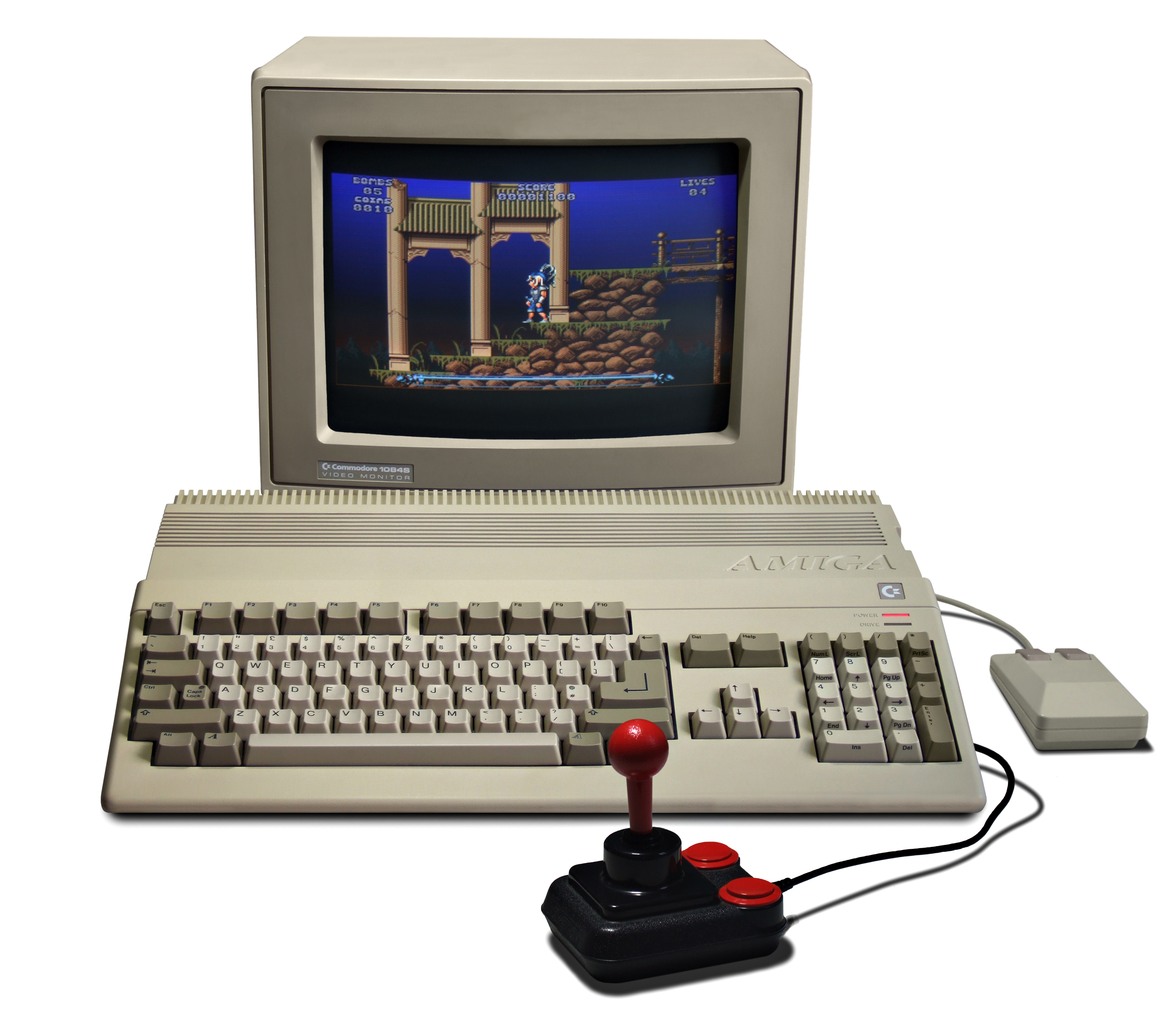
Leander on the Amiga 500

The player assumes the role of the legendary knight Leander (changed in the Mega Drive port to Galahad) and rescue the princess Lucanna from the wizard Thanatos (Miragorn in the Mega Drive port, who kidnapped Lucanna in an attempt to get King Arthur to come to him).

== Gameplay ==
Leander collects coins through three sprawling worlds, each composed of seven levels, with which he can purchase armour, potions and new swords in a shop which appears infrequently during the game. The ultimate aim of each level is to find a certain object named at the start of a level (with instructions where to find it). When Leander finds it, he must find a portal which will lead him on to the next level. If he does not find the object, he cannot enter the portal.

Enemies encountered during the game range from dragons and elves to snakes and giant otters. At the end of each world, Leander faces a gargantuan boss, whom he must defeat to enter the next world.

== Reception ==
Reception

Review scores
Publication	Score
AllGame	3.5/5 (Mega Drive)
Mega Action	87% (Mega Drive)
The One	93% (Amiga)

The One gave the Amiga version of Leander an overall score of 93%, calling it "classy" and "graphically amazing", making note of "additional touches" such as detailed waves, waterfalls and rain. The One praises Leander's colourful graphics, 'smooth' scrolling, and gameplay, stating that "Leander has captured the console concept perfectly ... Control over Leander quickly becomes second nature, but is sophisticated enough to allow high jumping and ladder climbing."

== Anti-piracy ==
An anti-piracy measure was tested during development which required punching a hole into the disk with a laser. If implemented, the game would freeze and refuse to load without the punch being present.

Should the physical check be removed, the game will load fine then, but with one catch. The player will be unable to get past level four as one of the platforms needed to progress has its collision removed. Further levels have no terrain whatsoever, resulting in the player falling through the platforms. Not only this, but the damage the player deals is halved.

The copy protection method was ultimately unused.
