= Puggsy =

1993 video game

- Developer: Traveller's Tales
- Publisher: Psygnosis
- Designer: Jon Burton
- Artist: Andy Ingram
- Composers: Matt Furniss (Genesis and Sega CD versions); Tim Wright (Amiga version)
- Platforms: Mega Drive; Mega-CD; Amiga
- Release: EU: November 19, 1993; NA: January 6, 1994
- Genre: Puzzle-platform
- Mode: Single player

Puggsy is a 1993 puzzle-platform game developed by Traveller's Tales and published by Psygnosis. It was released for the Mega Drive and Mega-CD consoles, as well as the Amiga home computer, on October 1993 in Europe and in North America on January 6, 1994. The game was to be released for the Super Nintendo Entertainment System, but the version was cancelled. The game revolves around the titular character Puggsy, an orange space hopper–like alien who landed his spaceship on The Planet, intending to return home until his spaceship was stolen by the raccoon natives of the planet.

== Gameplay ==
Wabbits World level, a reference to Wiz 'n' Liz

The gameplay is mostly a cross between a normal platform game, with the usual style of platformer enemies and a variety of means to kill them, and a puzzle game of sorts where Puggsy is often required to find objects, and either carry them to a specific location or somehow use them in order to complete levels. There are also a variety of objects that have power-up effects, such as allowing Puggsy to be hit once or twice without dying, speeding him up or making him temporarily invincible, and objects that while not necessary, can be temporarily helpful, such as a variety of guns (most of which have limited ammunition which can often not be refilled).

Objects react on a clever physics-based system, which was an innovative feature at the time. The system allows objects to be thrown, or to topple if stacked without care. Each object also has a different weight. Another effect of this is that Puggsy can carry stacks of objects along a flat surface, but a slope will often cause all items except the bottom one (held by Puggsy) to topple and scatter. Also, any objects carried out of the level exits give different score values, or in the case of the heart object, an extra life. Other objects are extremely varied, including shells, weights, matches, keys, balloons, cups, barrels, clue-giving chests, knives, and candles.

The game features 57 levels in a variety of settings (16 of those levels being secret) and 6 boss characters (9 boss characters in the Mega-CD version), although not all levels and bosses have to be finished to complete the game, and 5 training levels, accessed from the "Junior" option on the title screen. Also, while the player can just play through the game normally and reach the normal ending, a few secret "endings" (cinematic sequences that can only be terminated by resetting the console, or that reset the game themselves) are available by achieving certain goals, such as leaving one secret level with blocks that spelt out the word "HEROS", playing all 51 normal levels (6 of the secret levels are only accessible via a special password, and are not counted towards the normal level total), or playing through the 6 previously mentioned special secret levels. The password to obtain these levels had to be obtained by evaluating three math expressions that appeared during the credits, where they are called "a silly maths equation". In the "HEROS" ending, the player is congratulated for finding the ending, and then asked, "...but are you good at maths?".

== Development ==
The Puggsy character originally appeared in an Amiga demo named Puggs in Space, which was created and designed by Dionysus—a demogroup formed by Lee Carus, Alan McCarthy and Tim Wright. The management of Psygnosis was impressed by the demo, and asked Dionysus to develop a game based around Puggsy. However, the contract with Psygnosis to produce a game was short-lived; Wright said the company "didn't really 'get' where we were going with the game". The demogroup was pulled out of the game's development, which was then shifted to Traveller's Tales. Psygnosis asked Traveller's Tales if they could develop a game using the character from the demo. Puggsy was designed and programmed by Jon Burton, while Andy Ingram handled the graphic design and artwork for the game. While the character design for Puggsy was retained from the demo, the developers changed his colour from red to orange to prevent the consoles from colour bleeding. Wright recalled that Dionysus's version was going to be similar to LittleBigPlanet, while Traveller's Tales' version was created as a standard platformer.

The object physics in Puggsy was inspired by Super Mario World, a game Burton had enjoyed. Burton decided to create a Super Mario World-type game, but with puzzles being based on physical objects with different properties such as buoyancy, weight, friction and so on. As Puggsy was deemed too complicated for novice players, the training levels were added late in development in response to the publisher's input. Burton noted that the training levels would give the impression of a basic platformer. The music was written by Matt Furniss, an employee of Krisalis Software. Wright created cover versions of Furniss' tunes for the Amiga version and added a Puggsy demo theme into a tail end of one of the pieces. Wright found Furniss' music "really well written and fun to convert to the Amiga, so there were no bad bones." A promised sequel titled as Puggsy II, was teased at the game's ending, but it never materialised. The SNES version was almost completed, but it was cancelled, with developers hoping to find the SNES version and release it in public domain. The ROM to the SNES version was posted online in May 2022 by The Cutting Room Floor.

As the Mega Drive cartridge copiers were defaulted to simulate a battery-backed SRAM for storing save data, Puggsy uses an SRAM as a means of an anti-piracy feature. Since the game employs a password system, genuine cartridges do not contain an internal SRAM. The game performs an SRAM check after its fifth level, and if an SRAM is found, it displays a warning message telling the player to stop playing a "silly copy" of Puggsy.

== Reception ==
Reception

Review scores
Publication	Score
Mean Machines Sega	90% (Mega Drive)
The One Amiga 66	90% (Amiga)
CU Amiga	90% (Amiga)
Amiga Dream 5	89% (Amiga)

MegaTech gave the game 90% and a Hyper Game Award, saying that it was "excellently designed and thought-out", but listed the control system as the major weak point. Reviewing the Mega-CD version, GamePro praised the controls, the graphics, the sound effects, the strong challenge, and the attention to detail, concluding that "Though veteran gamers will quickly tire of Puggsy, younger players will enjoy his island antics."
