= Toy Story 3 (video game) =

2010 video game

- North American cover art featuring Woody (left) and Buzz (right)
- Developer: Avalanche Software (Note: PlayStation Portable and PlayStation 2 versions by Asobo Studio, Nintendo DS version by n-Space, Mac OS X by TransGaming, iOS by Disney Mobile Studios, and Complete Edition by Digital Eclipse)
- Publisher: Disney Interactive Studios (Note: Disney Mobile Studios published the iOS version. Atari published Complete Edition.)
- Composer: Chuck E. Myers (Note: Alexander Röder, Benny Oschmann, and Jochen Flach composed the score for the PlayStation Portable and PlayStation 2 versions, with Mark Watters composing the score for the Nintendo DS version.)
- Series: Toy Story
- Platforms: iOS; Mac OS X; Nintendo DS; PlayStation 3; PlayStation Portable; Wii; Windows; Xbox 360; PlayStation 2; Complete Edition; Nintendo Switch; Nintendo Switch 2; PlayStation 4; PlayStation 5; Windows; Xbox One; Xbox Series X/S
- Release: Mac OS X, Nintendo DS, PlayStation 3, PlayStation Portable, Wii, Windows, Xbox 360: NA: June 15, 2010; UK: July 16, 2010; iOS: WW: June 15, 2010; PlayStation 2: NA: October 31, 2010; Complete Edition: WW: October 15, 2026
- Genres: Platform, sandbox
- Modes: Single-player, multiplayer

Toy Story 3 (also known as Toy Story 3: The Video Game) is a 2010 platform game developed by Avalanche Software and published by Disney Interactive Studios. The game is based on the 2010 film of the same name. It was released for PlayStation 3, Xbox 360, Wii, and Microsoft Windows. The game was ported to Mac OS X by TransGaming. A Nintendo DS version was developed by n-Space, while Disney Mobile Studios developed and published an iOS game based on the film. Another version was developed by Asobo Studio and released for PlayStation 2 and PlayStation Portable.

By February 2008, Disney had rejected THQ's pitch to develop the film's video game adaptation, choosing instead to have it developed by Disney's Avalanche Software. A 10-person team from Pixar aided Avalanche in developing the game. Most of the voice cast from the film reprised their characters for the game. Toy Story 3 includes a story mode that loosely recreates the film's events, and the Toy Box mode, consisting of a western town that can be freely roamed and customized by the player. The game was well received by critics, particularly for its Toy Box mode, which would later be expanded upon to create the Disney Infinity series. The game was a top-seller in the UK.

An enhanced port, Toy Story 3: Complete Edition, was released on Nintendo Switch, Nintendo Switch 2, PlayStation 4, PlayStation 5, Windows, Xbox One, and Xbox Series X/S in October 2026.

== Gameplay ==
Toy Story 3 is a platform video game. The game includes a story mode, which loosely recreates the events of the film; and the Toy Box mode, set within the universe of the fictional Woody's Roundup television series, which is featured in the second film, Toy Story 2.

The Xbox 360 and PlayStation 3 (PS3) versions include a multiplayer feature in both modes. Woody, Buzz, and Jessie are playable characters throughout the game. They each have their own abilities that are needed to progress through the story mode, although they play the same when in Toy Box mode. The PS2 and PSP versions also allow the player to control the Aliens and Andy's soldier toys during certain levels. The PS3 and Xbox 360 versions have eight story mode levels, while the PS2 and PSP version includes 13 levels in story mode. In the latter versions, after the player has completed a level in Story Mode, they can go back and replay it to try the two Challenge modes, which are Cube Destruction and Time Attack, that allow the player to win coins and unlock trophies. The three mini-games are Woody's Roundup (five levels), Buzz Adventures (five levels) and Aliens Escapades (two levels), based on the events of Toy Story 2. In the PSP version, the final two levels of both Woody's Roundup and Buzz Adventures, along with the two levels of Aliens Escapes, have to be purchased via the PlayStation Store as downloadable content.

Toy Box mode takes place in a western town that can be freely roamed and customized by the player. Toy Box mode features missions from Mayor Hamm, townsfolk, and other toys. Compared to the Xbox 360 and PS3 versions, the Wii, Windows and Mac OS X versions have fewer Toy Box options for gameplay and town customization, and they lack a multiplayer option. The PS2 and PSP versions exclude the Toy Box mode entirely, and also lack multiplayer.

Emperor Zurg driving in his vehicle

The PlayStation 3 version of the game features exclusive content such as the ability to play as Emperor Zurg in Toy Box mode, in addition to Buzz, Woody and Jessie. Players can drive around in Zurg's custom vehicle as well as blast at enemies using his trigun. Zurg has his own set of missions, and his primary goal is to eliminate Buzz. In addition, the game also features compatibility with the PlayStation Move motion controller, and there are also downloadable mini-games designed specifically for the Move that could be downloaded for free from the PlayStation Store. The PlayStation 3 content is included in the Complete Edition re-release.

An iOS mobile application for iPhone and iPod Touch includes two built-in games: the free Woody's Wild Ride, in which the player controls Woody while riding his horse Bullseye across 10 levels; and the premium Toy Story Mania, in which includes a set of carnival-style minigames, custom stages, levels, and virtual prizes. The application also allows the player to use their iPhone or iPod Touch as a controller for the Macintosh version.

The Nintendo DS version supports a Nintendo DSi exclusive feature, where the player can use the audio modulator to alter their recorded voices.

== Plot ==
Toy Story 3 is based on the film. Woody, Buzz Lightyear, Jessie, and others are among toys that previously belonged to a boy named Andy. Now 17 years old, Andy has donated his toys to a girl named Bonnie before leaving for college. Three of Andy's toys – Hamm, Rex and Slinky – tell Bonnie's original toys about an adventure they had before being donated to Bonnie. Andy's toys explain that they were donated to the Sunnyside Daycare center, run by a stuffed bear named Lotso. The toys later learn that Sunnyside is a toy prison run by Lotso, a disgruntled ruler of the daycare toys. Andy's toys escape through a trash chute and wind up in a garbage truck, which takes them to a landfill, where they are about to be destroyed by a trash shredder. In the PlayStation 2 (PS2), PlayStation Portable (PSP), and Nintendo DS versions, the toys are saved by Andy's Alien toys (like in the film). In the other versions, Woody, Buzz, and Jessie save the other toys. In addition, the PS2 and PSP versions feature only Rex telling the story, through drawings that he has created.

== Development ==
By February 2008, Disney and Pixar had rejected THQ's pitch to develop the video game adaptation of Toy Story 3, choosing instead to have it developed by Disney's Avalanche Software. THQ had been a long-time developer of Disney games. Avalanche Software presented two ideas to Pixar: a traditional story mode that retells the film's story, and the free-roaming Toy Box mode. Pixar liked the ideas and suggested they both be developed.

Jonathan Warner, a senior producer on the game for Avalanche, said: "We knew we couldn't just do a 'see the movie, play the game' kind of treatment. This movie is so powerful. It's about the characters and the situations they find themselves in. We had to honour that". Among Avalanche's primary challenges was creating a game that would appeal to various age groups. The game was later tested by more than 60 groups of children aged 6 to 14, and the developers found that it appealed across the demographic.

Pixar was heavily involved in the game's development, with a 10-person team from the company aiding Avalanche. The Pixar team reviewed game sequences every other week. Avalanche art director Jeff Bunker said: "Something could be off by a pixel and Pixar would call us out. I didn't find that annoying, I found it exhilarating. The message was, 'We're going for perfection here'". Toy Story co-creator John Lasseter and Toy Story 3 director Lee Unkrich were involved in the game's development as well, and provided input on how to make the Toy Box mode feel more like a Toy Story video game. Avalanche developed the Toy Box mode as the game's centerpiece, with the story mode added primarily as a companion.

Describing the Toy Box mode, Warner said the development team "wanted to take that experience where kids combine different sets of toys from their toy box but it totally makes sense to them, it all flows out of their imagination". Warner further explained that the Toy Box mode begins in a typical western town setting "but soon you're able to start bringing in toys that make no sense to the Western setting and context, like a haunted house toy - and these change the way the town looks, the sort of enemies and toys it brings to the environment, pushing things in a completely different direction". The Toy Box mode went through approximately 10 different versions before Avalanche finalized it. The original version of Toy Box mode would involve bandits invading the player's town, and Warner said the player would then have to "keep performing tasks to make sure everything was still going. We thought it would be a fun and interesting idea, but it turned out to be more like hard work!"

Avalanche wanted the game to have a cinematic quality like the films. The development team chose to make the characters look identical to their film counterparts, and worked closely with Pixar to achieve this goal. Renders and models of the characters were passed to the development team from the film's animators, and the game's characters were hand-drawn rather than using the traditional method of motion capture that is typically utilized in games. Most of the film's voice cast reprised their roles for the game, including Joan Cusack (Jessie), John Ratzenberger (Hamm), Wallace Shawn (Rex), Blake Clark (Slinky Dog), and R. Lee Ermey (Sarge). In the home console versions, Jeff Garlin and Kristen Schaal also reprised their roles from the film as Buttercup and Trixie. Tom Hanks, who voiced Woody in the films, was unavailable to voice him for the game because of a busy schedule, so his brother Jim Hanks provided Woody's voice in the game.

Toy Story 3: The Video Game was announced on February 16, 2010, at the American International Toy Fair, along with the Toy Story 3 mobile application. In April, Disney Interactive Studios announced the exclusive content for the PlayStation 3 version, including the ability to play as Emperor Zurg or unlock additional mini-games designed specifically for PlayStation Move motion controller. The PlayStation 2 and PlayStation Portable versions were developed by Asobo Studio, while the iOS game was developed by Disney Mobile Studios. A version for Mac OS X was developed by TransGaming via Cider.

== Release ==
Toy Story 3: The Video Game was published by Disney, and was the first Pixar game in years to not be published by THQ. In the United States, Toy Story 3: The Video Game was released on June 15, 2010, three days prior to the film's theatrical release. It was released for computer, PS3, PSP, Nintendo DS, Wii, and Xbox 360. The game was released for the same platforms in the U.K. on July 16. The iOS application was released in the U.S. on June 15, with Disney Mobile Studios as the publisher.

The PS2 version was initially released in the U.S. on October 31, as part of a system bundle celebrating the tenth anniversary of the console's North American launch. The PS2 version was also released in the U.S. as a standalone copy on November 2, coinciding with the film's home video release.

In September 2016, the Xbox 360 version became backwards compatible with the Xbox One. In September 2022, the PlayStation Portable version was added to PlayStation Plus.

In June 2026, two weeks before the release of the film Toy Story 5 and before the 16th anniversary of the film, Digital Eclipse and Atari announced Toy Story 3: Complete Edition, a re-release of the game for modern platforms. It includes the PlayStation 3 exclusive content and support for higher resolution visuals and framerate. The Complete Edition was released on October 15, 2026 for Nintendo Switch, Nintendo Switch 2, PlayStation 4, PlayStation 5, Windows, Xbox One, and Xbox Series X/S. The game is available digitally as a standalone purchase or physically in a two-pack with the Toy Story: Retro Roundup! compilation.

== Reception ==
Reception

Aggregate score
Aggregator	Score					
Aggregator	iOS	Macintosh	PC	PS3	Wii	Xbox 360
Metacritic	N/A	N/A	73/100	78/100	76/100	76/100

Review scores
Publication	Score					
Publication	iOS	Macintosh	PC	PS3	Wii	Xbox 360
1Up.com	N/A	N/A	N/A	A−	N/A	A−
Destructoid	N/A	N/A	N/A	N/A	N/A	8/10
Edge	N/A	N/A	N/A	N/A	N/A	6/10
Eurogamer	N/A	N/A	N/A	8/10	N/A	N/A
Game Informer	N/A	N/A	N/A	N/A	6/10	8/10
GameRevolution	N/A	N/A	N/A	B+	N/A	B+
GameSpot	N/A	N/A	N/A	7/10	N/A	7/10
GameTrailers	N/A	N/A	N/A	N/A	N/A	6.8/10
GameZone	N/A	N/A	N/A	N/A	N/A	5/10
IGN	N/A	N/A	7.5/10	8/10	7.5/10	8/10
Nintendo Power	N/A	N/A	N/A	N/A	7.5/10	N/A
Official Nintendo Magazine	N/A	N/A	N/A	N/A	80%	N/A
Official Xbox Magazine (US)	N/A	N/A	N/A	N/A	N/A	7/10
PALGN	N/A	N/A	N/A	7/10	N/A	N/A
PC Gamer (US)	N/A	N/A	76%	N/A	N/A	N/A
PlayStation: The Official Magazine	N/A	N/A	N/A	3.5/5	N/A	N/A
The A.V. Club	N/A	N/A	N/A	N/A	N/A	B+
The Daily Telegraph	N/A	N/A	N/A	N/A	N/A	8/10
Inside Mac Games	N/A	5.75/10	N/A	N/A	N/A	N/A
Macworld	1/5	4/5	N/A	N/A	N/A	N/A
Pocket Gamer	2.5/5	N/A	N/A	N/A	N/A	N/A
Slide to Play	2/4	N/A	N/A	N/A	N/A	N/A

Reception

Aggregate score
Aggregator	Score
OpenCritic	71% recommend (Note: Based on 24 reviews.)

According to Metacritic, the home console versions of Toy Story 3 received generally positive reviews, while the computer version received "mixed or average reviews". Critics praised the Toy Box mode and generally considered it superior to the main story mode, although Louis Bedigian of GameZone considered the Toy Box mode to be "overhyped". Dan Whitehead of Eurogamer stated that the story mode "feels obligatory and rushed". Several reviewers considered Toy Story 3 an improvement over previous Pixar-based games. Some criticized the camera and controls, and the voice acting, including the lack of Tim Allen (as Buzz Lightyear) and Tom Hanks. However, Anthony Gallegos of IGN considered the voice acting to be "generally superb".

Tom Hoggins of The Daily Telegraph reviewed the Xbox 360 version and called it "a world with a sense of humour and fun that will appeal to children and adults alike. A bit like a Pixar film, then. How about that?" Chad Concelmo of Destructoid praised the graphics of the Xbox 360 version but wished the game included more playable characters, such as Slinky Dog or Mr. Potato Head. Meghan Watt of Official Xbox Magazine criticized the platform gameplay and stated that the diverse and random levels leave the player feeling "bored and confused, wondering what the heck you just played". Jeff Cork of Game Informer stated that the characters were faithfully animated like their film counterparts. Tom McShea of GameSpot praised the game's variety and colorful graphics.

Official Nintendo Magazine, reviewing the Wii version, wrote that it was one of its kind, and praised its varied levels during the story mode. Nintendo Power called the Wii version "surprisingly fun", while Cork criticized its "visual downgrade" (which "isn't a big deal") and "neutered Toy Box" (vs. PS3 and Xbox 360 versions) where in this version "only one person can play in this mode, and nearly all of the deeper town customization has been stripped away. What's left is a linear slog through a series of similar missions".

Gallegos criticized the computer version's decreased Toy Box options and believed that the Xbox 360 and PS3 versions had superior graphics. Daniel Knowles of Inside Mac Games reviewed the Macintosh version and criticized the camera, controls, and stated that the game was "uninspiring, badly put together and frequently dull". Knowles said that the characters were well animated, but that the two game modes "feel slightly tacked on". He also believed that the concept of the Toy Box mode was not pushed far enough. Marco Tabini of Macworld praised the graphics and the ability to play the game using an iPhone or iPod as a controller.

Within a month of its release, the free iOS version had been downloaded 1.7 million times. Lex Friedman of Macworld called the iOS game "painfully un-fun" and stated that it played "mostly like a barely-interactive advertisement". Keith Andrew of Pocket Gamer considered the game too easy and uninspired. Tim Rattray of Slide to Play called it short but "quite fun", although he considered the graphics "sub-par and boring".

=== Sales ===
Toy Story 3: The Video Game was a top-seller in the United Kingdom, retaining its number one spot on the UK full-price software charts for three weeks, whilst its big-screen counterpart also held onto the box office top spot. The game remained a top-10 seller in the UK as of September 2010. The Nintendo DS version sold 164,000 copies in the U.S. during June 2010; it and the Wii version were among the top 20 best-selling U.S. games that month.
