= F1 Grand Prix (2005 video game) =

2005 racing video game

- Developer(s): Traveller's Tales
- Publisher(s): Sony Computer Entertainment
- Series: Formula One
- Platform(s): PlayStation Portable
- Release: PAL: 1 September 2005; JP: 22 September 2005
- Genre(s): Racing
- Mode(s): Single-player, multiplayer

F1 Grand Prix (also known as Formula One 2005 Portable in Japan) is a 2005 racing video game developed by Traveller's Tales and published by Sony Computer Entertainment for the PlayStation Portable.

== Gameplay ==
- Quick Race is where the player can set up a random race with random settings from the game.
- Events is where the player can choose from Time Attack, Single Grand Prix (which has to be unlocked) or Scenario Mode (a list of scenarios vital for unlocking extras).
- World Championship allows the player to play the full 2005 FIA Formula One World Championship.
- Multiplayer is Wi-Fi gaming with 2 to 8 players.
- TV Mode Race allows the player to watch a single race as if it were on television.

=== Teams and drivers ===
The game featured the initial driver line ups for the 2005 Formula One World Championship; substitute drivers Pedro de la Rosa, Anthony Davidson, Alexander Wurz, Vitantonio Liuzzi, Ricardo Zonta, Antônio Pizzonia and Robert Doornbos, although all driving in FIA Formula One Races during the 2005 Formula One World Championship, were not included in the game.

=== Circuits ===
The game features all the circuits used in the 2005 Formula One World Championship.

=== Unlockables ===
- There are 19 unlockable tracks, which are mirrors of the original tracks.
- There are 5 unlockable Classic Cars.
- There is an invisible car, unlocked after driving off the course in the German Grand Prix.

=== Download packs ===
- The first official download pack for F1 Grand Prix entitled "Stats Pack And Bonus Car" included the full grid line ups from the first 16 Grand Prix of 2005, excluding Brazil, Japan and China. It also allowed the player to unlock the Lotus 25 Classic Car.
- The three missing grids have been created (unofficially) and were available for download from "The PSP Vault".

== Reception ==
Reception

Aggregate score
Aggregator	Score
Metacritic	61/100

Review scores
Publication	Score
Eurogamer	6/10
Famitsu	29/40
GamesMaster	79%
Jeuxvideo.com	14/20
PALGN	5.5/10
PSM3	71%

The game received "mixed" reviews according to the review aggregation website Metacritic. In Japan, Famitsu gave it a score of one eight and three sevens for a total of 29 out of 40.
