= Finding Nemo (video game) =

2003 video game

- Developers: Traveller's Tales (PS2, GC, Xbox); Vicarious Visions (GBA); KnowWonder (PC & Mac)
- Publisher: THQ
- Producer: Ralph Ferneyhough
- Programmer: John Hodskinson
- Artist: James Cunliffe
- Composer: Andy Blythe; Marten Joustra
- Platforms: Game Boy Advance; GameCube; Microsoft Windows; OS X; PlayStation 2; Xbox
- Release: NA: 9 May 2003; AU: 3 September 2003; EU: 26 September 2003; JP: 6 December 2003
- Genre: Action-adventure
- Mode: Single-player

Finding Nemo is a 2003 action-adventure video game based on the film of the same name by Disney and Pixar. The GameCube, PlayStation 2 and Xbox versions were developed by Traveller's Tales, the Game Boy Advance version of the game was developed by Vicarious Visions, and its Microsoft Windows and Mac versions were developed by KnowWonder. All versions were published by THQ.

== Gameplay ==
All versions of the game roughly follow the plot of the film, though different versions of the games generally omit certain parts of the film's story.

The goal is to complete different levels whilst playing as the film's protagonists Nemo, Marlin or Dory. Whilst most levels are played in a left to right side-scrolling manner, the game also continues a number of minigames and other alternate. It includes cutscenes from the movie, and each clip is based on a level, e.g. hopping through a batch of jellyfish. Most levels have optional tasks to complete to obtain Gold Starfishes, which will allow the player to play a bonus level.

The Game Boy Advance version consists of side-scrolling adventure/puzzle stages along with several minigames interspaced across its length. Each level and minigame is based on a specific scene from the film. Collecting star rings found throughout most levels will give the player the chance to play a memory matching game at the end of each level, which upon completion will unlock an image in the game's gallery. The game does not support saving in its Game Boy Advance version, instead opting for a password system to allow players to carry on from their last completed level, and can be also used to unlock all the images in the gallery.

== Development ==
On June 11, 2002, THQ announced that Traveller's Tales would be developing Finding Nemo titles for home consoles, to be released the same day as the animated film. It was to be the first game to be developed under THQ's publishing deal with Disney Interactive and Pixar.

== Reception ==
Reception

Aggregate score
Aggregator	Score	
Aggregator	GBA	PS2
Metacritic		63/100

Review scores
Publication	Score	
Publication	GBA	PS2
Eurogamer		6/10
Famitsu		27/40
Game Informer		6.5/10
GameRevolution		C+
GameSpot		6.2/10
GameSpy	2/5	2/5
GameZone		6.9/10
IGN		7/10
Nintendo Power	3.8/5	
Official U.S. PlayStation Magazine		3/5

Finding Nemo received "mixed or average reviews" on all platforms according to the review aggregation website Metacritic. whilst the GBA, PC, and Mac OS versions did not receive enough reviews to receive a consensus. Famitsu gave it a score of 27 out of 40 for the PS2 version; and 26 out of 40 for the GameCube version.

Reviewing the console version of the game, GameSpot's Tim Tracy gave the game a 6.2 out of 10, whilst noting that it "does a fine job of re-creating the lighthearted story of the film", and "the controls and gameplay are very simple", it frequently veered into the territory of being frustrating, especially when one attempted to complete every objective. Writing for Eurogamer, Kristan Reed echoed complaints of frustrations with the game's puzzles, though she generally praised the graphics, describing them as "an absolute revelation", ultimately giving the game a 6 out of 10.

Reviewing the Game Boy Advance version of the game, Gamespy's Jon Gibson called the game "a thing of beauty.", whilst bemoaning it as "pretty basic in the gameplay department", ultimately giving the game 2 stars out of 5. Nintendo Power was more positive, with its five reviewers giving the game an average score of 3.8 stars out of 5.

=== Sales ===
In the United States, Finding Nemo's Game Boy Advance version sold 1.2 million copies and earned $30 million by August 2006. During the period between January 2000 and August 2006, it was the 10th highest-selling game launched for the Game Boy Advance, Nintendo DS or PlayStation Portable in that country. The PlayStation 2 version received a "Platinum" sales award from the Entertainment and Leisure Software Publishers Association (ELSPA), indicating sales of at least 300,000 copies in the United Kingdom. As of November 2005, the game sold more than 5 million units worldwide. By February 2006, the game sold more than 7 million units.
