= Traveller's Tales =

British video game developer

TT Games Studios Limited
- Formerly: Traveller's Tales (UK) Limited (1989–2018)
- Type: Subsidiary
- Industry: Video games
- Founded: 1989; 37 years ago
- Founders: Jon Burton; Andy Ingram
- Headquarters: Knutsford, England
- Products: Toy Story (1995–2001); Crash Bandicoot (2001–2004); Lego (2005–present)
- Parent: TT Games (2005–present)

TT Games Studios Limited (previously known as Traveller's Tales) is a British video game developer and a subsidiary of TT Games. Traveller's Tales was founded in 1989 by Jon Burton and Andy Ingram. Initially a small company focused on its own games, it grew in profile through developing games with larger companies such as Sega and Disney Interactive Studios. In 2004, development on Lego Star Wars: The Video Game started with Giant Interactive Entertainment, the exclusive rights holder to Lego video games. Traveller's Tales bought the company in 2005, and the two merged to create TT Games, with Traveller's Tales becoming the new company's development arm.

== History ==
=== Founding and work with Disney and Sega (1989–2007) ===
Traveller's Tales started developing games with Psygnosis, which were most notable for creating 3D effects. Their first game was Leander, also known as The Legend of Galahad. With Psygnosis it developed a video game adaption of Bram Stoker's Dracula, as well as other original productions like Puggsy and Rascal. Thanks to an agreement between Psygnosis, Sony Imagesoft and Disney Interactive Studios, Traveller's Tales could produce several games based on Disney's properties, such as the Mickey Mouse game Mickey Mania: The Timeless Adventures of Mickey Mouse and other games based on Pixar films like Toy Story, A Bug's Life, Toy Story 2: Buzz Lightyear to the Rescue and Finding Nemo (the latter two thanks to agreements with Activision and THQ).

Traveller's Tales was best known in the 1990s and early 2000s for its second-party collaboration with Sega to develop games based on the Sonic the Hedgehog franchise, resulting in Sonic 3D Blast and Sonic R, which were produced in close effort with Sega's Sonic Team. Both games were regarded as technical achievements in the Mega Drive (Sonic 3D Blast) and the Sega Saturn (Sonic R), adding to the high-tech development status it already had with games like Puggsy, Mickey Mania and Toy Story. They were also responsible for Crash Bandicoot: The Wrath of Cortex and Crash Twinsanity, under the Vivendi label.

They developed Lego Star Wars: The Video Game as well as its follow-ups. Outside of the Lego games, its work includes entries in the Crash Bandicoot franchise, two The Chronicles of Narnia games, Super Monkey Ball Adventure, and World Rally Championship and F1 Grand Prix for the PlayStation Portable.

=== Warner Bros. acquisition and Lego titles (2007–present) ===
The company was purchased by Warner Bros. Interactive Entertainment at the end of 8 November 2007, but continued to operate independently. Following the release of The Chronicles of Narnia: Prince Caspian (2008), Traveller's Tales would work exclusively on Lego titles – though other TT subsidiaries such as TT Fusion continued to use other intellectual property until the early 2010s. While some of the early Lego titles would be published by LucasArts, from 2011 Warner would also act as the studio's exclusive publisher.

In 2015, Traveller's Tales entered the toys-to-life business with Lego Dimensions, which used a toy pad to enter physical Lego minifigures and Lego models into the game, as well as interact with gameplay. The game included existing Lego themes like DC Comics, The Lego Movie and The Lord of the Rings, as well as new properties such as Portal 2 and Wizard of Oz. The game was discontinued in October 2017.

Traveller's Tales has won two BAFTAs, one for Gameplay with Lego Star Wars II: The Original Trilogy, and one for Children's Videogame of the Year for Lego Batman: The Videogame.

On 11 December 2018, Traveller's Tales was renamed TT Games Studios.

On 20 January 2022, a report published by Polygon detailed the amount of crunch that occurred at the studio during the development of Lego Star Wars: The Skywalker Saga, including dozens inside the company being at odds with management, due to expressing frustration over tight development schedules, the company's crunch culture, and outdated development tools. In addition, the use of NTT (a new in-house engine that was being developed to replace Traveller's Tales' previous engine in attempt to avoid paying royalties for using a third-party engine like Unreal Engine or Unity) was controversial within the company, as many employees had been pushing to instead use Unreal Engine. NTT turned out to be difficult to use, with some animations taking hours more to produce than they would on the old engine. As a result, The Skywalker Saga would end up being the only game developed by Traveller's Tales to use NTT, with the company deciding to use Unreal Engine going forward for its future projects.

== Games developed ==
Year	Title	Publisher(s)	Platforms
1991	Leander	Psygnosis; Electronic Arts (Mega Drive)	Amiga, Atari ST, Mega Drive
1993	Bram Stoker's Dracula	Sony Imagesoft	Mega Drive, Super NES
1993	Puggsy	Psygnosis	Amiga, Mega Drive, Mega-CD
1994	Mickey Mania: The Timeless Adventures of Mickey Mouse	Sony Imagesoft (Mega Drive/Mega-CD/SNES); Sony Computer Entertainment Europe (PlayStation)	Mega Drive, Sega CD, PlayStation, Super NES
1995	Toy Story	Disney Interactive	Mega Drive, Microsoft Windows, Super NES
1996	Sonic 3D Blast	Sega	Mega Drive, Sega Saturn
1997	Sonic R	Sega	Microsoft Windows, Sega Saturn
1998	Rascal	Psygnosis	PlayStation
1998	A Bug's Life	Disney Interactive (Windows); Sony Computer Entertainment (PlayStation); Activision (Nintendo 64)	Microsoft Windows, Nintendo 64, PlayStation
1999	Toy Story 2: Buzz Lightyear to the Rescue	Activision	Dreamcast, Mac OS, Microsoft Windows, Nintendo 64, PlayStation
2000	Muppet RaceMania	Midway Games (US); Sony Computer Entertainment Europe (PAL)	PlayStation
2000	Buzz Lightyear of Star Command	Activision	Dreamcast, Game Boy Color, Microsoft Windows, PlayStation
2001	Toy Story Racer	Activision	PlayStation
2001	Weakest Link	Activision	Microsoft Windows, PlayStation, PlayStation 2
2001	Crash Bandicoot: The Wrath of Cortex	Vivendi Universal Games	GameCube, PlayStation 2, Xbox
2002	Haven: Call of the King	Midway Games	PlayStation 2
2003	Finding Nemo	THQ	GameCube, PlayStation 2, Xbox
2004	Crash Twinsanity	Vivendi Universal Games	PlayStation 2, Xbox
2005	Lego Star Wars: The Video Game	Eidos Interactive/Giant Interactive Entertainment (PlayStation 2, Xbox, GameCube, Windows); Feral Interactive (OS X)	GameCube, Mac OS X, Microsoft Windows, PlayStation 2, Xbox
2005	F1 Grand Prix	Sony Computer Entertainment	PlayStation Portable
2005	The Chronicles of Narnia: The Lion, the Witch and the Wardrobe	Buena Vista Games	GameCube, Microsoft Windows, PlayStation 2, Xbox
2005	World Rally Championship	Sony Computer Entertainment	PlayStation Portable
2006	Super Monkey Ball Adventure	Sega	GameCube, PlayStation 2, PlayStation Portable
2006	Lego Star Wars II: The Original Trilogy	LucasArts (PlayStation 2, Xbox, GameCube, Windows); Feral Interactive (OS X)	GameCube, Mac OS X, Microsoft Windows, PlayStation 2, Xbox, Xbox 360
2006	Bionicle Heroes	Eidos Interactive	GameCube, Microsoft Windows, PlayStation 2, Wii, Xbox 360
2007	Transformers: The Game	Activision	Microsoft Windows, PlayStation 2, PlayStation 3, Wii, Xbox 360
2007	Lego Star Wars: The Complete Saga	LucasArts (PlayStation 3, Xbox 360, Windows, Wii); Feral Interactive (OS X); Warner Bros. Interactive Entertainment (iOS, Android)	Android, iOS, Mac OS X, Microsoft Windows, PlayStation 3, Wii, Xbox 360
2008	Lego Indiana Jones: The Original Adventures	LucasArts; Feral Interactive (OS X)	Mac OS X, Microsoft Windows, OS X, PlayStation 2, PlayStation 3, PlayStation Portable, Wii, Xbox 360
2008	Lego Batman: The Videogame	Warner Bros. Interactive Entertainment; Feral Interactive (OS X)	Mac OS X, Microsoft Windows, PlayStation 2, PlayStation 3, PlayStation Portable, Wii, Xbox 360
2008	The Chronicles of Narnia: Prince Caspian	Disney Interactive Studios	Microsoft Windows, PlayStation 2, PlayStation 3, Wii, Xbox 360, Wii
2009	Lego Indiana Jones 2: The Adventure Continues	LucasArts; Feral Interactive (OS X)	Mac OS X, Microsoft Windows, PlayStation 3, Wii, Xbox 360
2010	Lego Harry Potter: Years 1–4	Warner Bros. Interactive Entertainment; Feral Interactive (OS X)	Mac OS X, Microsoft Windows, PlayStation 3, Wii, Xbox 360
2011	Lego Star Wars III: The Clone Wars	LucasArts; Feral Interactive (OS X)	Microsoft Windows, OS X, PlayStation 3, Wii, Xbox 360
2011	Lego Pirates of the Caribbean: The Video Game	Disney Interactive Studios	Mac OS X, Microsoft Windows, PlayStation 3, Wii, Xbox 360
2011	Lego Harry Potter: Years 5–7	Warner Bros. Interactive Entertainment; Feral Interactive (OS X)	Microsoft Windows, OS X, PlayStation 3, Wii, Xbox 360
2012	Lego Batman 2: DC Super Heroes	Warner Bros. Interactive Entertainment; Feral Interactive (OS X)	Microsoft Windows, OS X, PlayStation 3, Wii, Wii U, Xbox 360
2012	Lego The Lord of the Rings	Warner Bros. Interactive Entertainment; Feral Interactive (OS X)	Microsoft Windows, OS X, PlayStation 3, Wii, Xbox 360
2013	Lego Marvel Super Heroes	Warner Bros. Interactive Entertainment; Feral Interactive (OS X)	Microsoft Windows, Nintendo Switch, OS X, PlayStation 3, PlayStation 4, Xbox One, Wii U, Xbox 360
2014	Lego The Hobbit	Warner Bros. Interactive Entertainment; Feral Interactive (OS X)	Microsoft Windows, OS X, PlayStation 3, PlayStation 4, Wii U, Xbox 360, Xbox One
2014	Lego Batman 3: Beyond Gotham	Warner Bros. Interactive Entertainment; Feral Interactive (OS X)	Microsoft Windows, OS X, PlayStation 3, PlayStation 4, Wii U, Xbox 360, Xbox One
2015	Lego Dimensions	Warner Bros. Interactive Entertainment	PlayStation 3, PlayStation 4, Wii U, Xbox 360, Xbox One
2016	Lego Marvel's Avengers	Warner Bros. Interactive Entertainment; Feral Interactive (OS X)	Microsoft Windows, OS X, PlayStation 3, PlayStation 4, Wii U, Xbox 360, Xbox One
2017	Lego Worlds	Warner Bros. Interactive Entertainment	Microsoft Windows, Nintendo Switch, PlayStation 4, Xbox One
2017	Lego Marvel Super Heroes 2	Warner Bros. Interactive Entertainment; Feral Interactive (macOS)	macOS, Microsoft Windows, Nintendo Switch, PlayStation 4, Xbox One
2018	Lego DC Super-Villains	Warner Bros. Interactive Entertainment; Feral Interactive (macOS)	macOS, Microsoft Windows, Nintendo Switch, PlayStation 4, Xbox One
2019	The Lego Movie 2 Videogame	Warner Bros. Interactive Entertainment; Feral Interactive (macOS)	macOS, Microsoft Windows, Nintendo Switch, PlayStation 4, Xbox One
2022	Lego Star Wars: The Skywalker Saga	Warner Bros. Games	Microsoft Windows, Nintendo Switch, PlayStation 4, PlayStation 5, Xbox One, Xbox Series X/S
2026	Lego Batman: Legacy of the Dark Knight	Warner Bros. Games	Microsoft Windows, Nintendo Switch 2, PlayStation 5, Xbox Series X/S
