= Toy Story 2 (video game) =

1999 video game

- Developer: Tiertex Design Studios
- Publishers: NA: THQ; PAL: Activision
- Artist: Kevin Knot
- Series: Toy Story
- Platform: Game Boy Color
- Release: NA: November 11, 1999; EU: 2000
- Genre: Platform
- Mode: Single-player

Toy Story 2 is a 1999 side-scrolling platform game for Game Boy Color based on the film of the same name developed by Tiertex Design Studios. It was released in November 1999 in North America with the European version releasing the following year. The premise of the game loosely follows the original film with players taking control of Buzz Lightyear on a mission to rescue Woody by traversing through stages.

== Gameplay ==
The Game Boy Color version is a side-scrolling platform game unrelated to the other versions. The player controls Buzz, who can jump, run, and shoot his laser at enemies. It features 11 levels, including two bonus levels that can be accessed if the player collects all the coins located in certain levels. Buzz's running and jumping are both done through the B button. While standing motionless, the player can jump and move across gaps, whereas running is initiated by pressing the B button while moving. Gameplay is saved through a password feature.

== Development ==
Toy Story 2 was developed by Tiertex Design Studios, which also developed the Game Boy version of the original Toy Story game. The Game Boy Color version was published by THQ in North America and was also released in the U.S. in November 11, 1999. It was re-released in 2026 as part of the Toy Story: Retro Roundup! compilation.

== Reception ==
Reception

Review scores
Publication	Score
AllGame	2.5/5
Game Informer	5.25/10
GameSpot	6.9/10
IGN	5/10
Official Nintendo Magazine	71%
Superjuegos	67/100
Video Games (DE)	2/5

Toy Story 2 received average reviews, with Game Informer criticizing its lack of originality. It was also criticized for its control setup with regards to running and jumping; IGN's Craig Harris wrote that "granted, you can't do much with only two action buttons, but it's obvious Tiertex wanted three". Doug Trueman of GameSpot praised Buzz's animation but stated that many of the other toys in the game did not look as good. Trueman considered the sound and music to be average, and stated that background graphics often blended in too well with the foreground. Weiss called the Game Boy Color version an "adequate, but very forgettable and very short game", while saying it can become quickly tedious. Weiss believed the addition of boss enemies and more action would have helped, although he considered the animation and artwork to be above average for a Game Boy Color game. Official Nintendo Magazine also found the game lacking in action and its visuals "drab". Superjuegos writer J.C. Mayerick highlighted the "catchy music" and the ninth stage, but overall criticized it as the first Toy Story Game Boy game released years prior, only with the addition of color; he concluded that young players who are attached to the Toy Story's characters would not be interested in a Game Boy game, thus the game had little value in the marketplace. He condemned its mediocre graphics and poor animation. THQ president and CEO Brian Farrell said the game was a hit for THQ during Q4 of 1999.
