= Buzz Lightyear of Star Command (video game) =

2000 video game

- Developer: Traveller's Tales
- Publisher: Activision (Note: The Windows version was published by Disney Interactive)
- Composer: Keith Leary (Game Audio Ltd.)
- Series: Toy Story
- Platforms: PlayStation; Dreamcast; Game Boy Color; Windows
- Release: Dreamcast: NA: October 4, 2000; EU: February 9, 2001; PlayStation: NA: October 11, 2000; EU: February 2, 2001; Windows: EU: November 10, 2000; Game Boy Color: NA: November 17, 2000; EU: February 9, 2001
- Genres: Platform, shooter
- Mode: Single-player

Buzz Lightyear of Star Command is an action-adventure platform video game developed by Traveller's Tales and published by Disney Interactive and Activision in 2000. It is based on the animated series of the same name, a spin-off of the Toy Story franchise. It was released for Dreamcast, PlayStation, Microsoft Windows, and Game Boy Color. A version for the Nintendo 64 was planned but was later cancelled for unknown reasons.

The PlayStation version was re-released digitally on PlayStation 4 and PlayStation 5 on December 19, 2023. The PlayStation and Game Boy Color versions of the game were re-released in 2026 as part of the Toy Story: Retro Roundup! compilation.

== Gameplay ==
Buzz Lightyear fighting the second villain of the game, Gravitina, who has a colored shield which indicates which weapon will be effective against them (Windows version)

Buzz Lightyear of Star Command is an action shooter platform video game played from a third-person perspective. The game takes place on various fictional planets. The player controls Buzz Lightyear, who must race a villain to the end of each level, where a battle then occurs between the two. During the race, the player must defend against various enemies who try to stop Buzz. Throughout each level, the player can collect coins and use them to purchase weapon upgrades, shields, as well as vehicles, such as a hoverboard, a jet bike, and a jet pack. The player can also pay for level shortcuts, such as teleportation machines and boost pads, which launches Buzz further into the level.

At a certain point in each level, Buzz can summon his partner Booster, who stomps the ground to kill all nearby enemies. If the main villain reaches the end of the level before Buzz, then the player has 15 seconds to reach the end before the villain escapes. If the player beats the villain to the end of the level, then Buzz's partner Mira briefly arrives to drain some of the villain's health, making the battle easier for the player. The player's final battle is with Evil Emperor Zurg. Medals are required to advance to later levels, and can be earned by collecting Little Green Men scattered around levels and collecting enough money to pass its mark. After winning a level, the player can then replay it through two game modes, which also award medals if won. In one game mode, the player goes through the level to retrieve pieces of Buzz's robotic partner, XR; the other game mode is a time challenge, in which the player must reach the level's finish line in time.

The home console and Windows versions of the game have 14 levels and include clips from the television series, while the Game Boy Color version features 12 levels. The Game Boy Color version is an action game viewed from a top-down perspective, and also includes the same vehicles as the other versions.

== Reception ==
Reception

Aggregate scores
Aggregator	Score		
Aggregator	Dreamcast	GBC	PS
GameRankings	57%	N/A	65%
Metacritic	55/100	N/A	54/100

Review scores
Publication	Score		
Publication	Dreamcast	GBC	PS
AllGame	2.5/5	N/A	N/A
Electronic Gaming Monthly	7.5/10	N/A	7/10
Eurogamer	3/10	N/A	N/A
Game Informer	N/A	N/A	5.5/10
GameFan	79%	N/A	N/A
GamePro	N/A	N/A	2.5/5
GameRevolution	D−	N/A	N/A
GameSpot	4.9/10	N/A	4.9/10
Hyper	N/A	3/10	N/A
IGN	6.5/10	4/10	6/10
Nintendo Power	N/A	6.4/10	N/A
Official U.S. PlayStation Magazine	N/A	N/A	3.5/5

The Dreamcast and PlayStation versions received "mixed or average reviews" according to Metacritic, and were criticized for the camera perspective, with GamePro writing that it "swoops around like a roller coaster gone mad". Some reviewers criticized the inclusion of clips from the television series, stating that they had little relevance to the game's story and levels. Some critics also believed that Buzz's dialogue was lacking the character's bravado and wit from the Toy Story films, and others stated that the game would appeal primarily to younger children.

Kristian Brogger of Game Informer reviewed the PlayStation version and was critical of its graphics and gameplay. Adam Cleveland of IGN praised the PlayStation version for its graphics and the inclusion of Bobcat Goldthwait as a voice actor, but he criticized the "forgettable" music. Cleveland called the racing portions "downright pointless" and considered the game's genre difficult to pinpoint "because it tries to paste itself together with elements from other games". Cleveland also questioned why each boss enemy cannot be harmed until the end of the race, and stated that he was not very satisfied with the game. Official U.S. PlayStation Magazine considered the game a "muddy mix of platformer, shooter and arcade racer" that "doesn't quite work", largely due to the controls, particularly the lack of a lock-on aiming feature. The magazine also considered the levels to be uninspired.

Reviewing the Dreamcast version, Jon Thompson of AllGame found the game's concept to be repetitive, but stated that the sound and music were good. In comparison to the PlayStation version, Electronic Gaming Monthly believed that the Dreamcast version was graphically superior, especially its frame rate, while Miguel Lopez of GameSpot believed that the PlayStation version had a superior frame rate. GamePro also praised the PlayStation version's frame rate, and its cartoon-style graphics, but was critical of enemies that respawn "very quickly". Tom Bramwell of Eurogamer mentioned graphical issues with the Dreamcast version and stated that its only redeeming feature was its array of power-ups.

Michael J. Steinhart of PC Magazine praised the Windows version for its "crisp graphics and smooth, absorbing action". IGN's Marc Nix criticized the Game Boy Color version for its graphics and poor weapon arsenal. Nix was disappointed by the inability to perform hoverboard tricks as in the home game console versions, and was critical of the controls, writing that Buzz moves too heavily. Nix noted that it was possible for the player to pass up the villain being chased, resulting in the player having to wait at the end of the course for the villain to arrive in order to apprehend them, as they cannot be stopped prior to the end of the course; Nix considered this concept "pretty silly".
