= Toy Story (video game) =

1995 video game

- Cover art
- Developer: Traveller's Tales (Note: Ported to Windows by Disney Interactive. Tiertex developed the Game Boy version.)
- Publishers: Disney Interactive: EU: Sega (Mega Drive, PAL); JP: Capcom (SF, JP); NA: Black Pearl Software (Game Boy, NA)
- Producers: Craig Annis; Steve Riding
- Designers: Jon Burton; Andy Ingram
- Programmers: Chris Stanforth; Jon Burton; Mike Follin; Paul Hunter; David Dootson
- Artists: Andy Ingram; Bev Bush; James Cunliffe; Dave Burton; Oliver Wade; Tamara Holcomb
- Composers: Andy Blythe Marten Joustra; Allister Brimble (SNES); Mark Ortiz (Game Boy)
- Series: Toy Story
- Platforms: Sega Genesis; Super NES; Game Boy; Microsoft Windows
- Release: Sega Genesis: NA: 21 November 1995; EU: 29 March 1996; Super NES: NA: December 1995; EU: June 1996; JP: 26 April 1996; Game Boy: NA: May 1996; EU: 1996; Microsoft Windows: NA: 31 October 1996
- Genre: Platform
- Mode: Single-player

Toy Story is a 1995 platform game developed by Traveller's Tales and published by Disney Interactive for the Sega Genesis, Super Nintendo Entertainment System, Game Boy, and Microsoft Windows. It is based on the 1995 computer-animated Pixar film of the same name.

== Gameplay ==
Players control Woody through several stages that encompass the entire plot of the film. Several obstacles lie between the player and the goal of each level, including an assortment of enemies. Woody is equipped with a pullstring whip, which will temporarily tie up opponents, letting Woody pass by unharmed. It cannot, however, kill enemies (with the lone exception of Nightmare Buzz, the only boss in the game to be permanently defeated through the whip). This whip can also latch onto certain hooks, letting Woody swing above perilous terrain.

The game occasionally changes genres for a stage. Players control R.C. in two stages: one in which Woody knocks Buzz out a window, the other in which they both race back to the moving truck. Both play largely the same; the game takes an overhead view of the level, giving the players basic acceleration, braking and steering, and tasking players with reaching the end of the stage while not running out of batteries (which drain constantly, but can be replenished by bumping them out of Buzz in the former stage, and merely finding them on the ground in the latter). Another stage is played from a first-person perspective as Woody searches through a maze to find alien squeaky toys lost inside the claw machine and return them to the play area, where the rest of the alien toys reside, all within a time limit.

The Sega Genesis version has 18 levels, while the Super NES and Microsoft Windows versions have 17. The Game Boy version features only 10 levels, mostly featuring platforming levels. The Genesis and Windows versions have an additional racing level named "Day-toy-na", absent from the other versions, in which Woody rides R.C. from the moving van to Buzz. The Windows version lacks "Really Inside the Claw Machine".

== Development and release ==
The Game Boy version was developed by Tiertex Design Studios and the Windows version was developed by the same Disney Interactive in-house team that created Maui Mallard in Cold Shadow, while the other versions were developed by Traveller's Tales. The Sega Genesis version of Toy Story was the lead version. The game features 3D-rendered graphics, and Pixar provided Traveller's Tales with the film's animations of Woody and Scud. The development team and Pixar initially had issues rendering the animations with correct lighting that would allow the development team to convert them for the game. Pixar provided final animations to the team only two weeks before the game was to be submitted to Sega for final approval. If the game did not receive approval the first time, its release would have been delayed, failing to coincide with the theatrical release of the film. As a precaution, Traveller's Tales rendered their own animations of Woody in case Pixar could not provide them on time.

Jon Burton, the founder of Traveller's Tales, served as both the designer and programmer for the game. To pass Sega's strict approval process, Burton disguised game glitches as part of the game; instead of receiving an error message, game testers would be sent to a bonus minigame, which Burton said was part of the game. While the film had vibrant, vivid colors, the Genesis had only a limited array of colors. As a partial solution, Traveller's Tales utilized a special mode that provided access to additional shades of red, green, and blue. The soundtrack features instrumental versions of two Randy Newman songs from the film, "Strange Things" and "You've Got a Friend in Me".

The game was published by Disney Interactive. In the United States, the Genesis version was released on November 21, 1995, coinciding a day prior to the film's release. The Super NES version followed shortly thereafter. The Game Boy version was released in May 1996 and the Windows version was released on 31 October 1996. In Europe, the Genesis version was released on March 29, 1996, while the Super NES version was released in June 1996.

In Taiwan, an unlicensed and pirated port was developed for the NES in 1997, which circulated in Europe and Russia. The port was made by Ei-How Yang, an ex-Sachen developer.

The Genesis, SNES, and Game Boy versions of the game were re-released in 2026 as part of the Toy Story: Retro Roundup! compilation.

== Reception ==
=== Reviews ===
Reception

Review scores
Publication	Score
AllGame	PC: 3.5/5; SMD: 3.5/5; SNES: 3.5/5
Computer and Video Games	SMD: 92/100; SNES: 4/5
Electronic Gaming Monthly	SMD: 6.875/10; SNES: 6.75/10
EP Daily	PC: 8/10; SMD: 9/10
Famitsu	6/10, 6/10, 7/10, 7/10 (SNES)
Game Informer	SMD: 8.75/10; SNES: 8.75/10
GameFan	SMD: 87% SNES: 80%
GamePro	GB: 13.5/20; SMD: 15/20; SNES: 14/20
GameSpot	PC: 6.4/10
Jeuxvideo.com	SMD: 17/20; SNES: 17/20
M! Games	SMD: 62% SNES: 63%
Mean Machines Sega	SMD: 92/100
Next Generation	SMD: 4/5
Nintendo Power	SNES: 14.3/20
Official Nintendo Magazine	GB: 77/100; SNES: 92/100
PC Gamer (UK)	PC: 69%
PC Gamer (US)	PC: 27%
Superjuegos	GB: 79/100; SNES: 90/100
Super Play	SNES: 79%
Total!	GB: 72/100; SNES: 90/100

Toy Story was received positively on the Genesis and SNES, while reception to the PC version was mixed. The game was praised for its impressive visuals, varied gameplay, and the PC version's enhanced soundtrack, but criticized for its poor controls and uneven difficulty, with some levels which reviewers found to be too frustratingly difficult, particularly for the young target audience. The visuals were best received on the Genesis version due to the game's 3D-rendered graphics, which had several precedents on the SNES and PC but were completely new to the Genesis. Critics were varied in their overall impressions; GamePro concluded that "despite the stunning graphics, Toy Story's uninspiring gameplay makes for merely fleeting fun", while Game Informer decreed the game "a humorous and fun adventure that will certainly entertain everyone in the whole family". Roger Burchill of Super Play wrote that while the Genesis version "marked a new high point" in graphics and gameplay, the Super NES version "can't help but be compared to Donkey Kong Country 2 and that's a comparison where it will lose every time".

Mark East of GameSpot praised the soundtrack of the Windows version but had several minor criticisms of the game, including keyboard control issues, delayed sound effects, and brief pauses that occur when the soundtrack restarts. Adam Douglas of PC Gamer considered it to be rushed, unoriginal, difficult, and frustrating, and concluded that the game failed to recapture "the magic of the film".

The Game Boy version received little coverage. A brief review in GamePro opined that it did not live up to the legacy of the film and previous versions of the game, citing "plodding and repetitive" gameplay, rudimentary graphics, and the inaccuracy of Woody's drawstring.

=== Sales ===
Eurogamer reported in 2018 of Toy Story garnering "millions of sales" upon release; according to Jon Burton, this changed other companies' business models to have games launch at the same time the film was released. According to Disney Interactive, the Super NES and Genesis versions were both "tremendous successes", though a Super NES chip shortage prevented them from producing as many copies of the Super NES version as they believed they could have sold.

=== Awards ===
Toy Story was nominated for the Video Software Dealers Association's "Video Game of the Year" for 1995, losing to Donkey Kong Country 2. In 1996, GamesMaster ranked the Mega Drive version 3rd on their "The GamesMaster Mega Drive Top 10."

== See also ==
- List of Disney video games
