= List of Warner Bros. Games video games =

Warner Bros. Games (formerly known as Warner Bros. Interactive Entertainment) is an American video game development and publishing company that is a division of the Global Streaming & Interactive Entertainment unit of Skydance. The company has published numerous video games based on both licensed properties as well as original content. Video games that the company has published include those in the Batman: Arkham, F.E.A.R., Game Party, Mortal Kombat, and Scribblenauts series as well as those based on Warner Bros. films and animations, DC Comics' works, Lego toys, J.R.R. Tolkien's Middle-earth, Harry Potter, and Sesame Street.

== List of video games ==
Title	System	Release date	Developer(s)	Ref.
The Matrix Online	Microsoft Windows	March 22, 2005	Monolith Productions	
Friends: The One with All the Trivia	Microsoft Windows	November 15, 2005	Artech Digital Entertainment	
Friends: The One with All the Trivia	PlayStation 2	December 12, 2005	Artech Digital Entertainment	
Justice League Heroes	Nintendo DS	October 17, 2006	Sensory Sweep Studios	
Justice League Heroes	PlayStation 2	October 17, 2006	Snowblind Studios	
Justice League Heroes	Xbox	October 17, 2006	Snowblind Studios	
Justice League Heroes: The Flash	Game Boy Advance	October 17, 2006	WayForward	
Justice League Heroes	PlayStation Portable	November 22, 2006	Snowblind Studios	
300: March to Glory	PlayStation Portable	February 27, 2007	Collision Studios	
Looney Tunes: Acme Arsenal	PlayStation 2	October 9, 2007	Redtribe	
Looney Tunes: Acme Arsenal	Wii	October 9, 2007	Redtribe	
Looney Tunes: Acme Arsenal	Xbox 360	October 9, 2007	Redtribe	
Looney Tunes: Duck Amuck	Nintendo DS	October 9, 2007	WayForward	
Speed Racer: The Videogame	Nintendo DS	May 6, 2008	Virtuos	
Speed Racer: The Videogame	Wii	May 6, 2008	Sidhe	
Looney Tunes: Cartoon Conductor	Nintendo DS	June 10, 2008	Amaze Entertainment	
Speed Racer: The Videogame	PlayStation 2	September 16, 2008	Sidhe	
Lego Batman: The Videogame	Microsoft Windows	September 23, 2008	Traveller's Tales	
Lego Batman: The Videogame	Nintendo DS	September 23, 2008	TT Fusion	
Lego Batman: The Videogame	PlayStation 2	September 23, 2008	Traveller's Tales	
Lego Batman: The Videogame	PlayStation 3	September 23, 2008	Traveller's Tales	
Lego Batman: The Videogame	PlayStation Portable	September 23, 2008	Traveller's Tales	
Lego Batman: The Videogame	Wii	September 23, 2008	Traveller's Tales	
Lego Batman: The Videogame	Xbox 360	September 23, 2008	Traveller's Tales	
Guinness World Records: The Videogame	Nintendo DS	November 11, 2008	TT Fusion	
Guinness World Records: The Videogame	Wii	November 11, 2008	TT Fusion	
F.E.A.R. 2: Project Origin	Microsoft Windows	February 10, 2009	Monolith Productions	
F.E.A.R. 2: Project Origin	PlayStation 3	February 10, 2009	Monolith Productions	
F.E.A.R. 2: Project Origin	Xbox 360	February 10, 2009	Monolith Productions	
Watchmen: The End Is Nigh	Microsoft Windows	February 4, 2009	Deadline Games	
Watchmen: The End Is Nigh	PlayStation 3	February 4, 2009	Deadline Games	
Watchmen: The End Is Nigh	Xbox 360	February 4, 2009	Deadline Games	
Lego Batman: The Videogame	Mac	April 9, 2009	Traveller's Tales / Feral Interactive	
Lego Battles	Nintendo DS	June 9, 2009	Hellbent Games	
Guinness World Records: The Videogame	Wii	June 19, 2009	TT Fusion	
Batman: Arkham Asylum	PlayStation 3	August 25, 2009	Rocksteady Studios	
Batman: Arkham Asylum	Xbox 360	August 25, 2009	Rocksteady Studios	
The Clique: Diss and Make Up	Nintendo DS	August 25, 2009	Gorilla Systems	
Batman: Arkham Asylum	Microsoft Windows	September 15, 2009	Rocksteady Studios	
Scribblenauts	Nintendo DS	September 15, 2009	5th Cell	
Scooby-Doo! First Frights	Nintendo DS	September 22, 2009	Torus Games	
Scooby-Doo! First Frights	PlayStation 2	September 22, 2009	Torus Games	
Scooby-Doo! First Frights	Wii	September 22, 2009	Torus Games	
Game Party 3	Wii	October 6, 2009	FarSight Studios	
Where the Wild Things Are	Nintendo DS	October 13, 2009	WayForward	
Where the Wild Things Are	PlayStation 3	October 13, 2009	WayForward	
Where the Wild Things Are	Wii	October 13, 2009	WayForward	
Where the Wild Things Are	Xbox 360	October 13, 2009	WayForward	
TouchMaster 3	Nintendo DS	October 27, 2009	Hijinx Studios	
Lego Rock Band	Nintendo DS	November 3, 2009	Harmonix / Backbone Entertainment	
Lego Rock Band	PlayStation 3	November 3, 2009	Harmonix / Traveller's Tales	
Lego Rock Band	Wii	November 3, 2009	Harmonix / Traveller's Tales	
Lego Rock Band	Xbox 360	November 3, 2009	Harmonix / Traveller's Tales	
Scene It? Bright Lights! Big Screen!	PlayStation 3	November 17, 2009	Artificial Mind and Movement	
Scene It? Bright Lights! Big Screen!	Wii	November 17, 2009	Artificial Mind and Movement	
Scene It? Bright Lights! Big Screen!	Xbox 360	November 17, 2009	Artificial Mind and Movement	
Vacation Isle: Beach Party	Wii	June 8, 2010	FarSight Studios	
Lego Harry Potter: Years 1–4	Microsoft Windows	June 29, 2010	Traveller's Tales	
Lego Harry Potter: Years 1–4	Nintendo DS	June 29, 2010	Traveller's Tales	
Lego Harry Potter: Years 1–4	PlayStation 3	June 29, 2010	Traveller's Tales	
Lego Harry Potter: Years 1–4	PlayStation Portable	June 29, 2010	Traveller's Tales	
Lego Harry Potter: Years 1–4	Wii	June 29, 2010	Traveller's Tales	
Lego Harry Potter: Years 1–4	Xbox 360	June 29, 2010	Traveller's Tales	
Galactic Taz Ball	Nintendo DS	August 10, 2010	WayForward	
The Bachelor: The Video Game	Nintendo DS	August 25, 2010	Ludia	
The Bachelor: The Video Game	Wii	August 31, 2010	Ludia	
Batman: The Brave and the Bold – The Videogame	Nintendo DS	September 7, 2010	WayForward	
Batman: The Brave and the Bold – The Videogame	Wii	September 7, 2010	WayForward	
Legend of the Guardians: The Owls of Ga'Hoole	Nintendo DS	September 14, 2010	Tantalus Media	
Legend of the Guardians: The Owls of Ga'Hoole	PlayStation 3	September 14, 2010	Tantalus Media	
Legend of the Guardians: The Owls of Ga'Hoole	Wii	September 14, 2010	Tantalus Media	
Legend of the Guardians: The Owls of Ga'Hoole	Xbox 360	September 14, 2010	Tantalus Media	
The Lord of the Rings: Aragorn's Quest	Nintendo DS	September 14, 2010	TT Fusion	
The Lord of the Rings: Aragorn's Quest	PlayStation 2	September 14, 2010	TT Fusion	
The Lord of the Rings: Aragorn's Quest	PlayStation 3	September 14, 2010	TT Fusion	
The Lord of the Rings: Aragorn's Quest	PlayStation Portable	September 14, 2010	TT Fusion	
The Lord of the Rings: Aragorn's Quest	Wii	September 14, 2010	Headstrong Games	
Scooby-Doo! and the Spooky Swamp	Nintendo DS	September 14, 2010	Torus Games	
Scooby-Doo! and the Spooky Swamp	PlayStation 2	September 14, 2010	Torus Games	
Scooby-Doo! and the Spooky Swamp	Wii	September 14, 2010	Torus Games	
Sesame Street: Cookie's Counting Carnival	Microsoft Windows	September 19, 2010	Black Lantern Studios	
Sesame Street: Cookie's Counting Carnival	Nintendo DS	September 19, 2010	Black Lantern Studios	
Sesame Street: Cookie's Counting Carnival	Wii	September 19, 2010	Black Lantern Studios	
Sesame Street: Elmo's A-to-Zoo Adventure	Microsoft Windows	September 19, 2010	Black Lantern Studios	
Sesame Street: Elmo's A-to-Zoo Adventure	Nintendo DS	September 19, 2010	Black Lantern Studios	
Sesame Street: Elmo's A-to-Zoo Adventure	Wii	September 19, 2010	Black Lantern Studios	
Super Scribblenauts	Nintendo DS	October 12, 2010	5th Cell	
Lego Universe	Mac	October 26, 2010	NetDevil	
Lego Universe	Microsoft Windows	October 26, 2010	NetDevil	
Game Party: In Motion	Xbox 360	November 18, 2010	FarSight Studios	
Lego Harry Potter: Years 1–4	iOS	November 19, 2010	Traveller's Tales	
TouchMaster: Connect	Nintendo DS	December 7, 2010	Double Tap Games	
DC Universe Online	Microsoft Windows	January 11, 2011	Sony Online Entertainment	
DC Universe Online	PlayStation 3	January 11, 2011	Sony Online Entertainment	
Lego Harry Potter: Years 1–4	Mac	February 22, 2011	Traveller's Tales / Feral Interactive	
Tapper World Tour	iOS	March 16, 2011	Square One Studios	
Lego Battles: Ninjago	Nintendo DS	April 12, 2011	Hellbent Games	
Mortal Kombat	PlayStation 3	April 19, 2011	NetherRealm Studios	
Mortal Kombat	Xbox 360	April 19, 2011	NetherRealm Studios	
Green Lantern: Rise of the Manhunters	iOS	June 7, 2011	Other Ocean Interactive	
Green Lantern: Rise of the Manhunters	Nintendo 3DS	June 7, 2011	Griptonite Games	
Green Lantern: Rise of the Manhunters	Nintendo DS	June 7, 2011	Griptonite Games	
Green Lantern: Rise of the Manhunters	PlayStation 3	June 7, 2011	Double Helix Games	
Green Lantern: Rise of the Manhunters	Wii	June 7, 2011	Griptonite Games	
Green Lantern: Rise of the Manhunters	Xbox 360	June 7, 2011	Double Helix Games	
F.E.A.R. 3	Microsoft Windows	June 21, 2011	Day 1 Studios	
F.E.A.R. 3	PlayStation 3	June 21, 2011	Day 1 Studios	
F.E.A.R. 3	Xbox 360	June 21, 2011	Day 1 Studios	
Bastion	Xbox 360	July 20, 2011	Supergiant Games	
Sesame Street: Ready, Set, Grover!	Nintendo DS	August 2, 2011	Griptonite Games	
Sesame Street: Ready, Set, Grover!	Wii	August 2, 2011	Griptonite Games	
Bastion	Microsoft Windows	August 16, 2011	Supergiant Games	
Mortal Kombat Arcade Kollection	PlayStation 3	August 30, 2011	Other Ocean Interactive	
Mortal Kombat Arcade Kollection	Xbox 360	August 30, 2011	Other Ocean Interactive	
Dolphin Tale: Fling a Fish	Web browser	September 2, 2011	Ansca Mobile	
Dolphin Tale: Fling a Fish	iOS	September 2, 2011	Ansca Mobile	
Sesame Street: Once Upon a Monster	Xbox 360	October 11, 2011	Double Fine Productions	
Scribblenauts Remix	iOS	October 12, 2011	5th Cell / Iron Galaxy Studios	
Batman: Arkham Asylum	Mac	October 13, 2011	Rocksteady Studios / Feral Interactive	
Batman: Arkham City	PlayStation 3	October 18, 2011	Rocksteady Studios	
Batman: Arkham City	Xbox 360	October 18, 2011	Rocksteady Studios	
The Lord of the Rings: War in the North	Microsoft Windows	November 1, 2011	Snowblind Studios	
The Lord of the Rings: War in the North	PlayStation 3	November 1, 2011	Snowblind Studios	
The Lord of the Rings: War in the North	Xbox 360	November 1, 2011	Snowblind Studios	
Happy Feet Two: Erik's Adventure	iOS	November 4, 2011	Budge Studios	
Lego Harry Potter: Years 5–7	Nintendo 3DS	November 11, 2011	Traveller's Tales	
Lego Harry Potter: Years 5–7	Nintendo DS	November 11, 2011	Traveller's Tales	
Lego Harry Potter: Years 5–7	PlayStation 3	November 11, 2011	Traveller's Tales	
Lego Harry Potter: Years 5–7	PlayStation Portable	November 11, 2011	Traveller's Tales	
Lego Harry Potter: Years 5–7	Wii	November 11, 2011	Traveller's Tales	
Lego Harry Potter: Years 5–7	Xbox 360	November 11, 2011	Traveller's Tales	
Happy Feet Two: The Videogame	Nintendo 3DS	November 18, 2011	WayForward	
Happy Feet Two: The Videogame	Nintendo DS	November 18, 2011	WayForward	
Happy Feet Two: The Videogame	PlayStation 3	November 18, 2011	KMM Interactive Entertainment	
Happy Feet Two: The Videogame	Wii	November 18, 2011	KMM Interactive Entertainment	
Happy Feet Two: The Videogame	Xbox 360	November 18, 2011	KMM Interactive Entertainment	
Lego Harry Potter: Years 5–7	Microsoft Windows	November 18, 2011	Traveller's Tales	
Batman: Arkham City	Microsoft Windows	November 22, 2011	Rocksteady Studios	
Batman: Arkham City Lockdown	iOS	December 8, 2011	NetherRealm Studios	
Bastion	Web browser	December 9, 2011	Supergiant Games	
Mortal Kombat Arcade Kollection	Microsoft Windows	February 2, 2012	Other Ocean Interactive	
Gotham City Impostors	Microsoft Windows	February 6, 2012	Monolith Productions	
Gotham City Impostors	PlayStation 3	February 7, 2012	Monolith Productions	
Gotham City Impostors	Xbox 360	February 8, 2012	Monolith Productions	
Midway Arcade	iOS	February 23, 2012	Backbone Entertainment	
Lego Harry Potter: Years 5–7	Mac	March 1, 2012	Traveller's Tales / Feral Interactive	
Lego Harry Potter: Years 5–7	PlayStation Vita	March 6, 2012	Traveller's Tales	
Bastion	Mac	April 28, 2012	Supergiant Games	
Mortal Kombat	PlayStation Vita	May 1, 2012	NetherRealm Studios	
Lego Harry Potter: Years 5–7	iOS	May 3, 2012	Traveller's Tales	
Bastion	Linux	May 31, 2012	Supergiant Games	
Lollipop Chainsaw	PlayStation 3	June 12, 2012	Grasshopper Manufacture	
Lollipop Chainsaw	Xbox 360	June 12, 2012	Grasshopper Manufacture	
Sesame Street: Elmo's Musical Monsterpiece	Nintendo DS	June 15, 2012	Griptonite Games	
Sesame Street: Elmo's Musical Monsterpiece	Wii	June 15, 2012	Griptonite Games	
Lego Batman 2: DC Super Heroes	Microsoft Windows	June 19, 2012	Traveller's Tales	
Lego Batman 2: DC Super Heroes	Nintendo 3DS	June 19, 2012	Traveller's Tales	
Lego Batman 2: DC Super Heroes	Nintendo DS	June 19, 2012	Traveller's Tales	
Lego Batman 2: DC Super Heroes	PlayStation 3	June 19, 2012	Traveller's Tales	
Lego Batman 2: DC Super Heroes	PlayStation Vita	June 19, 2012	Traveller's Tales	
Lego Batman 2: DC Super Heroes	Wii	June 19, 2012	Traveller's Tales	
Lego Batman 2: DC Super Heroes	Xbox 360	June 19, 2012	Traveller's Tales	
Bastion	iOS	August 30, 2012	Supergiant Games	
Lego Batman 2: DC Super Heroes	Mac	September 6, 2012	Traveller's Tales / Feral Interactive	
Harry Potter for Kinect	Xbox 360	October 9, 2012	Eurocom	
Spy Hunter	Nintendo 3DS	October 9, 2012	TT Fusion	
Spy Hunter	PlayStation Vita	October 9, 2012	TT Fusion	
Lego The Lord of the Rings	Nintendo 3DS	October 30, 2012	TT Fusion	
Lego The Lord of the Rings	Nintendo DS	October 30, 2012	TT Fusion	
Lego The Lord of the Rings	PlayStation Vita	October 30, 2012	TT Fusion	
Midway Arcade Origins	PlayStation 3	November 6, 2012	Backbone Entertainment	
Midway Arcade Origins	Xbox 360	November 6, 2012	Backbone Entertainment	
Lego The Lord of the Rings	Microsoft Windows	November 13, 2012	Traveller's Tales	
Lego The Lord of the Rings	PlayStation 3	November 13, 2012	Traveller's Tales	
Lego The Lord of the Rings	Wii	November 13, 2012	Traveller's Tales	
Lego The Lord of the Rings	Xbox 360	November 13, 2012	Traveller's Tales	
Scribblenauts Unlimited	Nintendo 3DS	November 13, 2012	5th Cell	
Batman: Arkham City	Wii U	November 18, 2012	Rocksteady Studios / WB Games Montréal	
Game Party Champions	Wii U	November 18, 2012	Phosphor Games	
Scribblenauts Unlimited	Wii U	November 18, 2012	5th Cell	
Scribblenauts Unlimited	Microsoft Windows	November 20, 2012	5th Cell	
Guardians of Middle-earth	PlayStation 3	December 4, 2012	Monolith Productions	
Guardians of Middle-earth	Xbox 360	December 4, 2012	Monolith Productions	
The Lord of the Rings Online: Shadows of Angmar	Mac	December 6, 2012	Turbine	
Batman: Arkham City	Mac	December 13, 2012	Rocksteady Studios / Feral Interactive	
Lego Legends of Chima: Speedorz	iOS	January 3, 2013	Traveller's Tales	
Lego The Lord of the Rings	Mac	February 21, 2013	Traveller's Tales / Feral Interactive	
The Wizard of Oz	iOS	March 15, 2013	Spooky Cool Labs	
Injustice: Gods Among Us	iOS	April 4, 2013	NetherRealm Studios	
Injustice: Gods Among Us	PlayStation 3	April 16, 2013	NetherRealm Studios	
Injustice: Gods Among Us	Wii U	April 16, 2013	NetherRealm Studios	
Injustice: Gods Among Us	Xbox 360	April 16, 2013	NetherRealm Studios	
Lego Batman 2: DC Super Heroes	iOS	April 26, 2013	Traveller's Tales	
Heads Up!	iOS	May 2, 2013	Impending	
Cartoon Universe	Web browser	May 6, 2013	WB Games Montréal	
Lego Batman 2: DC Super Heroes	Wii U	May 21, 2013	Traveller's Tales	
Man of Steel	Android	June 14, 2013	Phosphor Games	
Man of Steel	iOS	June 14, 2013	Phosphor Games	
Batman: Arkham City Lockdown	Android	June 18, 2013	NetherRealm Studios	
Lego Legends of Chima: Speedorz	Android	June 19, 2013	Traveller's Tales	
Scribblenauts Remix	Android	June 19, 2013	5th Cell / Iron Galaxy Studios	
Lego Legends of Chima: Laval's Journey	Nintendo 3DS	June 25, 2013	Traveller's Tales	
Lego Legends of Chima: Laval's Journey	PlayStation Vita	June 25, 2013	Traveller's Tales	
Mortal Kombat	Microsoft Windows	July 3, 2013	NetherRealm Studios / High Voltage Software	
Pacific Rim: The Mobile Game	Android	July 11, 2013	Reliance Games / Behaviour Interactive	
Pacific Rim: The Mobile Game	iOS	July 11, 2013	Reliance Games / Behaviour Interactive	
Guardians of Middle-earth	Microsoft Windows	August 29, 2013	Monolith Productions / Zombie Studios	
Lego Legends of Chima: Laval's Journey	Nintendo DS	September 3, 2013	TT Fusion	
Hot Wheels World's Best Driver	Microsoft Windows	September 17, 2013	Firebrand Games	
Hot Wheels World's Best Driver	Nintendo 3DS	September 17, 2013	Firebrand Games	
Hot Wheels World's Best Driver	PlayStation 3	September 17, 2013	Firebrand Games	
Hot Wheels World's Best Driver	Wii U	September 17, 2013	Firebrand Games	
Hot Wheels World's Best Driver	Xbox 360	September 17, 2013	Firebrand Games	
The Lord of the Rings: War in the North	Mac	September 18, 2013	Snowblind Studios / Feral Interactive	
Scribblenauts Unmasked: A DC Comics Adventure	Microsoft Windows	September 24, 2013	5th Cell	
Scribblenauts Unmasked: A DC Comics Adventure	Nintendo 3DS	September 24, 2013	5th Cell	
Scribblenauts Unmasked: A DC Comics Adventure	Wii U	September 24, 2013	5th Cell	
AdvenChewers	iOS	October 15, 2013	Sarbakan	
Batman: Arkham Origins	iOS	October 17, 2013	NetherRealm Studios	
Lego Marvel Super Heroes	Microsoft Windows	October 22, 2013	Traveller's Tales	
Lego Marvel Super Heroes	PlayStation 3	October 22, 2013	Traveller's Tales	
Lego Marvel Super Heroes	Wii U	October 22, 2013	Traveller's Tales	
Lego Marvel Super Heroes	Xbox 360	October 22, 2013	Traveller's Tales	
Lego Marvel Super Heroes: Universe in Peril	Nintendo 3DS	October 22, 2013	TT Fusion	
Lego Marvel Super Heroes: Universe in Peril	PlayStation Vita	October 22, 2013	TT Fusion	
Batman: Arkham Origins	Microsoft Windows	October 25, 2013	WB Games Montréal	
Batman: Arkham Origins	PlayStation 3	October 25, 2013	WB Games Montréal	
Batman: Arkham Origins	Wii U	October 25, 2013	WB Games Montréal	
Batman: Arkham Origins	Xbox 360	October 25, 2013	WB Games Montréal	
Batman: Arkham Origins Blackgate	Nintendo 3DS	October 25, 2013	Armature Studio	
Batman: Arkham Origins Blackgate	PlayStation Vita	October 25, 2013	Armature Studio	
Lego The Lord of the Rings	iOS	November 7, 2013	Traveller's Tales	
Injustice: Gods Among Us	Microsoft Windows	November 12, 2013	NetherRealm Studios / High Voltage Software	
Injustice: Gods Among Us	PlayStation 4	November 12, 2013	NetherRealm Studios / High Voltage Software	
Injustice: Gods Among Us	PlayStation Vita	November 12, 2013	NetherRealm Studios / Armature Studio	
Lego Friends	Nintendo 3DS	November 12, 2013	Hellbent Games	
DC Universe Online	PlayStation 4	November 15, 2013	Sony Online Entertainment	
Lego Marvel Super Heroes	PlayStation 4	November 15, 2013	Traveller's Tales	
Lego Marvel Super Heroes: Universe in Peril	Nintendo DS	November 19, 2013	TT Fusion	
Injustice: Gods Among Us	Android	November 21, 2013	NetherRealm Studios	
Lego Marvel Super Heroes	Xbox One	November 22, 2013	Traveller's Tales	
Lego Star Wars: The Complete Saga	iOS	December 12, 2013	Traveller's Tales	
Lego Star Wars: Microfighters	iOS	January 30, 2014	Traveller's Tales	
The Lego Movie Videogame	Microsoft Windows	February 7, 2014	TT Fusion	
The Lego Movie Videogame	Nintendo 3DS	February 7, 2014	TT Fusion	
The Lego Movie Videogame	PlayStation 3	February 7, 2014	TT Fusion	
The Lego Movie Videogame	PlayStation 4	February 7, 2014	TT Fusion	
The Lego Movie Videogame	PlayStation Vita	February 7, 2014	TT Fusion	
The Lego Movie Videogame	Wii U	February 7, 2014	TT Fusion	
The Lego Movie Videogame	Xbox 360	February 7, 2014	TT Fusion	
The Lego Movie Videogame	Xbox One	February 7, 2014	TT Fusion	
Lego Legends of Chima Online	iOS	February 27, 2014	WB Games Montréal	
Lego Legends of Chima Online	Web browser	February 27, 2014	WB Games Montréal	
Batman: Arkham Origins Blackgate	Microsoft Windows	April 1, 2014	Armature Studio	
Batman: Arkham Origins Blackgate	PlayStation 3	April 1, 2014	Armature Studio	
Batman: Arkham Origins Blackgate	Wii U	April 1, 2014	Armature Studio	
Batman: Arkham Origins Blackgate	Xbox 360	April 1, 2014	Armature Studio	
Lego The Hobbit	Mac	April 8, 2014	Traveller's Tales	
Lego The Hobbit	Microsoft Windows	April 8, 2014	Traveller's Tales	
Lego The Hobbit	Nintendo 3DS	April 8, 2014	Traveller's Tales	
Lego The Hobbit	PlayStation 3	April 8, 2014	Traveller's Tales	
Lego The Hobbit	PlayStation 4	April 8, 2014	Traveller's Tales	
Lego The Hobbit	PlayStation Vita	April 8, 2014	Traveller's Tales	
Lego The Hobbit	Xbox 360	April 8, 2014	Traveller's Tales	
Lego The Hobbit	Xbox One	April 8, 2014	Traveller's Tales	
Lego Star Wars: Microfighters	Android	April 17, 2014	Traveller's Tales	
Lego Friends	Nintendo DS	April 22, 2014	Hellbent Games	
Lego The Hobbit	Wii U	April 22, 2014	Traveller's Tales	
Lego Marvel Super Heroes	Mac	May 8, 2014	Traveller's Tales / Feral Interactive	
Lego Marvel Super Heroes: Universe in Peril	iOS	June 20, 2014	TT Fusion	
Scooby Doo! & Looney Tunes Cartoon Universe: Adventure	Nintendo 3DS	July 8, 2014	WayForward	
Scooby Doo! & Looney Tunes Cartoon Universe: Adventure	Microsoft Windows	July 16, 2014	WayForward	
Batman: Arkham Origins	Android	July 25, 2014	NetherRealm Studios / Phosphor Games	
Lego Ninjago: Nindroids	Nintendo 3DS	July 29, 2014	Hellbent Games	
Lego Ninjago: Nindroids	PlayStation Vita	July 29, 2014	Hellbent Games	
Lego Friends	iOS	July 31, 2014	Hellbent Games	
Scooby Doo! & Looney Tunes Cartoon Universe: Adventure	iOS	August 6, 2014	WayForward	
Gauntlet	Microsoft Windows	September 23, 2014	Arrowhead Game Studios	
Middle-earth: Shadow of Mordor	Microsoft Windows	September 30, 2014	Monolith Productions	
Middle-earth: Shadow of Mordor	PlayStation 4	September 30, 2014	Monolith Productions	
Middle-earth: Shadow of Mordor	Xbox One	September 30, 2014	Monolith Productions	
The Lego Movie Videogame	Mac	October 16, 2014	TT Fusion / Feral Interactive	
Doodle Jump DC Super Heroes	iOS	November 6, 2014	Lima Sky	
Lego Batman 3: Beyond Gotham	Microsoft Windows	November 11, 2014	Traveller's Tales	
Lego Batman 3: Beyond Gotham	Nintendo 3DS	November 11, 2014	Traveller's Tales	
Lego Batman 3: Beyond Gotham	PlayStation 3	November 11, 2014	Traveller's Tales	
Lego Batman 3: Beyond Gotham	PlayStation 4	November 11, 2014	Traveller's Tales	
Lego Batman 3: Beyond Gotham	PlayStation Vita	November 11, 2014	Traveller's Tales	
Lego Batman 3: Beyond Gotham	Wii U	November 11, 2014	Traveller's Tales	
Lego Batman 3: Beyond Gotham	Xbox 360	November 11, 2014	Traveller's Tales	
Lego Batman 3: Beyond Gotham	Xbox One	November 11, 2014	Traveller's Tales	
Middle-earth: Shadow of Mordor	PlayStation 3	November 18, 2014	Monolith Productions / Behaviour Interactive	
Middle-earth: Shadow of Mordor	Xbox 360	November 18, 2014	Monolith Productions / Behaviour Interactive	
Lego Batman 3: Beyond Gotham	Mac	November 28, 2014	Traveller's Tales / Feral Interactive	
Lego Star Wars: The Complete Saga	Android	January 1, 2015	Traveller's Tales	
WWE Immortals	Android	January 15, 2015	NetherRealm Studios / Phosphor Games	
WWE Immortals	iOS	January 15, 2015	NetherRealm Studios / Phosphor Games	
The Lego Movie Videogame	iOS	January 22, 2015	TT Fusion	
Dying Light	Linux	January 27, 2015	Techland	
Dying Light	Microsoft Windows	January 27, 2015	Techland	
Dying Light	PlayStation 4	January 27, 2015	Techland	
Dying Light	Xbox One	January 27, 2015	Techland	
Lego Chima: Tribe Fighters	iOS	February 11, 2015	Traveller's Tales	
Lego Chima: Tribe Fighters	Android	March 4, 2015	Traveller's Tales	
Lego Marvel Super Heroes: Universe in Peril	Android	March 12, 2015	TT Fusion	
Lego Ninjago: Shadow of Ronin	Nintendo 3DS	March 24, 2015	TT Fusion	
Lego Ninjago: Shadow of Ronin	PlayStation Vita	March 24, 2015	TT Fusion	
Infinite Crisis	Microsoft Windows	March 26, 2015	Turbine	
My Friend Scooby-Doo!	Android	April 2, 2015	Genera Games	
My Friend Scooby-Doo!	iOS	April 2, 2015	Genera Games	
Mortal Kombat X	iOS	April 9, 2015	NetherRealm Studios	
Mortal Kombat X	Microsoft Windows	April 14, 2015	NetherRealm Studios	
Mortal Kombat X	PlayStation 4	April 14, 2015	NetherRealm Studios	
Mortal Kombat X	Xbox One	April 14, 2015	NetherRealm Studios	
Mortal Kombat X	Android	April 23, 2015	NetherRealm Studios	
Lego Jurassic World	Microsoft Windows	June 12, 2015	TT Fusion	
Lego Jurassic World	Nintendo 3DS	June 12, 2015	TT Fusion	
Lego Jurassic World	PlayStation 3	June 12, 2015	TT Fusion	
Lego Jurassic World	PlayStation 4	June 12, 2015	TT Fusion	
Lego Jurassic World	PlayStation Vita	June 12, 2015	TT Fusion	
Lego Jurassic World	Wii U	June 12, 2015	TT Fusion	
Lego Jurassic World	Xbox 360	June 12, 2015	TT Fusion	
Lego Jurassic World	Xbox One	June 12, 2015	TT Fusion	
Batman: Arkham Knight	Microsoft Windows	June 23, 2015	Rocksteady Studios	
Batman: Arkham Knight	PlayStation 4	June 23, 2015	Rocksteady Studios	
Batman: Arkham Knight	Xbox One	June 23, 2015	Rocksteady Studios	
Lego Jurassic World	Mac	June 23, 2015	TT Fusion / Feral Interactive	
Lego Batman 3: Beyond Gotham	iOS	June 25, 2015	Traveller's Tales	
Middle-earth: Shadow of Mordor	Mac	July 30, 2015	Monolith Productions / Feral Interactive	
Middle-earth: Shadow of Mordor	Linux	July 30, 2015	Monolith Productions / Feral Interactive	
Gauntlet	PlayStation 4	August 11, 2015	Arrowhead Game Studios	
Lego Batman 3: Beyond Gotham	Android	August 12, 2015	Traveller's Tales	
Mad Max	Linux	September 1, 2015	Avalanche Studios	
Mad Max	Microsoft Windows	September 1, 2015	Avalanche Studios	
Mad Max	PlayStation 4	September 1, 2015	Avalanche Studios	
Mad Max	Xbox One	September 1, 2015	Avalanche Studios	
Lego Dimensions	PlayStation 3	September 27, 2015	Traveller's Tales	
Lego Dimensions	PlayStation 4	September 27, 2015	Traveller's Tales	
Lego Dimensions	Wii U	September 27, 2015	Traveller's Tales	
Lego Dimensions	Xbox 360	September 27, 2015	Traveller's Tales	
Lego Dimensions	Xbox One	September 27, 2015	Traveller's Tales	
Lego Ninjago: Shadow of Ronin	iOS	November 5, 2015	TT Fusion	
Lego Ninjago: Shadow of Ronin	Android	December 3, 2015	TT Fusion	
Scribblenauts Unlimited	Android	December 17, 2015	5th Cell	
Scribblenauts Unlimited	iOS	December 17, 2015	5th Cell	
Lego Marvel's Avengers	Microsoft Windows	January 26, 2016	Traveller's Tales	
Lego Marvel's Avengers	Nintendo 3DS	January 26, 2016	Traveller's Tales	
Lego Marvel's Avengers	PlayStation 3	January 26, 2016	Traveller's Tales	
Lego Marvel's Avengers	PlayStation 4	January 26, 2016	Traveller's Tales	
Lego Marvel's Avengers	PlayStation Vita	January 26, 2016	Traveller's Tales	
Lego Marvel's Avengers	Wii U	January 26, 2016	Traveller's Tales	
Lego Marvel's Avengers	Xbox 360	January 26, 2016	Traveller's Tales	
Lego Marvel's Avengers	Xbox One	January 26, 2016	Traveller's Tales	
Lego Jurassic World	Android	March 31, 2016	TT Fusion	
Lego Jurassic World	iOS	March 31, 2016	TT Fusion	
DC Universe Online	Xbox One	April 29, 2016	Daybreak Game Company	
The Lego Movie Videogame	Android	May 3, 2016	TT Fusion	
Lego Star Wars: The Force Awakens	iOS	June 28, 2016	TT Fusion	
Lego Star Wars: The Force Awakens	Microsoft Windows	June 28, 2016	TT Fusion	
Lego Star Wars: The Force Awakens	Nintendo 3DS	June 28, 2016	TT Fusion	
Lego Star Wars: The Force Awakens	PlayStation 3	June 28, 2016	TT Fusion	
Lego Star Wars: The Force Awakens	PlayStation 4	June 28, 2016	TT Fusion	
Lego Star Wars: The Force Awakens	PlayStation Vita	June 28, 2016	TT Fusion	
Lego Star Wars: The Force Awakens	Wii U	June 28, 2016	TT Fusion	
Lego Star Wars: The Force Awakens	Xbox 360	June 28, 2016	TT Fusion	
Lego Star Wars: The Force Awakens	Xbox One	June 28, 2016	TT Fusion	
Lego Star Wars: The Force Awakens	Mac	June 30, 2016	TT Fusion / Feral Interactive	
Batman: Arkham Underworld	iOS	July 14, 2016	Turbine	
Lego Star Wars: The Force Awakens	Android	July 28, 2016	TT Fusion	
Extra Slot Stars	Android	September 29, 2016	Open Wager	
Extra Slot Stars	iOS	September 29, 2016	Open Wager	
Batman: Arkham VR	PlayStation 4	October 13, 2016	Rocksteady Studios	
Batman: Arkham Asylum	PlayStation 4	October 18, 2016	Rocksteady Studios / Virtuos	
Batman: Arkham Asylum	Xbox One	October 18, 2016	Rocksteady Studios / Virtuos	
Batman: Arkham City	PlayStation 4	October 18, 2016	Rocksteady Studios / Virtuos	
Batman: Arkham City	Xbox One	October 18, 2016	Rocksteady Studios / Virtuos	
Lego Harry Potter: Years 1–4	PlayStation 4	October 18, 2016	Traveller's Tales	
Lego Harry Potter: Years 5–7	PlayStation 4	October 18, 2016	Traveller's Tales	
DC Legends	Android	November 3, 2016	WB Games San Francisco	
DC Legends	iOS	November 3, 2016	WB Games San Francisco	
Fantastic Beasts: Cases from the Wizarding World	Android	November 17, 2016	Mediatonic / WB Games San Francisco	
Fantastic Beasts: Cases from the Wizarding World	iOS	November 17, 2016	Mediatonic / WB Games San Francisco	
Batman: Arkham Underworld	Android	February 15, 2017	Turbine	
Lego Worlds	Microsoft Windows	March 7, 2017	Traveller's Tales	
Lego Worlds	PlayStation 4	March 7, 2017	Traveller's Tales	
Lego Worlds	Xbox One	March 7, 2017	Traveller's Tales	
Lego City Undercover	Microsoft Windows	April 4, 2017	TT Fusion	
Lego City Undercover	Nintendo Switch	April 4, 2017	TT Fusion	
Lego City Undercover	PlayStation 4	April 4, 2017	TT Fusion	
Lego City Undercover	Xbox One	April 4, 2017	TT Fusion	
Batman: Arkham VR	Microsoft Windows	April 25, 2017	Rocksteady Studios	
Injustice 2	Android	May 11, 2017	NetherRealm Studios	
Injustice 2	iOS	May 11, 2017	NetherRealm Studios	
Injustice 2	PlayStation 4	May 16, 2017	NetherRealm Studios	
Injustice 2	Xbox One	May 16, 2017	NetherRealm Studios	
Cars 3: Driven to Win	Nintendo Switch	June 13, 2017	Avalanche Software	
Cars 3: Driven to Win	PlayStation 3	June 13, 2017	Avalanche Software	
Cars 3: Driven to Win	PlayStation 4	June 13, 2017	Avalanche Software	
Cars 3: Driven to Win	Wii U	June 13, 2017	Avalanche Software	
Cars 3: Driven to Win	Xbox 360	June 13, 2017	Avalanche Software	
Cars 3: Driven to Win	Xbox One	June 13, 2017	Avalanche Software	
Lego Worlds	Nintendo Switch	September 5, 2017	Traveller's Tales	
The Lego Ninjago Movie Video Game	Microsoft Windows	September 22, 2017	TT Fusion	
The Lego Ninjago Movie Video Game	Nintendo Switch	September 22, 2017	TT Fusion	
The Lego Ninjago Movie Video Game	PlayStation 4	September 22, 2017	TT Fusion	
The Lego Ninjago Movie Video Game	Xbox One	September 22, 2017	TT Fusion	
Middle-earth: Shadow of War	Android	September 28, 2017	IUGO Mobile Entertainment	
Middle-earth: Shadow of War	iOS	September 28, 2017	IUGO Mobile Entertainment	
Middle-earth: Shadow of War	Microsoft Windows	October 10, 2017	Monolith Productions	
Middle-earth: Shadow of War	PlayStation 4	October 10, 2017	Monolith Productions	
Middle-earth: Shadow of War	Xbox One	October 10, 2017	Monolith Productions	
Game of Thrones: Conquest	Android	October 19, 2017	Turbine	
Game of Thrones: Conquest	iOS	October 19, 2017	Turbine	
Injustice 2	Microsoft Windows	November 14, 2017	NetherRealm Studios / QLOC	
Lego Marvel Super Heroes 2	Microsoft Windows	November 14, 2017	Traveller's Tales	
Lego Marvel Super Heroes 2	Nintendo Switch	November 14, 2017	Traveller's Tales	
Lego Marvel Super Heroes 2	PlayStation 4	November 14, 2017	Traveller's Tales	
Lego Marvel Super Heroes 2	Xbox One	November 14, 2017	Traveller's Tales	
Scribblenauts Showdown	Nintendo Switch	March 6, 2018	Shiver Entertainment	
Scribblenauts Showdown	PlayStation 4	March 6, 2018	Shiver Entertainment	
Scribblenauts Showdown	Xbox One	March 6, 2018	Shiver Entertainment	
Harry Potter: Hogwarts Mystery	Android	April 25, 2018	Jam City	
Harry Potter: Hogwarts Mystery	iOS	April 25, 2018	Jam City	
Lego The Incredibles	Microsoft Windows	June 15, 2018	TT Fusion	
Lego The Incredibles	Nintendo Switch	June 15, 2018	TT Fusion	
Lego The Incredibles	PlayStation 4	June 15, 2018	TT Fusion	
Lego The Incredibles	Xbox One	June 15, 2018	TT Fusion	
Westworld	Android	June 21, 2018	Behaviour Interactive	
Westworld	iOS	June 21, 2018	Behaviour Interactive	
Lego DC Super-Villains	Microsoft Windows	October 16, 2018	Traveller's Tales	
Lego DC Super-Villains	Nintendo Switch	October 16, 2018	Traveller's Tales	
Lego DC Super-Villains	PlayStation 4	October 16, 2018	Traveller's Tales	
Lego DC Super-Villains	Xbox One	October 16, 2018	Traveller's Tales	
Lego Harry Potter: Years 1–4	Nintendo Switch	October 30, 2018	Traveller's Tales	
Lego Harry Potter: Years 1–4	Xbox One	October 30, 2018	Traveller's Tales	
Lego Harry Potter: Years 5–7	Nintendo Switch	October 30, 2018	Traveller's Tales	
Lego Harry Potter: Years 5–7	Xbox One	October 30, 2018	Traveller's Tales	
Hitman 2	Microsoft Windows	November 13, 2018	IO Interactive	
Hitman 2	PlayStation 4	November 13, 2018	IO Interactive	
Hitman 2	Xbox One	November 13, 2018	IO Interactive	
Hitman: Absolution	PlayStation 4	January 11, 2019	IO Interactive	
Hitman: Absolution	Xbox One	January 11, 2019	IO Interactive	
Hitman: Blood Money	PlayStation 4	January 11, 2019	IO Interactive	
Hitman: Blood Money	Xbox One	January 11, 2019	IO Interactive	
The Lego Movie 2 Videogame	Microsoft Windows	February 26, 2019	Traveller's Tales	
The Lego Movie 2 Videogame	Nintendo Switch	February 26, 2019	Traveller's Tales	
The Lego Movie 2 Videogame	PlayStation 4	February 26, 2019	Traveller's Tales	
The Lego Movie 2 Videogame	Xbox One	February 26, 2019	Traveller's Tales	
Mortal Kombat 11	Microsoft Windows	April 23, 2019	NetherRealm Studios	
Mortal Kombat 11	Nintendo Switch	April 23, 2019	NetherRealm Studios	
Mortal Kombat 11	PlayStation 4	April 23, 2019	NetherRealm Studios	
Mortal Kombat 11	Xbox One	April 23, 2019	NetherRealm Studios	
Harry Potter: Wizards Unite	Android	June 21, 2019	Niantic / WB Games San Francisco	
Harry Potter: Wizards Unite	iOS	June 21, 2019	Niantic / WB Games San Francisco	
Lego Jurassic World	Nintendo Switch	September 17, 2019	TT Fusion	
Bakugan: Champions of Vestroia	Nintendo Switch	November 3, 2020	WayForward	
Lego Star Wars Battles	iOS	September 24, 2021	TT Odyssey	
Back 4 Blood	Microsoft Windows	October 12, 2021	Turtle Rock Studios	
Back 4 Blood	PlayStation 4	October 12, 2021	Turtle Rock Studios	
Back 4 Blood	PlayStation 5	October 12, 2021	Turtle Rock Studios	
Back 4 Blood	Xbox One	October 12, 2021	Turtle Rock Studios	
Back 4 Blood	Xbox Series X/S	October 12, 2021	Turtle Rock Studios	
Lego Star Wars: The Skywalker Saga	Microsoft Windows	April 5, 2022	Traveller's Tales	
Lego Star Wars: The Skywalker Saga	Nintendo Switch	April 5, 2022	Traveller's Tales	
Lego Star Wars: The Skywalker Saga	PlayStation 4	April 5, 2022	Traveller's Tales	
Lego Star Wars: The Skywalker Saga	PlayStation 5	April 5, 2022	Traveller's Tales	
Lego Star Wars: The Skywalker Saga	Xbox One	April 5, 2022	Traveller's Tales	
Lego Star Wars: The Skywalker Saga	Xbox Series X/S	April 5, 2022	Traveller's Tales	
Gotham Knights	Microsoft Windows	October 25, 2022	WB Games Montréal	
Gotham Knights	PlayStation 5	October 25, 2022	WB Games Montréal	
Gotham Knights	Xbox Series X/S	October 25, 2022	WB Games Montréal	
Hogwarts Legacy	Microsoft Windows	February 10, 2023	Avalanche Software	
Hogwarts Legacy	PlayStation 5	February 10, 2023	Avalanche Software	
Hogwarts Legacy	Xbox Series X/S	February 10, 2023	Avalanche Software	
Hogwarts Legacy	PlayStation 4	May 5, 2023	Avalanche Software	
Hogwarts Legacy	Xbox One	May 5, 2023	Avalanche Software	
Harry Potter: Magic Awakened	Android	June 27, 2023	NetEase	
Harry Potter: Magic Awakened	iOS	June 27, 2023	NetEase	
Mortal Kombat 1	Microsoft Windows	September 19, 2023	NetherRealm Studios	
Mortal Kombat 1	Nintendo Switch	September 19, 2023	NetherRealm Studios	
Mortal Kombat 1	PlayStation 5	September 19, 2023	NetherRealm Studios	
Mortal Kombat 1	Xbox Series X/S	September 19, 2023	NetherRealm Studios	
Mortal Kombat: Onslaught	Android	October 17, 2023	NetherRealm Studios	
Mortal Kombat: Onslaught	iOS	October 17, 2023	NetherRealm Studios	
Hogwarts Legacy	Nintendo Switch	November 14, 2023	Avalanche Software	
Batman: Arkham Asylum	Nintendo Switch	December 1, 2023	Rocksteady Studios / Turn Me Up Games	
Batman: Arkham City	Nintendo Switch	December 1, 2023	Rocksteady Studios / Turn Me Up Games	
Batman: Arkham Knight	Nintendo Switch	December 1, 2023	Rocksteady Studios / Turn Me Up Games	
Suicide Squad: Kill the Justice League	Microsoft Windows	February 2, 2024	Rocksteady Studios	
Suicide Squad: Kill the Justice League	PlayStation 5	February 2, 2024	Rocksteady Studios	
Suicide Squad: Kill the Justice League	Xbox Series X/S	February 2, 2024	Rocksteady Studios	
MultiVersus	Microsoft Windows	May 28, 2024	Player First Games	
MultiVersus	PlayStation 4	May 28, 2024	Player First Games	
MultiVersus	PlayStation 5	May 28, 2024	Player First Games	
MultiVersus	Xbox One	May 28, 2024	Player First Games	
MultiVersus	Xbox Series X/S	May 28, 2024	Player First Games	
Harry Potter: Quidditch Champions	Microsoft Windows	September 3, 2024	Unbroken Studios	
Harry Potter: Quidditch Champions	PlayStation 4	September 3, 2024	Unbroken Studios	
Harry Potter: Quidditch Champions	PlayStation 5	September 3, 2024	Unbroken Studios	
Harry Potter: Quidditch Champions	Xbox One	September 3, 2024	Unbroken Studios	
Harry Potter: Quidditch Champions	Xbox Series X/S	September 3, 2024	Unbroken Studios	
Lego Harry Potter: Years 1–4	PlayStation 5	October 8, 2024	Traveller's Tales	
Lego Harry Potter: Years 1–4	Xbox Series X/S	October 8, 2024	Traveller's Tales	
Lego Harry Potter: Years 5–7	PlayStation 5	October 8, 2024	Traveller's Tales	
Lego Harry Potter: Years 5–7	Xbox Series X/S	October 8, 2024	Traveller's Tales	
Batman: Arkham Shadow	Meta Quest 3	October 22, 2024	Camouflaj	
Harry Potter: Quidditch Champions	Nintendo Switch	November 8, 2024	Unbroken Studios	
Hogwarts Legacy	Nintendo Switch 2	June 5, 2025	Avalanche Software	
DC Worlds Collide	Android	July 7, 2025	WB Games San Francisco	
DC Worlds Collide	iOS	July 7, 2025	WB Games San Francisco	
Lego Batman: Legacy of the Dark Knight	Microsoft Windows	May 22, 2026	Traveller's Tales	
Lego Batman: Legacy of the Dark Knight	PlayStation 5	May 22, 2026	Traveller's Tales	
Lego Batman: Legacy of the Dark Knight	Xbox Series X/S	May 22, 2026	Traveller's Tales	
Game of Thrones: Dragonfire	Android	June 2, 2026	WB Games Boston	
Game of Thrones: Dragonfire	iOS	June 2, 2026	WB Games Boston	
Lego Batman: Legacy of the Dark Knight	Nintendo Switch 2	September 18, 2026	Traveller's Tales	

== See also ==
- List of Looney Tunes video games
  - List of Tiny Toon Adventures video games
  - List of Animaniacs video games
- List of video games based on DC Comics
  - List of Batman video games
  - List of Superman video games
- List of Lego video games
- List of Hanna-Barbera-based video games
  - List of Scooby-Doo video games
- List of Tom and Jerry video games
- Harry Potter video games
- Middle-earth in video games
- List of Cartoon Network video games
  - Adult Swim Games
- List of video games by Midway Games
  - List of Mortal Kombat games
- List of Atari, Inc. games
- Sesame Street video games
