= List of Lego video games =

Logo used for Lego video games

Since 1995, numerous commercial video games based on Lego, the construction system produced by The Lego Group, have been released. Following the second game, Lego Island, developed and published by Mindscape, The Lego Group published games on its own with its Lego Media division, which was renamed Lego Software in 2000, and Lego Interactive in 2002. The division also co-published with Electronic Arts before closing. Former Lego Interactive staff founded company Giant Interactive Entertainment for future Lego game publishing. Following the release of Lego Star Wars: The Video Game, Giant merged with Traveller's Tales to form TT Games. TT Games was acquired by Warner Bros. Games (WBG) in November 2007, making WBG the primary publisher for Lego games.

== List of games ==
| Year | Title | Platform(s) | | | | Ref(s) |
| Year | Title | PC | Console | Handheld | Mobile | Ref(s) |
|---|---|---|---|---|---|---|
| 1995 | Lego Fun to Build | — | Sega Pico | — | — | |
| 1997 | Lego Island | Microsoft Windows | — | — | — | |
| 1998 | Lego Chess | Microsoft Windows | — | — | — | |
| 1998 | Lego Creator | Microsoft Windows | — | — | — | |
| 1998 | Lego Loco | Microsoft Windows | — | — | — | |
| 1999 | Lego Friends | Microsoft Windows | — | — | — | |
| 1999 | Lego Racers | Microsoft Windows | Nintendo 64, PlayStation | Game Boy Color | — | — |
| 1999 | Lego Rock Raiders | Microsoft Windows | PlayStation | — | — | |
| 2000 | Legoland | Microsoft Windows | — | — | — | |
| 2000 | Lego Alpha Team | Microsoft Windows | — | Game Boy Color | — | — |
| 2000 | Lego Creator: Knights' Kingdom | Microsoft Windows | — | — | — | |
| 2000 | Lego My Style: Preschool (Note: The Lego My Style games are also titled Lego My World in certain regions. In Japan the Preschool game was released on PlayStation in 2002 under the title Kids Station: Lego no Sekai.) | Mac OS, Microsoft Windows | PlayStation | — | — | |
| 2000 | Lego My Style: Kindergarten | Mac OS, Microsoft Windows | — | — | — | |
| 2000 | Lego Stunt Rally | Microsoft Windows | — | Game Boy Color | — | |
| 2001 | Lego Bionicle: Quest for the Toa | — | — | Game Boy Advance | — | — |
| 2001 | Lego Creator: Harry Potter | Microsoft Windows | — | — | — | |
| 2001 | Lego Island 2: The Brickster's Revenge | Microsoft Windows | PlayStation | Game Boy Advance, Game Boy Color | — | — |
| 2001 | Lego Racers 2 | Microsoft Windows | PlayStation 2 | Game Boy Advance | — | |
| 2002 | Bionicle: Matoran Adventures | — | — | Game Boy Advance | — | — |
| 2002 | Creator: Harry Potter and the Chamber of Secrets | Microsoft Windows | — | — | — | |
| 2002 | Drome Racers | Microsoft Windows | GameCube, PlayStation 2 | Game Boy Advance | — | — |
| 2002 | Football Mania | Microsoft Windows | PlayStation 2 | Game Boy Advance | — | |
| 2002 | Galidor: Defenders of the Outer Dimension | Microsoft Windows | — | Game Boy Advance | — | — |
| 2002 | Island Xtreme Stunts | Microsoft Windows | PlayStation 2 | Game Boy Advance | — | — |
| 2003 | Bionicle | macOS, Microsoft Windows | GameCube, PlayStation 2, Xbox | Game Boy Advance | — | |
| 2004 | Lego Knights' Kingdom | — | — | Game Boy Advance | — | — |
| 2005 | Bionicle: Maze of Shadows | — | — | Game Boy Advance | — | — |
| 2005 | Lego Star Wars: The Video Game | macOS, Microsoft Windows | GameCube, PlayStation 2, Xbox | Game Boy Advance | J2ME | |
| 2006 | Bionicle Heroes | Microsoft Windows | GameCube, PlayStation 2, Wii, Xbox 360 | Game Boy Advance, Nintendo DS | J2ME | |
| 2006 | Lego Bricks | — | — | — | J2ME | |
| 2006 | Lego Bricktopia | Microsoft Windows | — | — | — | |
| 2006 | Lego Builder Bots | Microsoft Windows | — | — | — | |
| 2006 | Lego Chic Boutique | Microsoft Windows | — | — | — | |
| 2006 | Lego Fever | Microsoft Windows | — | — | — | |
| 2006 | Lego Star Wars II: The Original Trilogy | macOS, Microsoft Windows | GameCube, PlayStation 2, Xbox, Xbox 360 | Game Boy Advance, Nintendo DS, PlayStation Portable | J2ME | |
| 2006 | Lego World Soccer | — | — | — | J2ME | |
| 2007 | Bionicle Challenge | — | — | — | J2ME | |
| 2007 | Lego Brick Breaker | — | — | — | J2ME | |
| 2007 | Lego Escape | — | — | — | J2ME | |
| 2007 | Lego Racers | — | — | — | J2ME | |
| 2007 | Lego Star Wars: The Complete Saga | macOS, Microsoft Windows | PlayStation 3, Wii, Xbox 360 | Nintendo DS | Android, iOS | |
| 2008 | Bionicle Defenders | — | — | — | J2ME | |
| 2008 | Lego Batman: The Videogame | macOS, Microsoft Windows | PlayStation 2, PlayStation 3, Wii, Xbox 360 | Nintendo DS, PlayStation Portable | J2ME | |
| 2008 | Lego Indiana Jones: The Original Adventures | macOS, Microsoft Windows | PlayStation 2, PlayStation 3, Wii, Xbox 360 | Nintendo DS, PlayStation Portable | J2ME | |
| 2009 | Lego Battles | — | — | Nintendo DS | — | |
| 2009 | Lego Indiana Jones 2: The Adventure Continues | macOS, Microsoft Windows | PlayStation 3, Wii, Xbox 360 | Nintendo DS, PlayStation Portable | — | |
| 2009 | Lego Rock Band | — | PlayStation 3, Wii, Xbox 360 | Nintendo DS | — | |
| 2010 | Lego Harry Potter: Years 1–4 | macOS, Microsoft Windows | PlayStation 3, Wii, Xbox 360 | Nintendo DS, PlayStation Portable | Android, iOS | |
| 2010 | Lego Universe | macOS, Microsoft Windows | — | — | — | |
| 2011 | Lego Battles: Ninjago | — | — | Nintendo DS | — | |
| 2011 | Lego Duplo Minispiele 2 | — | — | — | Android, iOS | — |
| 2011 | Lego Harry Potter: Years 5–7 | macOS, Microsoft Windows | PlayStation 3, Wii, Xbox 360 | Nintendo 3DS, Nintendo DS, PlayStation Portable, PlayStation Vita | Android, iOS | |
| 2011 | Lego Pirates of the Caribbean: The Video Game | macOS, Microsoft Windows | PlayStation 3, Wii, Xbox 360 | Nintendo 3DS, Nintendo DS, PlayStation Portable | — | |
| 2011 | Lego Star Wars III: The Clone Wars | macOS, Microsoft Windows | PlayStation 3, Wii, Xbox 360 | Nintendo 3DS, Nintendo DS, PlayStation Portable | — | |
| 2011 | Life of George | — | — | — | Android, iOS | |
| 2012 | Lego Batman 2: DC Super Heroes | macOS, Microsoft Windows | PlayStation 3, Wii, Wii U, Xbox 360 | Nintendo 3DS, Nintendo DS, PlayStation Vita | Android, iOS | |
| 2012 | Lego Friends Dress Up | — | — | — | Android, iOS | — |
| 2012 | Lego City Team Up | — | — | — | Android, iOS | — |
| 2012 | Lego Duplo Zoo | — | — | — | Android, iOS | — |
| 2012 | Lego Juniors Create & Cruise | — | — | — | Android, iOS | |
| 2012 | Lego The Lord of the Rings | macOS, Microsoft Windows | PlayStation 3, Wii, Xbox 360 | Nintendo 3DS, Nintendo DS, PlayStation Vita | Android, iOS | |
| 2012 | Lego Monster Fighters Race | — | — | — | iOS | — |
| 2012 | Lego Ninjago: Rise of the Snakes | — | — | — | iOS | — |
| 2013 | Lego City Undercover | Microsoft Windows | Wii U, PlayStation 4, Xbox One, Nintendo Switch | — | — | |
| 2013 | Lego City Undercover: The Chase Begins | — | — | Nintendo 3DS | — | |
| 2013 | Lego Friends | — | — | Nintendo 3DS, Nintendo DS | Android, iOS | |
| 2013 | Lego Galaxy Squad Bug Battle | — | — | — | iOS | |
| 2013 | Lego Hero Factory Brain Attack | — | — | — | Android, iOS | — |
| 2013 | Lego Legends of Chima Online | Microsoft Windows | — | — | iOS | — |
| 2013 | Lego Legends of Chima: Laval's Journey | — | — | Nintendo 3DS, Nintendo DS, PlayStation Vita | — | — |
| 2013 | Lego Legends of Chima: Speedorz | — | — | — | Android, iOS | — |
| 2013 | Lego Marvel Super Heroes | macOS, Microsoft Windows | Nintendo Switch, PlayStation 3, PlayStation 4, Wii U, Xbox 360, Xbox One | — | — | |
| 2014 | Lego Batman 3: Beyond Gotham | macOS, Microsoft Windows | PlayStation 3, PlayStation 4, Wii U, Xbox 360, Xbox One | Nintendo 3DS, PlayStation Vita | Android, iOS | |
| 2014 | Lego City My City | — | — | — | Android, iOS | |
| 2014 | Lego Fusion Town Master | — | — | — | Android, iOS | — |
| 2014 | Lego Fusion Battle Towers | — | — | — | Android, iOS | — |
| 2014 | Lego Fusion Create & Race | — | — | — | Android, iOS | — |
| 2014 | Lego Fusion Resort Designer | — | — | — | Android, iOS | — |
| 2014 | Lego The Hobbit | macOS, Microsoft Windows | PlayStation 3, PlayStation 4, Wii U, Xbox 360, Xbox One | Nintendo 3DS, PlayStation Vita | — | |
| 2014 | Lego Marvel Super Heroes: Universe in Peril (Note: Lego Marvel Super Heroes: Universe in Peril is the handheld/mobile version of Lego Marvel Super Heroes.) | — | — | Nintendo 3DS, Nintendo DS, PlayStation Vita | Android, iOS | |
| 2014 | Lego Minifigures Online | Linux, macOS, Microsoft Windows | — | — | Android, iOS | |
| 2014 | The Lego Movie Videogame | macOS, Microsoft Windows | PlayStation 3, PlayStation 4, Wii U, Xbox 360, Xbox One | Nintendo 3DS, PlayStation Vita | Android, iOS | |
| 2014 | Lego Ninjago: Nindroids | — | — | Nintendo 3DS, PlayStation Vita | — | — |
| 2014 | Lego Star Wars: Microfighters | — | — | — | Android, iOS | — |
| 2015 | Bionicle: Mask of Creation | — | — | — | Android, iOS | |
| 2015 | Lego Dimensions | — | PlayStation 3, PlayStation 4, Wii U, Xbox 360, Xbox One | — | — | |
| 2015 | Lego Jurassic World | macOS, Microsoft Windows | Nintendo Switch, PlayStation 3, PlayStation 4, Wii U, Xbox 360, Xbox One | Nintendo 3DS, PlayStation Vita | Android, iOS | |
| 2015 | Lego Legends of Chima: Tribe Fighters | — | — | — | Android, iOS | — |
| 2015 | Lego Nexo Knights: Merlok 2.0 | — | — | — | Android, iOS | |
| 2015 | Lego Ninjago: Shadow of Ronin | — | — | Nintendo 3DS, PlayStation Vita | Android, iOS | — |
| 2016 | Bionicle: Mask of Control | — | — | — | Android, iOS | |
| 2016 | Lego City My City 2 | — | — | — | Android, iOS | |
| 2016 | Lego Harry Potter Collection | Microsoft Windows | Nintendo Switch, Nintendo Switch 2, PlayStation 4, PlayStation 5, Xbox One, Xbox Series X/S | — | — | |
| 2016 | Lego Marvel's Avengers | macOS, Microsoft Windows | PlayStation 3, PlayStation 4, Wii U, Xbox 360, Xbox One | Nintendo 3DS, PlayStation Vita | — | |
| 2016 | Lego Star Wars: The Force Awakens | macOS, Microsoft Windows | PlayStation 3, PlayStation 4, Wii U, Xbox 360, Xbox One | Nintendo 3DS, PlayStation Vita | Android, iOS | |
| 2017 | The Lego Batman Movie Game | — | — | — | Android, iOS | |
| 2017 | Lego Marvel Super Heroes 2 | macOS, Microsoft Windows | Nintendo Switch, PlayStation 4, Xbox One | — | — | |
| 2017 | The Lego Ninjago Movie Video Game | Microsoft Windows | Nintendo Switch, PlayStation 4, Xbox One | — | — | |
| 2017 | Lego Quest & Collect | — | — | — | Android, iOS | |
| 2017 | Lego Worlds | Microsoft Windows | Nintendo Switch, PlayStation 4, Xbox One | — | — | — |
| 2018 | Lego Cube | Microsoft Windows | — | — | Android, iOS | |
| 2018 | Lego DC Super-Villains | macOS, Microsoft Windows | Nintendo Switch, PlayStation 4, Xbox One | — | — | |
| 2018 | Lego The Incredibles | macOS, Microsoft Windows | Nintendo Switch, PlayStation 4, Xbox One | — | — | |
| 2019 | Lego Brawls | macOS (Apple Arcade), Microsoft Windows | Nintendo Switch, PlayStation 4, PlayStation 5, Xbox One, Xbox Series X/S | — | iOS (Apple Arcade) | |
| 2019 | Lego Builder's Journey | macOS (Apple Arcade), Microsoft Windows | Nintendo Switch, PlayStation 4, PlayStation 5, Xbox One, Xbox Series X/S | — | iOS (Apple Arcade) | |
| 2019 | Lego Marvel Collection | macOS, Microsoft Windows | PlayStation 4, Xbox One | — | — | |
| 2019 | The Lego Movie 2 Videogame | macOS, Microsoft Windows | Nintendo Switch, PlayStation 4, Xbox One | — | — | |
| 2019 | Lego Star Wars Battles | macOS (Apple Arcade) | — | — | Android, iOS (Apple Arcade) | |
| 2019 | Lego Tower | — | — | — | Android, iOS | |
| 2020 | Lego Legacy: Heroes Unboxed | Microsoft Windows | — | — | Android, iOS | |
| 2021 | Lego Star Wars: Castaways | macOS (Apple Arcade) | — | — | iOS (Apple Arcade) | |
| 2022 | Lego Bricktales | Microsoft Windows | Nintendo Switch, PlayStation 4, PlayStation 5, Xbox One, Xbox Series X/S | — | Android, iOS | |
| 2022 | Lego Star Wars: The Skywalker Saga | Microsoft Windows | Nintendo Switch, PlayStation 4, PlayStation 5, Xbox One, Xbox Series X/S | — | — | |
| 2023 | Lego 2K Drive | Microsoft Windows | Nintendo Switch, PlayStation 4, PlayStation 5, Xbox One, Xbox Series X/S | — | — | |
| 2023 | Lego Fortnite | Microsoft Windows | Nintendo Switch, PlayStation 4, PlayStation 5, Xbox One, Xbox Series X/S | — | Android, iOS | |
| 2024 | Lego Hill Climb Adventures | — | — | — | Android, iOS | |
| 2024 | Lego Horizon Adventures | Microsoft Windows | Nintendo Switch, PlayStation 5 | — | — | |
| 2025 | Lego Party | Microsoft Windows | Nintendo Switch, Nintendo Switch 2, PlayStation 4, PlayStation 5, Xbox One, Xbox Series X/S | — | — | — |
| 2025 | Lego Voyagers | Microsoft Windows | Nintendo Switch, Nintendo Switch 2, PlayStation 4, PlayStation 5, Xbox Series X/S | — | — | — |
| 2026 | Lego Batman: Legacy of the Dark Knight | Microsoft Windows | Nintendo Switch 2, PlayStation 5, Xbox Series X/S | — | — | |
