= Lego Friends (2013 video game) =

2013 video game

- Developers: Hellbent Games; TT Games
- Publisher: Warner Bros. Interactive Entertainment
- Director: Christopher Mair
- Designers: Kenny Chu; Zoe Flower
- Programmer: Roger Milne
- Composer: Chris Rezanson
- Platforms: Nintendo 3DS; Nintendo DS; iOS; Android
- Release: Nintendo 3DS: NA: 12 November 2013; EU: 29 November 2013; Nintendo DS: NA: 8 April 2014; EU: 11 April 2014; iOS: WW: 31 July 2014
- Genre: Social simulation
- Mode: Single-player

Lego Friends is a 2013 Lego-themed social simulation game developed by TT Games and Hellbent Games and published by Warner Bros. Interactive Entertainment. In it, the player assists the residents of Heartlake City by completing different activities, developing their friendship with other characters and unlocking items as a result. The game is based on the Lego toy line of the same name. Lego Friends was criticized for its repetitive gameplay, loading times, and underutilization of minigames, but was complimented for its accessibility.

== Gameplay ==
Lego Friends, based on the Lego toy line of the same name, is different from that of previous Lego video games. Combat is omitted in favor of exploration and social simulation elements. In the game, the female player character visits her cousin Olivia over the summer at Heartlake City. Olivia, her friends, and the other citizens give the player different tasks to complete in the city, made up of five main areas. Some of these tasks require the player to assume control of their pets and make use of their special abilities. Completing these tasks unlocks new clothing, pets, and accessories for the player. Completing tasks also increases the "friendship level" with Olivia and her friends, with whom reaching "true friendship" is the main objective of the game. Lego studs serve as currency, which can be earned through playing minigames.

== Development and release ==
Lego Friends was announced on 14 May 2013 through a press release. The game was developed by TT Games in partnership with Canadian studio Hellbent Games, previously responsible for the Lego Battles and Lego Battles: Ninjago games on the Nintendo DS, and was published by Warner Bros. Interactive Entertainment. It was released for the Nintendo 3DS on 12 November 2013 in North America and 29 November 2013 in Europe, for the Nintendo DS on 8 April 2014 in North America and 11 April 2014 in Europe, and for iOS on 31 July 2014. An Android version was also released.

== Reception ==
Reception

Review scores
Publication	Score
Nintendo Life	2/10
Financial Post	8/10
Nintendojo	0/10

Nintendo Life criticized Lego Friends for its repetitive gameplay, controls, frame rate, and loading times. However, they noted that the voice acting was "generally satisfactory" and described the visuals as "colourful and sweet". Financial Post spoke more positively of the game. Though acknowledging its simplicity, they believed Lego Friends' gameplay offered more diversity than other titles for young girls, and complimented the game's accessibility. Conversely, Nintendojo panned the game for its repetition and loading times, and remarked that there were better family-friendly titles on the 3DS for girls. Nintendo Life and Nintendojo also expressed disappointment with the small role minigames played, feeling that they were easy but offered variety.
