= Lego Legends of Chima =

LEGO theme

- Sub‑themes: Accessory sets, Contraction, Fire vs. Ice, Legend Beasts, Outlands, Speedorz and Tribe Packs
- Subject: Anthropomorphic animals, Fantasy and Warrior animals
- Availability: 2013–2015
- Total sets: 136
- TV series: Legends of Chima
- Official website

Lego Legends of Chima (pronounced /ˈtʃiːmə/ CHEE-mə) is a discontinued Lego theme that was introduced in 2013 and discontinued in 2015. The product line was based on the storyline of Legends of Chima, a 3D animated television series, which was produced to coincide with the Lego theme. The storyline was set in the fictional realm of "Chima", a fantasy world inhabited by various warring tribes of anthropomorphic animals that battle to collect a substance called "Chi". Alongside the television series and several shorts based on Lego Legends of Chima, the theme also produced a range of associated media, including theme park attractions, video games, and publications.

== Overview ==
The product line focused on Chima, a fantasy world inhabited by eight warrior tribes of animals that battle for an energy source called "Chi". The toy line was driven by the storyline of the animated television series Legends of Chima, which follows two former childhood friends, Laval from the Lion tribe and Cragger from the Crocodile tribe, who become bitter enemies. The two main characters lead the battle among the eight tribes, which threatens the once-peaceful land of Chima.

== Development ==
Lego Legends of Chima was developed to appeal to children and was designed to replace the Lego Ninjago theme, but was phased out to introduce other children's themes such as Nexo Knights. By contrast, Lego Ninjago continued production for over ten years.

Legends of Chima was developed as a franchise to promote the Chima universe with the aim of launching across multiple platforms, consisting of the television series, online content, construction sets and video games.

In December 2014, Lego designer Samuel Thomas Johnson explained that the product line and the television series were closely aligned from the start and that the vehicles in the show were designed to match the models. He commented, "I'm lucky to have a talented guy on my team who has been drawing Lego models for years so I can give him a model and say 'can you do me some concept art for that?' and he'll have it done in an hour."... "We have a model, take tons of photos and videos, then do concept art; that's our starting point. It helps because trying to explain how bat wings are supposed to work in text doesn't make sense at all." He elaborated further on the creative process for the toy line by stating, "We make functions and try to fit them in with animals and what animals do. If a vehicle doesn't have the traits of the animal it is meant to resemble, it doesn't make a lot of sense."

In 2021, The co-creator of Lego Ninjago Tommy Andreasen revealed the unseen concept art for the Legends of Chima on Twitter, detailing what the theme could have been had it taken a different path. Tommy Andreasen explained, "This is a concept film was made to explain Legends of Chima's ending internally. The search for the Fire Wings was intended to be a six-episode arc which would also have introduced Florax, Flinx's mother, chief botanist of Chima, but plans were revised."

== Launch ==
Legends of Chima launched on 26 December 2012. The Chima franchise aimed to follow in the success of the Lego Ninjago theme. Soren Torp Laursen, President of Lego Systems commented, "Building upon our success with developing rich and immersive original storylines, most notable the recent Ninjago phenomenon, we're excited to launch a whole new world in Lego Legends of Chima to spark any child's imagination and invite them to the world of Lego building."

The playsets were released from January 2013 and included a larger range of products than previous themes. The product range included construction toy sets, racing vehicles and a board game. The toy line also offered a battle play function that was similar to the Lego Ninjago spinner toys, which involved placing Lego minifigures on a spinning base. The vehicles included a Speedorz range, which were vehicles built from Lego bricks and powered by a ripcord to provide children with a racing challenge. Legends of Chima was created as a big-bang project that aimed to drive growth in the Lego toy line. In December 2012, a Lego spokesman predicted that Legends of Chima would top sales of Ninjago by as much as 30%.

To promote the Legends of Chima product line, four windows of Hamley's in Regent Street, London were taken over by a window display from Boxing Day 2012 to 8 February 2013. The window display featured two 2.9-metre models of Chima's two main characters, Laval the Lion and Cragger the Crocodile, and a 3D recreation of Mount Cavora.

In 2013, a Lego Chima Challenge roadshow toured the UK to engage children in the Chima product range. The roadshow launched at Chessington World of Adventures on 1 April 2013 and ran for seven months until October 2013. The challenge involved thousands of children competing to the top of a leaderboard using Lego Chima Speedorz. The top 14 children were invited to a finale at Chessington World of Adventures where they competed to become the UK Lego Chima champion. Senior Brand Manager, Sally-Anne Weekes stated, "Animals are a universally popular theme and something that we haven't had in the Lego portfolio for several years. Legends of Chima fills this gap and where better to showcase it than with the tribes' real-life counterparts?"

== Legends of Chima TV series ==
The Legends of Chima product line was based on the storyline of its accompanying animated television series that made its debut in 2013. It was produced by M2Film in Denmark and launched on Cartoon Network. Legends of Chima is set in a fantasy world that is inhabited by eight warring tribes of anthropomorphic animals. The associated Lego construction toys were launched to coincide with the U.S. premiere of the series in July 2013.

== Construction sets ==
According to BrickLink, The Lego Group released 136 playsets and promotional polybags as part of the Lego Legends of Chima theme. The product line was eventually discontinued by 2015. The toy sets were designed to resemble their associated animal tribes, such as incorporating gold colour and physical lion features into the vehicles and buildings related to the Lion tribe.

In February 2013, the Lego Chima product line included Chima Starter sets, a range of action sets that included Ring of Fire and Boulder Bowling and construction sets, such as the Razcal Glider, Eris Eagle Interceptor and Cragger's Command Ship. In March 2013, the theme released the Ice Tower, Nest Dive and Jungle Gates action sets, which included a Lego minifigure, a Speedorz, two Chi weapons, five cards, six Chi crystals, and an orb-holding obstacle. The 2013 summer release included Skunk Attack, Eglor's Twin Bike, Gorzan's Gorilla Striker and The Lion Chi Temple set, which included seven minifigures. The product range also included constructible action figures that resembled the Lego Hero Factory product line.

In 2014, Lego Legends of Chima released two waves of playsets to coincide with the second and third seasons of the Legends of Chima television series that aired in March and August 2014. The first wave focused on Legend Beasts construction sets featuring one minifigure from the Lion, Eagle, Crocodile, Gorilla and Wolf tribes. Several Speedorz sets were released in March 2014, including Web Dash, a Speedorz with six legs. A second wave released in the summer of 2014 focused on themes of fire and ice and the introduction of the Scorpion tribe. The second wave included Vardy's Ice Vulture Glider, Sir Fangar's Saber-Tooth Walker, Laval's Fire Lion, Maula's Ice Mammoth Stomper and Flying Phoenix Fire Temple, a set that converted from a building to a flying vehicle.

== Web shorts ==
The product line was accompanied by a series of animated short films that was released on YouTube.

#	Title	Release date	Notes
1	A Crash Course In Flying	June 4, 2013	Lego Legends of Chima web series
2	Tale of the Tribe Stone	June 4, 2013	Lego Legends of Chima web series
3	Like Father Like Son	June 4, 2013	Lego Legends of Chima web series
4	Speed Dating	June 4, 2013	Lego Legends of Chima web series
5	Razar King of Profit	June 14, 2013	Lego Legends of Chima web series
6	Plovar the Destroyer	June 14, 2013	Lego Legends of Chima web series
7	Air Head Flight Test	October 24, 2013	Lego Legends of Chima web series
8	Lennox the Brave	June 20, 2013	Lego Legends of Chima web series
9	Vibe and the Mellow Head Dude	June 20, 2013	Lego Legends of Chima web series
10	Crocodile Evolution	June 20, 2013	Lego Legends of Chima web series
11	Hy-Bear Active	October 21, 2014	Lego Legends of Chima web series
12	Animal Instinct	October 21, 2014	Lego Legends of Chima web series
13	Eris vs Black Cloud	April 23, 2014	Lego Legends of Chima web series
14	A Force of Nature	October 21, 2014	Lego Legends of Chima web series
15	Outlandish Tale	October 21, 2014	Lego Legends of Chima web series
16	The Cloud and the Shadow	March 5, 2014	Lego Legends of Chima web series
17	The Rumble in the Jungle	October 21, 2014	Lego Legends of Chima web series
18	The ShadoWind Chronicles	March 5, 2014	Lego Legends of Chima web series
19	20 Royal Getaway	March 5, 2014	Lego Legends of Chima web series
20	A Plovar Makeover	March 5, 2014	Lego Legends of Chima web series
21	The Black Valious	March 6, 2014	Lego Legends of Chima web series
22	The Eggs Terminator	March 6, 2014	Lego Legends of Chima web series
23	The Flyin' Lion	March 6, 2014	Lego Legends of Chima web series
24	The Web and the Sting	August 13, 2014	Lego Legends of Chima web series
25	Haunted Lair	May 27, 2014	Lego Legends of Chima web series
26	Game of Legends	May 27, 2014	Lego Legends of Chima web series
27	Horn to be Wild	August 13, 2014	Lego Legends of Chima web series
28	Unfinished Business	May 27, 2014	Lego Legends of Chima web series
29	Whatever Happened to the Wind Shadow	August 13, 2014	Lego Legends of Chima web series
30	Dream Dreamless	May 27, 2014	Lego Legends of Chima web series
31	Big Boys Big Toys	August 13, 2014	Lego Legends of Chima web series
32	Completely Ridiculous Tale	May 27, 2014	Lego Legends of Chima web series
33	The Panther	May 30, 2015	Lego Legends of Chima web series
34	Nap time is Over!	May 30, 2015	Lego Legends of Chima web series
35	The Good News Bear	July 15, 2015	Lego Legends of Chima web series
36	The 9th Phoenix	May 30, 2015	Lego Legends of Chima web series
37	Big Boys Big Toys	August 13, 2015	Lego Legends of Chima web series

== Other media ==
=== Video games ===
In 2013, three games based on Legends of Chima were released. Lego Legends of Chima: Speedorz was made available on the Lego website and for iOS on January 3, 2013. It is a racing game that involves collecting Lego studs and battling animals. Lego Legends of Chima: Laval's Journey was released on June 25, 2013, for PlayStation Vita and Nintendo 3DS and released on August 31, 2013, for Nintendo DS. A MMORPG titled Lego Legends of Chima Online was released on PC and MAC browsers by WB Games Montreal. The game involved building an outpost, venturing across the land of Chima to complete quests and customising weapons. It was released in the third quarter of 2013 and shut down on June 1, 2015. Chima is also one of several themes featured in the 2015 Lego Dimensions game, which included Laval, Eris, and Cragger as playable characters.

A mobile game titled LEGO Chima: Tribe Fighters was developed by Warner Bros. Interactive Entertainment for iOS and released on 12 February 2015.

=== Attractions ===
In March 2013, Legoland Florida announced the introduction of a themed area of the park based on Legends of Chima. The expansion included an interactive water ride called Quest for CHI, Speedorz Arena and a 4D film titled The LEGO Chima 4D Movie Xperience. On 27 March 2019, it was replaced by a themed area named Lego Movie World.

On 24 May 2014, Legoland California launched the Legends of Chima Water Park, which featured several themed attractions including, Lion Temple Wave Pool, Cragger's Swamp water play area, Eglor's Build-A-Boat, Rhino Beach and Speedorz Arena. The water park also featured a 40-foot tall "floating" Mt. Cavora in the Lion Temple Wave Pool.

=== Publications ===
In 2013, a monthly magazine aimed at children aged 7–11 was launched and published by Immediate Media. The first issue was published on 6 November 2013.

A Legends of Chima Character Encyclopedia was published by Dorling Kindersley, which provides facts about the history, characters, tribes, vehicles and weapons in the theme.

== Reception ==
In 2013, The Lego Group reported that Lego City, Lego Duplo, Lego Technic, Lego Creator, Lego Friends and Lego Legends of Chima had contributed to an increase in sales in 2013 by 11 percent, and stated, "Lego Legends of Chima is a rich and engaging universe that children can explore in many ways. Not only by building and playing with Lego sets, but also in the digital world using apps, exploring content on LEGO.com, via videos and online games. The theme is a great example of how we bridge physical and digital play."

On 25 November 2013, Business Insider listed the Lion Chi Temple as one of the "9 Hot Toys That Every Kid Wants This Year", describing it as, "one of the more extravagant locations in the show and toys in the series."

== Awards and nominations ==
In 2014, Lego Legends of Chima was awarded "Toy of the Year" and also "Boy Toy of the Year" by the Toy Association.

== See also ==
- Lego Ninjago
- Nexo Knights
- Bionicle
- The Lego Movie (Lego theme)
- Lego Monkie Kid
- Lego Dreamzzz
