= Guinness World Records (disambiguation) =

Guinness World Records is an annual book first published in 1954.

Guinness World Records may also refer to:

- Guinness World Records Gamer's Edition, book first published in 2008 listing video gaming world records
- Guinness World Records: The Video Game, video game based on the book, published in November 2008
- Guinness World Records Primetime, TV show aired from July 1998 to October 2001
- Guinness World Records (TV series), TV show aired from March 2011
- Guinness World Records – Ab India Todega, Indian reality TV show
