= Lego Fusion Town Master =

2014 video game

- Developer: TT Games
- Series: Lego Fusion
- Platforms: iOS; Android
- Release: August 2014
- Genre: City-building

Lego Fusion Town Master is a 2014 mobile video game based off the Lego Fusion product line. The game incorporates augmented reality connected to the Town Master set. With the retirement of both the set and product line, the app was discontinued in July 2016.

Three other video games were released with the sets: Battle Towers, Create & Race, and Resort Designer.

== Gameplay ==
The player plays as a mayor with the objective of building an entire town. Facades built in the physical Lego set contain an augmented reality tag which is scanned to place the specific building in the game. The player also fulfills the needs of the town's residents, such as adding new businesses they suggest. As the town grows, minigames could also be unlocked. Users also had the ability to visit towns created by other players.

== Reception ==
Will Greenwald of PCMag reviewed both the set and game, rating it 3.5/5 stars. They stated that while "not quite as much fun as simply building [Lego]", the game was still "fun in its own right". Toys "R" Us expected the set to be among their most popular items in 2014.
