= Paul Gouge =

Paul Gouge is a games industry entrepreneur and investor, the founder of BattleMail, Rockpool Games, Ironstone Partners, Ideas Pad and Playdemic.

== Career ==
=== BattleMail ===
After receiving a degree in economics, Gouge spent two years in investment banking before leaving in 1999 to found his first games company, BattleMail, with Alex Rigby. Their game, BattleMail Kung Fu, was a virally distributed casual massively multiplayer online game that was nominated, unsuccessfully, for a BAFTA award and was later sold to (M)Forma.

=== Rockpool Games/Ironstone Partners ===
In late 2002, Gouge and Rigby founded Rockpool Games, a mobile phone games studio, as well as Ironstone Partners, a video game licensing business. Over the following five years, Rockpool developed mobile games based on major video game licenses and won several major awards. Both businesses were acquired by Eidos Interactive in early 2007 for $15m, with Gouge as head of Eidos Play, the firm's casual division, until February 2009.

=== Playdemic ===
In late 2010, Gouge and Rigby founded Playdemic, a European independent social games company that develops and operates game services for social networks and mobile devices. The company’s first release, Gourmet Ranch, was launched in August 2010 and, by early 2012, had registered over 10 million users and generated over $10m in virtual goods revenue.

Playdemic's second release was Crossword Buddies, which was launched on Facebook in February 2012 and became available on iPhone and iPad in May 2012. On 8 March 2012, Playdemic signed a distribution deal with Zynga to help increase its audience.

=== Appatyze ===
Gouge was a seed investor in and board advisor to Appatyze, an in-app advertising company.
