= Spy Hunter (2012 video game) =

- Developer: TT Fusion
- Publisher: Warner Bros. Interactive Entertainment
- Series: Spy Hunter
- Platforms: PlayStation Vita; Nintendo 3DS
- Release: PlayStation Vita: NA: 9 October 2012; AU: 10 October 2012; EU: 12 October 2012; Nintendo 3DS: NA: 9 October 2012; AU: 7 November 2012; EU: 8 November 2012
- Genre: Vehicular combat
- Modes: Single-player, multiplayer

Spy Hunter is a 2012 vehicular combat racing game developed by TT Fusion, published by Warner Bros. Interactive Entertainment, and released for the PlayStation Vita and Nintendo 3DS. The game was the second reboot of the Spy Hunter series, following the first reboot of the franchise in 2001.

== Reception ==
Reception

Aggregate score
Aggregator	Score	
Aggregator	3DS	PS Vita
Metacritic	52/100	51/100

Review scores
Publication	Score	
Publication	3DS	PS Vita
Famitsu	28/40	28/40
Nintendo World Report	5.5/10	N/A
PlayStation Official Magazine – Australia	N/A	5/10
PlayStation: The Official Magazine	N/A	7/10
Common Sense Media	3/5	3/5
The Digital Fix	N/A	5/10

The game received "mixed" reviews on both platforms according to the review aggregation website Metacritic. In Japan, Famitsu gave it a score of all four sevens for a total of 28 out of 40.
