= Lego Legends of Chima: Speedorz =

- Developers: TT Games; 4T2
- Platforms: Browser iOS
- Release: January 2, 2013 (browser); January 3, 2013 (iOS)
- Genre: Racing

Lego Legends of Chima: Speedorz is a 2013 racing video game based off the Lego Legends of Chima franchise. It was released as a browser game on the Lego website and on iOS devices the next day.

== Gameplay ==
The player customizes a character, and then races with bikes across the Chima world while collecting coins, which can then be used to buy new vehicles.

== Reception ==
The video game website Vandal gave the game a mostly positive review, calling it "a free, entertaining, and quite complete application." 148Apps rated the game 3/5 stars, calling it a "promising racer that needs a little more content". Modojo rated the game 2.5/5, but spoke positively of the concept.
