= Lego Dimensions =

2015 video game

- PlayStation 4 Starter Pack box art
- Developer: Traveller's Tales
- Publisher: Warner Bros. Interactive Entertainment
- Directors: Jon Burton; James McLoughlin
- Producers: Anna Bailey; Toby Jennings
- Designers: Jon Burton; Dewi Roberts
- Programmers: Steve Harding; Chris Stanforth; Alistair Crowe; Ben Klages
- Artists: Jeremy Pardon; Leon Warren; Paul Munro
- Writers: Jon Burton; Graham Goring; James McLoughlin
- Composers: Rob Westwood; Ian Livingstone
- Series: Lego
- Platforms: PlayStation 3; PlayStation 4; Xbox One; Xbox 360; Wii U
- Release: NA: 27 September 2015; AU: 28 September 2015; EU: 29 September 2015
- Genre: Action-adventure
- Modes: Single-player, multiplayer

Lego Dimensions is a 2015 toys-to-life action-adventure game developed by Traveller's Tales and published by Warner Bros. Interactive Entertainment for the PlayStation 3, PlayStation 4, Xbox 360, Xbox One and Wii U. It is a crossover between Lego and over thirty different franchises, from which levels can be played through a USB toy pad peripheral. The Starter Pack, containing the game, the USB toy pad, three minifigures and one vehicle, was released in September 2015, while additional level packs and characters were released over the following two years, with a planned third year of content being cancelled in October 2017.

== Gameplay ==
Lego Dimensions features the same style of gameplay as the previous Lego video games developed by Traveller's Tales, in which up to two players control Lego minifigures based on various represented franchises. Players progress through linear levels, using their characters' abilities to solve puzzles, defeat enemies, collect collectibles such as Minikits, Characters in Peril, and Gold Bricks, and attempt to reach the level's end. Collecting in-game currency known as Studs fills a gauge called the Rule Breaker Gauge, and completely filling the gauge unlocks a Gold Brick. Characters are entered into the game by placing their respective minifigures onto a USB toy pad, with each character possessing unique abilities that can be used to solve puzzles or reach hidden areas. Using a character from a certain franchise will also unlock that franchise's Adventure World, an open-world area for players to explore and complete in-game objectives. Some sections of the game require players to move their characters to different spots on the toy pad.

The Starter Pack includes the toy pad and the game's fourteen-level main story campaign, which revolves around Batman, Gandalf, and Wyldstyle, while additional levels are made available by purchasing Level Packs and Story Packs. In addition to the minifigures, players can also build models of vehicles, such as the Batmobile, TARDIS, Mystery Machine, or DeLorean, and put them into the game for characters to drive. Completing objectives in the levels and adventure worlds will reward players with Gold Bricks, which can be used to upgrade vehicles and give them new abilities. Each adventure world also contains a Red Brick for players to retrieve; these unlock special bonuses, such as visual modifiers for characters or extra assistance at finding collectible items. Unlike series such as Skylanders and Disney Infinity, the minifigures, vehicles and the USB toy pad are all made from real Lego pieces and can be freely built and customized.

All minifigures and vehicles can be used in any available level, though specific figures must be present to initially enter those levels or worlds. An additional feature called "Hire a Hero" was added shortly after the game's launch; this feature allows players to spend the Studs they have earned in a level to temporarily summon characters they do not own to complete an otherwise-inaccessible puzzle. However, this does not count for vehicles or objects, such as the TARDIS, and the Studs paid act as a penalty towards the player's Rule Breaker gauge. The game's second year of content also introduced competitive multiplayer in the form of the Battle Arenas, allowing up to four players to compete in modes such as Capture the Flag. Gold Bricks can be used to purchase new power-ups for the Battle Arenas. Certain packs also include exclusive features; for example, the Midway Games level pack unlocks playable emulations of over twenty of the company's arcade titles, while the Teen Titans Go! packs unlock an exclusive Lego-themed episode of the series that can be viewed in-game.

=== Packs ===
In addition to the game's starter pack, Lego Dimensions has a wide range of packs available, split into four categories: Level Packs, Team Packs, Fun Packs and Story Packs. Packs from the game's second year (September 2016–17) also unlock Adventure World Battle Arenas, competitive four-person multiplayer areas themed after each figure's respective franchise.

Level Packs typically include a new character and two items, referred to as Vehicles and Gadgets depending on their type, as well as an exclusive level themed around the property the character originates from. Team Packs include two characters and items, while Fun Packs include a single character and item. Story Packs add six new levels to the game based on the represented franchise; these levels retell the story of their respective basis, with characters from other franchises making occasional appearances. The packs also include one or two characters, a vehicle or gadget and a new gateway design for the Toy Pad.

=== Franchises ===
The game features characters and worlds from thirty different franchises, consisting of:

==== Year 1 ====
- DC Comics
- The Lord of the Rings
- The Lego Movie
- The Wizard of Oz
- The Simpsons
- Lego Ninjago
- Doctor Who
- Back to the Future
- Portal 2
- Ghostbusters
- Midway Games (represented by its arcade-based titles)
- Scooby-Doo
- Jurassic World
- Lego Legends of Chima

==== Year 2 ====
- Ghostbusters (2016)
- Adventure Time
- Mission: Impossible
- Harry Potter
- The A-Team
- Fantastic Beasts and Where to Find Them
- Sonic the Hedgehog
- Gremlins
- E.T. the Extra-Terrestrial
- The Lego Batman Movie
- Knight Rider
- The Goonies
- Lego City Undercover
- Teen Titans Go!
- The Powerpuff Girls
- Beetlejuice

The game additionally features character and setting cameos from other franchises, including HAL 9000 from the Space Odyssey series, S.T.A.R. Labs from The CW's The Flash, Bedrock from The Flintstones, the family room from The Jetsons and the DNA ship from Red Dwarf. Unlike other toys-to-life series such as Skylanders and Disney Infinity, Lego Dimensions allows all figures to be compatible with the existing title, rather than releasing a sequel.

== Plot ==
Lord Vortech, a shapeshifting and dimension-travelling entity, and his robotic servant X-PO arrive on Foundation Prime, a planet at the center of the Lego multiverse. They seek the twelve Foundation Elements, the cornerstones of time and space, to merge all dimensions into one under Vortech's governance. These elements, such as the ruby slippers, the One Ring and a piece of kryptonite, were scattered across the multiverse long ago; when recovered, they will release the Foundation of All Dimensions, a force that grants control over the multiverse. As X-PO doubts Vortech's ambition, Vortech decides that he no longer needs him and banishes him to the interdimensional void Vorton, disregarding the risk of harnessing the elements. Vortech's body cannot handle further dimensional jumps, forcing him to open rifts to other dimensions and recruit their villains to his cause while taking heroes pulled through them hostage. This damages the boundaries between the multiverse, causing some of its aspects and inhabitants to be displaced.

When Robin, Frodo Baggins and MetalBeard are abducted, each unknowingly in possession of three of the elements, Batman, Gandalf, and Wyldstyle pursue them and arrive at Vorton, where they rebuild the destroyed rift generator. Aided by X-PO, the heroes use the generator to travel through dimensions in search of the Foundation Elements and the five missing Keystones that power the generator, hoping to find their missing friends and foil Vortech's plot. Aided by "Keystone Devices" that allow them to use the Keystones' powers, they aid and battle some of the multiverse's respective heroes and villains, while Vortech learns of X-PO's involvement. The heroes travel to Foundation Prime to confront him, but this is revealed to be a diversion that allows Vortech's minions to infiltrate Vorton and retrieve the Foundation Elements. With all of the elements gathered, the Foundation of All Dimensions is released and Vortech gains its power. He merges the heroes' friends and a piece of himself into a mutant called the Tri and unleashes it upon the trio's origin dimensions. Fearing another failure could lead to a similar fate, Vortech's henchmen flee.

The heroes free their friends from the Tri and vanquish it. Seeing that they will need all the help they can get, the group recruits several of their allies and devise a plan to defeat Vortech by imprisoning him in an endless rift, inspired by his previous attempt to dispose of the heroes. As the heroes and their allies arrive at Foundation Prime, they neutralize the Foundation and imprison Vortech in the endless rift, saving the multiverse. In a post-credits scene, an unknown figure finds the piece of Vortech, which survived the Tri's vanquishment, in the remains of Foundation Prime's palace and is corrupted by its influence. Vortech's laughter is heard, implying that the figure has been transformed into a doppelgänger of him.

Additional levels typically retell plots, such as that of Back to the Future, Ghostbusters and The Simpsons's "El Viaje Misterioso de Nuestro Jomer (The Mysterious Voyage of Homer)". There are additionally original storylines, which often tie back to the game's original story. The Portal Level Pack features Chell and Wheatley being returned to Aperture Science after saving it from the latter's sabotage (Note: As depicted in the 2011 video game Portal 2) and discovering a rift generator that GLaDOS has recreated. In the Midway Games Level Pack, a "Gamer Kid" discovers that Vortech's doppelgänger has tampered with a condemned amusement arcade's games, causing their protagonists to enter reality. The Sonic the Hedgehog Level Pack follows Sonic as he searches for his friends and the Chaos Emeralds, which were scattered across their origin dimension after an incident involving a Keystone Device that Doctor Eggman intends to use. The Doctor Who Level Pack is disconnected from the original story and follows the Doctor as he attempts to foil the Daleks' conquest of Earth.

== Development ==
Support for the game ended on 23 October 2017, with no more additional content or packs to be released, despite a three-year plan that had been devised, as well as a statement from associate producer Mark Warburton that the team had no intention of ending development after that point.

== Reception ==
Reception

Aggregate score
| Aggregator | Score |
|---|---|
| Metacritic | (PS4) 80/100 (XONE) 80/100 (Wii U) 62/100 |

Review scores
| Publication | Score |
|---|---|
| Destructoid | 7.5/10 |
| Game Informer | 8.75/10 |
| GameSpot | 8/10 |
| GamesRadar+ | 3.5/5 |
| IGN | 7.7/10 |
| Nintendo Life | 7/10 |
| Polygon | 8/10 |
| The Guardian | 4/5 |
| USgamer | 1.5/5 |

Lego Dimensions received "generally favorable reviews", according to review aggregator website Metacritic. IGN awarded it a score of 7.7 out of 10, saying "Lego Dimensions' great characters and fun references consistently left me with a big dumb grin on my face." GameSpot awarded it a score of 8.0, saying "In any game within the toys-to-life genre, there's sometimes an unspoken question: is this also a great toy or just a great game? In Lego Dimensions' case, the answer is easy: it's both." They also praised the open world sections of the game, stating that "While they don't feature the same level of intricacy the main game provides, they do add several more hours each to the overall experience." Polygon awarded it 8 out of 10, saying "Where the game's innovative designs push forward what it means to blend toys and games into a single experience, the writing and both companies' willingness to dig deep into their vaults, pull the whole game together." Good Game: Spawn Point Hosts Bajo and Hex both awarded the game 3 out of 5. Praise was given to the puzzles and mechanics, commenting that it may be their favourite Lego game. However, they gave harsh criticism to the pricing model. Their summation was that it was "poor value", stating that the last few Lego games were "pretty much as good as this one, but players can play as their extensive character rosters without having to buy expensive expansions."

=== Sales ===
In the United Kingdom and Ireland, Lego Dimensions landed at number two on the sales charts in its first week. Sales had surpassed in comparison to first week sales of other 2015 toys-to-life game competitors Skylanders: Superchargers and Disney Infinity 3.0.

=== Awards ===
List of awards and nominations
| Award | Category | Result |
|---|---|---|
| The Game Awards 2015 | Best Family Game | Nominated |
| 19th Annual D.I.C.E. Awards | Family Game of the Year | Nominated |
| British Academy Children's Awards | Game | Won |
