= Guinness World Records: The Videogame =

2008 video game

- North American Wii cover art
- Developer: TT Fusion
- Publisher: Warner Bros. Interactive Entertainment
- Platforms: iOS; Nintendo DS; Wii
- Release: Wii, Nintendo DS: EU: November 7, 2008; NA: November 11, 2008; AU: November 12, 2008; iOS: WW: June 1, 2009
- Genre: Party
- Modes: Single-player, multiplayer

Guinness World Records: The Videogame is a party video game based on the Guinness World Records series of books of world records. Developed by TT Fusion and published by Warner Bros. Interactive Entertainment, the game was released on November 7, 2008, in Europe, November 11, 2008, in North America, and November 12, 2008 in Australia. The game involves attempting to beat real-life world records through minigames. The game saw mixed to positive reviews upon release, and was considered better than most minigame compilations that were on Nintendo consoles at the time.

== Gameplay ==
Guinness World Records: The Videogame contains 36 mini-games based on real-world record attempts. The player can select 12 avatars and can travel around a globe-like map that allows them to select minigames. Beating minigames allows the player to unlock more minigames and outfits for their avatars. Minigames involve attempting to beat a world record as fast as possible, such as building the highest skyscraper in a Tetris style minigame or attempting the world's highest BMX stunt jump. The player's score is placed on a scoreboard at the end of the round and is then compared over the internet to other players' scores. The game shows trivia about real-life world records on the menu and during loading screens.

== Reception ==
Reception

Aggregate scores
Aggregator	Score
GameRankings	DS: 70.00% Wii: 67.50%
Metacritic	DS: 70/100; Wii: 67/100

Review scores
Publication	Score
Eurogamer	7/10
IGN	7/10
VideoGamer.com	8/10

Guinness World Records: The Videogame received mixed reviews from critics upon release. On Metacritic, the game holds scores of 70/100 for the Nintendo DS version based on 4 reviews, and 67/100 for the Wii version based on 12 reviews. On GameRankings, the game holds scores of 70.00% for the DS version based on 4 reviews, and 67.50% for the Wii version based on 16 reviews.

Reviewing the DS and Wii version for IGN, Mark Thomas praised the game's strange minigames, comparing it positively to WarioWare, before ending the review with, "[...] But even then there are a couple of more fully-fledged gems in this pack that are addictive enough to warrant keeping the game handy long after you've been declared the best, the tallest, the strongest and the smartest with every record there is." Writing for Nintendo World Report and reviewing both versions, Francesca DiMola found the games lack of similarity to actual World Records disappointing and the games boring, saying, "The lack of identity and direction is unfulfilling, and while a select group of mini-games are entertaining and original, many of them feel generic and bland." Writing for Eurogamer and reviewing the Wii version, Simon Parkin found the idea to be interesting, ending the review with "[...] Guinness World Records is the best mini-game collection we've played on the Wii, in part because of the content but principally because of its context."
