= Lego Harry Potter: Years 1–4 =

2010 action-adventure video game

- Developers: Traveller's Tales; TT Fusion (mobile/handheld); Double Eleven (remaster)
- Publishers: Warner Bros. Interactive Entertainment; Feral Interactive (OS X)
- Director: Jon Burton
- Producer: John O'Brien
- Composers: John Williams; Patrick Doyle
- Series: Wizarding World
- Platforms: Microsoft Windows; Nintendo DS; PlayStation 3; PlayStation Portable; Wii; Xbox 360; iOS; OS X; Android; PlayStation 4; Nintendo Switch; Xbox One; PlayStation 5; Xbox Series X/S; Nintendo Switch 2
- Release: 25 June 2010: NA: 29 June 2010; EU: 25 June 2010; AU: 25 June 2010 iOS; WW: 19 November 2010 OS X; WW: 6 January 2011 Android; WW: 28 September 2016 PlayStation 4; NA: 18 October 2016; EU: 21 October 2016 Nintendo Switch, Xbox One; NA: 30 October 2018; EU: 2 November 2018 PlayStation 5, Xbox Series X/S; WW: 8 October 2024 Nintendo Switch 2; WW: 16 October 2026
- Genre: Action-adventure
- Modes: Single-player, multiplayer

Lego Harry Potter: Years 1–4 is an action-adventure game developed by Traveller's Tales and published by Warner Bros. Interactive Entertainment. The game is based on the Lego Harry Potter toy line, and its storyline covers the first four books by J. K. Rowling and its film adaptations in the Harry Potter film series, Philosopher's Stone (2001), Chamber of Secrets (2002), Prisoner of Azkaban (2004), and Goblet of Fire (2005).

The game was released in June 2010 for Microsoft Windows, PlayStation 3, Wii, Xbox 360, Nintendo DS, and PlayStation Portable; Android in November 2010; OS X in January 2011; iOS in May 2012; PlayStation 4 in October 2016; Nintendo Switch and Xbox One in October 2018; PlayStation 5 and Xbox Series X/S in October 2024; and for Nintendo Switch 2 in October 2026 as part of the Lego Harry Potter Collection, which bundles the game with its sequel, Lego Harry Potter: Years 5–7.

== Gameplay ==
Lego Harry Potter's gameplay is similar to that of most previous Lego video games, with an emphasis on collecting, exploring, and solving puzzles. Casting spells is an integral part of the gameplay, with a wide range of spells available for unlocking as the player progresses. As there are many spells available in the game, the player can use the spell wheel to select the spell. Potion-making is another integral feature; potions can help the player complete levels.

Changes to the mechanics of previous games include 'Student in Peril' collectibles, which are a group of challenges to help a student, and Polyjuice Potion, which allows players to temporarily change one of the player's characters into any other mini-figure unlocked. A major change is to the hub system. Diagon Alley serves as a hub for purchasing unlockable extras, The Leaky Cauldron works as a hub for returning to previous levels, and Hogwarts acts as a constantly evolving massive hub with the unlockable characters found by picking up their hidden portraits.

The bigger areas in Hogwarts have led developer Traveller's Tales to improve the overall level design. Also included is another bonus feature that allows players to create their own levels, similar to Lego Indiana Jones 2: The Adventure Continues. If the player is lost in-game, they can follow a trail of Ghost Studs to the next level. These do not count towards the stud total, but will guide the player to the next section of the level. However one of the collectible 'red bricks', found in the courtyard next to Herbology, gets the player an 'extra' that makes the ghost studs worth 1,000 each. The ghost studs are also able to be picked up without cheats if playing as a ghost character.

The central hub is Diagon Alley and its entrance through the Leaky Cauldron. Players can access a room at the second floor of the building to watch cutscenes from the game, as well as using a notice board with pictures, from where the player can play completed levels again. Diagon Alley serves as a series of stores, where the player is able to buy characters or design a number of customizable ones, purchase spells, and 'red bricks' that have a varying range of uses, such as changing the player's wand to a carrot, or making the player invincible. Players are also able to visit Gringotts or Borgin and Burkes in order to play extra levels, unlocked with a specific number of Gold bricks, which are another collectible of the Game. There are 167 characters purchasable in the game.

The game covers a wide range of characters of the first four parts, from notable ones like Albus Dumbledore, and Severus Snape, to others like Viktor Krum in shark form or the Trolley Witch from the Hogwarts Express.

The storyline is substantially unaltered from the movies, with slight changes to allow consistent two-player mode throughout the game.

=== Multiplayer mode ===
The game employs the two player split-screen technique introduced in Lego Indiana Jones 2: The Adventure Continues. There is also online support for PlayStation 3 and Xbox 360. The plotline of the game differs from that of the books and films several times in order to have at least two characters in each level. For example, Hermione (accidentally) joins Harry during the first task of the Triwizard Tournament, which was unlike both the book and the film, where Harry fights the dragon alone. Another example is in the final boss fight with Voldemort. Cedric Diggory is there to help and dies when trying to escape in the last cutscene despite the fact that Cedric is killed before Voldemort's reincarnation in both the book and movie.

=== Changes for the Nintendo DS, PSP, Android and iOS versions ===
In the Nintendo DS, PSP, Android and iOS versions, several changes were made from the versions of the other formats. There is only one hub, the Room of Requirement, but the explorable Hogwarts and Diagon Alley hubs of the other versions were removed and both boss battles and spellcasting were simplified. Also, unlike all previous Traveller's Tales Lego video games, the Nintendo DS, PSP, Android and iOS versions have written sentences. In other Lego video games before 2012, the Lego figures only grunted to each other. The DS version uses touchscreen controls to perform spells, and is a downscaled port of the PSP version. The Android version of the game is not compatible with Android 10 and newer due to changes in the Android OS.

== Development ==
News of the game's existence was leaked in March 2009, although rumours had been circulating since late 2008. Warner Bros. officially confirmed the game in June 2009 with an estimated release of 2010.

A teaser trailer was released on the day of the game's official announcement followed by four individually released vignettes, beginning in December 2009. Each vignette focused on one of the first four years featured in the game. A new trailer was released to coincide with the game's launch. All six trailers are available on the official website. A demo of the game was made available to download for Windows, PlayStation Network, and Xbox Live in June 2010. The game was initially released on 25 June 2010 in Europe, 29 June 2010 in North America, and 30 June 2010 in Australia and New Zealand for Microsoft Windows, PlayStation 3, Wii, Xbox 360, Nintendo DS, and PlayStation Portable. A mobile version of the game was released for iOS on 19 November 2010 and was ported to Android on 28 September 2016. The OS X version of the game was released on 6 January 2011 by Feral Interactive. A remastered version of the game was released for the PlayStation 4 on 18 October 2016 in North America and in Europe on 21 October as part of the Lego Harry Potter Collection in which the game was bundled with its sequel, Lego Harry Potter: Years 5–7. This collection was ported to Nintendo Switch and Xbox One on 30 October 2018 in North America and on 2 November in Europe.

== Reception ==
Reception

Aggregate scores
Aggregator	Score
GameRankings	81.45%
Metacritic	iOS: 87/100; PC: 79/100; PS3: 79/100; X360: 79/100

Review scores
Publication	Score
1Up.com	B+
GameRevolution	B−
GameSpot	8/10
IGN	8.5/10
Official Nintendo Magazine	80%
VideoGamer.com	8/10

The game received generally positive reviews from critics, who praised the soundtrack, the fidelity to the material, the graphics (especially for PS3 and Xbox 360), the story and the gameplay. Video Game review aggregator website GameRankings scored the game at 81%, with media review aggregator website Metacritic scoring slightly lower at 80%. The Official Nintendo Magazine gave the Wii and Nintendo DS version 80%, saying that it was "one of the best Harry Potter games ever", however it lacked originality compared to previous Lego video games. GameSpot gave the console versions an 8/10, complimenting the "large amount of secrets and charm", and disagreed with the Nintendo Magazine, saying it was both "easily the best Harry Potter game to date", and "one of the finest Lego adventures to date".

IGN praised the game giving it an 8.5 out of 10, complimenting the new additions to the game, while the PSP version of the game received a 7.0. Greg Miller from IGN said the game had a "general sense of a great LEGO game paired with a great series really makes this game a standout." IGN editor Nicole Tanner awarded it "Best Mindless Fun", at the publisher's "favorite games of 2010 list".

During the 14th Annual Interactive Achievement Awards, the Academy of Interactive Arts & Sciences nominated Lego Harry Potter for "Family Game of the Year".

== Sequel ==
A sequel, covering the stories of the final three books and four movies in the series, Lego Harry Potter: Years 5–7, was released in 2011 by Warner Bros.
