= Lego Legends of Chima: Laval's Journey =

2013 video game

- North American Nintendo 3DS cover art
- Developer: TT Fusion
- Publisher: Warner Bros. Interactive Entertainment
- Series: Lego Legends of Chima
- Platforms: Nintendo 3DS; Nintendo DS; PlayStation Vita
- Release: Nintendo 3DS, PlayStation Vita: EU: 21 June 2013; NA: 25 June 2013; AU: 26 June 2013; Nintendo DS: NA: 31 August 2013; EU: 6 September 2013; AU: 23 September 2013
- Genre: Action-adventure
- Mode: Single-player

Lego Legends of Chima: Laval's Journey is a sandbox-style action-adventure video game developed by TT Fusion. It was released for the Nintendo 3DS and PlayStation Vita in June 2013 and for the Nintendo DS a few months later. The game is based on the Lego Legends of Chima theme which was discontinued in 2015.

== Gameplay ==
As with other Lego video games, the gameplay is platform based with characters having a unique set of skills to help them progress through the levels in different ways. While the game starts out with the player controlling Laval as the main player, more characters become playable as the game progresses. There are more than 60 playable characters in Lego Legends of Chima: Laval's Journey, with fifteen levels to battle through. Any tribe of Chima may be played, including lions, eagles, gorillas, wolves, rhinoceri, crocodiles, bears, ravens, and nomads, such as Skinnet the skunk and Furtivo the fox.

== Plot ==
The story begins at a jousting tournament, to decide which tribe will take possession of the Golden Chi orb. The final round sees Laval facing off against Cragger, who uses an elongated lance to win the duel. Laval is annoyed that Cragger keeps "cheating his way to victory". Shortly after the tournament has ended, a bright light is seen at the top of nearby Spiral Mountain. Laval ascends the mountain, and, at the peak, finds Cragger with a machine containing both the Golden Chi orb and a multitude of ordinary Chi orbs, which will threaten to overload and disrupt the balance of the Chi if activated. Laval fights and defeats Cragger, but is unable to prevent the activation of the machine. Cragger boasts that, with the Chi out of balance, he will soon possess "triple Chi power", before making his escape.

Laval reports back to his father Lagravis, but they receive word that the eagle and gorilla tribes are under attack. Laval heads into each tribe's territory to fight off the aggressors (the wolf and raven tribes, respectively), and rescue the captured (including his friends Eris and Gorzan), but each time the aggressor tribe gets away with a piece of the legendary Triple-Chi Armour.

Next, Cragger leads an attack on the Lion Temple, eventually kidnapping Lagravis in order to find the final piece of the armour. Laval meets up with his friends, including Worriz, who wants to get back at Cragger for supposedly betraying the wolf tribe by keeping the power of the triple Chi armour for himself. They enter rhino territory to find out more about the armour, and battle Cragger once again, eventually leading them to Crocodile territory. Here Cragger breaks free of his sister Crooler's control, and joins the others to fight his sister and rescue Lagravis. Worriz takes the full set of armour for himself, after learning that its true power can be activated at the top of Spiral Mountain.

The team ascends Spiral Mountain, under heavy guard by the wolf tribe, and eventually find Worriz at the peak, unable to control himself (caused both by the power of the armour and the full moon). Laval and his friends fight and defeat Cragger, and Eris recites the legend of the armour, that its power must be used when the Chi is unbalanced, to restore the land to normal. Laval realizes that he is partially to blame; Cragger set the trap, but he ran straight into it. Impressed that his son has started to realize his own limitations, Lagravis dons the armour and uses its power to restore the balance of the Chi and fix the damage caused to the land.

Unfortunately, Crooler appears and reinfects Cragger with her persuader plant. They escape, but Lagravis is content with the fact that the Chi balance has been restored, saying that the lion tribe will continue to protect it.

== Reception ==
Reception

Aggregate score
Aggregator	Score		
Aggregator	3DS	DS	PS Vita
Metacritic	65/100	N/A	64/100

Review scores
Publication	Score		
Publication	3DS	DS	PS Vita
4Players	62%	N/A	62%
Jeuxvideo.com	14/20	13/20	14/20
Nintendo World Report	6/10	N/A	N/A
PlayStation Official Magazine – Australia	N/A	N/A	6/10
PlayStation Official Magazine – UK	N/A	N/A	7/10
Pocket Gamer	N/A	N/A	3/5
The Digital Fix	N/A	N/A	6/10
Forbes	N/A	N/A	6.5/10

The 3DS and PlayStation Vita received "mixed" reviews, while the DS version received "overwhelming dislike", according to the review aggregation website Metacritic.
