= Lego Star Wars Battles =

2019 video game

- Apple Arcade version's cover art
- Developers: TT Games Odyssey; Playdemic
- Publishers: Warner Bros. Games; Lucasfilm Games
- Director: Danny Bergmann
- Producer: Jeff Terra
- Composer: John Williams
- Series: Lego Star Wars
- Engine: Unity
- Platforms: Android (previously) Apple Arcade: iOS; iPadOS; macOS; tvOS
- Release: Android: WW: September 3, 2019 (Note: The game was discontinued worldwide for Android on July 1, 2021.); Apple Arcade: WW: September 24, 2021
- Genres: Deck-building, real-time strategy
- Modes: Single-player, multiplayer

Lego Star Wars Battles is a deck-building real-time strategy video game developed by TT Games subsidiaries TT Odyssey and Playdemic, and published by Warner Bros. Games and Lucasfilm Games. It released on September 3, 2019 for Android.

The game was discontinued on July 1, 2020, but was relaunched on September 24, 2021 on Apple Arcade.

== Gameplay ==
A screenshot from the game; featuring Luke Skywalker, (left) Darth Vader (right) and the game in center.

In the game, players build and upgrade their collection of characters, vehicles, and troops, representing the Light Side and the Dark Side of The Force. Characters in the game will include Darth Vader, Obi-Wan Kenobi, Luke Skywalker, Princess Leia, and Kylo Ren. The game features real-time strategy and tower defense mechanics, where players deploy units onto a battlefield to attack the opponent's base while defending their own. The objective is to destroy enemy turrets and the base within a set time limit.

The gameplay involves collecting and upgrading cards that represent different units and abilities. Each card can be leveled up to increase its power and effectiveness in battle. Players create decks from their card collection to develop their strategies, balancing offensive and defensive capabilities. The game requires players to manage their resources and choose when to deploy units and use special abilities. The arenas are inspired by various Star Wars locations and include environmental challenges.

The ranking system matches players with opponents of similar skill levels. Winning matches rewards players with resources and cards to enhance their collection. The game offers various events and challenges for additional rewards and progression.

== Development ==
According to Pocket Gamer, the game was set to release in 2020 for both Android and Apple Arcade. Instead, only released on Android. The game shut down in 2021 and released again the same year for Apple Arcade.

== Release ==
=== Discontinuation ===
After beta testing for almost two years, in May 2021, players received an in-game message that Lego Star Wars Battles would be shutting down, and was done so on July 1, 2021. Neither did the developers, TT Games Odyssey and Playdemic, nor did the publishers of the game, Warner Bros. Games and Lucasfilm Games announce or comment on why the game got discontinued.

=== Apple Arcade relaunch ===
A few months after the discontinuation, the Warner Bros. Games and Playdemic announced the game's relaunch on Apple Arcade. The game released on September 24, 2021. Tom Phillips for Eurogamer stated that "Screenshots of the game's new Apple Arcade version show it looking the same as ever, although presumably the ability to make in-game purchases has now been stripped out."

== Reception ==
Reception

Aggregate score
Aggregator	Score
Metacritic	71/100

Review scores
Publication	Score
Metro	7/10
Multiplayer.it	8/10
Pocket Tactics	7/10

Lego Star Wars Battles received "mixed or average" reviews according to review aggregator website Metacritic.

Metro GameCentral rated the game 7/10, Multiplayer.it rated the game 8/10, and Pocket Tactics also rated the game 7/10.

All reviewers stated that the game is similar or reminiscent of Clash Royale with statements like "a clone of Clash Royale" and "basically Clash Royale in Lego form." A few critics complimented the simplicity of the mechanics of the game, whereas a few critics complimented the "reasonable balance" of the game.

== See also ==
- Lego Star Wars: Castaways
