= WB Games Montréal =

Canadian video game developer

Warner Bros. Games Montréal Inc.
- Logo used since 2019
- Type: Subsidiary
- Industry: Video games
- Founded: 2010; 16 years ago
- Headquarters: Montreal, Quebec, Canada
- Key people: Yves Lachance (VP, studio head)
- Number of employees: 350
- Parent: Warner Bros. Games
- Website: http://wbgamesmontreal.com/

Warner Bros. Games Montréal Inc. is a Canadian video game developer based in Montreal. It was founded as a subsidiary of Warner Bros. Games in 2010 and is best known for developing Batman: Arkham Origins and Gotham Knights. They have also provided additional work and development support on several games for Warner Bros. Games.

== History ==
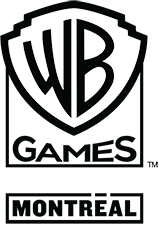
Warner Bros. Games Montréal logo from its foundation in 2010 to 2020

Warner Bros. Games Montréal was founded in 2010 by Warner Bros. Interactive Entertainment (now Warner Bros. Games).

One of the studio's titles, Batman: Arkham Origins, was displayed for the public at the 2013 Electronic Entertainment Expo (E3), and received two nominations from the Game Critics Awards for Best Action/Adventure Game and Best Console Game. Upon Batman: Arkham Origins's release it received mixed reactions, garnering praise for its boss battles and the characterization of Batman, as well as criticism for not moving the series forward compared to previous entries in addition to technical issues.

During an interview on the Humans of Gaming Podcast in October 2018, Warner Bros. Games Montréal Senior Game Designer Osama Dorias confirmed that two DC Comics-based video games are currently in development at the studio. At DC FanDome in August 2020, the studio announced Gotham Knights.

In July 2024, Warner Bros. announced that it had hired Bethesda Game Studios director Yves Lachance as vice president and studio head of Warner Bros. Games Montréal.

== Games ==
List of games developed by WB Games Montréal
Year	Title	Platform(s)	Notes
2012	Batman: Arkham City - Armoured Edition	Wii U	Port of Batman: Arkham City for Wii U, original game developed by Rocksteady Studios
2013	Cartoon Universe	Browser	—
2013	Lego Legends of Chima Online	Windows, browser, iOS	—
2013	Batman: Arkham Origins	Windows, PlayStation 3, Wii U, Xbox 360	—
2014	Scooby Doo! & Looney Tunes Cartoon Universe: Adventure	Windows, Nintendo 3DS	Additional work and development support
2015	Batman: Arkham Knight	Windows, PlayStation 4, Xbox One	Developed the Harley Quinn, Red Hood, Batgirl: A Matter of Family, and Scarecrow Nightmare DLC content, as well as provided additional work and development support for the base game.
2015	Mad Max (2015 video game)	Windows, PlayStation 4, Xbox One, Linux, MacOS	Additional work and development support
2017	Injustice 2	Windows, PlayStation 4, Xbox One, Android, iOS	Additional work and development support
2017	Middle-earth: Shadow of War	Windows, PlayStation 4, Xbox One	Additional work and development support
2019	Mortal Kombat 11	Windows, PlayStation 4, Xbox One, Nintendo Switch, Stadia	Additional work and development support
2022	Lego Star Wars: The Skywalker Saga	Windows, PlayStation 4, Xbox One, Nintendo Switch, PlayStation 5, Xbox Series X	Additional work and development support
2022	Gotham Knights	Windows, PlayStation 5, Xbox Series X	—
2023	Hogwarts Legacy	Windows, PlayStation 4, Xbox One, Nintendo Switch, PlayStation 5, Xbox Series X, Nintendo Switch 2	Additional work and development support
2023	Mortal Kombat 1	Windows, PlayStation 5, Xbox Series X, Nintendo Switch	Additional work and development support
2024	Suicide Squad: Kill the Justice League	Windows, PlayStation 5, Xbox Series X	Additional work and development support
2026	Lego Batman: Legacy of the Dark Knight	Windows, PlayStation 5, Xbox Series X, Nintendo Switch 2	Co-developer, additional work and development support
