= Lego Harry Potter: Years 5–7 =

2011 video game

- Developers: Traveller's Tales; TT Fusion (handheld/mobile); Double Eleven (remaster)
- Publishers: Warner Bros. Interactive Entertainment; Feral Interactive (OS X)
- Director: Arthur Parsons
- Composers: Nicholas Hooper; Alexandre Desplat
- Series: Wizarding World
- Platforms: Android; Microsoft Windows; Nintendo 3DS; Nintendo DS; OS X; PlayStation 3; PlayStation Portable; PlayStation Vita; Wii; Xbox 360; PlayStation 4; Nintendo Switch; Xbox One; PlayStation 5; Xbox Series X/S; Nintendo Switch 2
- Release: 11 November 2011: NA: 11 November 2011; PAL: 18 November 2011 PlayStation Vita; NA: 6 March 2012; PAL: 9 March 2012 OS X; WW: 22 March 2012 iOS; WW: 3 May 2012 Android; WW: 28 September 2016 PlayStation 4; NA: 18 October 2016; EU: 21 October 2016 Nintendo Switch, Xbox One; NA: 30 October 2018; EU: 2 November 2018 PlayStation 5, Xbox Series X/S; WW: 8 October 2024 Nintendo Switch 2; WW: 16 October 2026
- Genre: Action-adventure
- Modes: Single-player, multiplayer

Lego Harry Potter: Years 5–7 is an action-adventure game developed by Traveller's Tales and published by Warner Bros. Interactive Entertainment. The sequel to Lego Harry Potter: Years 1–4 (2010), it was released on 11 November 2011 in North America and November 18 in Europe. The game is based on the Lego Harry Potter toy line and is based on the final three books and four films in the Harry Potter film series: Order of the Phoenix (2007), Half-Blood Prince (2009), Deathly Hallows - Part 1 (2010), and Deathly Hallows - Part 2 (2011). The game was initially released for PlayStation 3, Xbox 360, PlayStation Portable, PlayStation Vita, Wii, Nintendo DS, Nintendo 3DS, and Microsoft Windows. The first of three trailers was released 6 October 2011, and the demo was released on 1 November.

The OS X version of the game was released by Feral Interactive on 22 March 2012. A mobile version of the game was released in May 2012 and September 2016 for iOS and Android, respectively. The game was released for the PlayStation 4 on 21 October 2016, as part of the Lego Harry Potter Collection, which bundles the game with its predecessor, Lego Harry Potter: Years 1–4, and was also released for the Nintendo Switch and Xbox One on 30 October 2018. The bundle has also released on PlayStation 5 and Xbox Series X/S in October 2024, as well as Nintendo Switch 2 in October 2026.

The game received generally positive reviews, especially for the humor added to the game's narrative.

== Gameplay ==
Lego Harry Potter: Years 5–7's basic gameplay is similar to that of the previous game, covering a wide range of new characters, spells, locations and items adapted from the last three books and four films. The online play feature that appeared in Lego Harry Potter Years 1–4 is absent from the PS3 and Xbox 360 versions of the game. Some additional quality of life changes were made, such as Wingardium Leviosa no longer needing the spell to be selected for building and moving certain objects. There is also no level creator. The open world was overhauled, with London, Platform 9 3/4, and several new areas of Hogwarts being explorable in free roam.

== Development ==
Directly after Years 1–4 was announced, it was speculated that a Years 5-7 would be released in the near future. It was actually revealed to be planned for a holiday 2011 release on 19 May 2011 by an announcement by Warner Bros. and TT Games. In the instruction booklet for various Lego Harry Potter 2011 sets, a page shows an ad for the game with Harry and Voldemort having a climactic duel (Harry casting Expelliarmus and Voldemort shouting Avada Kedavra, a scene from the final book/movie). During an exclusive gameplay session with TT Games, it was announced that there would be an iOS version to be released on the iTunes App Store later that same year. The cover art for the game was released on 1 September 2011. A few days after, they released a trailer featuring Voldemort and Bellatrix. Those two, and a third, are available on the official site.

The game was released on the Mac App Store on 22 March 2012. On 3 May 2012, an iOS port of the DS game was released. This version was ported to Android on 28 September 2016.

== Reception ==
Reception

Aggregate score
| Aggregator | Score |
|---|---|
| Metacritic | (X360) 77/100 (PS3) 76/100 (PC) 80/100 (Wii) 76/100 (DS) 69/100 (3DS) 71/100 (Vita) 64/100 (iOS) 71/100 |

Review scores
| Publication | Score |
|---|---|
| Game Informer | 7.5/10 |
| GameSpot | 8/10 |
| GamesRadar+ | 4/5 |
| GameTrailers | 8.2/10 |
| IGN | 8/10 |
| Official Xbox Magazine (US) | 7.5/10 |
| VideoGamer.com | 8/10 |
| The Guardian | 4/5 |
| The Escapist | 3.5/5 |

The console versions of the game received generally positive reviews, while the handheld versions received mixed reviews. Review aggregator website Metacritic gave the game wildly different scores dependent on platform, with the PC version scoring the best at 80%, meaning "generally favorable reviews". Metacritic also gave the PlayStation Vita version a score of 64%, meaning "mixed or average reviews".

Justin Davis of IGN gave Lego Harry Potter: Years 5–7 an 8 out of 10. He praised the humorous cutscenes, the use of the film's music tracks, the amount of gameplay available after the main adventure is cleared, and that the "game is simple enough for anyone to pick up and play." Neil Davey from United Kingdom newspaper The Guardian scored the game at 4 stars from 5, saying "there's weeks of fun in this package."
