= Guardians of Middle-earth =

2012 video game

- Developers: Monolith Productions; Zombie Studios (PC)
- Publisher: Warner Bros. Interactive Entertainment
- Composer: Inon Zur
- Platforms: PlayStation 3; Xbox 360; Windows
- Release: PlayStation 3, Xbox 360; December 4, 2012; Windows; August 29, 2013
- Genre: Multiplayer online battle arena
- Modes: Single-player, multiplayer

Guardians of Middle-earth is a multiplayer online battle arena video game developed by Monolith Productions and published by Warner Bros. Interactive Entertainment. The setting of the game is Middle-earth, derived from The Lord of the Rings series, with various tie-ins to the film series of the same name, as well as The Hobbit film series. Guardians of Middle-earth was released for the PlayStation 3 and Xbox 360 consoles on December 4, 2012, via the PlayStation Network and Xbox Live Arcade respectively. A retail package is also released, which includes a download voucher for the game as well as a "Season Pass" for future downloadable content. It is no longer available on the PlayStation Network, and the game's servers are no longer operational. The game was later released for Windows on August 29, 2013.

== Gameplay ==
The game uses elements from the MOBA genre; pictured is a creep wave attacking an enemy tower.

Guardians of Middle-earth incorporates the standard elements of a typical multiplayer online battle arena (MOBA) game, with a strong emphasis upon team coordination. Up to ten players may split into two teams of five and from a pool of thirty-six guardians from The Lord of the Rings franchise, including Gandalf, Sauron and Radagast, and coordinate to win matches by destroying the opposing team's base. Unlike most other MOBA titles, Guardians of Middle-earth emphasizes home console, rather than desktop, gameplay, in order to gain a "cinematic" experience.

== Reception ==
Reception

Aggregate score
Aggregator	Score
Metacritic	(PS3) 75/100 (X360) 71/100 (PC) 56/100

Guardians of Middle-earth received mixed reviews. It scored a 7.5/10 from IGN. Many users have problems with the games interfacing on PC, as well as numerous glitches in connectivity.

As of April 2019, Steam has removed Guardians of Middle Earth from their store page.
