= Lego Legends of Chima Online =

2013 video game

- Developer: WB Games Montréal
- Publisher: Warner Bros. Interactive Entertainment
- Platforms: Microsoft Windows, OS X, iOS
- Release: Microsoft Windows, OS X: WW: 11 October 2013; iOS: WW: 10 March 2014
- Genre: Massively multiplayer online role-playing
- Mode: Multiplayer

Lego Legends of Chima Online was a massively multiplayer online role-playing video game based on the Lego Legends of Chima toy line, developed by WB Games Montréal and published by Warner Bros. Interactive Entertainment. It was released for Microsoft Windows and OS X on 11 October 2013 and for iOS on 10 March 2014. An Android version of the game was announced but never released. The game was closed on 1 June 2015 .

== Gameplay ==
As a part of the character creation, Legends of Chima Online allowed the choice from one of the animal warriors tribes: Bear, Eagle, Gorilla, or Lion. The players were able to select different body parts for their characters. The player was able to build and customize their kingdom in the world of Chima. Other features included an open world, missions to complete, secret areas to explore, and the ability to build and customize characters and their equipment.

=== Power Cards ===
Power cards were introduced to the game in late February 2014. They gave the player special in-game powers and abilities, or unlocked buildings which gave the player these things. Players scanned the cards with their iOS devices to activate their in-game reward. Power Cards can be found in a number of LEGO Chima sets.

=== Winterfest ===
During Winter 2013, a special event called "Winterfest" was introduced. Around the world, special snowy places appeared. In this event, players could fight bosses, and earn exclusive loot. This was the first of many events in the game.

=== Spring Break ===
During the Spring Half-Term Break, a special event occurred in the game where players could discover special areas, fight Gorilla bosses, and, like the other events, win exclusive loot. Only a few weeks later, the next event, "The Eagle's Challenge", began.

=== The Eagle's Challenge ===
During Spring 2014, a special event called the Eagle's Challenge was released where players had to look for Sugar Pits (Melting Caves) around CHIMA by following a trail of sweets on the ground. Inside the caves, players could battle Eagle bosses and earn exclusive loot. If a player was in a Sugar Pit when the event ended, the player would still be in it, but if the player left the cave after the event, it would disappear, the event being over.

=== The Outlands ===
The Outlands, from Season Two of the TV Series, was launched 15 July 2014. It included new areas, buildings, powers, bosses, weapons & armor, and much of the UI was updated. Income per hour houses changed to have consistent wait times, where previously the time between payouts increased with upgrades. A newspaper was added to display current and upcoming events as well as featured news updates.

== Development ==
Legends of Chima Online was developed for the younger audience, with kids from 7 to 12 years old in mind. While there were some differences between the browser and iOS versions regarding the user interface, they shared the same code base in order to apply the updates for both at the same time.

== Reception ==
Nick Tywalk of Gamezebo rated the game 80/100 points, saying it was "largely successful", despite lacking the originality of its predecessor. Jeff Cork of Game Informer stated that he was impressed by the game, calling it "an enjoyable, safe space for kids to play with their friends (and parents)". He also praised its cross-platform play with the mobile version. Chad Sapieha of Common Sense Media rated the game 4/5 stars, calling it potentially appealing for many children, but criticizing "mindless" combat and "conspicuously placed ads".
