= Lego Battles =

2009 video game

- European cover art
- Developer: Hellbent Games
- Publishers: Warner Bros. Interactive Entertainment; TT Games Publishing
- Series: Lego Battles
- Platform: Nintendo DS
- Release: NA: 9 June 2009; PAL: 26 June 2009
- Genre: Real-time strategy
- Modes: Single-player, multiplayer

Lego Battles is a Lego-themed real-time strategy video game developed by Hellbent Games and co-published by Warner Bros. Interactive Entertainment and TT Games Publishing in June 2009 for the Nintendo DS. There are a total of three different stories in the game with six different quests and 15 different levels in each quest, with the option of playing as the protagonists or the antagonists of each story (similar to the hero and villain campaigns in LEGO Batman: The Videogame). Quests are divided into three acts, each ranging in length of 4-6 levels. The game is based on the buildable toy lines of Lego themes such as Castle, Pirates, and Space themes.

== Gameplay ==
The main game is split into three stories based on classic Lego themes: Castle, Pirates, and Space. The player is also given the option to play as the enemy in each story as well, offering 6 stories in total, with 18 acts and 25 heroes (including 7 hidden heroes) to play with and use. The game also includes a free play mode, in which the player can customize the units in their army, choose the map, and pick certain other settings, such as game mode and starting bricks. There are 85 different playable units. The game has a wide variety of units from three distinct time periods including wizards, pirates, and aliens. Both the units and maps must be unlocked and bought with the in-game "LEGO studs" that appear in other Lego video games.

There are 12 maps in the game that can be unlocked and bought for use in free play mode. There are 4 of each types of map (the types being Mars, coast/island, and forest/grassland). However, there is no "random map" function, as in many other war-based strategy games. There are also a number of maps of all types which do not need to be unlocked at the start of the game. Each map features a different arrangement of 4 types of terrain: grass, dirt/rock, water/acid, and cliff. Each map also contains trees on certain parts of the grass. Mine seams are located in certain positions on the dirt. Buildings can only be built on grass, except for mines, which must be built on dirt-based mine seams; docks which must be built on dirt/water boundaries (the coast); and bridges that are built between bridge slots across the water. Water is impassable to all units except for transports and some specials. Cliffs are impassable to all units. Some water-based specials can't pass over dirt and grass, either.

== Reception ==
Reception

Aggregate score
Aggregator	Score
Metacritic	65/100

Review scores
Publication	Score
Game Informer	7.5/10
GameSpot	7/10
IGN	7.5/10
Nintendo Power	5/10

Lego Battles received "mixed or average" reviews, according to review aggregator Metacritic.

== Sequel ==
On 12 April 2011, a follow-up for the Nintendo DS was released entitled Lego Battles: Ninjago, based on the Lego Ninjago toy line.
