= TT Games =

British holding company

TT Games Limited
- Type: Subsidiary
- Industry: Video games
- Founded: 2005; 21 years ago
- Headquarters: Knutsford, England
- Key people: Michael Denny; (studio head); Jonathan Smith; (strategic manager)
- Products: Lego video games
- Parent: Warner Bros. Games (2007–present)
- Subsidiaries: Traveller's Tales; TT Games Publishing; TT Fusion; TT Odyssey
- Website: ttgames.com

TT Games Limited is a British holding company and a subsidiary of Warner Bros. Games. The company was established in 2005 through the merger of developer Traveller's Tales and publisher Giant Interactive (now TT Games Publishing). Its other branches include developer TT Fusion, animation studio TT Animation and mobile game studio TT Odyssey. The company is best known for its video games based on the Lego construction toy.

== History ==
In 2003, The Lego Group's video game division, Lego Interactive, commenced plans to develop Lego Star Wars: The Video Game, based on the company's licensed Lego Star Wars toy sets. They contracted Traveller's Tales to develop the game, though Lego soon stepped out of the video game industry. Tom Stone and Jonathan Smith of Lego Interactive's senior management formed Giant Interactive, gaining the exclusive licence for Lego video games. As work progressed, Traveller's Tales manager Jon Burton recognised the potential of the game and the Lego licence, and how effectively the two companies worked together. Lego Star Wars was released in 2005 to positive reviews and strong sales, wherefore Traveller's Tales acquired Giant Interactive in April, forming TT Games.

TT Games continued to produce Lego games to considerable success; Lego Star Wars II: The Original Trilogy received several awards and nominations in 2006, including the Best Gameplay Award at the British Academy of Film and Television Arts' 3rd British Academy Games Awards. In 2007, under advice from Farleys Solicitors, TT Games acquired developer Embryonic Studios and motion capture studio Centroid, which became TT Fusion and TT Centroid, respectively. On 8 November 2007, TT Games was bought by Warner Bros. Home Entertainment and became part of its video game division, Warner Bros. Interactive Entertainment (now Warner Bros. Games). For Burton's share, which amounted to an ownership of 80% in TT Games, Warner Bros. Home Entertainment paid roughly £100 million (US$210 million).

TT Games expanded into mobile games with the acquisition of Playdemic in February 2017 and the opening of TT Odyssey (originally named TT Games Brighton) in January 2018.

On 20 January 2022, a report published by Polygon detailed the amount of crunch that occurred at TT Games during the development of Lego Star Wars: The Skywalker Saga, including dozens inside the company being at odds with management, due to expressing frustration over tight development schedules, the company's crunch culture, and outdated development tools. In addition, the use of NTT (a new in-house engine that was being developed to replace TT's previous engine in attempt to avoid paying royalties for using a third-party engine like Unreal Engine or Unity) was extremely controversial within the company, as many employees had been pushing to instead use Unreal Engine. NTT turned out to be incredibly difficult to use, with some animations taking hours more to produce than they would on the old engine. As a result, The Skywalker Saga would end up being the only game developed by TT Games to use NTT, with the company deciding to use Unreal Engine going forward for its future projects. Follow-up reporting by Fanbyte revealed that management was dismissive of Polygon's investigation and attempted to bury it by releasing a trailer for the game on the same day. They also report that Director of Game Development Eric Matthews and Head of Game Mark Green, who had been identified as nepotistic hires, were a continuing source of conflict and miscommunication from management.

== Subsidiaries ==
=== Traveller's Tales ===
Traveller's Tales was founded in 1989 by Jon Burton and Andy Ingram. Traveller's Tales is based in Knutsford, England.

=== TT Games Publishing ===
TT Games Publishing was founded as Giant Interactive Entertainment in 2004 by managing director Tom Stone and head of production Jonathan Smith. Both Stone and Smith were formerly in the senior management of Lego Interactive, the video game division of The Lego Group, before that company closed. Giant Interactive took over the publishing duties for Traveller's Tales' Lego Star Wars: The Video Game, which were formerly handled by Lego Interactive, and became the exclusive licensee for Lego video games. Giant Interactive was acquired by Traveller's Tales in April 2005, and the two companies created TT Games. As a result, Giant Interactive became TT Games Publishing. TT Games Publishing is based in Maidenhead, England.

=== TT Fusion ===
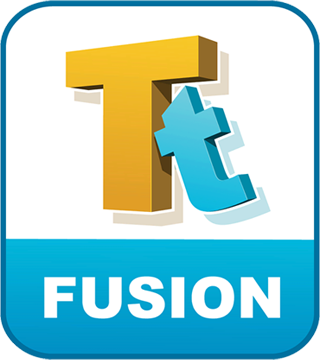

TT Fusion was founded as Embryonic Studios by Nick Elms, the co-founder of Warthog, in 2005. TT Games announced the acquisition of the studio on 4 January 2007, at which point Embryonic employed 20 people in its offices in Bollington. The deal was overseen by Farleys Solicitors, and the studio was renamed TT Fusion. TT Fusion is based in Wilmslow, England, developing ports of TT's games for handheld platforms and mobile phones.

=== TT Animation ===
TT Animation is TT Games' animation studio for film and television, run by Fraggle Rock co-creator Jocelyn Stevenson. The studio produced the film Lego Batman: The Movie – DC Super Heroes Unite, which was released in May 2013. The company also co-produced an original children's television property: What's Your News?, with Canadian studio Original Pictures.

=== TT Odyssey ===
TT Games announced the formation of TT Games Brighton, a mobile game development studio based in Brighton, England, on 30 January 2018. Jason Avent, who formerly headed Boss Alien, became the studio's head of studio. In March that year, TT Games Brighton was rebranded TT Odyssey.

=== Former ===
==== TT Centroid ====
Centroid Motion Capture Limited, a motion capture studio, was acquired by TT Games on 31 May 2007. Its assets, including 10 employees in its England headquarters, plus another 12 employees in its subsidiary studio in Serbia, were absorbed by a new entity, TT Centroid Limited and the company moved to Pinewood Studios in Buckinghamshire, England. The deal was overseen by Farleys Solicitors. They spun off in 2008.

==== Playdemic ====
Playdemic was founded in 2010 by Paul Gouge and Alex Rigby as a developer of Facebook Platform games. The company was acquired by RockYou in January 2011, and Gouge switched positions from chief executive officer to vice-president and general manager. When RockYou faced financial instability later that year, Playdemic performed a management buyout. In February 2013, Ian Livingstone was appointed as the company's chairman. TT Games announced on 8 February 2017 that it had acquired Playdemic to bolster its mobile game development capabilities. At the time, Playdemic had 33 employees in its Wilmslow offices. In June 2021, Playdemic was sold to Electronic Arts for $1.4 billion.
