= Joker (Arkhamverse) =

Video game incarnation of the DC Comics supervillain

The Joker
- Batman: Arkham character
- The Joker as depicted in the original Batman: Arkham trilogy.
- First appearance: Batman: Arkham Asylum (2009)
- Last appearance: Batman: Arkham Shadow (2024)
- Based on: Joker by Bill Finger, Bob Kane, and Jerry Robinson
- Voiced by: Mark Hamill; Troy Baker

The Joker is a character in the Batman: Arkham series of video games. He is based on the DC Comics supervillain of the same name, created by Bill Finger, Bob Kane, and Jerry Robinson, and was adapted for a continuity developed principally by Rocksteady Studios. The character debuted in Batman: Arkham Asylum (2009), in which he is voiced by Mark Hamill. Hamill portrays the older version of the character in Rocksteady's main trilogy and Batman: Arkham VR, while Troy Baker voices a younger Joker in the prequels Batman: Arkham Origins, Batman: Arkham Origins Blackgate, and Batman: Arkham Shadow. J. P. Karliak also voices a version of the Joker from an alternate universe in the spinoff game Suicide Squad: Kill the Justice League (2024).

The continuity established by the Batman: Arkham games is often referred to as the "Arkhamverse". The Arkhamverse incarnation is depicted as Batman's archenemy with an increasingly intimate psychological counterpart to him. In Arkham Asylum, the Joker seizes control of the titular institution in a plan to create an army of mutant monsters and attack Gotham City. Batman: Arkham City (2011) centers part of its story on his terminal illness and subsequent death, while Batman: Arkham Knight (2015) reintroduces him as a chemically-induced hallucination representing Batman's fear that the Joker's personality will overtake him. The 2013 prequel to Arkham Asylum, Arkham Origins, instead depicts their first encounter and the beginning of the Joker's fixation on Batman.

Both the Arkhamverse iteration of the character and Hamill's performance received widespread praise. Hamill won the D.I.C.E. Award for Outstanding Achievement in Character Performance for Arkham Asylum and the British Academy Games Award for Performer for Arkham City, while the Joker was named Character of the Year at the 2011 Spike Video Game Awards. The incarnation has also received scholarly and cultural analysis for the way he functions as an antagonist and guide, his relationship with Batman, and his continued narrative presence after death.

== Development and portrayal ==
The Joker was created for DC Comics by Bill Finger, Bob Kane, and Jerry Robinson, although the extent of each creator's contribution remains disputed. Robinson said that he conceived a visually distinctive and enduring archvillain for Batman after sketching a joker playing card, while Finger connected the design to Conrad Veidt's portrayal of the disfigured Gwynplaine in the 1928 film The Man Who Laughs, whose fixed grin influenced the character's appearance. The character debuted in Batman #1 in 1940 before being adapted across film, television, animation, and video games.

Batman: Arkham Asylum was conceived as an original Batman story rather than an adaptation of a particular film, comic book, or television production. This gives its developers latitude to combine elements from different versions of the franchise. DC Comics approached writer Paul Dini, who had previously written the Joker for the DC Animated Universe, to devise an original story suited to a video game. Dini developed the narrative collaboratively with Rocksteady's story and design staff, including lead narrative designer Paul Crocker. He described game writing as an iterative process in which story scenes and dialogue had to be repeatedly revised around gameplay and technology. Crocker said the team drew from memorable Batman stories while attempting to reconcile dedicated fans' expectations with broader popular understandings of the characters.

Because of the asylum setting, the Joker was established early as a major part of the first game's story. The developers avoided basing him on a contemporary film portrayal. The character model for this iteration of the Joker as thinner, lankier, and more indebted to the comics than the iteration played by Heath Ledger in The Dark Knight. Dini said that seeing the character models encouraged him to take the Joker into darker territory than in his animated work. Discussing the game's balance of cutscenes, the Joker's announcements over the public-address system, and environmental recordings, director Sefton Hill said Rocksteady used cutscenes primarily to develop relationships and alter the player's understanding of the story rather than to show action unavailable during gameplay. He said each scene was intended to change either the circumstances of play or the perceived importance of the player's actions.

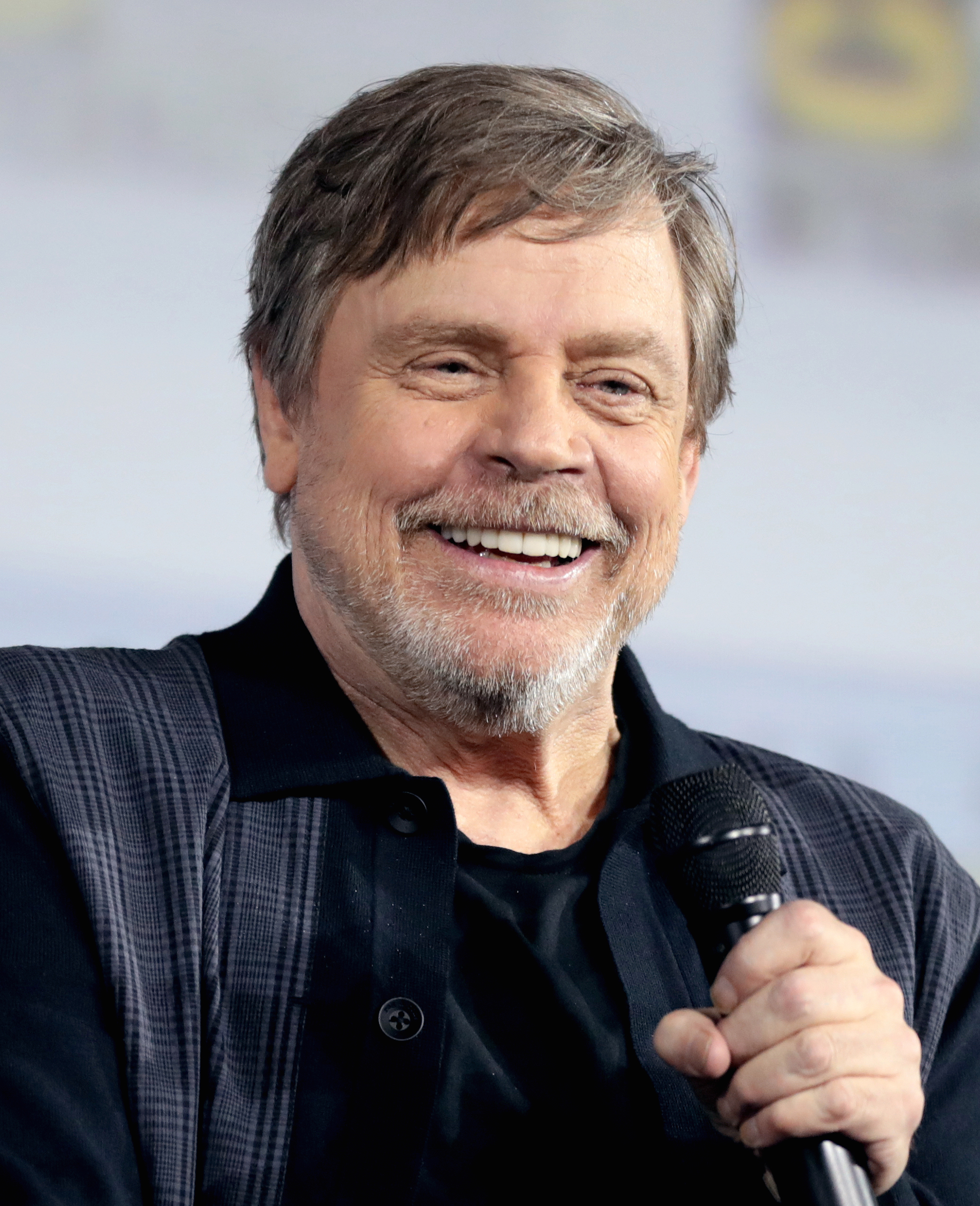
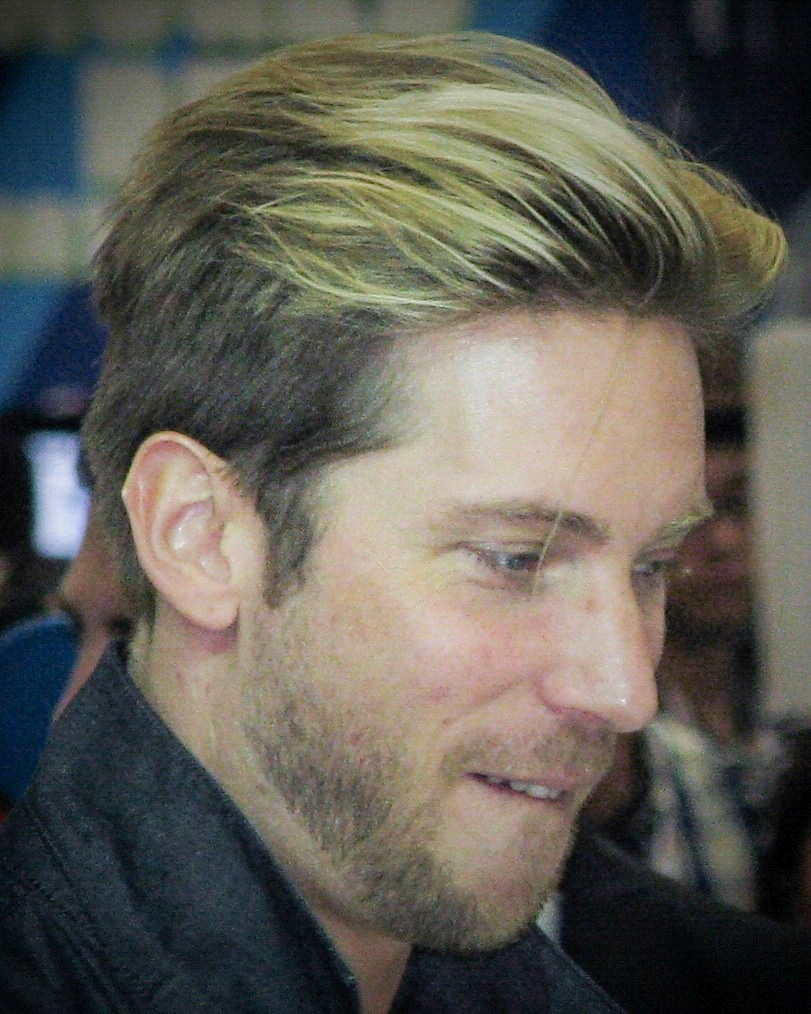
The Joker's voice actors for the Batman: Arkham series, Mark Hamill (left) and Troy Baker (right).

Hamill had voiced the Joker in Batman: The Animated Series and related productions before being cast in Arkham Asylum. The game reunited him with Dini and Batman actor Kevin Conroy, but its intended older audience allowed the creative team to make the character more violent than the television incarnation. Hamill later called the result a "whole new Joker", attributing the difference to the games' darker tone and freedom from children's television standards. Dini similarly said the games pursued a more intense tone than the animated series while retaining characters familiar to Batman audiences.

For the prequel Arkham Origins, developed by WB Games Montréal, Baker replaced Hamill as a younger Joker. The casting prompted comparisons with Hamill because Baker adopted many of the established performance's vocal characteristics. During a 2013 promotional event for Arkham Origins, Baker performed a monologue from Alan Moore and Brian Bolland's Batman: The Killing Joke, a comic closely associated with the character. Baker later reprised the younger incarnation in Arkham Origins Blackgate, the animated film Batman: Assault on Arkham, and Arkham Shadow.

Rocksteady planned the Joker's death in Arkham City relatively early in development. Hill recalled that DC Comics, Warner Bros., and Rocksteady accepted the decision provided it was clear that Batman did not deliberately kill him. The developers instead made the Joker responsible for his own death when his attempt to attack Batman caused the cure to be destroyed; Hill described this as a "poetic" conclusion arising from the Joker's inability to resist betraying Batman. He considered killing such a central character a striking and almost taboo ending. While promoting Arkham Knight, Hill said the death had "huge consequences" for the sequel and reflected Rocksteady's preference for events that permanently changed its continuity rather than returning the story to an unchanged equilibrium.

== Appearances ==
The Joker first appears in Batman: Arkham Asylum, in which he permits Batman to return him to Arkham Asylum as part of a plan to seize the institution. After releasing its inmates, he communicates with Batman through the asylum's public-address system and directs him toward a succession of traps and encounters. The Joker seeks to create an army of enhanced followers using Titan, a derivative of the drug used by Bane, and injects himself with it after Batman foils the plan. Batman defeats him after the mutation. The Joker was also made playable in challenge maps in the PlayStation 3 version of the game and the Return to Arkham remastered versions of the first two games.

In Batman: Arkham City, the Joker has been confined within the eponymous mega-prison and is dying as a consequence of his Titan exposure, while fighting for territory and supplies with Two-Face and the Penguin. He infects Batman with his blood and distributes it to Gotham hospitals in order to force him to obtain a cure. He also uses the shapeshifter Clayface as a healthy-looking double. After Batman recovers the cure, the Joker attacks him and inadvertently destroys the remaining dose. Batman tells him that he would nevertheless have saved him, after which the Joker dies laughing. The character's death supplies the premise for the downloadable story Harley Quinn's Revenge, in which Harley Quinn attempts to avenge him.

Batman: Arkham Origins, set earlier in the continuity, presents the Joker as the true organizer of a bounty placed on Batman while he impersonates Black Mask. During their second encounter, Batman saves the Joker from falling to his death. The act fascinates the Joker, who becomes preoccupied with understanding Batman and comes to regard him as a necessary counterpart. A playable sequence set within the Joker's mind depicts his emerging interpretation of their relationship while he is interviewed by Blackgate Penitentiary psychiatrist Harleen Quinzel. The Joker creates a riot at Blackgate and takes over it with Bane's help, before being defeated by Batman again. The same younger incarnation appears as a playable character in Origins' multiplayer mode, and in Arkham Origins Blackgate and Assault on Arkham. Baker briefly reprises the character in Arkham Shadow, set several months after Origins, where the Joker is still imprisoned at Blackgate.

Although physically dead, the Joker repeatedly appears as a hallucination to Batman in Arkham Knight after he is exposed to a combination of the Joker's infected blood and Scarecrow's fear toxin. The apparition torments and manipulates Batman, who fears that the Joker's personality will replace his own. During the final confrontation, Batman overcomes that fear and confines the Joker to a locked corner of his mind.

The character appears again as a psychological projection in Batman: Arkham VR.

== Reception ==
=== Critical response ===
Critics frequently singled out Hamill's performances as the Joker. Kohler wrote that Hamill "runs the show" in Arkham Asylum, observing that the actor had greater freedom to portray the Joker as deranged than in the animated television series. Reviewing Arkham City for Game Informer, Reiner stated that Hamill's performance "couldn't be better". Alessandro Fillari of GamesRadar+ opined that Hamill's work on the Batman: Arkham series is arguably his best as the character.

Hamill's work in Arkham Asylum won Outstanding Achievement in Character Performance at the 13th Annual Interactive Achievement Awards, later renamed the D.I.C.E. Awards. His performance in Arkham City won the British Academy Games Award for Performer, and his return in Arkham Knight was nominated in the same category. The Joker's Arkham City appearance was separately named Character of the Year at the 2011 Spike Video Game Awards.

Reiner described Baker's voice work for Arkham Origins as a remarkably successful recreation of Hamill's voice, while also praising the prequel's exploration of the Joker's developing psychology. He wrote that Arkham Origins became the Joker's game once the character appeared and considered its psychological material the most compelling part of the story. Philip Kollar of Polygon similarly wrote that, although the Joker had served as the principal antagonist of the preceding games, Origins cast new light on him by depicting his first meeting with Batman and exploring his distorted psychology.

Critical response to the character contrasted praise for his voice performance and narrative prominence with criticism of his physical transformation in the climax of Arkham Asylum, with several reviewers criticizing the game's boss encounters for relying on repetitive and conventional action-game patterns and for failing to match their narrative build-up. Tom Hoggins of The Daily Telegraph and Edge singled out the final confrontation with the Titan-enhanced Joker for what they considered insubstantial gameplay. Andy Kelly of PSM3 considered the encounters anticlimactic, while Dan Whitehead of Eurogamer criticized the repetition of mechanics already used against lesser Titan-enhanced enemies. Kohler nevertheless positively identified the Joker as the central character of the game, albeit its final hours are weaker than its earlier portions.

Writer and game designer Emily Short considered Batman's resistance to the Titan serum a strong thematic dilemma because it connected the question of his resemblance to his enemies with the immediate conflict against the Joker. Short found that the physical battle with the Joker at the conclusion of the game was another conventional boss encounter whose principal mechanic differed little from those used earlier in the game. Laurent Checola of Le Monde similarly described the ending as both grandiose and grotesque, arguing that the transformed Joker more closely resembled Violator from Spawn than the complex DC Comics character who had driven the preceding action.

Matt Peckham of Time considered Arkham Knight's handling of whether the Joker was truly gone to be the game's most successfully executed narrative component, praising Rocksteady for preserving the consequences of his death rather than simply reversing it.

=== Analysis ===
Kristin M. S. Bezio examined the incarnation in the chapter "Playing (with) the Villain: Critical Play and the Joker-as-Guide in Batman: Arkham Asylum", published in the University Press of Mississippi collection The Joker: A Serious Study of the Clown Prince of Crime. Bezio argued that the opening, which begins after the Joker has apparently already been captured, overturns the expected structure of a superhero narrative. She characterized the Joker as both villain and guide: he orchestrates the primary narrative, issues directions that Batman and the player must follow, and makes the player's progress dependent upon participating in his game. Kohler made a similar comparison, writing that the Joker was the first game's central character despite Batman's title role and that his announcements and taunts performed both narrative and gameplay functions comparable to GLaDOS in Portal.

Media scholar Johan Nilsson included Arkham Asylum in a comparative study of the Joker's use of television and other media technologies across different adaptations. Nilsson argued that these intermedial appearances emphasize the materiality and temporality of the media being used, promoting immersion while simultaneously creating tension by destabilizing the act of viewing.

Anupama Kodencheri and Gandhapodi K. Chithra interpreted the Joker's takeover of Arkham as a carnivalesque reversal of the institution's established hierarchy. They argued that his laughter, dancing, and release of the inmates transform the asylum into a temporary carnival in which the authority of its administrators and Batman is disrupted. The authors also examined his indirect presence through monitors and the public-address system, through which he controls Batman and his followers while remaining physically elusive. They interpreted his eventual Titan mutation as the culmination of his transformation into a grotesque posthuman figure, whose unstable and monstrous body challenges the physical order and authority represented by Batman.

Fillari wrote that the games place increasing emphasis on the Joker's belief that he and Batman define one another, expanding a theme only briefly explored in the animated series and presenting their conflict as seemingly inevitable. Writing for Them, James Factora interpreted the characters' dynamic in Arkham City as codependent and overtly homoerotic. Factora argued that the Joker's repeated telephone calls, romantic language, forced blood transfusion, and insistence that neither man can exist without the other make this subtext integral to the game rather than incidental.

== See also ==
- Joker in other media
