= Batman: Arkham =

Superhero video game series

- The "Bat" logo for the series, as seen on the Batman: Arkham Collection (2013) box art, featuring the color schemes (from left to right) used on the Arkham Asylum, Arkham City, and Arkham Origins logos
- Genres: Action-adventure, Stealth
- Developers: Rocksteady Studios; WB Games Montréal; Splash Damage; Human Head Studios; NetherRealm Studios; Armature Studio; Turbine, Inc.; Turn Me Up; Camouflaj
- Publishers: Eidos Interactive (2009); Warner Bros. Games (2009–present); Oculus Studios
- Writers: Paul Dini; Paul Crooker; Corey May; Dooma Wendschuh; Adam Beechen; Sefton Hill
- Platforms: Android; iOS; Meta Quest 3; Nintendo 3DS; Nintendo Switch; OS X; PlayStation 3; PlayStation Vita; PlayStation 4; PlayStation VR; PlayStation 5; Wii U; Windows; Xbox 360; Xbox One; Xbox Series X/S
- First release: Batman: Arkham Asylum; August 25, 2009
- Latest release: Batman: Arkham Shadow; October 21, 2024
- Parent series: Batman video games

Batman: Arkham is a superhero action-adventure video game series based on the DC Comics character Batman, developed by Rocksteady Studios, WB Games Montréal, Armature Studio and Camouflaj, and published originally by Eidos Interactive and currently by Warner Bros. Games. The franchise primarily focuses on the long-lasting conflict between the titular Dark Knight and his archenemy, the Joker. It consists of four main installments and a spin-off, along with a handheld game, three smaller titles for mobile devices, two virtual reality games, tie-in comic books and novels, and an animated film. The continuity established by the games is often referred to as the "Arkhamverse".

The main games in the Batman: Arkham series have been met with success and critical acclaim, with praise for their narratives, voice acting, characters, world design, graphics, and gameplay. The games have collectively sold more than 32 million copies worldwide.

== Games ==
Year	Title	Platform(s)
2009	Batman: Arkham Asylum (Note: The Nintendo Switch editions were released as part of the Batman: Arkham Trilogy collection.) (Note: The PlayStation 4 and Xbox One editions were released as part of the Batman: Return to Arkham collection.)	macOS, Nintendo Switch, PlayStation 3, PlayStation 4, Windows, Xbox 360, Xbox One
2011	Batman: Arkham City (Note: The Wii U edition was released under the title Batman: Arkham City Armored Edition.)	macOS, Nintendo Switch, PlayStation 3, PlayStation 4, Wii U, Windows, Xbox 360, Xbox One
2011	Batman: Arkham City Lockdown	Android, iOS
2013	Batman: Arkham Origins	PlayStation 3, Wii U, Windows, Xbox 360
2013	Batman: Arkham Origins (mobile)	Android, iOS
2013	Batman: Arkham Origins Blackgate (Note: The console and PC editions were released under the title Batman: Arkham Origins Blackgate Deluxe Edition.)	Nintendo 3DS, PlayStation 3, PlayStation Vita, Wii U, Windows, Xbox 360
2015	Batman: Arkham Knight	Nintendo Switch, PlayStation 4, Windows, Xbox One
2016	Batman: Arkham Underworld	Android, iOS
2016	Batman: Arkham VR	PlayStation 4, Windows
2024	Suicide Squad: Kill the Justice League	PlayStation 5, Windows, Xbox Series X/S
2024	Batman: Arkham Shadow	Meta Quest 3, Meta Quest 3S

=== Main series ===
Release timeline
2009	Batman: Arkham Asylum
2010
2011	Batman: Arkham City
2011	Batman: Arkham City Lockdown
2012
2013	Batman: Arkham Origins
2013	Batman: Arkham Origins (mobile)
2013	Batman: Arkham Origins Blackgate
2014
2015	Batman: Arkham Knight
2016	Batman: Arkham Underworld
2016	Batman: Arkham VR
2017
2018
2019
2020
2021
2022
2023
2024	Suicide Squad: Kill the Justice League
2024	Batman: Arkham Shadow

==== Batman: Arkham Asylum (2009) ====
Batman: Arkham Asylum, the first game in the series, was written by veteran Batman writer Paul Dini and developed by Rocksteady. The game takes place entirely on Arkham Island, which houses the eponymous Arkham Asylum, home of some of Batman's most notorious foes. In the main storyline, Batman must once again stop his archenemy, the Joker, who has instigated an elaborate plot to seize control of Arkham and trap Batman on the island, while threatening Gotham City with hidden bombs. While fighting through the Asylum's inmates and attempting to restore order, Batman learns that the Joker has gained possession of a large quantity of Titan, an experimental chemical based on Venom, the drug used by Bane to enhance his powers, and must destroy it before the Joker can use it for his nefarious schemes. Kevin Conroy, Mark Hamill, and Arleen Sorkin respectively voice Batman, Joker, and Harley Quinn in the game, reprising their roles from the DC Animated Universe.

After its initial release, Arkham Asylum received downloadable content (DLC) that added new maps to the game's challenge mode, as well as the Joker as a playable character (albeit only on the PlayStation 3 and Return to Arkham versions).

==== Batman: Arkham City (2011) ====
Batman: Arkham City is the sequel to Arkham Asylum and features a bigger cast of characters and a story again written by Paul Dini, along with Paul Crocker and Sefton Hill. Set eighteen months after Arkham Asylum, the game sees Bruce Wayne incarcerated within Arkham City, a new super-prison based in the decaying urban slums of Gotham City, established by former Arkham Asylum warden and current Gotham mayor Quincy Sharp. While contending with various inmates taking advantage of Arkham City's lawlessness, Batman must uncover the secret behind a sinister scheme, code-named "Protocol 10", orchestrated by the facility's warden, Hugo Strange. At the same time, the Joker is slowly dying due to the unstable properties of the Titan formula in his blood, and infects Batman with the same disease to force him to find a cure. Kevin Conroy and Mark Hamill reprise their respective roles as Batman and the Joker.

Arkham City introduces side missions to the series, each focusing on different villains whose schemes Batman must thwart. It also features DLC that adds Catwoman as a playable character, along with her own campaign that runs parallel with the main story. In addition to Batman and Catwoman, the game's challenge mode also features Nightwing and Robin as playable characters. Another DLC, titled Harley Quinn's Revenge, adds a second campaign, set after the main story, in which Robin must rescue Batman after he is captured by a vengeful Harley Quinn in Arkham City.

==== Batman: Arkham Origins (2013) ====
Batman: Arkham Origins is a prequel to the series, taking place eight years before the events of Arkham Asylum. It was developed by WB Games Montréal and written by Assassin's Creed and Prince of Persia writers Corey May and Dooma Wendschuh. The game is the first in the series to feature multiplayer gameplay, developed by Splash Damage. The story follows a younger and less refined Batman, who has a bounty placed on his head by Black Mask, drawing eight of the world's deadliest assassins to Gotham City on Christmas Eve. While attempting to bring Black Mask to justice, Batman must also contend with the police, who want to apprehend him for his vigilantism, and other villains taking advantage of the chaos in Gotham. The plot features key moments in Batman's career, such as his first encounter with the Joker, and the beginning of his partnership and friendship with Jim Gordon. Arkham Origins features roughly the same setting as Arkham City—Old Gotham—but with several changes to reflect the different time period, as the area has yet to be transformed into Arkham City. The setting also incorporates a new area of the city, called New Gotham, located in the south, and the Batcave. Roger Craig Smith and Troy Baker voice Batman and the Joker, respectively, replacing Conroy and Hamill from the previous two games.

Like its predecessors, the game features DLC that adds new challenge maps and costumes for Batman, as well as Bruce Wayne and Deathstroke as playable characters in the challenge mode. The Cold, Cold Heart DLC adds a new story-driven campaign, set a week after the events of the main story, on New Year's Eve; it depicts Batman's first encounter with Mr. Freeze, borrowing heavy inspiration from the Batman: The Animated Series episode "Heart of Ice".

==== Batman: Arkham Knight (2015) ====
Batman: Arkham Knight is the sequel to Arkham City, the only one to receive an 'M' rating, and the biggest installment in the series. Intended to be the final Batman: Arkham game, it was developed once again by Rocksteady, and released for the PlayStation 4, Xbox One, and Windows on June 23, 2015. Set nine months after the events of Arkham City, the game sees the return of the villain Scarecrow, who forces a citywide evacuation in Gotham and unites several of Batman's greatest villains in an attempt to destroy the Dark Knight once and for all. Scarecrow is aided by the mysterious Arkham Knight, who has a personal vendetta against Batman and seems to know all of his secrets. Although aided by several allies, Batman's quest to stop the villains is hindered by the Joker, who, despite his death in Arkham City, lives on as a chemically-induced hallucination in Batman's mind and is slowly taking over his body. Arkham Knight is set in Uptown Gotham, which is located west of City and Origins' Old and New Gotham, and comprises three main islands: Bleake Island, Miagani Island, and Founders' Island. Kevin Conroy and Mark Hamill reprise their roles as Batman and the Joker, respectively.

DLC released for the game includes four side missions centered around the villains Killer Croc, Ra's al Ghul, Mr. Freeze, and Mad Hatter; short story-driven missions set both before and after the main story, focusing on characters other than Batman, such as Batgirl, Red Hood, Harley Quinn, Nightwing, Robin, and Catwoman; additional challenge maps; and skins for both the playable characters and the Batmobile (which makes its debut in the series as a driveable vehicle).

==== Suicide Squad: Kill the Justice League (2024) ====
A Suicide Squad game was first considered a possibility following Batman: Arkham Origins, which featured a post-credits scene in which Deathstroke is asked by Amanda Waller to join the Suicide Squad. In the years after Batman: Arkham Knight released, there were rumors suggesting the studio was working on a Suicide Squad game, but no official announcement was made from the development team or publisher. In December 2016, Jason Schreier from Kotaku revealed that the title had been cancelled, and WB Games Montreal shifted their focus to a new Batman game starring Damian Wayne as the new Dark Knight, but as confirmed in January 2024 by voice actor Josh Keaton who worked on the game, the title would not have been set in the Arkhamverse. In April 2017, Schreier reported that the Damian game had been cancelled and turned into a different Batman title, which was revealed to be Gotham Knights at the 2020 DC FanDome and is also unrelated to the Arkham series. As a result, Rocksteady Studios took over the Suicide Squad IP and started the development of a different game based on the faction and set after the events of Batman: Arkham Knight. Rocksteady was initially rumored to be working on a Superman-themed game, which they later debunked. The game's official artwork was revealed by Rocksteady on August 7, 2020.

The first trailer for the game premiered at DC FanDome, which revealed its title of Suicide Squad: Kill the Justice League along with its premise. On March 23, 2022, Rocksteady announced that the game had been delayed from its intended 2022 launch window to Spring 2023. On April 13, 2023, the game was again delayed to February 2, 2024, when it would eventually release for Windows, PlayStation 5 and Xbox Series X/S. Due to Kevin Conroy's passing in November 2022, the game marks one of his final performances as Batman, as well as his last time voicing the character in the Arkham series.

As Suicide Squad: Kill the Justice League is set in the Arkhamverse, plot threads established in the Batman: Arkham series are continued in the game, including the Joker's death in Batman: Arkham City and the public revelation of Batman's identity as Bruce Wayne in Arkham Knight. Unlike previous installments, the game is set in Metropolis rather than Gotham, which has come under attack by Brainiac and his army. After most of the Justice League, including Batman, is enslaved by Brainiac's mind-controlling technology, Amanda Waller assembles the Suicide Squad—Harley Quinn, Deadshot, Captain Boomerang, and King Shark—and sends them to Metropolis to stop Brainiac's invasion, pitting them against the brainwashed superheroes. The game supports up to four player co-op gameplay, allowing players to pick between any of the Squad members. After the initial launch, the roster of playable characters was expanded with the addition of alternate reality versions of the Joker and Mr. Freeze, as well as Deadshot's daughter Zoe Lawton / Lawless, and Deathstroke.

==== Batman: Arkham Shadow (2024) ====
On May 1, 2024, Batman: Arkham Shadow, the next installment in the series, was announced, to be released exclusively on the Meta Quest 3 in late 2024. Developed by Camouflaj and published by Oculus Studios, it is a direct sequel to Batman: Arkham Origins, with Roger Craig Smith reprising his role as Batman. Taking place six months after the events of Arkham Origins, the game follows Batman as he attempts to stop a mysterious villain called the Rat King from destroying Gotham on the Fourth of July, and depicts his transition from a violent and vengeful vigilante to a symbol of hope. Arkham Shadow was released on October 21, 2024, and was included for free with new Meta Quest 3 and Meta Quest 3S purchases until April 30, 2025.

=== Other games ===
==== Batman: Arkham City Lockdown (2011) ====
Batman: Arkham City Lockdown is an iOS and Android fighting game developed by NetherRealm Studios, the creators of Mortal Kombat 9, which serves as a spin-off and prequel to the events of Batman: Arkham City. The game features voice acting, with most of the actors reprising their roles from Arkham Asylum and Arkham City.

==== Batman: Arkham Origins (mobile) (2013) ====
Batman: Arkham Origins is an iOS and Android fighting game developed by NetherRealm Studios. It plays similarly to Arkham City Lockdown, and follows the same storyline as the console and PC versions of the game.

==== Batman: Arkham Origins Blackgate (2013) ====
Batman: Arkham Origins Blackgate is a side-scrolling game developed for the PlayStation Vita and Nintendo 3DS by Armature Studio. Set three months after the events of Arkham Origins, the story sees Batman investigating a mysterious explosion at Blackgate Prison that set the inmates free and allowed notorious crime bosses Joker, Black Mask, and Penguin to take over the prison. With the help of Catwoman, whom he encounters for the first time, Batman attempts to bring all three crime bosses to justice, in the process uncovering a dark secret about his newfound ally. A deluxe edition of the game, featuring new maps, enemy encounters, difficulty levels, batsuits and enhanced visuals, was released on the PlayStation 3, Xbox 360, Wii U, and Microsoft Windows in April 2014.

==== Batman: Arkham Underworld (2016) ====
Batman: Arkham Underworld was an iOS and Android game developed by Turbine, Inc. and released on iOS on July 14, 2016. Set a few years before the events of Arkham Asylum, the game gives players control over a team of villains—including infamous Batman enemies such as the Riddler, Harley Quinn, Mr. Freeze, Killer Croc, Scarecrow, and Bane—and has them build hideouts and recruit henchmen, with the goal of becoming Gotham City's "next criminal kingpin". Arkham Underworld features voice acting, with many actors reprising their roles from the main installments in the series. The game was shut down in 2017.

==== Batman: Arkham VR (2016) ====
In June 2016 at E3 2016, it was announced that Rocksteady was developing a Batman: Arkham game for the PlayStation VR, which released in October 2016. The game is set a few weeks prior to the events of Arkham Knight, and has players "utilize [Batman's] legendary gadgets to unravel a plot that threatens the lives of his closest allies." It was released for the Oculus Rift and HTC Vive on April 25, 2017.

=== Collections ===
==== Batman: Arkham Bundle (2013) ====
On September 23, 2013, the Batman: Arkham Bundle was released in North America for the PlayStation 3 and Xbox 360, as a Greatest Hits and Platinum Hits collection, respectively. It features the Game of the Year edition of Arkham Asylum, which includes the "Totally Insane", "Nocturnal Hunter", "Crime Alley", and "Scarecrow Nightmare" challenge maps, and the Game of the Year edition of Arkham City, which includes all additional content, including multiple skin DLC packs, as well as the extended story Harley Quinn's Revenge.

==== Batman: Arkham Collection (2013) ====
On November 22, 2013, the Batman: Arkham Collection was released in Europe for the PlayStation 3, Xbox 360, and Microsoft Windows. The collection features downloadable versions of Arkham Asylum and Arkham City, and a physical copy of Arkham Origins. In addition, the PlayStation 3 version features the Knightfall DLC pack for Arkham Origins, while Arkham Asylum and Arkham City are the Game of the Year editions on Windows.

==== Batman: Return to Arkham (2016) ====
Batman: Return to Arkham, developed by Virtuos, features remastered versions of Arkham Asylum and Arkham City using Unreal Engine 4 for the PlayStation 4 and Xbox One. Additionally, both games include all previously released downloadable content, and feature improved graphics, upgraded models and environments, as well as improvements in the lighting, effects and shaders. The collection was released on October 18, 2016, to mixed to positive reviews. Reviewers noted improvements to the textures and shading, but had split opinions on the visual design and lighting effects. The collection was also criticized for issues with its frame rate, having been capped at 30 frames per second, with Arkham City running uncapped at up to 60 frames per second at launch.

==== Batman: Arkham Collection (2019) ====
On September 6, 2019, the Batman: Arkham Collection was released in Europe for PlayStation 4 and Xbox One. It contains the remastered versions of Arkham Asylum and Arkham City from Return to Arkham and the premium edition of Arkham Knight. The physical edition of the collection includes discs for the first two games and a digital download code for the third game.

==== Batman: Arkham Trilogy (2023) ====
Although initially leaked via French retailer WTT in 2022, Batman: Arkham Trilogy was officially announced via Nintendo Direct on June 21, 2023. It contains Batman: Arkham Asylum, Arkham City, and Arkham Knight in one package with all of their respective DLC bundled in, and was released exclusively for the Nintendo Switch on December 1, 2023. It was developed by Turn Me Up. The physical edition only included Arkham Asylum on the cartridge, while Arkham City and Arkham Knight required a separate download. An additional alternate Batsuit inspired by Robert Pattinson's portrayal of the character in The Batman (2022) was added first to the Nintendo Switch version of Arkham Knight as part of the Trilogy before arriving on other platforms at a later date. The collection was dedicated to Kevin Conroy, who voiced Batman in Asylum, City and Knight.

== Characters ==
Character	Batman: Arkham games						Suicide Squad: Kill the Justice League
Character	Batman: Arkham Asylum	Batman: Arkham City	Batman: Arkham Origins	Batman: Arkham Origins Blackgate	Batman: Arkham Knight	Batman: Arkham Shadow	Suicide Squad: Kill the Justice League
Character	2009	2011	2013	2013	2015	2024	2024-25
Bruce Wayne Batman Irving "Matches" Malone	Kevin Conroy; Kimberly Brooks (child)	Kevin Conroy	Roger Craig Smith	Roger Craig Smith	Kevin Conroy	Roger Craig Smith; Max Mitchell (young)	Kevin Conroy
=== Introduced in Batman: Arkham Asylum ===
Bane	Fred Tatasciore	Fred Tatasciore	JB Blanc	No voice actor		Fred Tatasciore	
Frank Boles	Danny Jacobs					Jake Green	
Aaron Cash	Duane R. Shepard, Sr.	Duane R. Shepard, Sr.			Duane R. Shepard, Sr.		Duane R. Shepard, Sr.
Sarah Cassidy	Kimberly Brooks						
Joe Chill	Duane R. Shepard, Sr.					Armin Shimerman	
Dr. Jonathan Crane Scarecrow	Dino Andrade				John Noble	Elijah Wood	
Barbara Gordon Oracle / Batgirl	Kimberly Brooks	Kimberly Brooks	Kelsey Lansdowne		Ashley Greene	Chelsea Kane	
James "Jim" Gordon	Tom Kane; Rick D. Wasserman (Young)	David Kaye	Michael Gough	Michael Gough	Jonathan Banks	Mark Rolston	
Dr. Pamela Isley Poison Ivy	Tasia Valenza	Tasia Valenza			Tasia Valenza		Darcy Rose Byrnes
Joker	Mark Hamill	Mark Hamill	Troy Baker	Troy Baker	Mark Hamill	Troy Baker	J. P. Karliak (Note: This version of Joker is from an Elseworlds and member of his world's Suicide Squad.)
Waylon Jones Killer Croc	Steve Blum	Steve Blum	Khary Payton		Steve Blum		
Basil Karlo Clayface	Tom Kane Duane R. Shepard, Sr.	Rick D. Wasserman Mark Hamill					
Edward Nashton The Riddler / Enigma	Wally Wingert	Wally Wingert	Wally Wingert		Wally Wingert	Wally Wingert	Wally Wingert
William North	Roger Rose	Roger Rose					
Dr. Harleen Quinzel Harley Quinn	Arleen Sorkin	Tara Strong	Tara Strong		Tara Strong	Tara Strong	Tara Strong
Jack Ryder	James Horan	James Horan	James Horan		James Horan	James Horan	James Horan
Scarface	Mark Hamill	No voice actor			No voice actor	Dwight Schultz	
Quincy Sharp	Tom Kane	Tom Kane	Tom Kane				
Martha Wayne	Tasia Valenza	Tasia Valenza		No voice actor	No voice actor	Salli Saffioti	
Thomas Wayne	Kevin Conroy	No voice actor	No voice actor		No voice actor	Andrew Morgado	
Gretchen Whistler	Adrienne Barbeau						
Penelope Young	Cree Summer						
Victor Zsasz	Danny Jacobs	Danny Jacobs			No voice actor		
=== Introduced in Batman: Arkham City ===
Ra's al Ghul	Corpse only	Dee Bradley Baker			Dee Bradley Baker		
Talia al Ghul		Stana Katic					
Oswald Cobblepot The Penguin		Nolan North	Nolan North	Nolan North	Nolan North	Nolan North	Nolan North
Julian Day Calendar Man		Maurice LaMarche	No voice actor		No voice actor		
Harvey Dent Two-Face / Rat King		Troy Baker			Troy Baker	Troy Baker	
Tim Drake Robin		Troy Baker			Matthew Mercer		
Thomas Elliot The Identity Thief / Hush		Kevin Conroy			Kevin Conroy		
Nora Fries		No voice actress	No voice actress		Cissy Jones		
Victor Fries Mr. Freeze		Maurice LaMarche	Maurice LaMarche		Maurice LaMarche		
Cyrus Gold Solomon Grundy		Fred Tatasciore	Fred Tatasciore				
Dick Grayson Nightwing / Robin		Troy Baker	Josh Keaton		Scott Porter	Josh Keaton	
Selina Kyle Catwoman		Grey DeLisle		Grey DeLisle	Grey DeLisle	Chantelle Barry	
Michael Lane Azrael		Khary Payton			Khary Payton		
Floyd Lawton Deadshot		Chris Cox	Chris Cox	Chris Cox			
Abramovici / Mister Hammer		Fred Tatasciore					
Alfred Pennyworth		Martin Jarvis	Martin Jarvis		Martin Jarvis	Martin Jarvis	
Abramovici / Sickle		Steve Blum					
Roman Sionis Black Mask		Nolan North	Brian Bloom	Brian Bloom	Brian Bloom	Brian Bloom	
Hugo Strange		Corey Burton					
Jervis Tetch Mad Hatter		Peter MacNicol	Peter MacNicol		Peter MacNicol		
Vicki Vale		Grey DeLisle	Grey DeLisle		Grey DeLisle	Ali Hillis	
=== Introduced in Batman: Arkham Origins ===
Ferris Boyle			Stephen Tobolowsky			Stephen Tobolowsky	
Howard Branden			Chris Fries			Chris Fries	
Lester Buchinsky Electrocutioner			Steven Blum				
Harvey Bullock			Robert Costanzo				
Tracey Buxton			Laura Waddell				
Candy			Masasa Moyo				
Copperhead			Rosa Salazar				
Alberto Falcone			Quinton Flynn				
Martin Joseph			Khary Payton	Khary Payton		Khary Payton	
Kirigi			Kaiji Tang				
Ricky "Loose Lips" LeBlanc			Steven Blum			Walter Gray IV	
Gillian B. Loeb			JB Blanc				
Garfield Lynns Firefly			Crispin Freeman		Crispin Freeman	Crispin Freeman	
Cyrus Pinkney			Jim Ward				
Judge Harkness			Richard Epcar				
Lonnie Machin Anarky			Matthew Mercer			Matthew Mercer	
Sandra Wu-San Shiva			Kelly Hu				
Angel "Bird" Vallelungua			Christian Lanz			Jordan Reynolds	
Amanda Waller			CCH Pounder	CCH Pounder			Debra Wilson
Slade Wilson Deathstroke			Mark Rolston		Mark Rolston	Mark Rolston	Glenn Wrage
=== Introduced in Batman: Arkham Origins Blackgate ===
Rick Flag				Adam Baldwin		Chris Jai Alex	Jim Pirri
Ben Turner Bronze Tiger				Gary Anthony Sturgis		Zeno Robinson	
=== Introduced in Batman: Arkham Knight ===
Henry Adams					Garrick Hagon		
Christina Bell					Sara Cravens		
Deacon Joseph Blackfire					Marc Worden		
Jonathan Browne Johnny Charisma					Michael Rosenbaum		
Lucius Fox					Dave Fennoy		
Kate Kane					Tasia Valenza		
Albert King					Issac Singleton Jr.		
Francine Langstrom					Jules de Jongh		
Kirk Langstrom Man-Bat					Loren Lester		
Lex Luthor					Keith Silverstein		Corey Burton
Officer Owens					Dave Boat		
Nyssa Raatko					Jennifer Hale		
Warden Ranken					William Salyers		
Simon Stagg					Philip Proctor		
Jason Todd Arkham Knight / Red Hood					Troy Baker		
Raymond Underhill					JB Blanc		
Lazlo Valentin Professor Pyg					Dwight Schultz		
=== Introduced in Batman: Arkham Shadow ===
Lyle Bolton Lock-Up						Earl Baylon	
Boone Carver Shrike						Rick Gomez	
Christopher Dent						Andrew Morgado	
Carmine Falcone						Darin De Paul	
Otis Flannegan Ratcatcher						Khary Payton	
Christopher Nakano Takeo Yamashiro						Jonathan Ohye	
Leslie Thompkins						Mara Junot	
Arnold Wesker Ventriloquist						Dwight Schultz	
=== Introduced in Suicide Squad: Kill the Justice League ===
Barry Allen The Flash							Scott Porter
Princess Diana Wonder Woman							Zehra Fazal
Vril Dox Brainiac							Jason Isaacs
Tianna Cortez							Krizia Bajos
Victoria Frias Mrs. Freeze							Sara Cravens
Dr. Sydney Happersen							Dave B. Mitchell
George Harkness Captain Boomerang							Daniel Lapaine
Kal-El / Clark Kent Superman							Nolan North
Lois Lane							Seychelle Gabriel
Floyd Lawton Deadshot (Note: This version of Deadshot is African-American, who also claims that the Deadshot who appeared in the previous Batman: Arkham games was an imposter.)							Bumper Robinson
Zoe Lawton							Marley Soleil
Marcus Lo							Daisuke Tsuji
Taki Matsuda							Anne Yatco
Nanaue King Shark							Joe Seanoa
Mikron O'Jeneus Gizmo							Rick Pasqualone
Hiro Okamura Toyman							Christopher Sean
Flynn Russell							Camrus Johnson
John Stewart Green Lantern							Dan White
Zalika Hack							Omono Okojie

== Other media ==
=== Music ===
The first two games were composed by Nick Arundel and Ron Fish. Origins was composed by Christopher Drake, with Arkham Knight being composed by Arundel and David Buckley. Several soundtrack albums have been released.

=== Comics ===
==== Batman: Arkham Asylum tie-in ====
A 16-page, single-issue comic, Batman: Arkham Asylum – The Road to Arkham, was included in limited editions of Batman: Arkham Asylum. Written by Alan Burnett and illustrated by Carlos D'Anda, it is a prequel to the game.

==== Batman: Arkham City tie-ins ====
Starting in May 2011, DC Comics released a five-issue miniseries titled Batman: Arkham City. The miniseries was meant to bridge the gap between the story of Arkham Asylum and Arkham City the game. The series is written by Paul Dini, who wrote both Arkham Asylum and Arkham City, and is drawn by Arkham Asylum and Arkham City concept artist Carlos D'anda. The miniseries picks up one year after Arkham Asylum, where former Arkham Warden Quincy Sharp, now Mayor of Gotham City, has decided to close down Arkham Asylum. He decides to create "Arkham City" as the new "home" for all of Gotham City's thugs, gangsters and insane criminal masterminds, set in the heart of Gotham City. Inmates are under the watchful eye of Dr. Hugo Strange, and can roam free and do whatever they want as long as they do not try to escape.

In addition, 8-page digital-first interludes were released to expand on the story included in the miniseries, and were written once again by Dini as well as Derek Fridolfs and drawn by a variety of artists. The interludes focus on Batman's enemies as they vie for power within Arkham City. The interludes were later included in print in the Batman: Arkham City collected edition.

Batman: Arkham Unhinged is an original digital comic series that released in October 2011 alongside Arkham City the game. Derek Fridolfs is the main series writer and is drawn by many different artists. The stories spin directly out of events in the game itself, or are flashbacks to events prior to either game, allowing expansion on the background of the characters as they may have existed pre-Arkham City. The stories focus on Batman prominently, but some highlight the villains and the supporting characters as well. The stories were later released in print form.

Additionally, Batman: Arkham City – End Game was released in May 2012 as digital-first comics, and later in print, and is set after the events of Arkham City and before its downloadable content, "Harley Quinn's Revenge". The story is written by Derek Fridolfs with art by Jason Shawn Alexander.

==== Batman: Arkham Origins tie-in ====
Batman: Arkham Origins is a digital-first comic, based on the game of the same name. Batman: Arkham Origins is the first title to feature the new DC^{2} Multiverse technology, that features dynamic artwork, action sounds and the ability to integrate a soundtrack, and allowing the reader to determine the fate of each storyline and character, with multiple options and end results available in each comic chapter. The comic, set across eight chapters, is a prequel to the game's story, and was created by digital studio, Madefire.

==== Batman: Arkham Knight tie-ins ====
Batman: Arkham Knight is a digital-first prequel comic to the game of the same name. Written by Peter J. Tomasi, with art by Viktor Bogdanovic and Art Thibert, and covers by Dan Panosian, the comic picks up after the events of Arkham City. It was released digitally in February 2015, with the first print release featuring a collection of the digital issues in March 2015.

Batman: Arkham Knight – Batgirl Begins is a promotional one-shot comic that was distributed for free at San Diego Comic-Con. Written by Tim Seeley and illustrated by Matthew Clark and Wade Von Grawbadger, the comic tells the story of Barbara Gordon's first adventure as Batgirl.

Batman: Arkham Knight – Genesis, is a six-issue series written by Peter Tomasi and illustrated by Alisson Borges, that explores the origin of the Arkham Knight.

==== Suicide Squad: Kill the Justice League tie-in ====
Suicide Squad: Kill Arkham Asylum is a four-issue comic miniseries which serves as a prequel to Kill the Justice League, exploring how Amanda Waller took control of Arkham Asylum and recruited the members of the Suicide Squad.

==== Collections ====
- Batman: Arkham City (collects Batman: Arkham City #1–5 and Batman: Arkham City – Digital Chapters #1–5; 168 pages; hardcover, October 2011, ISBN 978-1401232559; paperback, September 2012, ISBN 978-1401234935)
- Batman: Arkham Unhinged
  - Volume One (collects Batman: Arkham Unhinged #1–5 and Batman: Arkham City – Digital Chapters #6–7; 160 pages; hardcover, February 2013, ISBN 978-1401237493; paperback, August 2013, ISBN 978-1401240189)
  - Volume Two (collects Batman: Arkham Unhinged #6–10; 168 pages; hardcover, August 2013, ISBN 978-1401240196; paperback, January 2013, ISBN 978-1401242831)
  - Volume Three (collects Batman: Arkham Unhinged #11–15 and Batman: Arkham City – End Game #1-6; 232 pages; hardcover, January 2014, ISBN 978-1401243050; paperback, August 2014, ISBN 978-1401246808)
  - Volume Four (collects Batman: Arkham Unhinged #16–20; 168 pages; hardcover, August 2014, ISBN 978-1401246815; paperback, February 2015, ISBN 978-1401250423)
- Batman: Arkham Origins (collects Batman: Arkham Origins chapters #1–14; 160 pages; hardcover, December 2014, ISBN 978-1401248864; paperback, July 2015, ISBN 978-1401254650)
- Batman: Arkham Knight
  - Volume One (collects Batman: Arkham Knight #1–4; 144 pages; hardcover, July 2015, ISBN 978-1401258047; paperback, January 2016, ISBN 978-1401266011)
  - Volume Two (collects Batman: Arkham Knight #5–9 and Batman: Arkham Knight – Batgirl Begins #1; 160 pages; hardcover, March 2016, ISBN 978-1401260675; paperback, July 2016, ISBN 978-1401263409)
  - Volume Three (collects Batman: Arkham Knight #10–12, Batman: Arkham Knight Annual #1, Batman: Arkham Knight – Robin Special #1, and Batman: Arkham Knight – Harley Quinn and Batgirl Special #1–2; 176 pages; hardcover, July 2016, ISBN 978-1401263393; paperback, November 2016, ISBN 978-1401265052)
- Batman: Arkham Knight – Genesis (collects Batman: Arkham Knight – Genesis #1–6; 144 pages; hardcover, March 2016, ISBN 978-1401260668; paperback, September 2016, ISBN 978-1401264444)
- Batman: The Arkham Saga Omnibus (collects Batman: Arkham Asylum – The Road to Arkham #1 and all previous collections, 1,648 pages, hardcover, September 2018, ISBN 978-1401284329)
- Suicide Squad: Kill Arkham Asylum (collects Suicide Squad: Kill Arkham Asylum #1–5, 120 pages, paperback, October 2024, ISBN 978-1779518385)

=== Film ===
An animated film set in the Arkhamverse, titled Batman: Assault on Arkham, was released on August 12, 2014. Many actors involved with the games reprised their roles, including Kevin Conroy as Batman, Troy Baker as the Joker, Martin Jarvis as Alfred, and Nolan North as the Penguin. The film takes place about two years before the events of Batman: Arkham Asylum, and focuses on the Suicide Squad—Deadshot, Harley Quinn, Captain Boomerang, Killer Frost, the Black Spider, and King Shark—who are sent by Amanda Waller to infiltrate Arkham Asylum and recover a classified file stolen by the Riddler. Although he is the title character, Batman is reduced to a supporting role, as he attempts to stop the Joker from destroying Gotham with a hidden bomb and briefly crosses paths with the Squad.

=== Novels ===
==== Batman: Arkham Knight – The Riddler's Gambit (2015) ====
A 320-page novel, Batman: Arkham Knight – The Riddler's Gambit, by Alex Irvine serves as a prequel to Batman: Arkham Knight.

==== Batman: Arkham Knight – The Official Novelization (2015) ====
Marv Wolfman authored a novelization of Batman: Arkham Knight, which was released in July 2015.

=== Real World Attractions ===
==== Arkham Asylum Shock Therapy ====
Arkham Asylum – Shock Therapy was a Vekoma SLC roller coaster located at Warner Bros. Movie World in Queensland, Australia. While the coaster was originally based on the Lethal Weapon film series, the ride was renamed and rethemed to the Arkham franchise.

==== Escape From Arkham Asylum ====
Escape From Arkham Asylum was a 2018 dark maze attraction based on Batman: Arkham Asylum, built as part of the Horror Made Here: A Festival of Frights event at Warner Bros. Studio Tour Hollywood in Los Angeles, California.

== Merchandise ==
Starting in January 2011, DC Direct released two series of statues based on characters in Arkham Asylum. As well, DC Direct, and later DC Collectibles, released four series of statues based on characters in Arkham City, starting in December 2011. On June 5, 2012, TriForce announced that they had acquired the license to create replicas of various weapons, gadgets and iconic objects from Arkham Asylum and Arkham City. DC Collectibles announced statues for release in October 2013 for Arkham Origins, as well as Mattel announcing statues of their own, releasing in late 2013. A board game, titled Batman: Arkham City Escape, was made available by Cryptozoic entertainment in May 2013.

== Appearances outside the games ==
The game Injustice: Gods Among Us featured the Arkham City Skin Pack, containing downloadable costumes for Batman, Catwoman, and the Joker, based on their appearances in Arkham City. An Arkham City skin is also available for Harley Quinn; however, unlike the other Arkham City skins, it must be unlocked through the iOS mobile app version. In addition, the Arkham Asylum arena features appearances by Hugo Strange, Scarecrow, Killer Croc, Two-Face, Riddler, and Penguin, all of whom appear as they did in the previous Arkham games. The iOS version of the game features the Arkham Origins skins for Batman, Deathstroke, Deadshot, Joker, and Bane, as well the Arkham Knight skins for Batman, Catwoman, Batgirl, Harley Quinn, and the exclusive character Arkham Knight. The Arkham Knight costume for Batman also appears in the iOS version of Injustice 2.

The character Arkham Knight eventually made his debut in the mainstream DC Universe. However, this incarnation is not Jason Todd, but rather Astrid Arkham, the daughter of Arkham Asylum director Jeremiah Arkham and Ingrid Karlsson. During her birth, a riot broke out during a prison transfer at the asylum. Despite the chaos, several villains assisted in delivering her safely, but one of the prisoners killed Ingrid with one of Batman's batarangs. Astrid grew up interacting with many of Arkham Asylum's patients and sympathized with their fear of Batman. After she found footage of her mother's death, she assumed Batman murdered her and trained herself for years to take away Batman's control over Gotham. She crafted the Arkham Knight identity to take vengeance on him, believing that the Arkham inmates were also his victims.

== Reception ==
Aggregate review scores As of September 8, 2025.
Game	Metacritic
Batman: Arkham Asylum	91/100 (PS3); 92/100 (X360); 91/100 (PC)
Batman: Arkham City	96/100 (PS3); 94/100 (X360); 91/100 (PC); 85/100 (WiiU)
Batman: Arkham City Lockdown	69/100 (iOS)
Batman: Arkham Origins	76/100 (PS3); 74/100 (X360); 68/100 (WIIU); 74/100 (PC)
Batman: Arkham Origins (mobile)	63/100 (IOS)
Batman: Arkham Origins Blackgate	68/100 (3DS); 61/100 (Vita)
Batman: Arkham Knight	87/100 (PS4); 85/100 (XONE); 70/100 (PC)
Batman: Arkham Underworld	64/100 (IOS)
Batman: Arkham VR	74/100 (PS4)
Suicide Squad: Kill the Justice League	60/100 (PS5); 61/100 (XSeriesX); 63/100 (PC)
Batman: Arkham Shadow	85/100 (MQuest)

The series has received widespread critical acclaim and commercial success, achieving lifetime international sales of 30+ million copies worldwide and high scores from critics and gamers. Arkham Asylum held the Guinness World Record for "Most Critically Acclaimed Superhero Game Ever" based on an average Metacritic score of 91.67, but was replaced by its sequel Arkham City in 2011. The game was praised as reaching to a darker side of Batman not seen in video games before. It was also acclaimed for its polished combat and stealth gameplay, as well as selection of gadgets at Batman's disposal and the extensive comic book lore and easter eggs planted all over the map of Arkham Asylum. Arkham Asylum also received positive feedback for its choice in voice actors, such as Mark Hamill and Kevin Conroy as The Joker and Batman, respectively. The game was included in many lists of the best games of 2009 and won several accolades, including Best Game at the BAFTA Video Games Awards and Game of the Year at the National Academy of Video Game Trade Reviewers. The Guardian included the game on its list of the 50 best videogames of the 21st century. Digital Trends put the game on its list of the best games of all time.

Arkham City has received the highest critical acclaim of the series, and won multiple awards, including Best Action-Adventure Game at the Golden Joystick Awards and Adventure Game of the Year at the D.I.C.E. Awards. The game was included in many lists of the best games of 2011 and is also considered as the greatest comic book video game of all time. It was heralded as taking the already innovative and intricate gameplay of its predecessor and largely expanding on it, as well as opening gameplay to a larger, greater detailed and intricate map. Hamill's return as a sick and dying Joker was very well taken by fans and critics alike, as well as the addition of other villains and heroes such as Robin, Catwoman, Hugo Strange, Calendar Man, and The Penguin. Arkham City currently holds the Guinness World Record for "Most Critically Acclaimed Superhero Game Ever" with the average GameRankings score of 95.94%. Metacritic and The Hollywood Reporter put the game among the best videogames of the decade 2010–2019.

Arkham Origins, while considered the weakest instalment of the series, was still generally well received. The major consensus among critics was the game lacked innovation and series advancement, many of them citing the similar gameplay and atmosphere of the game before, but that it still had an interesting and engaging story. The visuals were also slightly downgraded from the previous entry. This was largely attributed to the change in developers from Rocksteady to Warner Bros. Montréal. Arkham Origins was also criticized for its many bugs and glitches, especially on PC, as well as its odd and confined multiplayer. However, praise was directed at the voice cast and narrative, the game's depiction of the Joker as well as Batman's relationships with his adversaries. Most notably, critics agreed that Arkham Origins' boss battles were an improvement over its predecessors; they offered dynamic, multiphase conflicts with their own stories. While not considering all equally fun or impressive, reviewers said that their variety and unpredictability provided much excitement.

The console versions of Arkham Knight received critical acclaim but slightly less than Arkham City and Arkham Asylum. However, it was still better received than its predecessor (Arkham Origins) and became the fastest-selling game in the franchise. The game was included in many lists of the best games of 2015 and won several accolades, including Best British Game at the BAFTA Video Games Awards and Best Game at the Empire Awards. Praise was aimed at the narrative, score, writing, visuals, world designs, and gameplay, while most of the criticism was directed towards the game's overreliance on the Batmobile. The Windows version of the game was received with ambivalent responses, being criticized for numerous technical issues at the time of its launch, resulting in Warner Bros. removing the game from sale on Steam, and physical copies being removed from shelves, promising to work on performance issues. After its re-release, the game continued to receive criticism for lingering technical issues. The console versions were released with little to no technical problems. Mashable and BuzzFeed put the game among the best video games of the decade 2010–2019. Edge and USA Today put the game on their lists of the best games of all time.

== See also ==
- Gotham Knights: a video game developed by WB Games Montréal (who developed Arkham: Origins), featuring similar gameplay mechanics, aesthetics, and many of the same characters as the Batman: Arkham games, but with an original storyline not set in the Arkhamverse.
- Injustice (franchise): a video game fighting series developed by NetherRealm Studios, featuring characters from the DC Comics universe and various voice talents reprising their roles from DC Comics based media.
- Marvel's Spider-Man: An action-adventure video game series developed by Insomniac Games and based on Marvel Comics characters, set in an original interpretation of the Marvel Universe principally focused around Spider-Man. It follows many similar gameplay and narrative conventions to the Batman: Arkham series, which it has been favorably compared to.
