= Batman: Arkham Origins (mobile) =

2013 video game

- Developer: NetherRealm Studios
- Publisher: Warner Bros. Interactive Entertainment
- Director: Ed Boon
- Producer: Erin Piepergerdes
- Series: Batman: Arkham
- Engine: Unreal Engine 3
- Platforms: iOS; Android
- Release: iOS: WW: October 16, 2013; Android: WW: July 25, 2014
- Genre: Beat 'em up
- Mode: Single-player

Batman: Arkham Origins (also known as Batman: Arkham Origins Mobile) was a free-to-play fighting video game developed by NetherRealm Studios and published by Warner Bros. Interactive Entertainment. Based on the DC Comics superhero Batman, it is a spin-off to the 2013 video game Batman: Arkham Origins, and is part of the Batman: Arkham series. Similarly to Arkham City Lockdown, the game was made to tie-in with its console and PC counterpart, but unlike its predecessor, which featured an original storyline, it follows the same premise as the main versions of Arkham Origins.

The game was released for the iOS mobile operating system on October 16, 2013 and for Android on July 25, 2014. It received mixed reviews from critics, who noted its lack of depth and freemium structure that encouraged the purchase of microtransactions. On the Google Play store, the game surpassed five million downloads. Arkham Origins Mobile received its last update on April 21, 2014, and as of 2021, it is no longer available to download.

== Gameplay ==
Screenshot of the Thrillkiller suit

Arkham Origins relies heavily on an arcade-style combat system, and is not heavily story-driven. Using a series of quick, penetrated attacks by swiping and tapping the screen with their fingers, combined with blocking and altering Batman's stance, players can unleash a combo of strikes that can be used to defeat enemies one at a time. The default "Assault" stance allows more damage to be inflicted on enemies at the consequence of taking more damage, while the "Guarded" stance, which can be switched back and forth with the Assault stance during combat, allows the player to retain and strengthen their defense and offers them the ability to heal over time, but does not have the damage potential of Assault. After charging, the players also have the ability to use Special attacks, including Batswarm, Batarang, and Health Boost. Some specials give defensive/offensive buffs to the player, others heal the player, while some are offensive attacks. In addition to their normal basic attacks, enemies also have an uncounterable, more powerful "Enrage" attack activated after the player deals considerable damage, which can only be blocked.

The game uses stamina, with each mission requiring a certain amount of stamina, and when the player runs out of stamina, he has to wait for it to recharge, or buy more with money/premium currency. The types of currency used are "WayneTech/Wayne Enterprise" points, a premium currency used both to buy combat boosts, and Upgrade Points, the currency earned in-game. Upgrade Points are used in the Upgrades section, where the player can upgrade several things, including their stances, Special abilities, and their passive abilities (i.e. basic attack damage/critical rate), although WayneTech points can also serve the same purpose. In the Upgrades screen, the player can also acquire and upgrade Batsuits, using either WayneTech or Upgrade points. Each Batsuit costs a certain amount of currency, while certain Batsuits, like Darkest Night and Red Son, require unlocking through various purposes (i.e. logging on with a Warner Bros ID account). To upgrade Batsuits, the player has to acquire certain items, such as Tier 1 Armor or Arkham Origins Cowl, with each upgrade requiring a certain amount of the items, as well as different items (i.e. Red Son needs a Red Son Cowl, Arkham Origins needs an Arkham Origins Cowl). The items can all be earned by completing missions, which sometimes do or do not give items. Players can also use WayneTech points to "Detective Search" for items, which guarantees at least a single, random item. Each Batsuit upgrade/a better Batsuit acquisition will upgrade the player's stats, an example being that the Long Halloween suit has 5 more Speed than Arkham Origins, the starter suit, and that an upgrade of Arkham Origins can also let the player acquire 5 more Speed. Each suit also has a certain perk, such as more fire defense, poison defense, or basic attack defense, or (in the case of all the Arkham Origins suits) simply upgrading Batman's natural abilities.

In addition to the main missions, the game includes Most Wanted missions, some of which feature boss battles against notorious villains like those seen in the main campaign. There are also "Ambush" missions, which appear at random moments, are unskippable, and can only be replayed if completed successfully.

In game screenshot of Batman: Arkham Origins Mobile showing the mission selection screen

== Synopsis ==
Arkham Origins Mobile features the same premise as its console and PC counterpart. Set eight years before the events of 2009's Batman: Arkham Asylum, the story follows a younger and less refined Batman (Roger Craig Smith), a vigilante fighting crime in Gotham City, who has yet to establish himself as the city's protector and is hunted by the police and criminals alike. Due to his mistrust in others, Batman is aided in his quest for justice only by his loyal butler Alfred Pennyworth (Martin Jarvis), who provides him with intelligence and tech support. On Christmas Eve, a bounty is placed on Batman's head by crime lord Black Mask, drawing eight of the world's greatest assassins to Gotham (although only five of them—Bane (JB Blanc), Deathstroke (Mark Rolston), Deadshot (Chris Cox), Copperhead (Rosa Salazar), and Electrocutioner (Steven Blum)—are featured outside the opening cutscene). Batman must bring Black Mask to justice while contending with each assassin sent after him, and stopping additional crimes around Gotham.

Most of the game takes place across four different districts of Gotham: Downtown Gotham, the Industrial District, Uptown Gotham, and The Docks. Like Batman: Arkham City Lockdown, the game does not offer players the ability to roam the environment freely; instead, each district features its own set of missions and boss encounters. At the beginning of the game, players only have access to Downton Gotham, with the other three areas becoming available as the player completes main missions and defeats bosses in each district.

== Development ==
In October 2013, at New York Comic Con, it was revealed that a version of Batman: Arkham Origins for iOS and Android was being developed by NetherRealm Studios, who also created Arkham City Lockdown. Ed Boon serves as Arkham Origins' creative director. The mobile version can be connected to the console and PC version to unlock exclusive content, such as the Red Son Batman suit, for use in both versions. Exclusive Batman skins for the mobile version include designs from JSA: The Liberty Files, Batman Beyond, Blackest Night, and Injustice: Gods Among Us.

== Reception ==
Reception

Aggregate score
Aggregator	Score
Metacritic	63/100

Review scores
Publication	Score
Pocket Gamer	3/5
TouchArcade	2.5/5

Batman: Arkham Origins received "mixed or average" reviews, according to review aggregator Metacritic.

Pocket Gamer and TouchArcade praised Arkham Origins' graphics but stated that the title lacked depth, lamenting its freemium structure that required grinding from the player.
