= Injustice (franchise) =

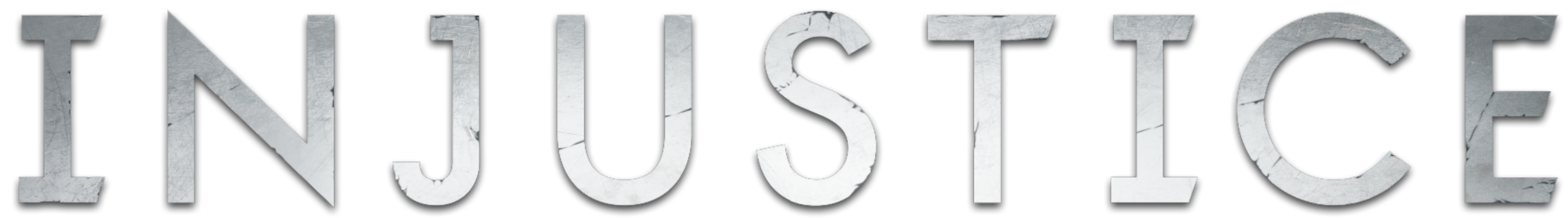
- Genre: Fighting
- Developer: NetherRealm Studios
- Publisher: Warner Bros. Interactive Entertainment
- Producers: Andrew Stein; Adam Urbano; Hans P. Lo
- Artist: Steve Beran
- Writers: Brian Chard; Dominic Cianciolo; John Vogel; Jon Greenberg; Shawn Kittelsen
- Composers: Christopher Drake; Dean Grinsfelder; Cris Velasco; Sascha Dikiciyan
- Platforms: PlayStation 3; Wii U; Xbox 360; Microsoft Windows; PlayStation 4; PlayStation Vita; iOS; Android; Xbox One; Arcade
- First release: Injustice: Gods Among Us; April 16, 2013
- Latest release: Injustice 2: Legendary Edition; March 27, 2018

Injustice is a series of crossover superhero fighting video games developed by NetherRealm Studios and published by Warner Bros. Interactive Entertainment, featuring characters created by DC Comics. The games were directed by Mortal Kombat creator and industry veteran Ed Boon, whose team had previously developed Mortal Kombat vs. DC Universe for Midway Games, and written by Brian Chard, Dominic Cianciolo, John Vogel and Jon Greenberg. The series features the voice talents of Kevin Conroy, George Newbern, Susan Eisenberg, Phil LaMarr, Alan Tudyk, Grey Griffin, Fred Tatasciore, Tara Strong, Khary Payton and Richard Epcar, reprising their roles from various DC Comics media.

The series' plot and premise take place within an alternate reality to the main DC Universe continuity, where Superman becomes a tyrant and establishes a new world order after the Joker tricks him into killing Lois Lane and destroying Metropolis with a nuclear bomb, causing Batman to form an insurgency in an effort to stop his regime. The first game, Injustice: Gods Among Us (2013), focuses on Batman receiving aid from alternate universe counterparts of the Justice League, who join his insurgency and help end Superman's regime. The second game, Injustice 2 (2017), is set five years later and follows Batman's insurgency rebuilding society after Superman's fall while dealing with the Society of Super Villains led by Gorilla Grodd and the alien invader Brainiac, which forces Batman to consider freeing Superman to help combat the threats.

Outside the video games, the Injustice franchise also comprises two comic book series and an animated film adaptation. The first comic series, Injustice: Gods Among Us, ran from January 2013 to September 2016 and serves as a prequel to the original game, exploring the events that led to the establishment of both the Insurgency and the One Earth Regime. The second series, Injustice 2, ran from April 2017 to October 2018 and bridges the gap between the two games, depicting the aftermath of the Regime's fall and the emergence of new villains who seek to fill the power vacuum. The animated film, titled Injustice, was released in October 2021 and features an original narrative that borrows elements from both the first game and its prequel comic.

== Games ==
Title	Year	Platform(s)								
Title	Year	PS3	PS4	PS Vita	Wii U	Win	X360	XOne	Android	iOS
Injustice: Gods Among Us	2013	Yes	Yes	Yes	Yes	Yes	Yes	Yes	Yes	Yes
Injustice 2	2017	No	Yes	No	No	Yes	No	Yes	Yes	Yes

=== Injustice: Gods Among Us ===
In the first game of the series, set in an alternate reality from the main DC Universe, Superman is driven over the edge after the Joker tricks him into killing Lois Lane and destroying Metropolis with a nuclear bomb. Joined by other heroes and villains, he establishes the One Earth Regime to bring about a new world order and enforce global peace. In an effort to overthrow the corrupted Superman, Batman forms an underground insurgency and summons counterparts of the Justice League from another universe to defeat the Regime.

=== Injustice 2 ===
Injustice 2 is the sequel to Injustice: Gods Among Us, set five years after the events of the first game and featuring a larger cast of characters. In the aftermath of the One Earth Regime's fall, Batman and his Insurgency attempt to rebuild society while dealing with a Society of Super Villains led by Gorilla Grodd and a collector of worlds called Brainiac. Overwhelmed by the new threats, Batman is forced to consider freeing the imprisoned Superman to help combat the villains.

== Characters ==
List indicator
- A light grey cell indicates the character was not in the video game or the animated film.

Characters	Video games		Animated film
Characters	Injustice: Gods Among Us	Injustice 2	Injustice
Characters	2013	2017	2021
Characters	=== Story characters ===		
Batman Bruce Thomas Wayne	Kevin Conroy	Kevin Conroy	Anson Mount
Superman Kal-El / Clark Joseph Kent	George Newbern	George Newbern	Justin Hartley
Cyborg Victor "Vic" Stone	Khary Payton	Khary Payton	Brandon Micheal Hall
The Joker	Richard Epcar	Richard Epcar	Kevin Pollak
Wonder Woman Princess Diana of Themyscira / Diana Prince	Susan Eisenberg	Susan Eisenberg	Janet Varney
Green Arrow Oliver Queen	Alan Tudyk	Alan Tudyk	Reid Scott
Catwoman Selina Kyle	Grey Griffin	Grey Griffin	Anika Noni Rose
Harley Quinn Harleen Quinzel	Tara Strong	Tara Strong	Gillian Jacobs
Bane	Fred Tatasciore	Fred Tatasciore	N/A
Black Adam Teth-Adam	Joey Naber	Joey Naber	
Aquaman King Orin / Arthur Joseph Curry	Phil LaMarr	Phil LaMarr	Derek Phillips
Green Lantern Hal Jordan	Adam Baldwin	Steve Blum	Brian T. Delaney
The Flash Barry Allen	Neal McDonough	Taliesin Jaffe	Yuri Lowenthal
Robin/Nightwing II Damian Wayne	Neal McDonough	Scott Porter	Zach Callison
Nightwing/Deadwing Dick Grayson	Troy Baker		Derek Phillips
Thaal Sinestro	Troy Baker		
Hawkgirl Shayera Hol (née Thal) / Shiera Sanders-Hall	Jennifer Hale		
Killer Frost Louise Lincoln	Jennifer Hale		Cameo
Deathstroke Slade Wilson	J. G. Hertzler		
Ares	J. G. Hertzler		
Doomsday	Khary Payton		Hallucination
Lex Luthor	Mark Rolston		
Raven Rachel Roth	Tara Strong		N/A
Shazam Billy Batson	Joey Naber		Yuri Lowenthal
Solomon Grundy Cyrus Gold	Fred Tatasciore		N/A
Brainiac Vril Dox		Jeffrey Combs	
Gorilla Grodd		Charles Halford	
Atrocitus		Ike Amadi	
Firestorm Jason Rusch		Ogie Banks	
Black Canary Dinah Lance		Vanessa Marshall	
Scarecrow Jonathan Crane		Robert Englund	Cameo
Captain Cold Leonard Snart		C. Thomas Howell	Cameo
Cheetah Barbara Ann Minerva		Erica Luttrell	Cameo
Deadshot Floyd Lawton		Matthew Mercer	Cameo
Doctor Fate Kent Nelson		David Sobolov	
Blue Beetle Jaime Reyes		Antony Del Rio	
Poison Ivy Pamela Isley		Tasia Valenza	N/A
Supergirl Kara Zor-El / Kara Danvers		Laura Bailey	
Swamp Thing Alec Holland		Fred Tatasciore	
=== DLC characters ===
Batgirl Barbara Gordon	Kimberly Brooks		
Martian Manhunter J'onn J'onzz	Carl Lumbly		
Lobo	David Sobolov		
Zod	Nolan North		
Zatanna Zatanna Zatara	Lacey Chabert		
Darkseid Uxas		Michael-Leon Wooley	
Red Hood Jason Todd		Cameron Bowen	
Starfire Koriand'r		Kari Wahlgren	
Black Manta David Hyde		Kane Jungbluth-Murry	
Atom Ryan Choi		Matthew Yang King	N/A
Enchantress June Moone		Brandy Kopp	Cameo
=== Guest characters ===
Scorpion Hanzo Hasashi	Patrick Seitz		
Sub-Zero Kuai Liang		Steve Blum	
Raiden		Richard Epcar	
Hellboy Anung Un Rama		Bruce Barker	
Leonardo		Corey Krueger	
Raphael		Ben Rausch	
Donatello		Joe Brogie	
Michelangelo		Ryan Cooper	
=== Premiere skins ===
Arrow Oliver Queen	Stephen Amell		
Green Lantern John Stewart	Phil LaMarr	Phil LaMarr	
Grid		Khary Payton	
Reverse-Flash Eobard Thawne		Liam O'Brien	Cameo
Power Girl Karen Starr		Sara Cravens	
Mr. Freeze Victor Fries		Jim Pirri	
Vixen Mari McCabe		Megalyn Echikunwoke	
Flash Jay Garrick		Travis Willingham	
Black Lightning Jefferson Pierce		Kane Jungbluth-Murry	
Bizarro El-Kal / Kent Clark		Patrick Seitz	
=== Non-playable characters ===
Brother Eye		David Loefell	
Lucius Fox		Phil LaMarr	
Doctor Randall		Tara Strong	
Alura In-Ze		Grey Griffin	
Victor Zsasz		Steve Blum	Reid Scott
Martin Stein		Fred Tatasciore	
Brainiac 5 Querl Dox		Liam O'Brien	
=== Film characters ===
Lois Lane			Laura Bailey
Rama Kushna			Laura Bailey
Jimmy Olsen			Zach Calison
Captain Atom Nathaniel Adams			Fred Tatasciore
Mirror Master Evan McCulloch			Yuri Lowenthal
Ra's al Ghul			Faran Tahir
Jonathan Kent			Kevin Pollak
President of the United States			Kevin Pollak
Killer Croc Waylon Jones			Edwin Hodge
Mister Terrific Michael Holt			Edwin Hodge
Plastic Man Patrick "Eel" O'Brian			Oliver Hudson
Mirror Master Soldier			Andrew Morgado
Huntress Helena Bertinelli			N/A
Hawkman Katar Hol / Carter Hall			N/A
Clayface Basil Karlo			N/A
Amazo			N/A
Calendar Man Julian Day			N/A
Perry White			Cameo
Weather Wizard Mark Mardon			Cameo
Trickster Axel Walker			Cameo
Plastique Bette Sans Souci			Cameo
Riddler Edward Nigma			Cameo
Two-Face Harvey Dent			Cameo
Mad Hatter Jervis Tetch			Cameo
Mantis			Cameo
Captain Boomerang George "Digger" Harkness			Cameo
Giganta Doris Zeul			Cameo
Catman Thomas Blake			Cameo
Pied Piper Harley Rathaway			Cameo
Turtle			Cameo
Man-Bat Kirk Langstrom			Cameo
Ron Troupe			Cameo

== Other media ==
=== Comics ===
The Injustice: Gods Among Us comic book series serves as a prequel detailing the events leading up to the game, as well as those that happen in the interregnum between Superman's murder of the Joker and the discovery of the primary universe. The series was first written by Tom Taylor and illustrated by a number of artists, including Jheremy Raapack, Mike S. Miller, Bruno Redondo, Tom Derenick, and others. The comic was released digitally beginning on January 15, 2013. The series was later issued in regular comic book form, and eventually a collected edition. Tom Taylor left the series after writing Injustice: Year Three #14, with Brian Buccellato replacing him by continuing the story into Year Four and Five. The final chapter of the series was released in September 2016, leaving the story incomplete; another comic book series, titled Injustice: Ground Zero, followed afterwards, which picked up the story and concluded the retelling of the game's events from Harley Quinn's perspective.

The Injustice 2 comic book series serves as a prequel to the events of the game. The series was written by Tom Taylor, who had previously worked on the tie-in comic books for Injustice: Gods Among Us. Bruno Redondo served as lead artist, with contributing artwork from Juan Albarran, Daniel Sempere, and Mike S. Miller. Beginning on April 11, 2017, the series was released in weekly chapters through various digital retailers, including ComiXology, Google Play Books, the Kindle Store, and DC Comics' own mobile app. Print versions became available for purchase the following month on May 3, each containing multiple digital chapters.

A miniseries known as Injustice vs. Masters of the Universe, featuring a crossover with Mattel's Masters of the Universe franchise, was first published on July 18, 2018, by DC Comics. It is written by Tim Seeley with art by Freddie Williams II, and follows the second game's alternate ending, where Superman wins out over Batman. After killing Brainiac and combining himself with his ship, Superman has used Brainiac's technology to turn Batman into the Black Oracle, who can predict crimes before they happen. Damian Wayne, now an adult, teams up with Cyborg and seeks the help of the Masters of the Universe to stop Superman for good. Damian manages to free Batman from Superman's control but is killed by Wonder Woman for his betrayal, which triggers Batman's release from Superman's programming. After Darkseid and Skeletor's forces invade both Earth and Eternia, the two groups of heroes need to cooperate to save their respective worlds.

The universe of Injustice returned in the Dawn of DC miniseries Adventures of Superman: Jon Kent, written by the original Injustice writer Tom Taylor.

=== Film ===
An animated Injustice film was released on October 19, 2021, as part of the DC Universe Animated Original Movies line. It is a loose adaptation of the Year One comic series, featuring a different voice cast from the video games. The film was released in both digital and physical formats.

== Reception ==
Aggregate review scores As of July 12, 2017.
Game	Metacritic
Injustice: Gods Among Us	(WIIU) 82/100 (X360) 81/100 (PS4) 80/100 (PC) 79/100 (PS3) 78/100 (iOS) 69/100
Injustice 2	87/100 (PS4); 88/100 (XONE)

The series has been a critical and commercial success, with praise going to its story, gameplay mechanics, presentation, abundance of in-game content, character customization options, and use of the DC Comics license.

The animated Injustice film received mixed reviews. On the review aggregator website Rotten Tomatoes, 50% of 6 critics' reviews are positive, with an average rating of 5.60/10. Criticism was leveled at the plot, unceremonious character deaths, poor character development, pacing, and unfaithfulness to the source material. Some reviewers, however, praised the voice acting, action sequences, and animation.

== See also ==
- Kingdom Come: A 1996 comic book featuring a similar premise to the Injustice series, such as the Joker killing Lois Lane, and Superman and Batman forming opposing factions of superheroes.
- Mortal Kombat vs. DC Universe: A 2008 video game developed by Midway Games, with similar gameplay, aesthetics, and many of the same characters as the Injustice games, which it helped inspire.
