= Calendar Man =

Comic book character

- Calendar Man in Batman: The Long Halloween. Art by Tim Sale

Publication information
- Publisher: DC Comics
- First appearance: Detective Comics #259 (September 1958)
- Created by: Bill Finger (writer); Sheldon Moldoff (artist)

In-story information
- Alter ego: Julian Gregory Day
- Species: Human
- Team affiliations: The Misfits; Time Foes
- Notable aliases: Calendar Killer
- Abilities: Inventor of gadgets and machines; Ages and rejuvenates according to season

Calendar Man (Julian Gregory Day) is a supervillain appearing in American comic books published by DC Comics, as an enemy of the superhero Batman, belonging to the collective of adversaries that make up Batman's rogues gallery. Calendar Man is known for committing crimes that correspond with holidays and significant dates. He often wears costumes to correlate with the date of the designated crime. His name is a reference to the Julian and Gregorian calendars. In his debut, the character was presented as a joke villain, but in later years, writers developed Calendar Man as a dark, disturbed criminal who toys with Batman.

Calendar Man appeared in Batman: The Brave and the Bold, where he was voiced by Jim Piddock, and the Batman: Arkham series, where he was voiced by Maurice LaMarche. The character made his live-action debut in the DC Extended Universe film The Suicide Squad, portrayed by Sean Gunn.

== Publication history ==
Calendar Man first appeared in Detective Comics #259 (September 1958) and was created by Bill Finger and Sheldon Moldoff. He returned after twenty years to plague Batman again in Batman #312 (June 1979).

== Fictional character biography ==
=== Criminal career ===
Calendar Man is fascinated by dates and calendars, due to an obsession with important dates and trauma surrounding important holidays. His crimes always have a relationship to the date that they are committed. The theme may be related to what day of the week it is or to a holiday or to a special anniversary on that date; he will plan his crime around that day. He often wears different costumes which correspond to the significance of the date, though he does have a main costume which has various numbers (meant to represent days on a calendar) sprouting from the shoulders.

He next appears in Batman #312 (June 1979), in which his crimes are based on the days of the week, and his costumes reflect the gods they were named for. Calendar Man fires an ultrasonic sound weapon at Batman, nearly killing him. While Batman recuperates, Calendar Man commits crimes on Friday and Saturday. He plans to leave Gotham City on a train called the Western Sun Express on Sunday—the traditional "day of rest"—knowing that the police would be waiting for him to attempt to steal an artifact of the Egyptian god of the Sun, Ra. Batman captures him at the train station before he boards.

This issue also marked the first appearance of his most commonly known "calendar cape" costume. His next appearance in Batman #384–385 (June–July 1985) and Detective Comics #551 (June 1985), sees the Calendar Man at the onset of the Crisis being used as a pawn of the Monitor in an attempt to find an assassin to eliminate Batman. In this instance, the Calendar Man's theme is holidays, and he attempts to use the young Jason Todd, as Robin, as the Batman's Achilles' heel, with the promise of his demise on the first day of Spring. Ultimately, however, Robin himself captures the villain.

His best-known modern appearance is in the miniseries Batman: The Long Halloween, where he is portrayed as a Hannibal Lecter-like figure, offering insight in Batman's search for Holiday, a holiday-themed serial killer. Like Lecter in the novels of Thomas Harris, Calendar Man knows who the killer is and keeps this information to himself, choosing instead to taunt the heroes with cryptic clues. He returns in that story's sequel, Batman: Dark Victory, in which he impersonates deceased mobster Carmine Falcone in an effort to drive his children, Alberto and Mario, insane. When Calendar Man (as Carmine) tries to get Alberto to kill himself, however, the younger Falcone detects the ruse; Alberto knows that his father abhorred suicide, and thus figures out that Calendar Man is manipulating him. At the end of the story arc, Falcone's daughter Sofia Falcone Gigante beats him to a pulp as revenge for his role in her father's death. In both stories, Calendar Man is bitter that the new murderous rogues have taken the attention off him; he fears that he is being forgotten.

Calendar Man teams up with Catman and Killer Moth as part of The Misfits, a group of villains trying to prove themselves in Batman: Shadow of the Bat #7–9 (1992–1993). Also, he is among the Arkham Asylum inmates freed by Bane in Batman: Knightfall, but he is easily recaptured by Power Girl shortly after his escape. Calendar Man appears in "All the Deadly Days", a story in 80 Page Giant Batman Special Edition #3 (July 2000), in which he has acquired a new high-tech costume, and moves up to more grandiose crimes.

=== The New 52 ===
In 2011, DC rebooted their continuity. In this universe, Julian Day is a mob enforcer for the criminal Squid. While he is popular among his colleagues for his brute strength, he abuses and neglects his young child, Aden. However, when Batman goes looking for weaponry being sold by Squid, he encounters Aden, who tells him his father’s location. Batman assumes the persona of Matches Malone and goes looking for Julian. Julian, meanwhile, finally decides he should pay his child some attention and plans to get a calendar, but Batman forces him into a bathroom and punches him into some tiles. The tiles create a calendar-like scar around his head.

=== DC Rebirth ===
In DC Rebirth, Calendar Man is a permanent inmate of Arkham Asylum. When Batman hides Psycho-Pirate in Arkham, Bane comes for him and confronts Calendar Man. Instead of fighting him, Calendar Man states that everything is a loop and that he cannot win.

== Powers and abilities ==
Calendar Man is a successful inventor, capable of designing the machinery needed to deploy his various schemes. His talents aid him as he pursues his obsession with quirks of the calendar, carefully planning and theming his crimes around holidays, weekdays and the seasons. Calendar Man is also an experienced hand-to-hand combatant, although his main reason for his success is his intelligence. In his latest incarnation, as written by Scott Snyder and Tom King in the pages of the Batman Rebirth special (June 2016), the Calendar Man now ages with the seasonal weather of Gotham City. Every spring he is reborn, with his DNA altered, but retains his memories, and then ages rapidly until winter when he dies, only to be reborn again the next spring by crawling from the husk of his own corpse.

== In other media ==
=== Television ===
Calendar Girl in The New Batman Adventures, in her spring outfit

- A character based on Calendar Man named Calendar Girl (Page Monroe) appears in The New Batman Adventures episode "Mean Seasons", voiced by Sela Ward. A former supermodel, she was fired after turning 30, leading her to develop body dysmorphic disorder and wearing a mask under the belief that she is hideous despite her normal appearance. Additionally, she plans her crimes around the four seasons, with a different costume and weapons corresponding to each.
- Calendar Man appears in Batman: The Brave and the Bold, voiced by Jim Piddock.
- Calendar Man was discussed to appear in Gotham, though this never came to pass.
- Calendar Man appears in Harley Quinn, voiced by Alan Tudyk. This version is married, the father of a young boy, and a member of the Legion of Doom.
- Calendar Man appears in Batman: Caped Crusader, voiced by J. P. Karliak. This version is the accountant of Rupert Thorne.

=== Film ===
- Calendar Man makes a non-speaking cameo appearance in The Batman vs. Dracula.
- Calendar Man makes a non-speaking appearance in The Lego Batman Movie.
- Calendar Man appears in Batman: The Long Halloween, voiced by David Dastmalchian.
- Calendar Man makes a non-speaking cameo appearance in Injustice.
- Calendar Man makes a cameo appearance in The Suicide Squad, portrayed by Sean Gunn. This version is an inmate of Belle Reve penitentiary.

=== Video games ===
- Calendar Man appears in Batman: Arkham City, voiced by Maurice LaMarche. This version is obese, has a slightly shorter right leg, forcing him to wear a brace and platform shoe, and sports calendar-like scars on his head. After being imprisoned in the eponymous Arkham City mega-prison, he occupied the Solomon Wayne Courthouse, trapping anyone who entered and killing them on the next holiday before Two-Face and his gang seized the courthouse and locked Calendar Man in a glass cell in the basement. After defeating Two-Face, Batman can speak to Calendar Man. If the player speaks with him on New Year's Day, Valentine's Day, Saint Patrick's Day, April Fools' Day, Mother's Day, Father's Day, Independence Day, the Feast Day of Saint Roch, Labor Day, Halloween, Thanksgiving, and Christmas Day, Calendar Man will relate a story about a crime he committed on that specific day. If the player returns to the courthouse after hearing all twelve stories, Calendar Man will have escaped, leaving one of Two-Face's henchmen hanging from the ceiling of his cell. If the player sets the date of the gaming console to December 13, 2004 (the date Arkham developer Rocksteady Studios was founded) and visits Calendar Man, he will speak about his origins with Batman, concluding with "I was there at your beginning, and I will be there at your end." If the player visits Calendar Man as Catwoman, he will bring up an incident involving both her and the Falcone family and imply that Carmine Falcone might be her father.
- Calendar Man appears as a character summon in Scribblenauts Unmasked: A DC Comics Adventure.
- Calendar Man makes a minor appearance in Batman: Arkham Origins. While disguised as Black Mask, the Joker launches a siege on Blackgate Penitentiary on Christmas Eve, during which he frees Calendar Man in appreciation of the act of doing so on a holiday.
- Calendar Man makes a cameo appearance in Batman: Arkham Knight, witnessing the destruction of Wayne Manor.
- Calendar Man appears as an unlockable playable character in Lego DC Super-Villains, voiced by Jim Pirri. This version is a member of the Legion of Doom.
- Calendar Man makes a cameo appearance as a non-player character (NPC) in Lego Batman: Legacy of the Dark Knight.

=== Miscellaneous ===
- An older, wheelchair-using Calendar Man appears in the Batman Beyond (vol. 2) arc "Hush Beyond". He attempts to kill Commissioner Barbara Gordon, but is thwarted and killed by Hush.
- Calendar Man appears in issue #12 of the Batman: The Brave and the Bold tie-in comic.
- Calendar Man makes a minor appearance in the Injustice: Gods Among Us prequel comic as an inmate of Arkham Asylum.
- The Batman: Arkham incarnation of Calendar Man appears in the Batman: Arkham Knight prequel comic.
- Calendar Man appears in the Injustice 2 prequel comic as a member of the Suicide Squad.

== See also ==
- List of Batman family enemies
