= WWE Immortals =

Discontinued mobile game

- Game poster featuring Brock Lesnar, The Rock and John Cena in their Immortal forms
- Developers: NetherRealm Studios; Phosphor Game Studios
- Publisher: Warner Bros. Interactive Entertainment
- Producer: Fuzzy Gerdes
- Designers: Adam Coriglione; Travis Hernandez; Mike Lee
- Programmers: Peter Bennett; Anthony J. Rod
- Engine: Unreal Engine 3
- Platforms: Android iOS
- Release: January 15, 2015
- Genre: Fighting

WWE Immortals was a fighting game based on the professional wrestling promotion WWE. It was released on January 15, 2015, for Android and iOS. The game was developed by NetherRealm Studios in conjunction with Phosphor Game Studios and published by Warner Bros. Interactive Entertainment. The game was free on both app stores. On February 28, 2019, the game was shut down and no longer sold in-app purchases as of December 31, 2018.

== Gameplay ==
WWE Immortals was a fighting game that took the athletes of the WWE into a reality, their gimmicks, and makes them fantasy heroes. It appeared to be based on WWE Brawl, a cancelled fighting game by THQ. The development team described it as "a free-to-play mobile game that would feature epic Superstar battles in a fantastically re-imagined WWE world." The game borrowed many technical elements from the mobile version of Injustice: Gods Among Us including graphics and sound, as well as the three vs. three combat format. In addition, "Immortal Credits" were earned through gameplay and used to buy and upgrade characters. At launch, there were 25 purchasable heroes in the game, nine bronze, nine silver and seven gold including Undertaker, Kane etc., with the addition of the gold Cyborg Brock Lesnar unlocked via a challenge mode expiring on January 31, 2015. The game offered Battle matches, with seven matches that revolved around a certain Immortal character, and offered a Challenge match once the initial battle matches were complete. Once the main character boss was beaten, the player could move onto another Battle match, with each set of matches getting progressively more difficult. The Battle matches could be revisited once completed for more experience points and Immortal credits.

Immortals' stats grew in levels, and each Immortal was armed with quick and powerful regular attacks, blocking, and three signature attacks (two regular and a Finisher). Immortals could go up to level 50, and could also be upgraded to Legendary status if the player owned another card copy of the character (all way up to Legendary Level VII); this allowed, for example, a Bronze character of high Legendary status to be able to fight equally against lower leveled Silver and even Gold Characters.

=== Credits ===
Immortal credits were earned in matches for players to spend and level up their Immortals' signature and Finisher attacks, buy other characters, or buy talent cards to strengthen their characters. Various booster packs which contained characters, free upgrades, talent cards, and packs containing Gear cards were also bought with credits.

=== Gear ===
Gear cards offered a wide range of upgrades that increased basic damage, additional damage to signatures, etc., and extra Gear cards could be scrapped for materials to make a Gear card even more powerful and even evolve into another type of Gear that could be further upgraded with materials. Each character had their own special Gear card that specifically enhanced their powers, though its other benefits could still be used when attached on other characters.

=== Challenge Stages ===
After the Challenge Stage to earn Cyborg Brock Lesnar, the company (Warner Bros. International Enterprises) offered more Challenge stages for more special Gold characters (such as Skull King Triple H, Evolved Paige, Rogue John Cena, Lunatic Fringe Dean Ambrose, Xavier Woods Raiden, Mortal Kombat or A-List Johnny Cage), where five tiers of challenges must be completed in order to gain that special Gold character. These Challenge stages became weekly events, and required tokens to complete the matches in each challenge tier, which were obtained in the Battle matches offered and in online matches. These Challenge stages had three modes that were available during the given week and had to be completed before moving onto the next mode, and got progressively more difficult but earned higher rewards: Regular mode, which awarded the featured Gold character offered; Expert mode, which awarded another copy of the featured character and an Uncommon Gear card; and Nightmare mode, which awarded yet another copy of the featured character and a Gear card associated with that character.

=== Online Play ===
The game also featured online competitive battling, where players went online to challenge with their Immortals against other players' Immortals for prizes of Immortal Credits, special Gear cards (along with regular Gear cards), Challenge Stage tokens, and exclusive renditions of characters offered in these online tournaments (such as Gold Animal Batista, Voodoo Bray Wyatt, Sharpshooter Bret Hart, etc.). Players earned Battle Points (BP) to increase their tournament ranking by competing in three types of matches: Singles Match (one opponent), Show Match (3 opponents), and Main Event (5 opponents). Extra BP were also earned by completing Daily Quests. These matches may also reward players with Stamina cards (to re-energize their Immortals to fight again) and even Gear cards. For each pay-per-view event that WWE was broadcasting, a Gear card and ticket Gear card named after that event would be offered as a prize depending on a player's ranking at the end of the week.

=== Ladder Event and Platinum ===
On June 29, 2017, the game was updated to version 2.5. and introduced the Ladder Event and the brand-new Platinum pack and characters. Dark Lantern Bray Wyatt and Commando Sgt. Slaughter were the first two Platinum Immortals launched. Three levels offered a variety of challenges in order to earn "ladders" and were represented with one of WWE's championships: NXT Championship level (Easy challenges), WWE Cruiserweight Championship level (Intermediate challenges), and WWE Championship level (Hard challenges). Each level carried its own rewards when enough "ladders" were collected. A Platinum pack was the reward if enough ladders were obtained, and not each level of difficulty needed to be played to gain ladders (a player could continually play the NXT Championship level, for example). The pack could have been purchased in exchange for Platinum bars, which were obtained when a championship level that featured the bars as a prize.

=== Zombie Invasion ===
Immortals introduced a mode called "Zombie Invasion", which allowed players to gain Gold zombified versions of four WWE superstars: Brock Lesnar, AJ Styles, Stone Cold Steve Austin, and Seth Rollins. Players had to choose three of their Immortals to compete in a five-stage gauntlet match, with the first four stages featuring two Immortals and one of the zombie Immortals, and the fifth stage featuring three of the zombie Immortals. Damage the players' Immortals accumulated from the matches did not reset. After the final stage, players received Immortal credits and a Graveyard Pack containing stone letters that the player could put on the gravestones of the four zombie Immortals, and once a name was filled, the player would receive said Immortal to add to their collection. Unused letters were stored, and after receiving one of the zombie Immortals, the gravestone name reset to allow the player to fill in the name again for more copies of the Immortal. After a couple hours reset, the player could attempt the Zombie Invasion again with the stages getting progressively more difficult.

== Reception ==
Reception

Aggregate score
Aggregator	Score
Metacritic	72/100

Review scores
Publication	Score
GameRevolution	(AND) 7/10
Gamezebo	3.5/5
MeriStation	7.2/10
Pocket Gamer	4/5
TouchArcade	4/5
Forbes	(favorable)

The iOS version received "mixed or average reviews" according to the review aggregation website Metacritic.

GameRevolution rated WWE Immoortals 7/10, praising its renditions of WWE wrestlers and graphics, and saying the game "has more depth than you would expect from a free-to-play title." They critiqued the length of play sessions and pointed out some technical faults.

PocketGamer was a bit more favourable towards the game, giving it a 4/5 rating. They called the game "remarkably fun" and praised its graphics, polish, and overall design. TouchArcade also rated the game 4/5, complementing the gameplay, multiplayer features, and the Rivals and Allies system.

== See also ==
- List of licensed wrestling video games
- List of fighting games
