= Suicide Squad: Kill the Justice League =

2024 video game

Suicide Squad: Kill The Justice League
- Developer: Rocksteady Studios (Note: Additional work and development support by Sumo Digital, Unbroken Studios, WB Games New York, WB Games Montréal, Traveller's Tales, and Virtuos)
- Publisher: Warner Bros. Games
- Directors: Sefton Hill; Axel Rydby; Adam Doherty; Rasmus Hoejengaard
- Designer: Ian Ball
- Programmers: Chip Bell; Ben Wyatt
- Artist: David Hego
- Writers: Ben Schroder; Martin Lancaster; Grant Roberts; Sefton Hill; Ian Ball
- Composers: Nick Arundel; Rupert Cross
- Series: Batman: Arkham
- Engine: Unreal Engine 4
- Platforms: PlayStation 5; Windows; Xbox Series X/S
- Release: February 2, 2024 (Note: Those who pre-ordered the Deluxe Edition received early access to the game on January 30, 2024. The Epic Games Store version of the game was delayed to March 26, 2024.)
- Genres: Action-adventure, third-person shooter
- Modes: Single-player, multiplayer

Suicide Squad: Kill the Justice League is a 2024 action-adventure shooter game developed by Rocksteady Studios and published by Warner Bros. Games. Based on the DC Comics team the Suicide Squad, it is a spin-off of the Batman: Arkham series and a follow-up to Batman: Arkham Knight (2015). Set five years after the events of Arkham Knight, the game's storyline follows the titular supervillain team, who are assembled by Amanda Waller and sent to Metropolis to stop the alien invader Brainiac and kill the members of the Justice League who have been brainwashed by him. The game is presented from a third-person perspective, and its open world design allows players, either individually or cooperatively, to freely roam Metropolis.

The game was announced in August 2020 and was scheduled to release in 2022, but was delayed multiple times. It had an early access period for owners of the deluxe edition that began on January 29, 2024, before releasing worldwide on February 2 for the PlayStation 5, Windows, and Xbox Series X/S. The game received mixed reviews from critics, who praised its narrative and gameplay, but criticized its repetition and live service elements. Kill the Justice League failed to meet the sales expectations of Warner Bros. Games. Rocksteady ended support for the game in January 2025 following the final post-launch story update.

== Gameplay ==
Suicide Squad: Kill the Justice League is an action-adventure game set in an open world based in Metropolis. Players control the Suicide Squad, which features a total of eight playable characters, including the four initial members, Deadshot, Harley Quinn, Captain Boomerang, and King Shark, and the post-launch additions of the Joker, Mrs. Freeze, Lawless, and Deathstroke. While it can be played solo, the game features a four-player cooperative multiplayer mode. When played solo, players can switch between characters at will, while the other characters are controlled by the game's AI.

Each character has access to three weapon classes, with each class being shared by multiple characters. Each character has a unique melee combat style and traversal method, such as Harley Quinn who uses a bludgeon and travels using Batman's grapple gun. A skill tree progression system is included, allowing players to re-spec into different skills at any point throughout the game for different build experimentation. Post-launch content was released in the form of "seasons", with frequent free content updates featuring new locations, activities and playable characters.

== Synopsis ==
=== Setting and characters ===
Suicide Squad: Kill the Justice League is set in the Batman: Arkham universe, five years after the events of Batman: Arkham Knight (2015). The game centers around the Suicide Squad, which is initially composed of Arkham Asylum inmates Dr. Harleen Quinzel / Harley Quinn (Tara Strong), George "Digger" Harkness / Captain Boomerang (Daniel Lapaine), Floyd Lawton / Deadshot (Note: This version of Deadshot is African-American, who also claims that the Deadshot who appeared in previous Batman: Arkham games was an imposter. In-game dialogue suggests the previous Deadshot is a multiversal variant.) (Bumper Robinson), and Belle Reve prisoner Prince Nanaue / King Shark (Joe Seanoa), created by A.R.G.U.S. director Amanda Waller (Debra Wilson). The main antagonist takes the form of Vril Dox / Brainiac (Jason Isaacs), a highly intelligent alien who has invaded Earth and brainwashed its inhabitants, including Justice League members Kal-El / Clark Kent / Superman (Nolan North), Barry Allen / The Flash (Scott Porter), John Stewart / Green Lantern (Dan White), and Bruce Wayne / Batman (Kevin Conroy).

Major supporting characters in the game include Princess Diana of Themyscira / Wonder Woman (Zehra Fazal), the only member of the Justice League not under Brainiac's control; Colonel Rick Flag Jr. (Jim Pirri), an A.R.G.U.S. operative working for Waller; Lex Luthor (Corey Burton), a megalomaniacal billionaire and Superman's arch-nemesis; Lois Lane (Seychelle Gabriel), a Metropolis news reporter working for the Daily Planet; Aaron Cash (Duane R. Shepard Sr.), an Arkham Asylum guard; Edward Nigma / The Riddler (Wally Wingert), a narcissistic supervillain who challenges the Squad with completing various puzzles across the city; Oswald Cobblepot / The Penguin (Nolan North), a Gotham City crime lord and weapons dealer who supplies the Squad with anti-metahuman weaponry; Mikron O'Jeneus / Gizmo (Rick Pasqualone), a vehicle expert who develops various means of transportation for the Squad; Zalika / Hack (Omono Okojie), a technomancer who monitors the Squad's neck bombs and provides them upgrades; Hiro Okamura / The Toyman (Christopher Sean), a mechanical genius who idolizes the Justice League; and Pamela Isley / Poison Ivy (Darcy Rose Byrnes), a reincarnated version of the plant-controlling supervillain who died during the events of Arkham Knight with no memories of her past life.

Other characters featured in the game are Kamo / Chondrakha (Andrew Morgado), a shark god who is King Shark's father; A.R.G.U.S. agents Taki Matsuda (Anne Yatco), Flynn Russell (Camrus Johnson), Marcus Lo (Daisuke Tsuji), and Tianna Cortez (Krizia Bajos); Sydney Happersen (Dave B. Mitchell), a LexCorp scientist who was Lex Luthor's assistant; and Jack Ryder (James Horan), a famous Gotham City reporter who helped to create "The Batman Experience".

Post-launch seasons feature the additions of four playable Squad members: the Joker (J. P. Karliak), a multiversal variant of Batman's deceased arch-nemesis; Dr. Victoria Frias / Mrs. Freeze (Erika Ishii), a multiversal variant of Dr. Victor Fries / Mr. Freeze; Zoe Lawton / Lawless (Marley Soleil), Deadshot's daughter who has taken on a master thief persona in his absence; and Slade Wilson / Deathstroke (Glenn Wrage), a formidable assassin working for A.R.G.U.S.

=== Plot ===
Arkham Asylum inmates Deadshot, Captain Boomerang, Harley Quinn, and Belle Reve prisoner King Shark are freed from captivity by A.R.G.U.S. director Amanda Waller and are forced to join her Task Force X, the "Suicide Squad". After miniature bombs are injected into their heads, Waller sends the squad into Metropolis which is under attack by Brainiac. When they raid the Hall of Justice, a brainwashed Green Lantern attacks them and explains that Brainiac plans to xenoform Earth. The Flash intervenes to rescue the squad but is gravely wounded and captured by a brainwashed Batman. The squad retreats to the Hall of Justice and encounters Wonder Woman, the only other member of the Justice League who was not brainwashed. She refuses to work with them as Waller orders the squad to kill the Justice League and end their threat.

Waller has the squad scour Metropolis for weapons and technology that can be used against the Justice League, as well as forcibly recruiting other villains into their ranks. They attempt to apprehend Lex Luthor to obtain his knowledge, but he is killed by a now-brainwashed Flash; the squad narrowly escape thanks to Wonder Woman's intervention. She subdues the Flash to find a way to stop Brainiac, with him replying that the only way is to kill her friends. The squad is supplied with anti-Speed Force technology, which they use to kill the Flash. Green Lantern arrives and forces the squad to flee through one of Brainiac's portals. The squad finds themselves transported to Earth-2, an alternate Earth that has already been destroyed by Brainiac. They meet an alternate version of Luthor, nicknamed Lex-2, who reveals that he had been collaborating with his Earth-1 counterpart to prepare for Brainiac's invasion.

Lex-2 transports the squad back to their dimension and warns that Waller will have them killed as her Earth-2 version did to her own squad. The squad breaks into Wayne Enterprises' secret bank vault, where they find Wonder Woman crafting a Kryptonite-based shield. After she leaves, Lex-2 secures Yellow Lantern batteries that Batman was keeping as a contingency against Green Lantern and gives them to the squad. He reveals that Waller has no intention of granting the squad their freedom, either letting them get killed or otherwise using Brainiac's mind-control technology on them. The squad confronts and kills Green Lantern, temporarily disabling a shield protecting Brainiac's ship. Waller attempts to call a nuclear strike on Brainiac, willing to sacrifice the squad, but a brainwashed Superman thwarts her plans.

Wonder Woman and Superman battle each other as the squad attempts to escort Waller to safety inside the Hall of Justice. Wonder Woman stabs Superman with a shard of Kryptonite, but he survives and kills her before retreating to Brainiac's ship. Lex-2 theorizes that Brainiac changed Superman's DNA to be more resistant to Kryptonite and, through Boomerang, suggests to an oblivious Waller that they capture Batman so he can devise a countermeasure. The squad captures Batman in his hideout and takes him to Lex-2, who develops Gold Kryptonite to combat Superman. With no further use for Batman, the squad takes him to an open area, where Harley kills him. Superman is lured out and subsequently killed with the squad's Gold Kryptonite weapons. However, Brainiac captures them, intending to brainwash them to be replacements for the League. Lex-2 rescues them and reveals that he has learned there are thirteen different iterations of Brainiac spread across different dimensions working together to take over the entire multiverse.

Waller and Lex-2 coordinate to teleport the squad to the first Brainiac's location on Earth-2 to confront him directly, where he proceeds to mimic the Flash's appearance and abilities. After a lengthy battle, the squad subdues and captures Brainiac, allowing Lex-2 to extract the information in his brain. The extraction ends up killing Brainiac, with the primary Brainiac's ship reacting by partially exploding. The squad prepares to hunt down the twelve Brainiacs remaining across the multiverse.

==== Season of the Joker ====
Following the defeat of the first Brainiac, the primary Brainiac begins to phase parts of other worlds into Earth-1 and enhance his troops. Waller sends the squad to "Joker Earth", an alternate universe where Brainiac xenoformed Metropolis using the DNA of the Joker, who killed his own Suicide Squad and A.R.G.U.S. forces in a failed suicide bombing attempt to kill Brainiac. The squad battles the second Brainiac, who takes the form of Green Lantern, and defeats him. The squad then captures the Joker and takes him back to Earth-1, where he agrees to join them in the ongoing war against Brainiac's forces. As the battle continues on Earth-1, Brainiac adapts his forces by infusing them with Green Lantern's DNA, giving them his powers. The squad returns to Joker Earth once more to confront the third Brainiac, who takes the form of Superman, and emerges victorious.

==== Season of Freeze ====
Waller establishes contact with Dr. Victoria Frias / Mrs. Freeze, a female variant of Dr. Victor Fries / Mr. Freeze from a world invaded by Brainiac, to enlist her help in stopping the invasion on Earth-1 and recovering the Flash, who is revealed to still be alive after his signal was detected on Brainiac's Skull Ship. The squad is deployed to clear out various incursions on Freeze's world, dubbed "Frozen Earth". Afterward, they are tasked with escorting Freeze and her cryogenically frozen wife, Nora, to Earth-1. Having ensured Nora's safety, Freeze agrees to join the squad. The squad confronts the fourth Brainiac, who uses a combination of the Flash and Superman's powers to combat them but is ultimately defeated. The squad successfully retrieves the Flash, uncorrupted, and returns to Earth-1, where the latter is put into stasis for recovery. Freeze proceeds to study the Flash, which also helps to accelerate her progress on finding a cure for Nora, though she begins to notice an inconsistency between Brainiac's actions and his strategy. The squad continues their work on Frozen Earth, and eventually defeats the fifth Brainiac.

==== Season of Lawless ====
Deadshot's daughter, Zoe Lawton, contacts the squad and reveals that she has been operating as the vigilante Lawless, tackling Brainiac's forces behind the scenes while also attempting to locate Green Lantern who is also revealed to still be alive. Waller sends the squad to "Fear World", a universe where Earth made its last stand against Brainiac in Gotham City. Here, Lawless tasks the squad with disabling Brainiac's armada so she can extract Green Lantern from his pod. They succeed, though Lawless remains stuck on Brainiac's Skull Ship, forcing the squad to return later to extract her. The squad faces the sixth Brainiac, who uses a combination of Green Lantern and Superman’s powers, and defeats him. Upon returning to the Hall of Justice in Earth-1, Lawless willingly signs up to join Task Force X, in spite of Deadshot's protests. The squad continues their fight on Fear World, and eventually defeats the seventh Brainiac.

==== Season of Deathstroke ====
Waller tasks the squad with infiltrating "Medieval Earth", a feudal-themed universe Brainiac has only recently invaded, to help extract Deathstroke, who is revealed to have been working with Waller since the beginning of Brainiac's invasion and has killed two variants on his own. After dismantling several of Brainiac's operations, the squad confronts the eighth Brainiac on Medieval Earth, where Deathstroke quickly kills him before he can retaliate. Deathstroke and the squad then return to Earth-1.

With Brainiac's forces dwindling, Waller orders the squad to return to Medieval Earth and kill the primary Brainiac, as well as rescue Superman. The squad, with support from the Flash and Green Lantern, battles the final three Brainiac iterations, and defeats them. They are then joined by Superman and Batman, who manage to escape from their containment pods, with Batman landing the final blow on Brainiac. Superman reveals to the squad that the League members they killed were merely clones created by Brainiac to serve him. He then enlists the squad to help the League clear out remnants of Brainiac's forces across the multiverse. The support squad members also help disable all of the squad's neck bombs, rendering Waller unable to harm them. A statue of Wonder Woman is erected to honor her sacrifice, while Lex-2 begins a new presidential campaign on Earth-1. As the squad joins the League on their new mission, they deliver Brainiac to Waller as a parting gift and pass classified A.R.G.U.S. documents to Daily Planet reporter Lois Lane.

== Development ==
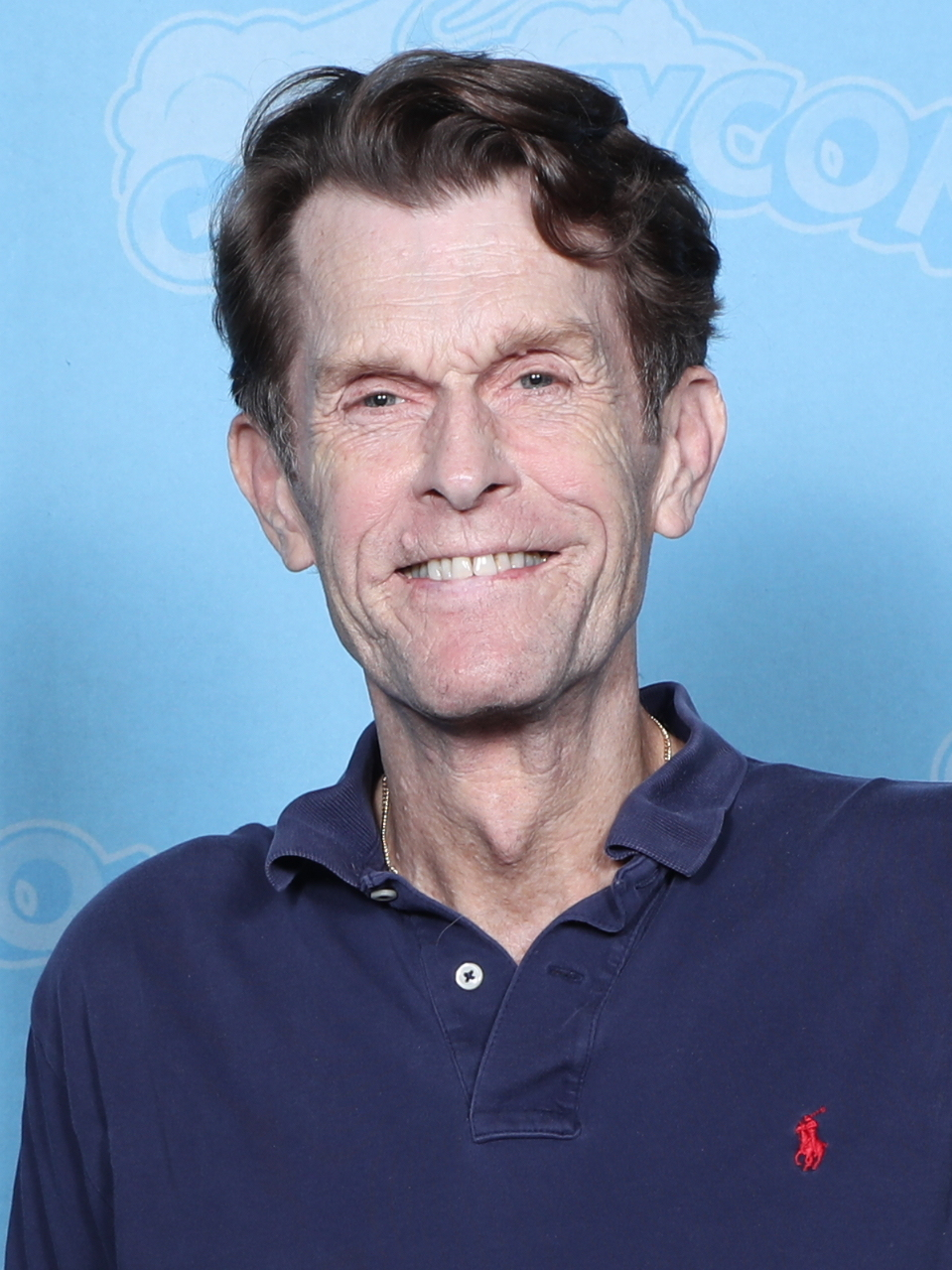
Following his death on November 10, 2022, the game marks Kevin Conroy's final video game role as Batman.

A video game based on the Suicide Squad was announced by then DC Comics chief creative officer Geoff Johns in July 2010. In February 2012, he elaborated that the game was in development, adding that "Because of the concept, you have a game where any of the lead characters can conceivably die and it's not a stunt. Some really cool story could come out of that." The formation of the Suicide Squad was teased at the end of Batman: Arkham Origins (2013)—developed by WB Games Montréal—which featured a post-credits scene in which Deathstroke is asked by Amanda Waller to join the team, and in Batman: Arkham Origins Blackgate (2013), in which Deadshot and Bronze Tiger join the team with Bane under consideration. In the years since Batman: Arkham Knight (2015) was released, there had been rumors suggesting that WB Games Montréal was working on a Suicide Squad game, but no official announcement was made from the development team or publisher. In December 2016, Jason Schreier from Kotaku revealed that the title was cancelled.

Rocksteady, the creator of the Batman: Arkham franchise, was initially rumored to be working on a Superman-themed game, which they later debunked. Rocksteady announced Suicide Squad: Kill the Justice League in August 2020, with the first trailer for the game premiering at DC FanDome on August 22, 2020. As the game is set in the "Arkhamverse", plot threads established in the Batman: Arkham series, including the Joker's death in Batman: Arkham City (2011) and the public revelation of Batman's identity as Bruce Wayne in Arkham Knight, would continue in Suicide Squad: Kill the Justice League. The Los Angeles–based company Unbroken Studios assisted Rocksteady in the development of the game. Sweet Baby Inc. contributed to the game's script.

Following the game's release and subsequent failure, anonymous sources detailed a troubled development process that included shifting priorities, managerial bottlenecks, and a culture of "toxic positivity." The game originally focused on melee combat before moving to gunplay. Rocksteady co-founder Sefton Hill also tried to introduce a complex vehicle system late in development before it was ultimately scrapped.

== Release ==
On March 23, 2022, Rocksteady announced that Suicide Squad: Kill the Justice League had been delayed from its initial 2022 launch window to early 2023. At The Game Awards 2022, the release date was revealed to be May 26, along with the announcement that Batman would appear in the game, posthumously voiced by Kevin Conroy in what was marketed as his final performance as the character following his death on November 10, 2022.

On February 23, 2023, during a PlayStation State of Play and a separate FAQ, Rocksteady confirmed the game would require an internet connection at all times, have a battle pass, and is set to receive post-launch content such as new playable characters, missions and weapons. On 8 December 2023, Rocksteady announced that an offline mode will be added to the game after launch.

On April 13, 2023, Rocksteady announced that the game had been delayed again to 2 February 2024. The Epic Games Store version, however, was delayed to March 5, 2024, then later to March 26, 2024, for unspecified reasons.

On January 29, 2024, the game was released 72 hours as early access for owners of the deluxe edition on PlayStation 5 and Xbox Series X/S. Later that day, servers were taken down for several hours to fix a bug that caused players' story progress to be fully complete upon starting the game, with developers later giving affected players in-game currency in the way of an apology.

Four additional playable Squad members were introduced during the game's post-launch seasons, starting with an alternate reality version of the Joker, which was released on March 28. Warner Bros. Games confirmed it will complete the game's four-season roadmap and Rocksteady will continue to support the game through at least the first year. Season 2, featuring the addition of Mrs. Freeze, was announced on July 3, with a release date of July 11, but was delayed shortly before release to July 25. Season 3, featuring the addition of Lawless, was announced on September 26, with a release date of October 1. Season 4, featuring the addition of Deathstroke and an offline mode, was announced on December 6, with a release date of December 10. Rocksteady ended support for the game in January 2025.

== Reception ==
Reception

Aggregate scores
Aggregator	Score
Metacritic	(PC) 63/100 (PS5) 60/100 (XSXS) 61/100
OpenCritic	20%

Review scores
Publication	Score
Digital Trends	2.5/5
Eurogamer	3/5
Famitsu	32/40
Game Informer	6/10
GameSpot	5/10
GamesRadar+	2.5/5
Hardcore Gamer	2.5/5
IGN	5/10
NME	3/5
PC Gamer (US)	67/100
PCGamesN	4/10
Push Square	7/10
Shacknews	5/10
The Guardian	2/5
Video Games Chronicle	4/5
VG247	3/5

=== Pre-release ===
Press previews in January 2024 were "overwhelmingly negative", according to Kotaku's John Walker and VG247's Sherif Saed, with the game further suffering from bugs and server issues. It was also noted that many outlets were not sent review codes before the game's release. In an interview with the BBC's Newsbeat, Eurogamer writer Victoria Phillips Kennedy said she found the situation to withhold codes "slightly unusual". Both Kennedy and Saed speculated the decision was in response to the previews, while Chris Carter of Destructoid felt the technical issues had also played a part. Some noted that no outlet was entitled to a review code, and that similar circumstances for other games had occurred before.

=== Post-release ===
Suicide Squad: Kill the Justice League received "mixed or average" reviews, according to review aggregator website Metacritic, with 20% of critics recommending the game on OpenCritic. In Japan, four critics from Famitsu gave the game a total score of 32 out of 40, with each critic awarding the game an 8 out of 10.

Writing for IGN, Simon Cardy called the plot a "genuinely good DC comics story", but criticized the repetitive gameplay and "tired and dull" mechanics. Push Square's Aaron Bayne concluded that while he found the game fun and better than other live service games, it was still a lesser product than the Arkham games. In Forbes, Paul Tassi singled out the campaign as a point of criticism, stating that it is "not good. And gets increasingly worse as time goes on". He praised the graphical fidelity on display in cutscenes, as well as the combat mechanics.

More positively, Video Games Chronicle's Jordan Middler concluded that the game was "much better than the marketing would have you believe", enjoying the writing and gameplay, but believing it was let down by its live service elements. Zack Zwiezen for Kotaku concurred, expressing that the game was fun and well-written, though criticizing the repetitive mission design and live service endgame that he thought soured the ending.

Batman's portrayal in Kevin Conroy's final video game role as the character was highlighted. Polygon's Michael McWhertor wrote that Batman's presence was not only felt throughout the game, but that his depiction was in keeping with prior entries, particular praising Conroy's performance. Conversely, writing in IGN, Jesse Schedeen opined that he considered Rocksteady's handling of Batman poor, describing it as a waste of potential compared to how he was last seen in Arkham Knight. Batman's fate also drew backlash from some fans who claimed it was disrespectful, both as a sendoff and to Conroy's legacy. Tassi felt the response an overreaction given the comic book nature of the game and therefore ability to handwave decisions in this medium. Den of Geek's Matthew Byrd criticized the idea that the game's creative decisions should have been changed because of Conroy's death, while also partly linking the controversy to online culture wars seeking to depict the game as "woke".

=== Sales ===
While declining to give a sales figure, Warner Bros. Discovery chief financial officer Gunnar Wiedenfels confirmed in an earnings call in February 2024 that Suicide Squad: Kill the Justice League had failed to meet the company's expectations financially and would lead to a "tough year-over-year comp in Q1" for the game's division of the company. In May, Warner Bros. revealed that it had taken a $200 million loss on the game. In August, Warner Bros. reported a decline of 41 percent in their year-over-year revenue, attributing this to the "weak performance" of the game. In September 2024, anonymous employees told Eurogamer that Rocksteady's QA team had experienced a layoff, reducing the team's headcount by half, as a result of the game's poor sales. The studio suffered another layoff before the year's end, this time to the programming and artist teams, as well as more QA staff.

== Prequel comic ==
A prequel comic titled Suicide Squad: Kill Arkham Asylum was originally scheduled to release on May 30, 2023, four days after the game was originally set to release, but was delayed to October 2023, and delayed again to February 6, 2024. Its story takes place between the events of Arkham Knight and Suicide Squad: Kill The Justice League, and explains how Amanda Waller took control of Arkham Asylum and recruited Task Force X for their mission to kill the Justice League.
