= NetherRealm Studios =

American video game developer

- NetherRealm Studios' logo, depicting the silhouette of Scorpion from the Mortal Kombat series
- Type: Subsidiary
- Industry: Video games
- Predecessor: WB Games Chicago
- Founded: April 20, 2010; 16 years ago
- Headquarters: Chicago, Illinois, US
- Key people: Ed Boon (creative director); Shaun Himmerick (studio head)
- Products: Mortal Kombat series; Injustice series
- Parent: Warner Bros. Games
- Website: netherrealm.com

NetherRealm Studios is an American video game developer based in Chicago and owned by Warner Bros. Games. Led by video game industry veteran and Mortal Kombat co-creator Ed Boon, the studio is in charge of developing the Mortal Kombat and Injustice series of fighting games.

== History ==
On February 12, 2009, Midway Games filed for Chapter 11 bankruptcy in the United States. Warner Bros. subsequently acquired "substantially all of the assets", including Mortal Kombat, This Is Vegas and the Midway Games company structure, on July 10, 2009. While Warner Bros. went on to close most of Midway Games' Chicago headquarters and San Diego and Newcastle development studios, it retained the Chicago studio, which became part of Warner Bros. Interactive Entertainment (now Warner Bros. Games). The remaining studio was renamed WB Games Chicago several days later. On April 20, 2010, the studio was reincorporated as NetherRealm Studios, replacing WB Games Chicago.

NetherRealm Studios' first game, the ninth installment in the Mortal Kombat series, was released in April 2011. Their first game of original intellectual property, Injustice: Gods Among Us, based on the DC Universe, was released in 2013. The success of the two games allowed the development of respective sequels; Mortal Kombat X in 2015 and Injustice 2 in 2017. Also, NetherRealm developed Android and iOS versions for Batman: Arkham City Lockdown, Batman: Arkham Origins, and WWE Immortals. The company also developed Mortal Kombat 11, which was released on April 23, 2019. On October 18, 2022, NetherRealm announced that it was working on Mortal Kombat: Onslaught, a cinematic collection role-playing mobile game that was going to be released in 2023.

In July 2024, it was reported that the studio's mobile gaming division was shut down and at least 50 employees were laid off. The company announced that Mortal Kombat: Onslaught would shut down in October 2024.

== Games developed ==
Year	Title	Platform(s)	Notes
2011	Mortal Kombat	Windows, PlayStation 3, PlayStation Vita, Xbox 360	Microsoft Windows Version developed by High Voltage Software
2011	Mortal Kombat Arcade Kollection	Windows, PlayStation 3, Xbox 360	
2011	Batman: Arkham City Lockdown	Android, iOS	
2013	Injustice: Gods Among Us	Windows, PlayStation 3, PlayStation 4, PlayStation Vita, Wii U, Xbox 360, Android, iOS	PlayStation 4 and Microsoft Windows versions developed by High Voltage Software; PlayStation Vita version developed by Armature Studio
2013	Batman: Arkham Origins	Android, iOS	
2015	Mortal Kombat X (Note: Later released as Mortal Kombat XL.)	Windows, PlayStation 4, Xbox One	Microsoft Windows version initially ported by High Voltage Software, later replaced by QLOC
2015	Mortal Kombat Mobile	Android, iOS	
2015	WWE Immortals	Android, iOS	
2017	Injustice 2	Windows, PlayStation 4, Xbox One, Android, iOS	Microsoft Windows version ported by QLOC
2019	Mortal Kombat 11	Windows, Nintendo Switch, PlayStation 4, PlayStation 5, Xbox One, Xbox Series X/S, Stadia	Microsoft Windows version ported by QLOC; Nintendo Switch version ported by Shiver Entertainment
2023	Mortal Kombat: Onslaught	Android, iOS	
2023	Mortal Kombat 1	Windows, PlayStation 5, Xbox Series X/S, Nintendo Switch	Microsoft Windows version ported by QLOC; Nintendo Switch version ported by Shiver Entertainment and Saber Interactive

== Controversies ==
Shortly after the launch of Mortal Kombat 11, several independent declarations from former employees emerged about the studio's alleged practices and general working conditions during the development of its last four games, in what they described as a toxic workplace with common instances of gender discrimination, as well as severe crunch time. In May 2019, NetherRealm released a statement saying "At NetherRealm Studios, we greatly appreciate and respect all of our employees and prioritize creating a positive work experience. As an equal opportunity employer, we encourage diversity and constantly take steps to reduce crunch time for our employees. We are actively looking into all allegations, as we take these matters very seriously and are always working to improve our company environment. There are confidential ways for employees to raise any concerns or issues." Following the statement, NetherRealm gave the studio the weekend off.

That same month, another article by Kotaku reported on the mental toll on developers working on such excessively violent video games—one developer detailed stories about how the team would view pictures and videos of murders or animal slaughter as reference material, which would cause nightmares and eventual insomnia, with a diagnosis of post-traumatic stress disorder.
