= Batman: Arkham VR =

2016 video game

- Developer: Rocksteady Studios
- Publisher: Warner Bros. Interactive Entertainment
- Directors: Sefton Hill; Adam Doherty
- Producers: Daniel Bailie; Nathan Burlow
- Designer: Ian Ball
- Programmer: Ben Wyatt
- Artist: David Hego
- Writers: Martin Lancaster; Craig Owens
- Composers: Nick Arundel; David Buckley
- Series: Batman: Arkham
- Engine: Unreal Engine 4
- Platforms: PlayStation 4; Windows
- Release: PlayStation 4; October 11, 2016; Windows; April 25, 2017
- Genre: Adventure
- Mode: Single-player

Batman: Arkham VR is a virtual reality adventure video game developed by Rocksteady Studios and published by Warner Bros. Interactive Entertainment for PlayStation 4 and Windows. Based on the DC Comics superhero Batman, it is part of the Batman: Arkham series and the first installment to use virtual reality headsets, allowing players to experience the game world from Batman's perspective. Arkham VR was released worldwide on October 11, 2016, for PlayStation 4 and on April 25, 2017, for Windows for VR headsets (HTC Vive, Oculus Rift, and Valve Index).

Written by Ian Ball and Martin Lancaster, Arkham VR is based on the franchise's long-running comic book mythos. The game's storyline takes place between 2011's Batman: Arkham City and 2015's Batman: Arkham Knight, and follows Batman as he investigates the disappearance of his allies Nightwing and Robin. The game is presented from a first-person perspective, with a primary focus on using Batman's skills and gadgets to explore the immediate environment and solve puzzles.

Arkham VR received generally mixed reviews, with criticism directed at its short length and simplistic gameplay. It was nominated for multiple year-end accolades, winning several.

== Gameplay ==
Batman: Arkham VR is an adventure game played from a first-person perspective using PlayStation VR, HTC Vive, or Oculus Rift virtual reality headsets and associated controllers to see through the eyes of the playable character, Batman. The player can look around the environment freely and interact with reachable items, and access three gadgets from Batman's utility belt: the throwable batarang, the grapnel gun—a grappling hook, and the forensic scanner, which can be used to examine evidence and recreate crime scenes. The player is able to teleport to preset locations around the current environment (with movement sometimes represented by use of the grapnel gun) but the character cannot walk freely.

Unlike previous Arkham games, Arkham VR features no combat and instead focuses on solving puzzles to find clues that will advance the mystery. The game features optional tasks, including 30 challenges from the supervillain Riddler, who adds various puzzles and concealed items to locate after the game has been completed, target practice with the batarang, and viewing profiles and models for the series' various characters on the Batcomputer.

== Synopsis ==
=== Characters ===
Arkham VR features an ensemble cast of characters from Batman comics. The main character is Batman (Kevin Conroy)—a superhero trained to the peak of human physical and mental perfection and an expert in martial arts. He is supported by his allies, Robin (Tom Austen), Nightwing, and his loyal butler Alfred Pennyworth (Hugh Fraser). Batman's crusade against crime brings him into conflict with the weapon-dealing Penguin (Ian Redford), the mutated cannibal Killer Croc (Steven Blum), and the puzzle-obsessed Riddler (Wally Wingert). Batman's nemesis, the psychopathic Joker (Mark Hamill), appears as a hallucination following his death during the events of Batman: Arkham City, after succumbing to a fatal disease caused by his previous consumption of the Titan formula (Batman: Arkham Asylum), an unstable steroid serum which turns people into maddened monsters. Arkham VR also features minor appearances from reporter Vicki Vale (Jules de Jongh), Batman's parents Thomas (Kevin Conroy) and Martha Wayne (Andrea Deck), and their killer Joe Chill (Glenn Wrage).

=== Plot ===
Bruce Wayne is woken by an alarm clock from a nightmare about the night of his parents' murder. He is informed by his butler Alfred that there is an urgent situation that requires his attention. Activating a secret entrance to the Batcave beneath his manor, Wayne puts on his Batsuit and gadgets to become Batman. In the Batcave, Alfred informs Batman that both Robin and Nightwing have disappeared, and he has been unable to contact them. Batman activates Nightwing's tracker, which reveals he is in Central Gotham. Heading out in the Batmobile, Batman arrives to find Nightwing dead in an alleyway. His investigation reveals an unknown assailant brutally attacked Nightwing, breaking his jaw, arm, and ribs before finishing him off by snapping his neck. The investigation also reveals one of the Penguin's men had witnessed the murder and fled the scene, with the assailant chasing after him.

Batman travels in the Batwing to confront the Penguin at his Iceberg Lounge club. The Penguin reveals the henchman was killed in an explosion which destroyed half of his Iceberg Lounge before he could reveal the identity of Nightwing's killer; this is implied to be the work of the same assailant. Batman infiltrates the Gotham morgue to examine the victims and is able to piece together shrapnel from the explosive. Batman learns the charge belonged to a demolitions company working on a sewer project beneath Founders Island. By focusing his search in this area, Batman is able to make radio contact with Robin, who warns that he is being held captive to lure Batman into a trap.

As Batman moves through the sewers, he hears intercom announcements from the deceased Joker. Batman finds Robin in a cage, but while attempting to free him, he is also captured. Robin notes Joker-styled graffiti on the cage and assumes their captor is emulating the Joker. The Joker's voice rebukes Robin, letting him know he is dealing with the real Joker. Batman and Robin are prevented from escaping by Killer Croc and use the electrified cages to temporarily stave off his attacks. Robin escapes, but is violently crushed by Croc after getting out of his cage.

Batman's cage suddenly transforms into an elevator descending into the depths of Arkham Asylum. Batman interacts with a few prison cells before the last reveals a captive Joker. Batman is soon locked alone in a cell, which begins to change, displaying scrawled and bloody accusations of "killer" and "HA" on the walls. It is revealed that Batman himself murdered Nightwing, blew up the witness, and lured Robin into the sewers. The Joker had temporarily seized control of Batman's mind and body through a transfusion of his infected blood. Left utterly horrified at this discovery, Batman looks into his cell's mirror to see the Joker as his reflection. The Joker announces that the "dynamic duo" are together at last before laughing maniacally, followed by the lights going out.

== Development ==
In June 2016 at E3 2016, it was announced that Rocksteady was developing Batman: Arkham VR for the PlayStation VR, which was released in October of the same year. The game has players "utilize [Batman's] legendary gadgets to unravel a plot that threatens the lives of his closest allies." Following a five-month period of exclusivity for the PlayStation 4, the game was released for the Oculus Rift and HTC Vive on April 25, 2017. Rocksteady teased the plot for Arkham VR in the Arkham Knight downloadable content "Crime Fighter Challenge Pack #6", which allowed players to explore the Wayne Manor and interact with a piano to reveal a hidden wall containing references to a murder, shrapnel, and the Penguin. The game was built using Unreal Engine 4.

== Reception ==
Reception

Aggregate scores
| Aggregator | Score |
|---|---|
| Metacritic | (PS4) 74/100 |
| OpenCritic | 56% |

Review scores
| Publication | Score |
|---|---|
| Destructoid | 6.5/10 |
| Edge | 7/10 |
| Game Informer | 7.5/10 |
| GameSpot | 7/10 |
| IGN | 7.2/10 |
| PlayStation Official Magazine – Australia | 8/10 |
| USgamer | 3/5 |
| Road to VR | 8/10 |

Batman: Arkham VR received "mixed or average" reviews from critics for the PlayStation 4 version of the game, according to review aggregator website Metacritic.

Zero Punctuation's Ben Croshaw called the PSVR version "incredible garbage" and "a half hour CD-ROM virtual tour from mid to late 90s", later nominating it as one of the worst games of 2016. The Official UK PlayStation Magazine listed it as the seventh best PSVR game.

The Game Critics Awards awarded the game as Best VR Game. The National Academy of Video Game Trade Reviewers awarded the game in the category Direction in Virtual Reality. At IGN's Best of E3 2016 Awards the game won in the categories Best Puzzle Game and Best VR Experience. At the Italian Video Game Awards the game won in the category Most Innovative Game. At the Develop Awards the game won in the categories Best Sound Design and Best Visual Design. At the IGN Awards 2016 the game won as Best VR Game and as People's Choice Best VR game. At the PlayStation Blog Game of the Year 2016, the game won as Best PlayStation VR Game. At the BAFTA Games Award the game as nominated in the categories Best British Game and Game Innovation.

In Europe, it was the biggest selling PSVR game of 2017.
