= Batman: Arkham City Lockdown =

2011 video game

- Developer: NetherRealm Studios
- Publisher: Warner Bros. Interactive Entertainment
- Designer: Mike Lee
- Programmer: Anthony J. Rod
- Composer: Nick Arundel
- Series: Batman: Arkham
- Engine: Unreal Engine 3
- Platforms: iOS, Android
- Release: iOS; December 7, 2011; Android; June 26, 2013
- Genre: Action-adventure
- Mode: Single-player

Batman: Arkham City Lockdown was a 2011 fighting video game developed by NetherRealm Studios and published by Warner Bros. Interactive Entertainment. Based on the DC Comics superhero Batman, it is a spin-off to Batman: Arkham City, and the first mobile game in the Batman: Arkham series. Set a few weeks before Arkham City, Arkham City Lockdown follows Batman as he attempts to capture several villains who have escaped from Arkham Asylum and are causing mayhem in the streets of Gotham City. As Batman, players fight enemies using melee combat, and earn points for doing so, which can be used to upgrade Batman's stats or to unlock gadgets and alternate costumes.

The game was released for the iOS mobile operating system on December 7, 2011, and for Android on June 26, 2013. It features integration with Game Center. Arkham City Lockdown received generally positive reviews from critics, who praised its combat and fast pace, but noted that the game doesn't offer much beyond that.

== Gameplay ==
Arkham City Lockdown is a fighting game that requires the player to use the touch screen to control Batman and defeat enemies. If the player moves their finger left and right, they can make Batman punch his foes repeatedly. If an enemy attempts to punch Batman, the player can slide their finger down to deflect the foe's attack. Batman can also counter foes by tapping a certain body part on the screen which will result in a takedown (or deplete a lot of their health). Some enemies have attacks that can't be blocked, only dodged (symbolized by a red colored shield). During fights, players can transform the kinetic energy accumulated into potential energy to create devastating blows. As the player defeats enemies, they automatically gain experience points, which are used to buy upgrades such as gadgets, combo strikes, health boosts, etc. Players can also buy alternate costumes for Batman; the 1970s Batsuit is the only one available for free to all players upon download.

The final version of the game features six levels and an additional four Bonus Stages which reward the player with upgrades for Batman. Each level features three or four thugs to fight in two stages, and a boss at the end of the level. After beating the game, players can replay levels on an increased difficulty where enemies deal more damage and have more health.

== Plot ==
After Mayor Quincy Sharp announces Arkham City, a new super-prison based in the decaying urban slums of Gotham City, the Joker rallies several villains to stage a breakout from Arkham Asylum. While the villains and their goons are causing mayhem in the streets of Gotham, Batman attempts to stop them. He quickly deals with Two-Face's and the Penguin's gangs, and defeats Solomon Grundy in the sewers. Meanwhile, Hugo Strange, the warden of Arkham City, hires the assassin Deathstroke to capture Batman, but he is defeated and sent to Blackgate Penitentiary.

Later, while patrolling the rooftops, Batman encounters the Joker, who reveals that he is slowly dying due to the unstable properties of the Titan formula (which he injected himself with at the end of Batman: Arkham Asylum). Batman defeats the Joker and his goons, and they are arrested. Enraged at the Joker's capture, Harley Quinn and the Joker's remaining men, including Mr. Hammer, hold a reporter hostage to ransom her for the Joker's release, but Batman defeats them and rescues the reporter. Meanwhile, Robin attempts to capture Poison Ivy, but she mentally enslaves him, along with several police officers, using her special pheromones. Batman manages to free them from Ivy's control before capturing Ivy and taking her back to Arkham.

== Development ==
The game has been updated three times since its release. The first update added more achievements and costumes, while the second and third added more areas and villains (Harley Quinn in Update 2 and Poison Ivy in Update 3). Each of these updates also added more skins and achievements, and raised the level cap.

The game features voice acting, with many actors reprising their roles from Arkham Asylum and Arkham City. The ensemble cast includes Kevin Conroy as Batman, Mark Hamill as the Joker, Tara Strong as Harley Quinn, Fred Tatasciore as Solomon Grundy and Mr. Hammer, Troy Baker as Two-Face and Robin, and Corey Burton as Hugo Strange. Amy Carle replaces Tasia Valenza as Poison Ivy, while the character Deathstroke makes his debut in the series (voiced by Larry Grimm, who would be replaced by Mark Rolston in Arkham Origins and Arkham Knight).

== Reception ==
Reception

Aggregate score
Aggregator	Score
Metacritic	69/100

Review scores
Publication	Score
Eurogamer	70%
IGN	70%
Pocket Gamer	70%
TouchArcade	4/5
Gamezebo	4/5

Eurogamer called it addictive. Gamezebo summarized it as "too easy, too short, and completely devoid of a story – but Batman Arkham City Lockdown is also a fast-paced, finger-swiping good time that looks stunning, keeps you hooked, and lets you be Batman." IGN said "There's a lot to like about Arkham City Lockdown, but there unfortunately isn't much to love. The game is a fun way to pass the time, but lacks the fantastic story that's made Rocksteady's Arkham games so notable on consoles." Pocket Gamer said that it "adds its own spin to the Infinity Blade-styled action game and packs a meaty punch with its presentation, but it never quite takes flight."
