= Rocksteady Studios =

British video game developer

Rocksteady Studios Limited
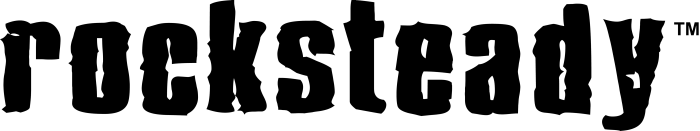
- Type: Subsidiary
- Industry: Video games
- Founded: 13 December 2004; 21 years ago
- Founders: Jamie Walker; Sefton Hill
- Headquarters: London, England
- Key people: Nathan Burlow (co-studio head); Darius Sadeghian (co-studio head)
- Products: Urban Chaos: Riot Response; Batman: Arkham (2009–present)
- Number of employees: 214 (2024)
- Parent: Warner Bros. Games (2010–present)
- Website: rocksteadyltd.com

Rocksteady Studios Limited is a British video game developer based in London. Founded on 13 December 2004, the studio is best known for its work in the Batman: Arkham series. The company is a subsidiary of Warner Bros. Games.

== History ==
Rocksteady Studios was founded by Jamie Walker and Sefton Hill, the former creative director and head of production at Argonaut Games. The publisher SCi Entertainment worked with Argonaut Games on the game Roll Call until the developer shut down in late 2004. Walker and Hill founded Rocksteady on 13 December 2004. In January 2005, SCi announced that it had assigned Roll Call to the nascent studio, which by that time employed 20 people, mostly former Argonaut Games staff, at its North London offices. The publisher acquired 25.1% of Rocksteady's shares and loaned the studio £250,000. Roll Call was soon renamed Zero Tolerance: City Under Fire and then Urban Chaos: Riot Response. It was released in 2006 for the PlayStation 2 and Xbox.

After SCi (since renamed Eidos) obtained the rights to make a Batman game in spring 2007, it approached Rocksteady who presented its take on the Batman licence, and by May 2007, it had begun developing the concept of Batman: Arkham Asylum, with full production beginning in September 2007. The game's commercial and critical success led publisher Warner Bros. Interactive Entertainment (WBIE) to acquire an undisclosed majority stake in Rocksteady in February 2010. The Warner Bros. group of companies also included DC Comics, the Batman licensor. Eidos retained its 25.1% stake and representation on the board of directors. Rocksteady followed up Arkham Asylum with Batman: Arkham City in 2011 and Batman: Arkham Knight in 2015, both of which received critical acclaim. The studio also experimented with virtual reality in 2016, releasing the spin-off game Batman: Arkham VR for the PlayStation VR. In the same year, Rocksteady started working on a multiplayer puzzle-solving game codenamed Stones. This title was soon shelved as Warner Bros. directed the studio to make a multiplayer title based on the Suicide Squad from DC Comics.

In August 2020, Rocksteady announced its next game titled Suicide Squad: Kill the Justice League. The game had been in production at Rocksteady since 2017, who were taking over development following the cancellation of the previous iteration at WB Games Montréal in late 2016. Over the course of development of seven years, the studio struggled to get the game off the ground, having very little experience in its genre, which resulted in several postponements. A Suicide Squad game had been teased at the end of Batman: Arkham Origins (developed by WB Games Montreal), and in the years since Batman: Arkham Knight was released, Rocksteady had been rumoured to be working on a Suicide Squad game. The Suicide Squad game is set five years after the events of Arkham Knight, and was released in February 2024.

The Guardian reported in August 2020 that the studio had failed to address issues related to sexual harassment and inappropriate behaviour that more than half of the female employees had written to the studios executives about in a November 2018 letter. Such actions had included "slurs regarding the transgendered community", "discussing a woman in a derogatory or sexual manner with other colleagues", and sexual harassment "in the form of unwanted advances, leering at parts of a woman’s body, and inappropriate comments in the office". Rocksteady said to The Guardian, "In 2018 we received a letter from some of our female employees expressing concerns they had at that time, and we immediately took firm measures to address the matters that were raised. Over the subsequent two years we have carefully listened to and learned from our employees, working to ensure every person on the team feels supported. In 2020 we are more passionate than ever to continue to develop our inclusive culture, and we are determined to stand up for all of our staff." The following day, Rocksteady posted on social media what it claimed to be an "unsolicited" letter written by some of the employees who had signed the 2018 letter, disputing the claims reported in The Guardian.

At the end of 2022, co-founders Jamie Walker and Sefton Hill left Rocksteady after more than 18 years at the company and during the development of Suicide Squad: Kill the Justice League. They formed a new company called Hundred Star Games in January 2024 that will consist of “only 100 industry veterans and emerging talents.” Nathan Burlow and Darius Sadeghian were promoted to replace them.

Since 2024, Rocksteady launched and supported Suicide Squad: Kill the Justice League for a year and was also assisting in the development of a director's cut for Hogwarts Legacy (which was later cancelled). In May 2024, Warner Bros. disclosed that the former game incurred a loss of approximately $200 million. In September, anonymous employees told Eurogamer that Rocksteady's QA team had experienced a layoff, reducing the team's headcount by half, as a result of the game's poor sales. The studio suffered another layoff before the year's end, this time to the programming and artist teams, as well as more QA staff. By the end of 2024, Rocksteady had 214 employees.

== Games developed ==
Year	Title	Platform(s)	Notes
2006	Urban Chaos: Riot Response	PlayStation 2, Xbox	—
2009	Batman: Arkham Asylum	macOS, Microsoft Windows, Nintendo Switch, PlayStation 3, PlayStation 4, Xbox 360, Xbox One (Note: PlayStation 4 and Xbox One versions released as part of Batman: Return to Arkham; Nintendo Switch version released as part of Batman: Arkham Trilogy.)	—
2011	Batman: Arkham City	macOS, Microsoft Windows, Nintendo Switch, PlayStation 3, PlayStation 4, Wii U, Xbox 360, Xbox One (Note: Wii U version released as Batman: Arkham City - Armored Edition.)	—
2013	Batman: Arkham Origins	Microsoft Windows, PlayStation 3, Wii U Xbox 360	Supervising, additional work, and development support
2015	Batman: Arkham Knight	Microsoft Windows, Nintendo Switch, PlayStation 4, Xbox One (Note: Nintendo Switch version released as part of Batman: Arkham Trilogy.)	—
2016	Batman: Arkham VR	Microsoft Windows, PlayStation 4	—
2024	Suicide Squad: Kill the Justice League	Microsoft Windows, PlayStation 5, Xbox Series X/S	—
2026	Lego Batman: Legacy of the Dark Knight	Microsoft Windows, PlayStation 5, Xbox Series X/S, Nintendo Switch 2 (Note: Provided development work and support to Traveller's Tales.)	Co-developer, additional work and development support
