= Lego Star Wars (disambiguation) =

Lego Star Wars is a Lego theme based around models of vehicles and sets from the Star Wars franchise.

It can also refer to:

- Lego Star Wars: The Video Game, a video game that provides a humorous and child-oriented retelling of the Star Wars prequel trilogy
  - Lego Star Wars II: The Original Trilogy, the sequel to Lego Star Wars: The Video Game that retells the original trilogy
  - Lego Star Wars: The Complete Saga, a compilation of the first two games
  - Lego Star Wars III: The Clone Wars, the third in the series of games
  - Lego Star Wars: The Force Awakens
  - Lego Star Wars: The Skywalker Saga, an updated version following the story of all 9 feature films
- Several animated shorts and specials airing on Cartoon Network
  - Lego Star Wars: Revenge of the Brick, a 2005 mini-movie based on Revenge of the Sith
  - Lego Star Wars: The Quest for R2-D2, a 2009 animated mini-movie and online game based loosely on CN's series Star Wars: The Clone Wars TV series
  - Lego Star Wars: Bombad Bounty, a 2010 mini-movie following Jar Jar Binks and Boba Fett in a story "behind the scenes" of the original trilogy
  - Lego Star Wars: The Padawan Menace, a 2011 30-minute TV special about a Jedi Academy field trip
  - Lego Star Wars: The Empire Strikes Out, a 2012 30-minute TV Special focusing on humorous activities of Luke Skywalker and Darth Vader following Star Wars Episode IV: A New Hope
  - Lego Star Wars: The Yoda Chronicles, a 2013 trilogy of 30-minute TV specials
- List of Lego Star Wars, a list of all sets, from the theme, so far released
