= Lego Star Wars: Revenge of the Brick =

- Based on: Star Wars: Episode III – Revenge of the Sith directed by George Lucas Lego Star Wars from The Lego Group and Lucasfilm Star Wars created by George Lucas
- Written by: Daniel Lipkowitz
- Directed by: Royce Graham; Pete Bregman; Mark Hamill; Bill Horvath; Karl Turkel
- Music by: Kostia Efimov; John Williams
- Country of origin: Denmark; Belgium; Germany
- Original languages: English; Frisian; German

Production
- Producers: Keith Malone; Treehouse Animation
- Editor: Elizabeth Hurd
- Running time: 5:16
- Production companies: Treehouse Animation; Lego Systems Inc. Lucasfilm

Original release
- Network: Cartoon Network
- Release: May 8, 2005

Lego Star Wars: Revenge of the Brick is a brickfilm (Lego short film) loosely based on Star Wars: Episode III – Revenge of the Sith. Revenge of the Brick premiered on Cartoon Network on May 8, 2005, at 7:00 p.m. EST. It is based on George Lucas’s movie franchise of the same name and The Lego Group's Lego Star Wars construction toy line. The movie can now be seen in QuickTime format on the Lego website or directly downloaded. It was also released with the Clone Wars Volume Two DVD as one of its special features.

The spoof was produced by Treehouse Animation, which has since collaborated again with Lego on producing Batman short films similar to it. Mark Hamill, who played Luke Skywalker in the original trilogy of Star Wars films, was involved in the creation of this project and narrates a "making-of" feature on the website. According to Hamill, "as the original Luke Skywalker, I think I know something about making Star Wars movies. So the fit with Treehouse Animations made perfect sense."

The film also appeared on October 2, 2005, at the 2005 Woodstock Film Festival, in the "Animation for Kids" category.

== Presentation style ==
The short is a very tongue-in-cheek look at the important happenings of Star Wars Episode III: Revenge of the Sith, and is presented in a 3-D computer animation format, as is Treehouse's specialty.

The spoof features stylized versions of the Lego Star Wars Episode III building kits in fantasy situations, portraying the interactivity of Lego in various scenes. Lego's classic mini-figures are also made more 3-D in their detail, with more flexibility in movement portrayed to facilitate the film's action sequences.

== Plot ==
=== Space battle above Kashyyyk ===
The movie begins with a short Star Wars opening crawl, detailing that droids belonging to the "evil Separatists" have amassed above the Wookiee planet of Kashyyyk, and that Jedi Knights have been sent to stop the invasion and restore peace.

Two Republic fighters appear above the planet and fly towards a Trade Federation control ship (from The Phantom Menace). Count Dooku watches from inside, and then, smiling, presses a button, which turns a revolving chair with Grievous sitting on it.

Back outside, Anakin (along with a clone trooper pilot) is being chased in his starfighter (an ARC-170) by three enemy droid tri-fighters. Anakin leads them into a trench and has two of the enemy ships destroyed by laser cannons fired by their own side. The remaining craft launches a buzz droid at the ARC-170, which lands near the clone trooper rear gunner, who uses a can of "Buzz Spray" to dislodge the robot. The buzz droid moves over to Anakin's window, and after being removed by Anakin's windshield wipers, the droid lands on the craft's engine and begins to cut into it. Back inside the control ship, Count Dooku tries to watch the battle outside on his television, but only receives static or intermittent test patterns. The shot zooms out to reveal General Grievous balancing on top of the television, acting as a living antenna.

Meanwhile, Obi-Wan is being chased by another vulture droid, who launches two missiles at his Jedi interceptor. Obi-Wan uses the Force to dismantle his ship into individual LEGO pieces, and reassembles it after the missiles pass, which instead hits two other enemy ships, destroying them. Anakin's ship is hit by laser fire from the control ship and explodes into its component pieces, but Anakin uses the Force to reassemble it – into a biplane. Looking embarrassed, he again reassembles his craft into a new starfighter, and Force-pushes the buzz droid into the Trade Federation control ship, creating a hole in the wall. Anakin's craft flies through the hole (with Anakin standing on top of the craft rather than sitting inside it), and encounters three droidekas standing on a platform. As his clone trooper pilot hangs onto the wing for dear life, Anakin throws his lightsaber like a boomerang, which destroys the platform's support, sending it tumbling down.

Obi-Wan's Jedi interceptor is hit by enemy laser fire, and his right wing is destroyed. However, he uses the Force to disassemble several droid fighters to their individual pieces and attaches them to his craft. He pilots his Y-wing towards the Trade Federation control ship and fires a few well-placed shots at it, causing a giant explosion. Anakin's ship escapes from an access tunnel just in time as the control ship spectacularly explodes, and Obi-Wan and Anakin head down to Kashyyyk.

=== Battle on Kashyyyk ===
The sequence shifts to Kashyyyk. Yoda spots some battle droids and uses his Force powers to destroy several of these droids and reassemble them in a higgledy-piggledy fashion, and then uses his lightsaber to destroy the remaining droids. A Juggernaut arrives, and Mace Windu and the clone troopers come out of the vehicle and attack, joined by the Wookiees under Chewbacca, Anakin and Obi-Wan.

As the battle commences, Chewbacca dodges an enemy droid tank, which skids to a halt and turns to charge again, determined to run him down. Chewbacca hastily assembles a rocket launcher out of spare Lego pieces and shoots a rocket at the enemy, hitting one of its tracks. The tank skids out of control and almost hits Chewbacca, who faints from shock.

Almost all the clones and Wookiees have been destroyed or have run away; Anakin, Obi-Wan, Yoda, Mace Windu and Chewbacca find themselves surrounded. But then Wookiee reinforcements arrive and beat the droids back. The remaining droids retreat in a demoralised rabble.

=== Epilogue ===
The next sequence takes place in a setting similar to the cantina in A New Hope, including its famous soundtrack, with General Grievous acting as the bartender and several other Star Wars characters in attendance. R2-D2, carrying some drinks on a tray strapped to his back, passes Yoda, who uses his Force powers to deliver the drinks to the next table. Obi-Wan and Anakin are drinking happily when Chewbacca takes a photo using a Polaroid of Anakin and Obi-Wan standing together happily. Chewbacca sees that the picture is not a picture of the two Jedi standing together happily, but is actually of Darth Vader and Old Ben Kenobi in a lightsaber battle. He faints yet again, ending the film.

The end credits show, accompanied by a clip of Darth Vader conducting, with his lightsaber as a baton, some clones in the famous Imperial March.

== See also ==
- Lego Star Wars
- Lego Star Wars: The Video Game
- Lego Star Wars II: The Original Trilogy
