= Chewbacca =

Fictional character in the Star Wars franchise

- Star Wars character
- First appearance: Star Wars: From the Adventures of Luke Skywalker (1976)
- Created by: George Lucas
- Portrayed by: Peter Mayhew (Note: Original trilogy Revenge of the Sith The Force Awakens Star Wars Holiday Special); Joonas Suotamo (Note: Solo: A Star Wars Story Sequel trilogy)

In-universe information
- Nickname: Chewie
- Species: Wookiee
- Gender: Male
- Occupation: Co-pilot and first mate on Millennium Falcon
- Affiliation: Rebel Alliance; Resistance
- Family: Attichitcuk (father)
- Spouse: Mallatobuck
- Children: Lumpawaroo (son)
- Homeworld: Kashyyyk

Chewbacca, (Note: Pronunciation: /tʃuːˈbɑːkə/, choo-BAH-kə) nicknamed "Chewie", is a fictional character in the Star Wars franchise. He is a Wookiee—a tall, hairy, highly intelligent species originating from the planet Kashyyyk. He is 7.5 feet (2.3 m) tall, and typically wears only a bandolier and a tool pouch. He carries a bowcaster, a traditional Wookiee weapon, and he speaks the Wookiee language Shyriiwook. He first appeared in the original Star Wars film (1977) (Note: Originally titled Star Wars, the film was later retitled Star Wars: Episode IV—A New Hope.) and its novelization (1976) as the loyal friend of the smuggler Han Solo. Chewbacca is also the co-pilot of Han's starship, the Millennium Falcon.

Chewbacca is portrayed by Peter Mayhew in the original film trilogy, the Star Wars Holiday Special (1978), and Revenge of the Sith (2005). Mayhew shares the Chewbacca role with his body double, Joonas Suotamo, in The Force Awakens (2015). Following Mayhew's retirement in 2017, Suotamo took over the role, appearing in The Last Jedi (2017) and The Rise of Skywalker (2019). Suotamo also plays Chewbacca in the standalone film Solo: A Star Wars Story (2018). Chewbacca also appears in Star Wars animated series, novels, comics, and video games.

== Creation and portrayal ==
George Lucas invented many fictional characters while writing the original 1977 Star Wars film. (Note: Originally titled Star Wars, it was later retitled Star Wars: Episode IV – A New Hope.) Chewbacca was inspired by his dog, an Alaskan Malamute named Indiana. She would sit in the passenger seat of his car while he was driving, and he referred to her as his "co-pilot". Chewbacca's name was derived from the Russian word sobaka (собака), which means "dog". When creating concept art for Chewbacca, the Star Wars illustrator Ralph McQuarrie drew inspiration from John Schoenherr's 1975 illustrations for the science fiction magazine Analog.

The Chewbacca costume used in the original trilogy and the Star Wars Holiday Special was made from yak hair, rabbit hair and mohair. For The Force Awakens, multiple Chewbacca suits were crafted from yak hair, Lycra and a small amount of mohair. Chewbacca's voice was created by Ben Burtt, the sound designer for the original trilogy and the prequel trilogy. He generated the Wookiee's vocalizations by mixing together recordings of four bears, a badger, a lion, a seal, and a walrus. Mayhew modeled his performance of Chewbacca on the mannerisms of animals he observed in public zoos. (Note: Attributed to multiple references:)

=== In other countries ===
In the French version of the original Star Wars film, Chewbacca's name was changed to "Chiktaba" (Note: French pronunciation: [ʃiktaba]) and his nickname was "Chico". (Note: French pronunciation: [ʃiko]) In Italian-language versions of the films and in the most recent Star Wars media, Chewbacca is named "Ciubecca" (Note: Italian pronunciation: [tʃuˈbɛkka] or [tʃuˈbekka]) and his nickname is "Ciube". (Note: Italian pronunciation: [ˈtʃuːbe]) In the Czech version of the original Star Wars films, Chewbacca's name was changed to Žvejkal, a name derived from the Czech word žvýkat, meaning “to chew.” The name was used in older Czech translations before later versions returned to the original Chewbacca.

== Reception ==
In his 1997 review of the Special Edition re-release of The Empire Strikes Back, the film critic Roger Ebert declared that of all the characters, Chewbacca gave the worst performance. He wrote: "This character was thrown into the first film as window dressing, was never thought through, and as a result has been saddled with one facial expression and one mournful yelp. Much more could have been done. How can you be a space pilot and not be able to communicate in any meaningful way? Does Han Solo really understand Chew's monotonous noises? Do they have long chats sometimes?" In 1997, Chewbacca received a Lifetime Achievement Award at the MTV Movie Awards.

== Appearances ==
=== Original trilogy ===
Chewbacca was introduced in Star Wars (1977), and is portrayed by Peter Mayhew in all three films of the original film trilogy. Mayhew was cast primarily for his height of 7 feet 3 inches (2.21 m). In Star Wars, Chewbacca and Han Solo are smugglers who accept a charter to transport Luke Skywalker and Obi-Wan Kenobi to the planet Alderaan aboard their ship, the Millennium Falcon. When they find the planet obliterated by the Death Star, Chewbacca and Han help their passengers rescue Princess Leia and take her to the Rebel base on Yavin 4. In the film's climactic battle scene, Chewbacca and Han save Luke from being killed by Darth Vader, which allows Luke to destroy the Death Star. After the battle, Leia acknowledges Chewbacca for his achievements alongside Luke and Han.

The Empire Strikes Back (1980) takes place three years after Star Wars. Chewbacca and Han are planning to leave the Rebellion to pay off a debt to Jabba the Hutt, but are drawn back into the war when the Empire assaults the Rebel base. Chewbacca, Han and Leia seek refuge in Cloud City with Han's friend Lando Calrissian, unaware that Lando has betrayed them to the Empire. C-3PO is blasted into pieces by an Imperial stormtrooper, and Chewbacca saves him from being melted down. Before Han is frozen in carbonite and delivered to Jabba, he asks Chewbacca to look after Leia for him. Chewbacca, Leia and Lando escape from Vader in the Falcon. When Leia hears Luke's cry for help, she orders Chewbacca to turn the ship around to rescue him. In the film's final scene, Chewbacca joins the others in preparing to rescue Han from Jabba.

Lucas wanted to create audience sympathy for C-3PO in The Empire Strikes Back by having him get dismantled. Because both C-3PO and Chewbacca were likeable characters—and disliked one another—Lucas wanted them to have a bonding experience. Towards this end, Chewbacca rescues C-3PO and later repairs him with the help of R2-D2.

At the beginning of Return of the Jedi (1983), Chewbacca infiltrates Jabba's palace by pretending to be the prisoner of a bounty hunter, who is actually Leia in disguise. Chewbacca and his companions manage to rescue Han and escape. Later, Chewbacca joins the others on a mission to destroy the second Death Star's shield generator, which is located on Endor. During a battle, Chewbacca commandeers an AT-ST walker, which contributes to the mission's success. At the end of the film, Chewbacca and the other Rebels celebrate the destruction of the Death Star and the fall of the Empire.

=== Prequel trilogy ===
In Revenge of the Sith (2005), Chewbacca and his fellow Wookiee Tarfful fight in the Clone Wars when Kashyyyk is invaded by the Separatist Alliance. They also help the Jedi Master Yoda escape from clone troopers who were ordered to kill him.

=== Sequel trilogy ===
In The Force Awakens, Mayhew shares the Chewbacca role with his body double, Joonas Suotamo. In the film, which is set thirty years after Return of the Jedi, Chewbacca and Han find the Millennium Falcon, which had been stolen from them. They help the rogue First Order stormtrooper Finn, the scavenger Rey and the droid BB-8 escape from a gang of mercenaries, then fly to the castle of Maz Kanata so she can help them deliver BB-8 to the Resistance. While they are at Maz's castle, the First Order arrives and captures Rey. Chewbacca and the others fly to a Resistance base, where Chewbacca and Han reunite with Leia and C-3PO. They also soon reunite with Rey, who escaped from the First Order. During a Resistance mission, Han is killed by his son Kylo Ren, which prompts an enraged Chewbacca to shoot Kylo in the side. The Wookiee then sets off explosives that allow Poe Dameron and other X-wing pilots to destroy Starkiller Base, the First Order's superweapon. Before the base explodes, Chewbacca rescues Rey and Finn from the wilderness, where they had been fighting with Kylo. Later, Chewbacca helps Rey find Luke on the planet Ahch-To.

Suotamo portrays Chewbacca in The Last Jedi (2017), which takes place immediately after The Force Awakens. While Rey attempts to convince Luke to train her, Chewbacca develops a relationship with some seabirds known as Porgs. Later on, Chewbacca and Rey help the Resistance by using the Falcon to distract First Order TIE fighters.

Chewbacca returns in The Rise of Skywalker (2019), again played by Suotamo. He and his companions travel to the planet Passana, where they search for a clue to the location of a Sith wayfinder. With the help of Lando, they locate the clue, but are quickly found by the First Order. While Rey confronts Kylo, Chewbacca is captured and taken aboard a transport. Rey uses the Force to arrest the flight of the transport she mistakenly believes Chewbacca is on. She accidentally destroys the ship with Force lightning, and believes she has killed Chewbacca, who in reality was on a different transport. Deeply shaken by the apparent death of the Wookiee, Rey and the others pledge to continue the mission in his memory. Later on, Chewbacca's friends realize he is alive, and manage to rescue him. When they return to the Resistance base, they learn of Leia's death, and Chewbacca is distraught. He then helps Lando recruit citizens from across the galaxy to defeat the Sith Eternal forces. Near the end of the film, Chewbacca receives a medal from Maz.

=== Solo: A Star Wars Story ===
Suotamo portrays Chewbacca in the 2018 standalone film Solo: A Star Wars Story, which details the Wookiee's first meeting with Han. He was captured by Imperials on the planet Mimban, and is being held captive in a small pit. Han, considered a "troublemaker" by the Imperials, is thrown into the pit to be eaten by Chewbacca. The Wookiee attacks Han, but stops when Han reveals he can speak Shyriiwook. Chewbacca and Han form an instant bond and escape their captors. They join the crew of the thief Tobias Beckett, and make several attempts to steal coaxium for the Crimson Dawn crime syndicate. On Kessel, Chewbacca frees several other Wookiees from slavery. During the Kessel Run—in which Han flies the Falcon through a cloudy maelstrom—Chewbacca reveals his skill as a pilot. Near the end of the film, Beckett turns traitor and captures Chewbacca. After Han saves his friend and kills Beckett, he wins the Millennium Falcon from Lando. Chewbacca and Han then set off on more adventures in the Falcon.

=== Animated series ===
In the season 3 finale of the television series The Clone Wars, Chewbacca is captured by Trandoshan hunters, but is freed by Ahsoka Tano and agrees to help her and two younglings escape. He and Ahsoka attack the Trandoshan fortress with the assistance of Tarfful and other Wookiees. Chewbacca appears in both seasons of the web series Forces of Destiny (2017–2018). He is featured in episodes 5 and 10 of season 1, and in episodes 6 and 12 of season 2. (Note: Attributed to multiple references:) He also appears in the 2025 animated web series Droid Diaries.

=== Novels and comics ===
Chewbacca is featured in the novels Smuggler's Run: A Han Solo and Chewbacca Adventure (2015) and The Mighty Chewbacca in the Forest of Fear (2018). He appears in the comics Chewbacca (2015), Life Day (2021) and Han Solo and Chewbacca (2022–2023).

=== Video games ===
Chewbacca is a playable character in a variety of video games, including Masters of Teräs Käsi, Star Wars Battlefront II, Star Wars Battlefront: Renegade Squadron, Star Wars Battlefront: Elite Squadron, and the 2017 version of Star Wars Battlefront II. The Wookiee is also playable in the Lego Star Wars games Lego Star Wars: The Video Game, Lego Star Wars II: The Original Trilogy, Lego Star Wars: The Complete Saga, Lego Star Wars III: The Clone Wars, Lego Star Wars: The Force Awakens and Lego Star Wars: The Skywalker Saga.

Chewbacca was added to Fortnite on May 3rd 2024 as part of their LEGO Pass.

=== Other ===
The 1978 television program Star Wars Holiday Special introduces Chewbacca's family, including his wife Mallatobuck, his son Lumpawarrump, and his father Attichitcuk, who is the chief of the Kaapauku Tribe. The program features a story in which Chewbacca and Han travel to Kashyyyk to celebrate Life Day, while trying to prevent Darth Vader from spoiling the holiday. In the animated segment of the special, The Story of the Faithful Wookiee, Chewbacca and his companions search for a mystical talisman.

Chewbacca appears in the 2024 Simpsons short May the 12th Be with You, voiced by Chris Edgerly.

== Star Wars Legends ==
Following the acquisition of Lucasfilm by The Walt Disney Company in 2012, most of the licensed Star Wars novels and comics produced between 1977 and 2014 were rebranded as Star Wars Legends and declared non-canon to the franchise. The Legends works comprise a separate narrative universe. (Note: Attributed to multiple references:)

Chewbacca appears in the novel trilogies The Han Solo Adventures (1979–1980), The Black Fleet Crisis (1996–1997) (Note: Attributed to multiple references:) and The Han Solo Trilogy (1997–1998), as well as the novels Heirs of the Force (1995), Vector Prime (1999), and Dark Lord: The Rise of Darth Vader (2005).

Dark Lord: The Rise of Darth Vader is set just after Revenge of the Sith. When the Empire enslaves most of Kashyyyk's population to build the Death Star, Chewbacca escapes with a group of smugglers who are friendly to the Jedi. The Hutt Gambit—the second novel in The Han Solo Trilogy—explains how Chewbacca and Han first meet. While serving as a lieutenant in the Imperial Navy, Han finds Chewbacca unconscious aboard a slave ship. Han is ordered to skin the Wookiee, but rescues him instead. Upon regaining consciousness, Chewbacca swears a "life-debt" to Han, and the two become business partners and friends. In Vector Prime, Chewbacca sacrifices his life to save Han's son Anakin from a collision between the planet Sernpidal and one of its moons. Two of the Wookiee's family members offer to assume Chewbacca's life debt to Han.

Vector Prime was followed by the comic series Star Wars: Chewbacca, in which C-3PO and R2-D2 travel the galaxy collecting stories of beings who knew or met the Wookiee.

== See also ==
- Chewbacca defense
- Chewbacca Mask Lady
