= Lego Star Wars: The Video Game =

2005 video game

- European cover art
- Developer: Traveller's Tales (Note: Game Boy Advance version developed by Griptonite Games. Mac OS X version developed by i5works.)
- Publishers: Eidos Interactive; Giant Interactive Entertainment (Note: Mac OS X version published by Aspyr)
- Director: Jon Burton
- Programmer: John Hodskinson
- Artist: James Cunliffe
- Composer: David Whittaker (Note: Original music composed by John Williams)
- Series: Lego Star Wars
- Platforms: Game Boy Advance; PlayStation 2; Windows; Xbox; Mac OS X; GameCube
- Release: 29 March 2005: GBA, PS2, Windows; NA: 29 March 2005; PAL: 22 April 2005; Xbox; NA: 5 April 2005; PAL: 22 April 2005; Mac OS X; NA: 22 August 2005; PAL: 7 September 2005; GameCube; NA: 26 October 2005; PAL: 4 November 2005
- Genre: Action-adventure
- Modes: Single-player, multiplayer

Lego Star Wars: The Video Game (sometimes simply called Lego Star Wars) is a 2005 action-adventure video game based on the Lego Star Wars theme of Lego construction toys, and the first installment in the Lego video game franchise developed by Traveller's Tales, which would develop many future Lego titles from that point on. It was first released on 29 March 2005. It is a Lego video game adaptation of the prequel trilogy of George Lucas' movie franchise of the same name: The Phantom Menace, Attack of the Clones and Revenge of the Sith, with a bonus level from A New Hope.

It was developed by Traveller's Tales for the Xbox, PlayStation 2, and Windows. Griptonite Games developed the Game Boy Advance version. These initial versions were published in April 2005. A Macintosh port, developed by Aspyr, was released in August 2005. A GameCube version of the game was released on 26 October 2005. All versions were published by Eidos Interactive and Giant Interactive Entertainment (now TT Games Publishing).

The game received generally favorable reviews from critics. A sequel, Lego Star Wars II: The Original Trilogy, was released in 2006. The two games were compiled in Lego Star Wars: The Complete Saga, released in 2007.

== Gameplay ==
Anakin Skywalker flips over two droids, with several battle droids looking on. Studs, the game's currency, are visible on the overhead ledge and at the far right of the screen.

Gameplay in Lego Star Wars is geared towards family play, and does not feature a game-over scenario. Given a specific set of characters in each scenario, based on a scene from each of the movies, up to two players can control them, using their different abilities. By walking up to another friendly character, the player can switch control over to that character; this interaction is necessary in order to use another character's abilities to complete certain puzzles.

Lego Studs, small coin-like collectibles which serve as the game's currency, can be collected by finding them, smashing or using the force on certain objects, or defeating enemies. Studs increase in value based on color, silver is the least valuable at only 10 points, going up to gold, valued at 100 points, blue at 1,000, and the rarest, purple worth 10,000. Players also have a health meter consisting of four hearts that gets depleted if they get injured or shot at. When they lose all their hearts, their character is broken apart and they lose studs (as opposed to lives). These studs can be spent on unlocking new characters for Free Play mode, hints for playing the game, and cheats. Certain segments of the game feature players controlling spaceships flying on a flat plane. There are also several minikit canisters hidden throughout each level that, when collected, combine to form a vehicle.

When the player first starts the game, they must first complete Chapter 1 of The Phantom Menace ("Negotiations"). However, once that Chapter is completed, the player may choose to play any unlocked levels from the other two movies in their desired order.

Completing all the game's levels with full stud bars will unlock an additional chapter based on the opening scene of A New Hope, which features a 'prototype' Darth Vader, who uses Anakin's fighting style, and a Stormtrooper whose movements are identical to the Clone Troopers.

The background music is the same music used in the Star Wars movies, but as the game was released before Episode III's soundtrack, music from the original trilogy (1977, 1980 and 1983) was used for that movie's levels. For instance, the alternate soundtrack for the "Binary Sunset" was used in the second Chapter of Episode III, while "The Battle of Endor I" was used in Chapter 6, "Princess Leia's Theme" for Chapter 5 and "The Battle of Yavin" was used in Chapters 1 and 3. In The Complete Saga, the tracks that played during gameplay of that episode were replaced with ones from Episode III, although the music for the original trilogy remained in those episodes' cutscenes.

=== Characters ===
Lego Star Wars contains a total of 59 playable characters for LEGO Star Wars; 56 in the GameCube, PS2, Xbox, and PC versions. The three missing are Gungan, Tusken Raider, and STAP, playable in the GBA version, though the Gungan and STAP are only available through cheat codes. The playable characters are modeled like actual Lego parts and, on dying, they fall to pieces and also lose studs. There is a wide variety of characters included in the game, all of which are unlocked by completing levels or by purchasing them at Dexter's Diner. Characters are divided into groups according to certain skills. For instance, Jedi and Sith can double-jump, use lightsabers, and have control of The Force, which they can use to activate or lift Lego objects or defeat certain enemies. Darth Maul has a double-ended lightsaber which improves his defense from laser fire. Jar Jar Binks, General Grievous and his bodyguard have the super-jump, which allows them to reach obstacles that the Jedi and Sith can not jump to. Characters like Padmé Amidala and clone troopers, who carry blasters, have the ability to grapple to reach higher places. Droids, while unarmed, can travel through the game without being intentionally attacked by enemy characters. Protocol droids and astromech droids can open special doors. Characters such as Boba Fett and Young Anakin can fit into tight places. Every character, other than the PK Droid, Gonk Droid (whose only ability is that they are never killed by enemies), and Chancellor Palpatine, has a special ability.

Unlocked characters can be imported into the game's sequel, Lego Star Wars II: The Original Trilogy, as an extra called "Use Old Save", which costs 250,000 Lego Studs, and can be used in its character creator function.

Because the game is based on the prequel trilogy (1999, 2002, 2005), many characters from the original Star Wars trilogy (1977, 1980 and 1983) are not shown, and appear in the sequel Lego Star Wars II: The Original Trilogy. However, if the player unlocks the last level (a preview of Episode IV), Darth Vader, a stormtrooper, a rebel trooper and Princess Leia become available. Original trilogy characters Chewbacca, Obi-Wan Kenobi, Yoda, Darth Sidious, C-3PO, and R2-D2 are unlockable in the game since they also appear in the prequel trilogy.

None of the characters (with the exception of astromech droids) actually speak in Lego Star Wars: The Video Game. They only mumble and grunt. This was carried over to Lego Star Wars II: The Original Trilogy, Lego Star Wars: The Complete Saga, and Lego Star Wars III: The Clone Wars. Lego Star Wars: The Skywalker Saga includes "Mumble Mode", an extra feature allowing players to switch between the game's original voice acting and having the characters mumble and grunt, akin to the style of older Lego Star Wars video games.

=== Free Play ===
Once a level has been cleared in Story Mode, the player may play through that level again in Free Play Mode. In this mode, players can choose to play through the level with their choice of unlocked characters randomly selected by the program based on their abilities. At any point, the player can rotate instantly between each of the chosen characters/vehicles to access areas not accessible during the Story Mode and obtain hidden extras. No story cut scenes appear in this mode. Additionally, vehicle based levels do not offer Free Play Mode.

=== Dexter's Diner ===
Dexter's Diner is the game's hub world, where the player chooses what level to enter, or they can enter the Parking Lot to view any vehicles whose parts they have found and pieced together. The parts to these vehicles are contained in 10 mini-kit canisters which are hidden throughout each level. Battles often take place in the Parking Lot between canon-good and canon-evil characters, such as Jedi and Sith, respectively. At the diner counter, the player may purchase, or enter codes, to unlock extras in exchange for Lego studs they have collected by playing through the levels.

=== Game Boy Advance version ===
The Game Boy Advance version behaves differently than the console versions. It is played from an isometric perspective with only one player, who controls one of 15 playable characters through story scenarios across the prequel trilogy, battling enemies, completing objectives and getting from one place to another. The levels are not evenly divided across the three Episodes, with Episode II having the fewest levels. Each level is divided into multiple sections that serve as checkpoints should the player's character fall apart, and players are given a longer health meter that they must prevent from depleting to continue. Each character possesses a special ability that is constrained by a stamina meter not found in the console version. Players can also find Jawas in certain levels who will sell the player health or stamina upgrades, as well as a maintenance droid that can prevent death once. These upgrades are purchased using studs collected in the level and do not carry over to other levels.

All boss battles are primarily against villains with lightsabers, and call for heavy button mashing to win, especially when players can exclusively get caught in lightsaber blade locks that must be won to inflict extra damage. Other characters have different attack abilities that are not in the console versions, such as blaster-wielding characters able to fire charged shots and astromech droids being able to drop proton mines that would damage enemies on contact. Players are also encouraged to use other characters' abilities in free-play to discover secret areas and find Death Star plans, which replace minikits in the console version. At the end of each level, players are rewarded and ranked for how many enemies they defeated, how many blaster bolts they deflected, how many studs they collected and how many Death Star plans they found.

== Plot ==
The plot of the game is a humorous Lego retelling of Star Wars: Episode I – The Phantom Menace, Star Wars: Episode II – Attack of the Clones, and Star Wars: Episode III – Revenge of the Sith, as well as a bonus level with the opening of Star Wars: Episode IV – A New Hope from the viewpoint of Darth Vader aboard the Tantive IV.

== Development ==
In 2003, Traveller's Tales started the work on the game with assistance from Lego Interactive, who would also publish the game. After The Lego Group left the gaming industry and closed down Lego Interactive in 2004, a small team of former Lego Interactive employees went on to found their own publishing company, Giant Interactive Entertainment, and would be able to publish all future Lego titles, including Lego Star Wars: The Video Game.

The game was revealed at the 2004 San Diego Comic-Con on 24 July, with Traveller's Tales announced as developer, and Giant Interactive Entertainment and LucasArts co-publishing the game, and it would be released for the PlayStation 2, Xbox, Windows and Game Boy Advance. On 23 August, Eidos Interactive announced they would distribute the game worldwide except in Japan.

Several levels were cut from the game during development. "Bounty Hunter Pursuit" was a level based around the Coruscant speeder chase scene with bounty hunter Zam Wessell seen at the beginning of Attack of the Clones. Cutting this level resulted in Attack of the Clones only having five levels compared to the six levels for the other two films, with the first level of Episode II picking up the story with Obi-Wan Kenobi's visit to Kamino. "Anakin's Flight" was a level based around Anakin Skywalker flying a Naboo N-1 starfighter during the space battle against the Trade Federation battleship seen in The Phantom Menace. "Boga Chase" was based around the scene in Revenge of the Sith where Obi-Wan Kenobi chases General Grievous while riding a Boga. "Asteroid Dogfight" was based around the Attack of the Clones scene where Obi-Wan Kenobi chases Jango Fett through the asteroid ring above Geonosis. "Bounty Hunter Pursuit" was later included as part of the Attack of the Clones levels in Lego Star Wars: The Complete Saga, with "Anakin's Flight" also being included as a bonus level.

The game went gold on 23 March 2005 and would be released for the PlayStation 2, Game Boy Advance and Windows in North America on 29 March 2005. The Xbox version followed in April. In the same month, it was announced that Eidos' Japanese branch would publish and distribute the PlayStation 2 and Game Boy Advance versions of the game in Japan on 7 July 2005. In October 2005, Eidos and Giant/TT Games announced a GameCube version which was released the following week.

== Reception and legacy ==
Reception

Aggregate score
Aggregator	Score				
Aggregator	GBA	GameCube	PC	PS2	Xbox
Metacritic	75/100	79/100	77/100	78/100	76/100

Review scores
Publication	Score				
Publication	GBA	GameCube	PC	PS2	Xbox
Computer Gaming World			3.5/5		
Electronic Gaming Monthly				7.17/10	7.17/10
Eurogamer				8/10	
Famitsu	28/40			30/40	
Game Informer				7.5/10	7.5/10
GameRevolution				B	B
GameSpot	7.5/10	7.6/10	7.6/10	7.6/10	7.6/10
GameSpy	2.5/5	4.5/5	4.5/5	4.5/5	4.5/5
GameTrailers			7.5/10	7.5/10	7.5/10
IGN	8/10	8/10	7.8/10	8/10	8/10
Nintendo Power	3.2/5	6.5/10			
Official U.S. PlayStation Magazine				4/5	
Official Xbox Magazine (US)					7/10
PC Gamer (US)			75%		
Detroit Free Press					3/4
The Sydney Morning Herald				4.5/5	
Strana Igr			8/10		

The game received "favorable" reviews on all platforms according to the review aggregation website Metacritic. In Japan, where the Game Boy Advance and PlayStation 2 versions were ported for release on 7 July 2005, Famitsu gave it a score of 30 out of 40 for the latter, and 28 out of 40 for the former.

The Sydney Morning Herald gave the PlayStation 2 version four-and-a-half stars out of five, saying, "This Lego retelling of the prequels is both a loving tribute and an amusing parody." The New York Times gave the PC, PS2 and Xbox versions a favourable review, saying, "There's a goofy pleasure in seeing animated Lego figures pantomime scenes from the movies, and the game's puzzles and battles are undemanding but fun." Detroit Free Press gave the Xbox version three stars out of four, saying that "with more than 30 playable characters from the movies and loads of goodies to unlock, Lego Star Wars is more than just kids' fodder. It's a great Star Wars game."

Computer Games Magazine gave the PC version four stars out of five, saying, "It's too easy, and over too soon, but for $30 it's nearly a complete childhood on a CD." GamePro said of the PS2 version, "The gameplay isn't going to challenge hardcore gamers as the enemies simply aren't that tough, but the presentation really shines." Louis Bedigian of GameZone gave the same PS2 version 8.5 out of 10, saying, "This is one game, perhaps the only game, where it's a compliment to say that the graphics are blocky." Code Cowboy gave the Xbox version eight out of ten, saying that the game was "made for kids, but you'd have to be pretty jaded and close-minded to ignore the fun that's to be had by playing this game." Natalie Romano later gave the GameCube version 8.3 out of 10, saying, "For the young crowd the game is wonderfully accessible and for the older crowd it will not fail to pull you into its charming interpretation of the Star Wars saga's prequels." However, Edge gave the same PS2 version a score of seven out of ten, saying, "Kids are often underestimated, but that doesn't mean their games should be. Lego Star Wars has an appeal that goes beyond age, even if it's one that rarely goes beyond 20 minutes at a time." The Russian magazine Strana Igr described the game as "not only for fans, but for all players with a sense of humor", rating it 8/10.

During the 9th Annual Interactive Achievement Awards, Lego Star Wars received a nomination for "Family Game of the Year", which was ultimately awarded to Guitar Hero.

The game was the thirteenth best-selling game of 2005. Figures released by The NPD Group show the PlayStation 2 version as the tenth best-selling single-platform title of 2005. The game's worldwide sales total exceeded 3.3 million units in March 2006 and 6.7 million in May 2009. In the U.S., the Game Boy Advance version alone sold 580,000 units and earned $17 million by August 2006. During the period between January 2000 and August 2006, it was the 49th highest-selling game launched for the Game Boy Advance, Nintendo DS or PlayStation Portable in that country.

The PlayStation 2 version received a "Double Platinum" sales award from the Entertainment and Leisure Software Publishers Association (ELSPA), indicating sales of at least 600,000 units in the UK. By July 2006, the same console version had sold 1 million units in the U.S. alone. NextGen ranked it as the 54th highest-selling game launched for the PlayStation 2, Xbox or GameCube between January 2000 and July 2006 in that country.

The game's sequel, Lego Star Wars II: The Original Trilogy, was released in September 2006. It follows the events of the first three original Star Wars films A New Hope (1977), The Empire Strikes Back (1980), and Return of the Jedi (1983). Lego Star Wars II: The Original Trilogy and its predecessor, Lego Star Wars: The Video Game were compiled in Lego Star Wars: The Complete Saga, released in 2007. That game was also successful. Lego Star Wars III: The Clone Wars was released in March 2011, based on the 2008 animated Clone Wars film, and its follow-up television series of the same name. Lego Star Wars: The Force Awakens, based on the 2015 film of the same name, was released in June 2016, and Lego Star Wars: The Skywalker Saga, which depicts all nine films in the Skywalker Saga, including the three featured in Lego Star Wars: The Video Game, and was released on 5 April 2022. It also featured the playable films from The Complete Saga and Lego Star Wars: The Force Awakens, along with the other two films of the trilogy, The Last Jedi and The Rise of Skywalker.
