= Lego Star Wars: The Skywalker Saga =

2022 video game

- Developer: Traveller's Tales
- Publisher: Warner Bros. Games
- Director: James McLoughlin
- Producer: James Norton
- Designer: Arthur Parsons
- Programmer: Ben Klages
- Artist: John Lomax
- Writer: James Pugh
- Composer: Simon Withenshaw
- Series: Lego Star Wars
- Engine: NTT
- Platforms: Nintendo Switch; PlayStation 4; PlayStation 5; Windows; Xbox One; Xbox Series X/S
- Release: 5 April 2022
- Genre: Action-adventure
- Modes: Single-player, multiplayer

Lego Star Wars: The Skywalker Saga is a 2022 Lego-themed action-adventure game developed by Traveller's Tales and published by Warner Bros. Games. It is the sixth installment in the Lego Star Wars video game series. The game adapts all nine entries in the Skywalker Saga series of films, with additional characters based on other Star Wars films and television series released as downloadable content.

The Skywalker Saga was released on 5 April 2022 for Nintendo Switch, PlayStation 4, PlayStation 5, Windows, Xbox One, and Xbox Series X/S. It received generally favorable reviews from critics, with praise for its graphics, level design and humor; mixed opinions were directed at its side content and combat, while its technical issues and lack of character customization and online multiplayer were criticized. The game sold more than 3.2 million copies within two weeks of its release.

== Gameplay ==
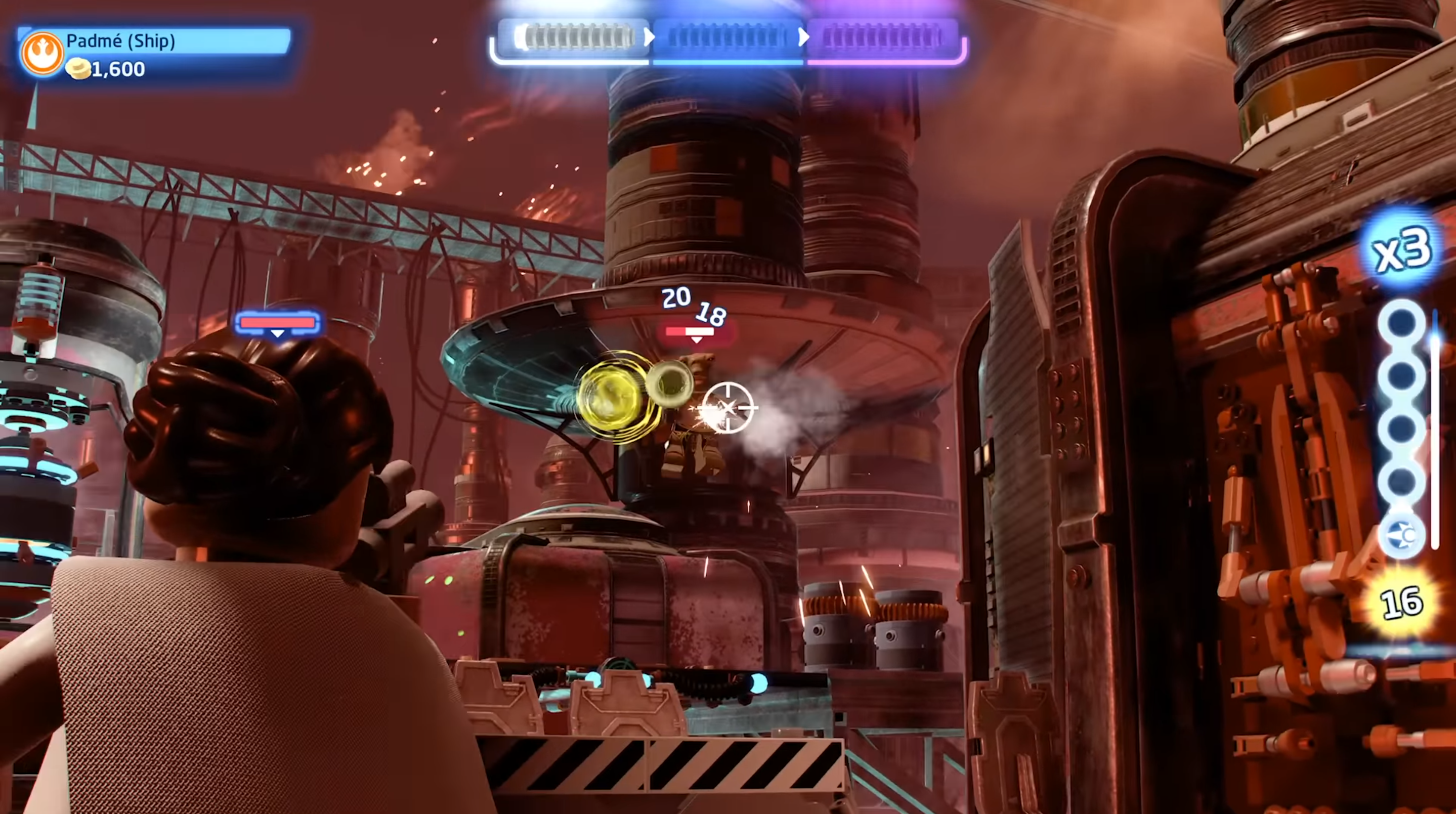
Padmé Amidala battling a Geonosian in a level based on Attack of the Clones

Unlike most Lego video games, in which players have to advance through the story in a linear order, players can choose to start the game from any of the three Skywalker Saga trilogies and complete them in any order they wish. All nine episodes of the Skywalker Saga are represented in the game, in comparison to the first six episodes (I-VI) represented in Lego Star Wars: The Complete Saga (2007). Each episode contains five main story missions, totaling 45 levels, as opposed to six levels in previous games. There are short pre-levels between the five main levels that advance the story forward but do not feature collectibles like minikits or True Jedi. Combat has been revamped from previous titles, such as lightsaber wielders using a variety of combos with light attacks, heavy attacks, and Force moves, and blaster characters having an over-the-shoulder camera. The game features 380 playable characters, not necessarily restricted to the nine Skywalker Saga films.

Similar to Lego Star Wars: The Force Awakens (2016), the game's hub is not a single area, such as the Mos Eisley Cantina in Lego Star Wars: The Complete Saga, but a wide range of fully explorable planets filled with many iconic Star Wars landmarks. Planets and moons featured in the game include Naboo, Tatooine, Coruscant, Kamino, Geonosis, Kashyyyk, Utapau, Mustafar, Yavin 4, Hoth, Dagobah, Bespin, Endor, Jakku, Takodana, D'Qar, Starkiller Base, Ahch-To, Cantonica, Crait, Ajan Kloss, Pasaana, Kijimi, Kef Bir, and Exegol. Many ships have freely explorable areas in the hub as well, such as Capital Ships and the Death Star. Random encounters may occur in the game's hub world. For example, a Rebel Ship could suddenly jump out of hyperspace and send a fleet of X-Wings after the player. Players can choose to engage in dogfights with them or continue onward to progress the story.

Lego Star Wars: The Skywalker Saga does not feature a character customization tool unlike many previous Lego video games. The game includes Mumble Mode, an extra feature allowing players to switch between the game's original voice acting and having the characters mumble and grunt, akin to the style of older Lego video games.

== Development ==
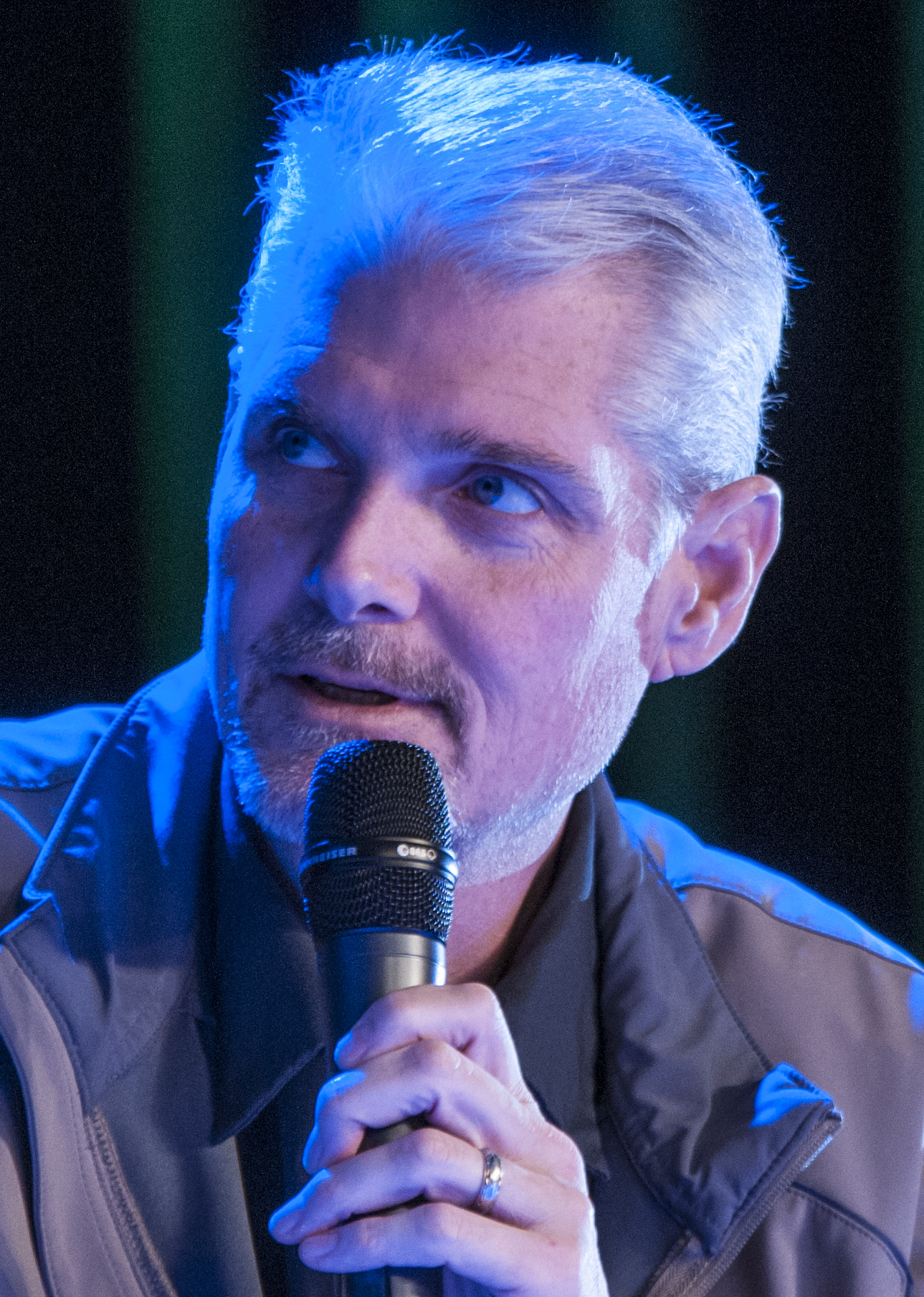
The game marks the final acting credit of Tom Kane, due to his retirement in the wake of his stroke in November 2020 and his death in May 2026.

The Walt Disney Company and Lucasfilm had not shared significant details of the film Star Wars: The Rise of Skywalker with the game team before the film's release. In the meantime, TT Games worked on other aspects of the game until Lucasfilm shared more details. The game is developed in TT Games' new proprietary game engine, NTT (pronounced "entity").

On 20 January 2022, a report published by Polygon detailed the amount of crunch that occurred since the game began development back in late 2017, including dozens inside the company being at odds with management, due to expressing frustration over tight development schedules, the company's crunch culture, and outdated development tools. In addition, the use of NTT was controversial within the company, as many employees had been pushing to instead use Unreal Engine 5. NTT turned out to be difficult to use, with some animations taking hours more to produce than they would on the old engine. As a result, Lego Star Wars: The Skywalker Saga ended up being the only game developed by Traveller's Tales to use NTT, with the company deciding to use Unreal Engine going forward for their future projects.

Like Lego Star Wars: The Force Awakens, Lego Star Wars: The Skywalker Saga features original voice acting, with some actors reprising their roles from the films and television series.

== Release ==
Lego Star Wars: The Skywalker Saga was first teased to be in development by Lucasfilm sound editor Matthew Wood at Star Wars Celebration Chicago. An announcement trailer premiered at E3 2019 during Microsoft's press conference. A second trailer showing one scene from all nine movies was released on 20 December to coincide with the release of The Rise of Skywalker.

On 7 May 2020, the release date was revealed as 20 October 2020 through a trailer posted on the official Star Wars YouTube channel. On the same day, the original video was made private and a new video, in which the release date was cut out, was uploaded. At Gamescom: Opening Night Live in August 2020, it was announced that the game would release in Q1/Q2 2021 with additional versions on the PlayStation 5 and Xbox Series X/S. On 2 April 2021, it was announced that the game had been delayed, with no further release window specified. On 25 August 2021, during Gamescom, a second gameplay trailer was released along with the announcement that the game will be released in early 2022. On 20 January 2022, a gameplay trailer was released, officially revealing the release date as 5 April 2022.

Before release, players were able to pre-order either the standard or deluxe edition of the game. The latter comes with all additional character packs, and a Luke Skywalker minifigure with "blue milk".

In May 2022, a month after the game was released, a patch was pushed out to address major glitches and added the Venator, Invisible Hand, Home One and the Fulminatrix as new unlockable capital ships.

=== Downloadable content ===
On 7 March 2022, seven downloadable content (DLC) packs were announced, which were released in the weeks following the game's launch. These initial packs make up the Character Collection 1 and are included in the Deluxe Edition and the later-released Galactic Edition. In addition to the seven packs, a classic minifigure version of Obi-Wan Kenobi was included as an exclusive character for any digital purchases, including pre-orders.

- On 5 April, four character packs were released alongside the base game. The Mandalorian Season 1 adds five playable characters: Din Djarin, Greef Karga, Cara Dune, IG-11, and Kuiil; Grogu is also included as a non-playable companion for Djarin. Solo: A Star Wars Story features younger versions of Han Solo, Chewbacca, and Lando Calrissian (as seen in the film), as well as Qi'ra, Tobias Beckett, and Enfys Nest. Classic Characters adds the original minifigure versions of Luke Skywalker, Princess Leia, Han Solo, Darth Vader, and Lando Calrissian. Trooper Pack includes five stormtrooper specialist variants: the Death Trooper, Incinerator Trooper, Range Trooper, Imperial Shore Trooper, and Mimban Stormtrooper. The latter two packs were only made available at launch to players who had pre-ordered the game, and were released for purchase individually at later dates: Classic Characters on 19 April, and Trooper Pack on 4 May (Star Wars Day).
- On 19 April, the Rogue One: A Star Wars Story character pack was released, adding Jyn Erso, Bodhi Rook, Cassian Andor, K-2SO, Chirrut Îmwe, Baze Malbus, and Orson Krennic to the game.
- On 4 May, the final two character packs were released. The Mandalorian Season 2 includes the playable characters Ahsoka Tano, Boba Fett, Bo-Katan Kryze, Fennec Shand, and Moff Gideon, while The Bad Batch adds Hunter, Wrecker, Tech, Crosshair, and Echo.

On 9 September 2022, at the D23 Expo Presentation, a Galactic Edition of the game was announced, which was released on 1 November. This version comes with the first seven DLC packs and a new Character Collection 2, which contains six character packs, all of which were also made available for purchase separately.

- On 1 November, The Clone Wars and Lego Star Wars: Summer Vacation TV Special packs were released. The former includes Captain Rex, Darth Maul, Asajj Ventress, Savage Opress, and Gar Saxon, while the latter features holiday-themed versions of Obi-Wan Kenobi, Darth Vader, Finn, Emperor Palpatine, and R2-D2.
- On 15 November, the Rebels and Obi-Wan Kenobi packs were released. The former introduces Sabine Wren, Ezra Bridger, Grand Admiral Thrawn, Kanan Jarrus, and Hera Syndulla, while the latter includes new variations of Obi-Wan Kenobi and Darth Vader (based on their appearances in the show), as well as the Third Sister, the Grand Inquisitor, and the Fifth Brother.
- On 29 November, the final two packs were released. Andor features the playable characters Cassian Andor, Luthen Rael, Syril Karn, Dedra Meero, and Bix Caleen, while The Book of Boba Fett adds Black Krrsantan, Cad Bane, Cobb Vanth, Peli Motto, and The Armorer to the game.

On 4 May 2023, a free DLC was released for the game, featuring Luke Starkiller, a concept character created by Ralph McQuarrie who evolved into Luke Skywalker.

== Reception ==
Reception

Aggregate scores
Aggregator	Score
Metacritic	NS: 82/100; PC: 78/100; PS5: 82/100; XONE: 76/100; XSXS: 82/100
OpenCritic	88% recommend

Review scores
Publication	Score
Destructoid	7.5/10
Electronic Gaming Monthly	4/5
Game Informer	8/10
GameRevolution	7/10
GameSpot	7/10
GamesRadar+	4.5/5
IGN	8/10
Nintendo Life	9/10
PC Gamer (US)	77/100
Push Square	8/10
Shacknews	9/10
The Guardian	4/5
Pure Xbox	8/10

Lego Star Wars: The Skywalker Saga received "generally favorable" reviews, according to review aggregator Metacritic. OpenCritic determined that 88% of critics recommended the game.

IGN gave the game an 8 out of 10, saying "LEGO Star Wars: The Skywalker Saga provides some rollicking reimaginings of Star Wars's most iconic moments and seats them inside a series of interplanetary playgrounds that are dense with discovery and entertaining diversions." Destructoid gave the game a 7.5 out of 10 and wrote, "Lego Star Wars: The Skywalker Saga doesn't reinvent the wheel and the subject matter is limited because the narrative mostly adheres to the film trilogies [...] but it's a fun way to relive them as an adult and show them to kids at the same time." Game Informer praised the game's story-focused levels, combat, and character unlocks, stating, "While nailing the little moments, the immense scale of the project appears to have been too wide for TT Games to harness, as some of the content is uncharacteristically dull or uneven [...] Despite being periodically uneventful, the Skywalker Saga is a thorough and fun examination of all three Star Wars movie trilogies." Shacknews gave the title a 9 out of 10, praising its humor, combat features, voice acting, and visuals while taking minor issue with the excessive collectibles and challenges. Nintendo Life also praised its campaign, pacing, side content, co-op, humor, and music while criticizing some performance issues. Push Square similarly praised the game while lamenting occasional camera issues, performance dips, and the lack of online co-op. Pure Xbox likewise criticized the lack of online co-op, but did not notice any performance issues, and praised the graphics as well as its "endlessly enjoyable gameplay". Kotaku called it "one of the best Star Wars games ever made", praising its graphics and humor.

EGM criticized the game for not including a more streamlined gameplay loop and coherent map system, but concluded that "Lego Star Wars: The Skywalker Saga embraces a lot of what made earlier Lego games fun and a few that made them frustrating, while adding a new layer of polish and flair that's sure to please fans." GameRevolution stated that the game "does more than enough right" but noted that its scope was "undermined by the lackluster implementation of certain ideas that are supposed to be its big selling points, such as its improved combat and new camera angle." GameSpot lauded the combat mechanics, roster of character types, visuals, and humor, but criticized some "empty" campaign objectives, repetitive content in hub areas, and limited character upgrades. GamesRadar+ commended the "gorgeous" visuals, multiplayer mode, and the amount of content on offer, but felt that the gameplay was too simplistic, concluding, "[The Skywalker Saga] is funny, playable, technically stupendous, massive and immensely authentic, it's just a shame it feels so shallow and childish at times." PC Gamer criticized the combat and boss fights as feeling elongated, the lack of online co-op, and lamented the reported crunch during development, but ultimately stated, "The Skywalker Saga is an impressive package, successfully adapting some of the most iconic sci-fi movies of all time with equal amounts playful mockery of and loving adherence to the source material."

=== Sales ===
It had the biggest launch of a Lego game on Steam. The retail version of the game debuted at No. 1 on the UK software sales chart in its week of release. It had the biggest launch ever for a Lego game in the UK, breaking the record previously set by Lego Indiana Jones: The Original Adventures (2008).

The game sold more than 3.2 million copies within two weeks of its release, surpassing global sales of all previous Lego console game launches. The game had achieved more than 5 million copies sold as of June 2022. It became the fifth-best-selling game of 2022 in the US.

=== Accolades ===
Year	Award	Category	Result	Ref(s).
2022	Golden Joystick Awards	Best Multiplayer Game	Nominated	
2022	British Academy Children's Awards 2022	Game	Nominated	
2022	The Game Awards 2022	Best Family Game	Nominated	
2023	The Steam Awards	Sit Back and Relax	Won	
2023	19th British Academy Games Awards	Animation	Nominated	
2023	19th British Academy Games Awards	Family	Nominated	
