= Dagobah =

Fictional planet in the Star Wars saga

- Star Wars location
- First appearance: The Empire Strikes Back
- Last appearance: Star Wars: The Clone Wars
- Created by: George Lucas
- Genre: Science-fiction

In-universe information
- Type: Gaia-type world
- Race: Tash
- Character: Yoda
- Terrain: Water; Forested; Petrified forest; Bayou; Wetlands; Dry uplands
- Oceans: 0
- Sun(s): Dagobah Prime
- Grid Coordinates: N-25

Dagobah is a fictional planet and eponymous star system appearing in the Star Wars films The Empire Strikes Back, Return of the Jedi, and Revenge of the Sith, and other media. It is depicted as a world of murky swamps, steaming bayous, and jungles, resembling Earth during the Carboniferous period. Dagobah is 14,410 kilometers in diameter with an orbital period of 341 days. Dagobah's climate and atmosphere consists of two seasons: a dry season, where the uplands become too hot for most life forms to survive; and a wet season, consisting of violent lightning storms, dense fog, and long periods of torrential rainfall. The Tash were a sentient species native to Dagobah.

The Dagobah System lies within the Dagobah subsector of the Sluis sector, located in the Outer Rim Territories galactic quadrant region, 50,250 light-years from Coruscant. The sun was called Dagobah Prime. It is noted as being one of the purest places in the galaxy, incredibly strong in the living force, and being chosen by Jedi Yoda as the planet to go into exile on to mask his presence and avoid discovery by the Galactic Empire.

== Depiction ==
The similarly mono-thematic "swampy, fog-shrouded planet of Mimban" appearing in the novel Splinter of the Mind's Eye, published between the films Star Wars: A New Hope and The Empire Strikes Back, "might have inspired the production design for Dagobah".

=== Film ===
Dagobah was originally featured in the 1980 film The Empire Strikes Back. In its first appearance, the main protagonist of the film, Luke Skywalker, is attempting to land his X-wing starfighter on the planet and is met with a dense fog causing him to crash land in a small bayou. Shortly after his landing, the Jedi Master Yoda is introduced during his time in exile. Yoda reluctantly agrees to train Skywalker and during his training many aspects of the planet's environment are utilized. Moss-covered rocks are used for training in telekinesis, the undergrowth makes treks through the jungles more challenging, and vines hanging from tall trees are used as means to get across small bodies of water and other obstacles. Skywalker is shown to sense the strength of the Force in a particular cave on the planet which Yoda tells him to go into. Inside the cave, Skywalker is met with a mental challenge the dark side of the Force developed for him. After realizing that his friends are in danger at Cloud City, Skywalker terminates his training and departs from the planet, with Obi-Wan Kenobi thinking that Skywalker might be their last hope, but Yoda reminds him that "there is another".

The planet is also seen briefly in Return of the Jedi to depict Yoda's death and is featured in a deleted scene from Revenge of the Sith showing Yoda's arrival on the planet. George Lucas reportedly said it was removed so the film would not have "too many endings." The scene was released under the title "Exile to Dagobah" on the film's DVD.

=== Other media ===
The Clone Wars featured Dagobah in a sixth-season episode, in which Yoda traveled to the planet as part of his own training to gain immortality through the Force.

In the Star Wars expanded universe, Yoda confronted a Bpfasshi Dark Jedi on Dagobah, some years before the events in The Empire Strikes Back, and the cave where the Dark Jedi died became strong in the dark side of the Force. Star Wars Tales later retconned this event to take place earlier, with another Jedi of Yoda's species named Minch replacing Yoda. Dagobah was also visited by the main characters of the Galaxy of Fear series, where it was home for a time to a tribe of cannibals. During the events of Jedi Knight: Jedi Academy, a team of Jedi Knights from the New Jedi Order visit Dagobah, to find the cave drained of its former menace.

Dagobah appears as a hub world in Lego Star Wars: The Skywalker Saga.

After the events of Return of the Jedi, the New Republic founded a military base on one of the greatest mountains of the planet, named 'Mount Yoda' after the Jedi Master.

== Description ==
Largely looked over by the Galactic Republic, Dagobah is the only habitable planet in the system of the same name within the Sluis sector. A cloudy and swampy world of dense foliage, countless living things of all sizes, including reptiles, amphibians, and swarming insects, fill its environs with a hum of constant noise. All of its creatures appear relatively unintelligent. Larger life-forms occupy cave-like hollows formed by petrified forests. Carnivorous "gnarltrees" reproduce as spiderlike mobile creatures which eventually metamorphose into their rooted form. The planet is also noted for being strong with the Force.

== Analysis ==
Several scholars have interpreted Dagobah as the station of initiation when applying Joseph Campbell's schema of the hero's journey, going back to ancient myths, to the character of Luke Skywalker: the hero retreats "from society to a world of more primal symbols where he must conquer his own darkness and return to the social world with a new redemptive knowledge." Dagobah is described as "like something out of a dream" and corresponds to "a spiritual plane". This primordial and isolated place of power, which seems hostile to civilization - the technological R2-D2 "is spat out unceremoniously" - is "a sanctuary of nature" and "creates a space, which like no other, influences the conception and development of the hero". Leah Deyneka linked the teeming nature of Dagobah with the "enchanted forest or sacred grove" which "figures frequently in fairy tales and myths; trees are believed to hold special powers and forests symbolize mastery and transformation." Miles Booy saw Dagobah as a "richly constructed [...] semiotic environment" which "does not point towards prior films but to widely circulated discourses concerning human consciousness". Its jungle and "dark swamp infested by reptiles" may be considered an image of the subconscious, with Yoda fulfilling the role of the analyst who "raises to the surface" what has been submerged.

Dan Catalano commented that Dagobah as "an eerie location filled with strange wildlife and shrouded in as much mystery as fog", removed from the technology-filled galaxy, is a fitting device to underline Yoda's status as a "Wise Man archetype" in the tradition of Merlin, who likewise can be found in places of "wild nature" in Arthurian myths.

Booy commented that within Star Wars "[n]o other environment attempts such imagery as Dagobah is constructed of" and that "Dagobah would also come to be the basis for [...] the notion that the film constitutes a form of mythology."

== See also ==
- List of Star Wars planets and moons
- Carboniferous
