= Lego Star Wars II: The Original Trilogy =

2006 video game

- Developers: Traveller's Tales; Amaze Entertainment (DS/GBA); Universomo (J2ME)
- Publishers: LucasArts; Feral Interactive (OS X); THQ Wireless (J2ME)
- Director: Jon Burton
- Programmer: John Hodskinson
- Artist: James Cunliffe
- Composer: David Whittaker (Note: Original music composed by John Williams)
- Series: Lego Star Wars
- Platforms: Game Boy Advance; GameCube; Windows; Nintendo DS; PlayStation 2; PlayStation Portable; Xbox; Xbox 360; J2ME; OS X
- Release: UK: 11 September 2006; NA: 12 September 2006; EU: 13 September 2006; AU: 15 September 2006; UK: 15 September 2006 (PS2); EU: 10 November 2006 (PSP); J2ME; EU: 5 January 2007; OS X; WW: 4 May 2007
- Genre: Action-adventure
- Modes: Single-player, multiplayer

Lego Star Wars II: The Original Trilogy is a 2006 Lego-themed action-adventure game developed by Traveller's Tales and published by LucasArts and TT Games Publishing, and is the sequel to Lego Star Wars: The Video Game (2005). Part of the Lego Star Wars series, it is based on George Lucas' movie franchise of the same name and The Lego Group's Lego Star Wars construction toy line. In contrast to how the original game was based on the prequel trilogy, Lego Star Wars II follows the events of the first three original Star Wars films: A New Hope (1977), The Empire Strikes Back (1980), and Return of the Jedi (1983). The game allows players to assume the roles of over 50 Lego versions of characters from the film series; customized characters can also be created. Camera movement was improved from its predecessor, and the concept of "vehicle levels" was explored more thoroughly. The game was revealed at American International Toy Fair. Promotions for the game were set up at chain stores across the United States.

Lego Star Wars II was released on 11 September 2006, and was a critical and commercial success. It has sold over 8.2 million copies worldwide as of May 2009. It received generally favorable reviews, as critics praised the game for its humorous and "adorable" portrayal of the films and due to preferring the original trilogy over the prequel trilogy. However, the game's low difficulty was more criticized. In addition, the Game Boy Advance and Nintendo DS counterparts developed by Amaze Entertainment were panned, with the DS version being considered to be one of the worst video games of all time. The console game received awards from the British Academy of Film and Television Arts (BAFTA) and Spike TV, among others. A mobile phone adaptation, Lego Star Wars II Mobile, was later developed by Universomo, published by THQ, and released on 5 January 2007. Lego Star Wars II and its predecessor were compiled in Lego Star Wars: The Complete Saga, released later that same year.

== Gameplay ==
In a level based on Dagobah from The Empire Strikes Back (1980), Luke Skywalker is fighting an enemy snake with his lightsaber. Lego studs are scattered around, and R2-D2 is visible in the background.

Lego Star Wars II's gameplay is from a third-person perspective, and takes place in a 3D game world that contains objects, environments, and characters designed to resemble Lego pieces. Its gameplay – a combination of the action-adventure, platform, and sometimes puzzle genres – shares elements with that of Lego Star Wars: The Video Game (2005). While Lego Star Wars followed the events of the Prequel Trilogy: The Phantom Menace (1999), Attack of the Clones (2002), and Revenge of the Sith (2005), Lego Star Wars II is based on the Original Trilogy: A New Hope (1977), The Empire Strikes Back (1980), and Return of the Jedi (1983). The game comically retells the trilogy's events using cutscenes without dialogue. The player assumes the roles of the films' characters, each of whom possesses specific weapons and abilities. At any time, a second player can join the game, by activating a second controller. During gameplay, players can collect Lego studs – small, disk-shaped objects, which serve as the game's currency. The player has a health meter, which is displayed on the game's HUD. The player's health is represented by four hearts; when these hearts are depleted, the player dies, and a small amount of their studs bounce away. However, they instantly respawn and can often re-collect the lost studs.

The game's central location is the Mos Eisley cantina, a spaceport bar on the planet Tatooine. At the counter, the player may use their Lego studs to purchase characters, vehicles, gameplay hints and extras, as well as view unlocked Story cutscenes and activate cheat codes. In a small area outside the cantina, players may view collected vehicles. The game is broken into levels, which are accessed from the cantina; each film is represented by six levels, representing key locations and scenes in that film. The locations include Hoth, Bespin, Dagobah, Tatooine, the Death Star, and Endor. The game also features bonus levels. During play, the player defeats enemies, builds objects out of Lego bricks, and drives vehicles. Certain levels are played entirely while piloting vehicles, including a TIE fighter, a Snowspeeder, and the Millennium Falcon. Levels must first be played in Story Mode. This unlocks the next level as well as a Free Play mode for the recently completed level. Gameplay is identical in the two modes. However, Story Mode restricts playable characters to those followed in the film scenes the levels are based on, while Free Play offers all those unlocked. Levels can be replayed in either mode to collect studs and secret items.

Three types of secret items are available: gold bricks, minikits, and power bricks. Within each level is one hidden power brick. When a power brick is collected, its corresponding extra, such as invincibility or stud multipliers, becomes available for purchase. Each level also contains ten hidden minikits that are ten pieces of a Star Wars vehicle. When all ten have been collected, the player is awarded a gold brick. Collecting a certain number of gold bricks unlocks free rewards, such as a spigot that spews out studs. Gold bricks are also awarded when levels are completed, and when a predefined number of studs is accumulated in a level; ninety-nine gold bricks are available. The vehicles represented by the minikits are displayed outside the cantina. As each vehicle is completed (all ten minikits collected), it becomes available for play in a bonus level.

=== Playable characters ===
68 characters from the films are playable over the course of the game, including variations of Luke Skywalker, Princess Leia, Han Solo, Chewbacca, Obi-Wan Kenobi, Lando Calrissian, R2-D2, C-3PO, Darth Vader, Wicket the Ewok, and Boba Fett. Character abilities have a greater role in Lego Star Wars II than in Lego Star Wars. Certain characters armed with blasters can use a grappling hook in predesignated areas. Characters wielding lightsabers can deflect projectiles, double jump and use the Force. R2-D2, C-3PO, and other droid characters are needed to open particular doors. Small characters like the Ewok and Jawa can crawl through hatches to reach otherwise inaccessible areas. Bounty hunters, such as Boba Fett, may use thermal detonators to destroy otherwise indestructible objects. Sith, like Darth Vader, can use the Force to manipulate black Lego objects. Some characters have unique abilities; for example, Chewbacca can rip enemies' arms from their sockets, Darth Vader can choke enemies with the Force, Princess Leia possesses a slap attack, and Lando Calrissian can use a kung-fu-like attack. Special abilities are often necessary to unlock secrets, and story mode does not always provide characters with needed abilities. This means that some secrets can be found only in free play mode. The player can unlock the "Use Old Save" extra, which imports all unlocked characters from Lego Star Wars for use in free play; however, a Lego Star Wars saved game must be present on the same memory card that contains Lego Star Wars II's save data.

Players can create two customized characters in the Mos Eisley cantina. These characters can be built using both miscellaneous parts and those of unlocked characters; 2,258,163,204 combinations are possible. Entering two cheat codes, publicized by IGN, makes pieces for a Santa Claus character available. The game generates names for the characters based on the pieces used (for example, a character made from pieces of Darth Vader and C-3PO might have the name "Darth-3PO"); alternately, the player may create a name.

== Development ==
Lego Star Wars II was created by the British game developer Traveller's Tales. LucasArts – busy with other projects – had deferred publishing of Lego Star Wars to Eidos Interactive, but regained the "necessary resources" to publish its sequel alongside TT Games Publishing. Lego Star Wars II was created for Microsoft Windows, OS X, Xbox, GameCube, PlayStation 2, Game Boy Advance (GBA), Nintendo DS, PlayStation Portable (PSP), and Xbox 360. Differences exist between platforms: the DS and GBA versions have some different playable characters than the other versions, and the DS and PSP versions support a "Wireless Lobby" for multiplayer gameplay.

Lego Star Wars II uses a modified Lego Star Wars engine. However, many gameplay improvements were made over its predecessor, most notably camera angles and movement. Camera movement in co-op was a specific point of concern, as LucasArts received critical feedback from fans over this issue. Traveller's Tales looked to expand upon the concept of levels completed entirely in vehicles. These "vehicle levels" were explored more thoroughly in Lego Star Wars II than in its predecessor. In response to complaints from fans, LucasArts and Traveller's Tales granted the ability to build bricks to all non-droid characters. Character customization, an entirely new concept, was considered a significant improvement over the original game, and is one of three features highlighted on the game's final back cover. Tom Stone, director at Traveller's Tales, stated of the various improvements made over the original game:

We were surprised and, of course, delighted that the original game was played and enjoyed by so many people ... And with all of the new improvements and features along with the Original Trilogy we're implementing into Lego Star Wars II, we're confident that the new game has what it takes to entertain even more gamers than before.

The designers attempted to recreate the films' characters and events in a "cute" way. Assistant producer Jeff Gullet said that, in the game's recreation of a Return of the Jedi scene where Luke Skywalker "jumps off the plank ... and somersaults onto the skiff", Skywalker "performs an all-out acrobatic routine with all sorts of jumps from the plank. It's hilarious". LucasArts producer David Perkinson said, "unless you've got the heart of the Emperor, you are going to chuckle at many of [the characters] the first time you see them – you just have to. They're so darn cute!"

== Marketing and release history ==
A version of Lego Star Wars II was also published by THQ for mobile phones.

On 2 February 2006, images of the game were leaked to the Internet. However, they were quickly removed, and LucasArts, if telephoned, did not confirm or deny the game's development. The game was formally announced on 10 February, at American International Toy Fair 2006. A preview was later hosted at Electronic Entertainment Expo (E3) 2006. Because the original Lego Star Wars had been well received commercially and critically, selling 3.3 million copies by March 2006 and winning several awards, its sequel was highly anticipated both by fans of the original game and by video game publications such as IGN and GameSpot. Shortly before the game's release, promotions were set up at chain stores across the United States, including Toys "R" Us, Wal-Mart, Target, Best Buy, GameStop, and Circuit City.

In the United Kingdom, Lego Star Wars II was released on 11 September 2006, for PC, Xbox, GameCube, Game Boy Advance, DS, and Xbox 360; on 15 September for PlayStation 2; and on 10 November for PSP. The game was released on 13 September in continental Europe for all platforms except the PSP. The game's North American release fell on 12 September for all platforms, coinciding with the release of the individual two-disc DVD releases of the films on which it was based. The game's Australian release fell on 15 September for all platforms, but the Xbox 360 version was not released in this region. The OS X version of the game was released on 4 May 2007. The PlayStation 2 and Nintendo DS versions were the only versions that saw release in Japan, which occurred on 2 November 2006. The game received a rating of E10+ from the Entertainment Software Rating Board (for "cartoon violence" and "crude humor"), 3+ from PEGI, and A from CERO.

A mobile phone adaptation of the game was developed by Universomo and published by THQ. It was released on 5 January 2007. Several gameplay features – such as two-dimensional graphics, limited character selection, and coverage only of the film Star Wars – distinguish this version of the game from the versions for other platforms. Lego Star Wars and Lego Star Wars II were later compiled in Lego Star Wars: The Complete Saga, developed by Traveller's Tales and published by LucasArts. The Complete Saga incorporated improvements from the sequel into the original game, and expanded the Mos Eisley cantina to allow access to both games' levels. It was created for Windows, PlayStation 3, Xbox 360, Wii, and DS. It was released on 6 November 2007.

== Reception ==
Reception

Aggregate score
Aggregator	Score							
Aggregator	DS	GBA	GameCube	PC	PS2	PSP	Xbox	Xbox 360
Metacritic	47/100	55/100	84/100	86/100	84/100	83/100	85/100	81/100

Review scores
Publication	Score							
Publication	DS	GBA	GameCube	PC	PS2	PSP	Xbox	Xbox 360
1Up.com	N/A	N/A	B	B+	B	B+	B+	B
AllGame	2.5/5	N/A	4/5	4/5	4/5	4/5	4/5	4/5
Electronic Gaming Monthly	N/A	N/A	N/A	N/A	N/A	N/A	N/A	73/100
Game Informer	N/A	N/A	8/10	N/A	8/10	N/A	8/10	8/10
GameSpot	7.3/10	7.3/10	7.7/10	7.7/10	7.7/10	7.7/10	7.7/10	7.7/10
GameSpy	2/5	1.5/5	4.5/5	4.5/5	4.5/5	4.5/5	4.5/5	4.5/5
GameTrailers	N/A	N/A	8.2/10	8.2/10	8.2/10	N/A	8.2/10	8.2/10
IGN	3.5/10	7.8/10	8.4/10	8/10	8.4/10	8/10	8.4/10	8.4/10
Nintendo Power	N/A	N/A	7.5/10	N/A	N/A	N/A	N/A	N/A
Official U.S. PlayStation Magazine	N/A	N/A	N/A	N/A	8/10	7.5/10	N/A	N/A
Official Xbox Magazine (US)	N/A	N/A	N/A	N/A	N/A	N/A	8.5/10	8.5/10
PlayStation: The Official Magazine	N/A	N/A	N/A	N/A	8/10	N/A	N/A	N/A

Upon release, Lego Star Wars II was positively received by critics, who praised its portrayal of the films' characters and events. Nintendo Power staff writer Chris Shepperd claimed that "[t]he adorable Lego adaptations also led to some hilarious story moments: the 'I am your father' scene from The Empire Strikes Back is priceless". Reviewers from GameSpy, 1Up.com, GameSpot, IGN, and PlayStation: The Official Magazine offered similar opinions. Shepperd and Variety's Ben Fritz called the game "adorable". In reviews of the Xbox 360 version, Official Xbox Magazine praised the game's "off-kilter humor", and Electronic Gaming Monthly (EGM) stated that "[y]ou have to give credit to the brilliant blockhead who forced this awesome yet fundamentally bizarro idea on LucasArts." Jeff Bell, corporate vice president of global marketing for Microsoft, commended Lego Star Wars II for expanding the range of consumers for the Xbox 360, noting its family-friendly appeal.

The game was praised as a result of reviewers' preference of the original trilogy over the prequel trilogy. Andrew Reiner of Game Informer said that "comparing [the prequel trilogy] to the films in the original trilogy is similar to comparing Jar Jar Binks to Han Solo". Shepperd praised the level design of Lego Star Wars II, and called its predecessor's environments "sterile". These views were echoed by reviewers from 1Up.com, Variety, GameSpot, GameSpy, Official U.S. PlayStation Magazine (for the PlayStation 2), and BusinessWeek.

Critics were divided on the game's level of difficulty. Fritz claimed that, though Lego Star Wars II provided only a "short journey", it was "loads of fun". GameSpot's Ryan Davis estimated that it could be completed in six hours, but praised its bonus content. GameSpy and 1Up.com's reviewers thought similarly. A review by USA Today's Brett Molina claimed that "[t]he game's difficulty is balanced well enough so kids won't feel too frustrated while older gamers will still find a solid challenge" and gave the game an overall score of 8 out of 10. Official Xbox Magazine's review praised its "weird puzzles". IGN's Jeremy Dunham and Reiner were more critical of the perceived low difficulty.

Critics disliked the game's Game Boy Advance and Nintendo DS versions. Davis believed that the Game Boy Advance version could be completed in two hours. GameSpy staff writer Phil Theobald bemoaned this version's poor controls, easy levels, and vehicle-piloting sections. He concluded that "for goodness sake, [one should] buy one of the [home] console versions". Theobald, Davis, and IGN's Craig Harris criticized the high number of glitches in the DS version.

=== Accolades and sales ===
Lego Star Wars II won and was nominated for numerous awards, and ranked on several video game lists. The official Star Wars website declared Lego Star Wars II to be the best Star Wars-related product of 2006. The game won iParenting Media Awards' "2006 Greatest Products Call", and was placed on Reader's Digest's September 2006 "5 Things We Don't Want You to Miss" list, Time magazine's list of the top ten video games of 2006, and GameSpy's PC "Game of the Year" list. It received the 2006 Game of the Year award from Nick Jr. and IGN (for PC games only). It won Spike TV Video Game Awards 2006's "Best Game Based on a Movie or TV Show", and "Best Gameplay" from the British Academy of Film and Television Arts's 3rd British Academy Games Awards. It received BAFTA nominations in three other categories, including "Best Game". In contrast, the previously poorly received DS version was listed as one of the "tears" on IGN's September 2009 "Cheers & Tears" list of action games for the DS. The editors of Computer Games Magazine named Lego Star War II the fifth-best computer game of 2006, and called it "a superb action/adventure, one with [...] an almost puppy dog-like insistence that you love it." During the 10th Annual Interactive Achievement Awards, Lego Star Wars II received nominations for "Family Game of the Year", "Handheld Game of the Year", "Outstanding Achievement in Animation", and "Outstanding Achievement in Character Performance - Male" (Lego Han Solo).

Lego Star Wars II sold over 1.1 million copies worldwide in its opening week. The PlayStation 2, GameCube, Xbox 360, and Xbox versions were the third, fifth, eighth, and ninth-best selling games of September 2006, respectively. The GameCube, Xbox, and PlayStation 2 versions were the third, eighth, and ninth-best selling games of 2006, respectively. All platforms except PC combined, the game was the third-highest selling of 2006 in the United States, behind Madden NFL 07 and Cars. All platforms combined, the game was the fifth-highest selling of 2006 in the United Kingdom. The GameCube, GBA, and DS versions were the first, second, and fifth best-selling of January 2007 for their respective platforms. By 2 May 2009, the game's worldwide sales had surpassed 8.2 million. It has been certified as part of the budget lines Platinum Hits for the Xbox 360, Greatest Hits for the PlayStation 2 (each represents a worldwide sales total of at least 400,000 on its respective platform), and Player's Choice for the GameCube (250,000).
