= Lego Star Wars: The Force Awakens =

2016 video game

- Developer: TT Fusion
- Publishers: Warner Bros. Interactive Entertainment; Feral Interactive (OS X)
- Directors: Jamie Eden; Pete Gomer; Rob Hewson
- Designers: Tommy Turner; Rory Shafto; Mike Northeast; Ed Marsland; Rich Greer
- Programmers: Tom Matthews; Rian Walters
- Artists: Josh Pickering Pick; Pascal Serra; David Woodman
- Writer: Graham Goring
- Composer: Original music composed by John Williams
- Series: Lego Star Wars
- Platforms: Nintendo 3DS; PlayStation 3; PlayStation 4; PlayStation Vita; Wii U; Windows; Xbox 360; Xbox One; OS X; Android; iOS
- Release: 28 June 2016; OS X 30 June 2016; Android & iOS; 28 July 2016
- Genre: Action-adventure
- Modes: Single-player, multiplayer

Lego Star Wars: The Force Awakens is a 2016 Lego-themed action-adventure game developed by TT Fusion. It is the fifth entry in TT Games' Lego Star Wars series of video games and adapts the events of the 2015 film Star Wars: The Force Awakens. Under license from Lucasfilm, the game was released by Warner Bros. Interactive Entertainment for Nintendo 3DS, PlayStation 3, PlayStation 4, PlayStation Vita, Wii U, Windows, Xbox 360, and Xbox One, on 28 June 2016, and for Android, and iOS, on 28 July 2016. The game was ported and released by Feral Interactive for OS X on 30 June 2016. It was the final Lego game released for PS3, Xbox 360, and Wii U; in addition, its portable version was not only the last Lego release for the 3DS and Vita, but the last portable counterpart developed for any TT-developed Lego title.

In addition to adapting The Force Awakens, the game includes content which covers the period between Return of the Jedi, serving as the game's prologue, and the film. Additional levels and characters, some of them based on other Star Wars films and television series, were released as downloadable content.

== Gameplay ==
The gameplay of Lego Star Wars: The Force Awakens is similar to previous Lego video games. New systems were introduced including Multi-Builds which grant players access to various building options. These options can be destroyed and rebuilt in certain brick-building sections of the game, allowing for new paths to be opened within the game's world. Players can also hide behind cover and engage in "Blaster Battles" with enemies throughout the game. The game features over 200 playable characters, including Rey, Finn, Captain Phasma, Poe Dameron, Han Solo, Kylo Ren and droids, such as C-3PO and BB-8, as well as ships, both regular-sized (which can only be used in certain missions), and miniaturized. Players may freely explore Jakku, Takodana, D'Qar, and Starkiller Base, which all act as mini-open worlds. In addition to adapting the film, the game also bridged the gap between Return of the Jedi and The Force Awakens, with Lucasfilm allowing for creative freedom in the additional content that will explore the characters' backstories.

== Plot ==
The plot closely follows that of Star Wars: The Force Awakens, though with numerous humorous deviations or minor changes to adapt to the two-player co-op gameplay. There is also a prologue that depicts the Battle of Endor, the defeat of Emperor Palpatine, and the destruction of the Death Star II at the end of Return of the Jedi.

== Development ==
In early February 2016, publisher Warner Bros. Interactive Entertainment teased that the company is working on a new title that involved "two of the world's most popular entertainment brands". The game was later leaked by several retailers, before its official announcement on 2 February 2016. Players who purchase the game's Deluxe Edition will receive a season pass to the game and a Lego minifigure of Finn, while players of the PlayStation 3 and PlayStation 4 versions received additional downloadable content, including a character pack and a bonus level, titled the "Droid Character Pack" and the "Phantom Limb Level Pack" respectively. The game was released for Nintendo 3DS, PlayStation 3, PlayStation 4, PlayStation Vita, Wii U, Windows, Xbox 360, and Xbox One, on 28 June 2016, with versions for OS X and Android and iOS releasing on 30 June 2016 and 28 July 2016, respectively.

=== Audio ===
Unlike its predecessors, which both used the mime acting, grunts and mumbles akin of Traveller’s Tales Lego games prior to Lego Batman 2: DC Super Heroes, Lego Star Wars: The Force Awakens features full voice acting and spoken dialogue. The game features the voice acting of Daisy Ridley, Oscar Isaac, John Boyega, Adam Driver, Carrie Fisher, Harrison Ford, Anthony Daniels, Domhnall Gleeson, Gwendoline Christie and Max von Sydow reprising their roles from the film, as well as Bill Kipsang Rotich as Nien Nunb, Christian Simpson as C'Ai Threnalli and Tom Kane reprising his role as Admiral Ackbar from various Star Wars video games. Archival recordings from the film also serve as the game's dialogue.

=== Downloadable content ===
A total of 12 downloadable content (DLC) packs were released from the game. The first one, titled "The Phantom Limb", which was initially a timed exclusive on Sony systems, adds a level that explains how C-3PO obtained the red arm he is depicted with in the film, in addition to eight characters and a miniature vehicle based on the level. There were three more level packs released for the game, namely "Escape from Starkiller Base", which follows a pair of Resistance pilots as they make their escape from the besieged Starkiller Base; "First Order Siege of Takodana", which depicts the Battle of Takodana from the First Order's perspective; and "Jakku: Poe's Quest for Survival", which depicts Poe Dameron's escape from Jakku after he is separated from Finn and presumed dead during the events of the film. The other eight packs were character packs, each adding eight characters and a miniature ship: the "Droid Character Pack", "The Clone Wars Character Pack", "Rebels Character Pack", "The Empire Strikes Back Character Pack", "Jabba's Palace Character Pack", "The Freemaker Adventures Character Pack", "Prequel Trilogy Character Pack", and "Jedi Character Pack".

== Reception ==
Reception

Aggregate score
| Aggregator | Score |
|---|---|
| Metacritic | (PC) 72/100 (PS4) 78/100 (WII U) 74/100 (XONE) 76/100 |

Review scores
| Publication | Score |
|---|---|
| Destructoid | 7/10 |
| Game Informer | 8.5/10 |
| GamesMaster | 79% |
| GameSpot | 7/10 |
| IGN | 9/10 |
| Nintendo Life | 7/10 |
| Official Xbox Magazine (US) | 7/10 |
| PC Gamer (US) | 64/100 |
| TouchArcade | 4/5 |

The game received mostly positive reviews. GameSpot awarded of 7.0 out of 10, saying "Lego Star Wars: The Force Awakens doesn't really take you to a new galaxy far, far away, but it's still a pleasant journey." Game Informer awarded it 8.5 out of 10, saying "A blast for Star Wars and Lego fans alike." IGN awarded it 9.0 out of 10, saying "Lego Star Wars: The Force Awakens is the most gaming fun I’ve had with either series in years."

The game was the best-selling retail video game in the UK in its week of release and the fourth biggest launch for a Star Wars game in the UK, and became the fourth fastest-selling game based on the Star Wars universe, and the fourth fastest-selling Lego game. It stayed in the top position for five consecutive weeks, and was the second Lego game to do so, following Lego Batman 2: DC Super Heroes.

=== Awards ===
List of awards and nominations
| Award | Category | Result | Ref. |
|---|---|---|---|
| British Academy Children's Awards | Game | Nominated | |
| Annie Awards | Best Animated Television/Broadcast Commercial | Nominated | |
| D.I.C.E. Awards | Family Game of the Year | Nominated | |
