= Lego Star Wars =

Lego theme based on Star Wars

- Sub‑themes: The Old Republic; The Phantom Menace; Attack of the Clones; Clone Wars; The Clone Wars; Revenge of the Sith; The Bad Batch; The Force Unleashed; Jedi: Fallen Order; Solo; Obi-Wan Kenobi; Andor; Rebels; Rogue One; A New Hope; The Empire Strikes Back; The Freemaker Adventures; Return of the Jedi; Battlefront (2015 game); Battlefront II (2017 game); The Mandalorian; The Book of Boba Fett; Ahsoka; Skeleton Crew; The Mandalorian & Grogu; Resistance; The Force Awakens; The Last Jedi; Galaxy's Edge; The Rise of Skywalker; Young Jedi Adventures
- Subject: Star Wars
- Licensed from: Lucasfilm Ltd. and its parent company Disney
- Availability: 1999–present
- Total sets: 1051 sets; 1590 Lego minifigures
- Official website

Lego Star Wars (stylized in all caps) is a Lego theme based on the Star Wars media franchise and fictional universe created by George Lucas. As of June 2026, it includes 1051 Lego building toy sets, 1590 Lego minifigures, an eponymous video game series containing six games, and multiple animated short films and television series.

Originally it was only licensed from 1998 to 2009, but the Lego Group extended the license with Lucasfilm, first until 2011, then until 2016, then again until 2022, and then once more until 2032.

== Overview ==
Lego Star Wars is based on the Star Wars saga and franchise. The product line directly focuses on the Star Wars characters from the films and TV Series, with the exception of a few special characters. It was first announced in February 1999 at the North American International Toy Fair, serving as a tie-in to Star Wars: Episode I – The Phantom Menace, that would be released in May.

== Development ==
The Lego Star Wars designers have revealed how they have "changed strategy" to get popular minifigures into cheaper and more accessible sets. Lego Star Wars Creative Lead Jens Kronvold Frederikcen explained, "We have changed our strategy a little bit over the years," and continued, "Where in the past, we often kept some of them – the most important especially – for the higher prices, we are now thinking young kids, maybe newcomers to Star Wars, want to get into it."

The designers revealed the Force Ghost minifigures as a result of changes to the company's transparent plastic. Creative Lead Jens Kronvold Frederikcen, "The reason for not doing it was that the minifigures are made out of many different types of plastic, because they need to have different abilities and characteristics," Design Director Michael Lee Stockwell explained, "Some have to be flexible, some need to use clutch power and whatnot," and continued, "So the hands are different material than the heads, for example."

Stockwell explained how coming up with playsets based on new shows and movies is trickier than creating vehicles. Referring to a Lego set based on The Mandalorian, Stockwell explained, "We were interested in [the Armourer's forge] already from the first season, but we didn't know enough about the context," and continued, "We didn't know enough of what was happening around this. That's one of the major differences between designing a ship and a playset like this, because it's sometimes easier to understand a ship."

Logo from 2014 to 2015

The designers explained the Death Star (set number: 75316) is a great example of how they decide which sets to produce. Frederiksen explained, "If it's something that's exposed in more places, then there's a high chance that it's popular," and continued, "We did the same thing when creating stuff from The Clone Wars. We always thought the best set was [vehicles] that were both from the prequel movies, but also in The Clone Wars, [because] then we make more people happy."

The designers explained the design process of a minifigures and how they feel responsible for their accuracy. Lego Star Wars designer Madison O'Neil explained, "Part of that is just trying to fit these details in. The leg print, the arm print, wherever we can that's a new thing that we're starting to be able to do a little bit more of which is great to have the capacity to do that. We work within these frames that we have within the company that everyone has, and we just try to do the absolute best we can."

== Construction sets ==
The package for the #8017 Darth Vader's TIE Fighter Lego set

The first few sets based on the original trilogy were released in 1999, coinciding with the release of The Phantom Menace. Sets based on the prequel trilogy of Star Wars would follow, starting with Episode I – The Phantom Menace. As each new film in the prequel trilogy neared its release date, Lego issued new models of ships and scenes in those films, as well as additional sets from the original trilogy. Lego has also produced models based on Clone Wars, The Clone Wars, The Old Republic, The Force Unleashed, Rebels, The Force Awakens, Battlefront, Rogue One, The Last Jedi, Solo, Resistance, The Mandalorian, The Rise of Skywalker, The Bad Batch, The Book of Boba Fett, Obi-Wan Kenobi, Star Wars: Andor, Ahsoka, and Star Wars Jedi: Fallen Order. Sets based on Star Wars: Young Jedi Adventures, Galaxy's Edge, The Freemaker Adventures, and Vader Immortal have also been produced.

According to the Lego-owned marketplace BrickLink, The Lego Group has, as of June 2026 released a total of 1051 Lego sets and promotional polybags and 1590 minifigures as part of its Lego Star Wars theme.

As of 2022, The Lego Group has confirmed the Lego Star Wars theme will continue until December 2032.

=== Minifigures ===
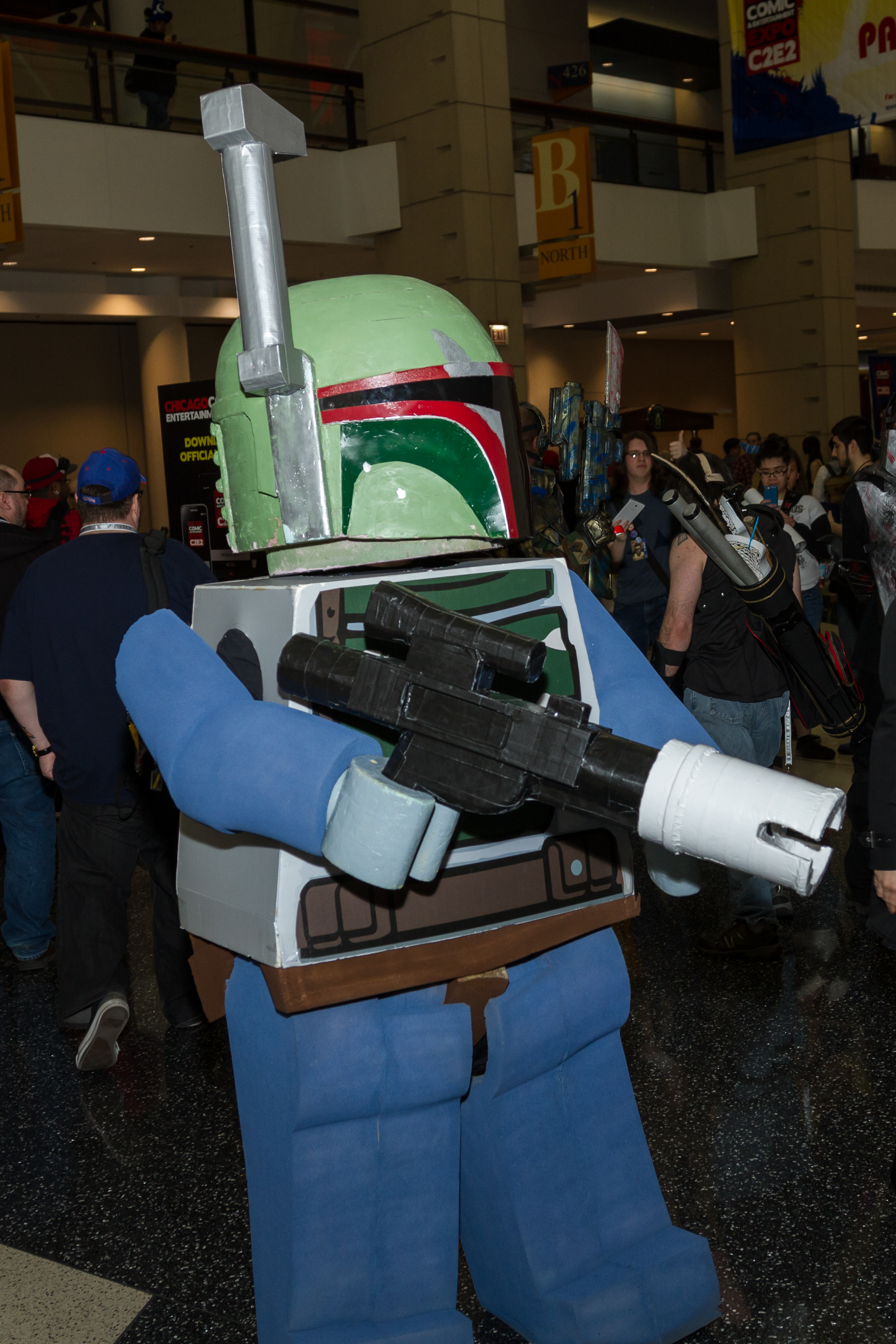
Cosplay of Lego Boba Fett

Some minifigures repeatedly appear across multiple Lego sets, while others can be very rare, vastly increasing their resale value. Luke Skywalker and Darth Vader are the themes most prominent minifigures while battle droids are, by quantity, one of the most often appearing minifigures in all of Lego. The first Lego Star Wars minifigures to ever be released were Luke Skywalker and Ben Kenobi from #7110 "Landspeeder". Tan colored OOM battle droids are the first Lego Star Wars minifigure by production code (sw0001a) and have only four different unique designs, all of which are only different oriented arms and an additional backplate. Lego switched the skin tone from yellow to a more natural skin tone between 2003 and 2004, and by 2005 the yellow skin tone was retired in the Lego Star Wars line. In 2019, the number of Lego Star Wars minifigures has surpassed 1000, with the Battlefront II protagonist Iden Versio bearing code sw1000.

=== Subthemes ===
==== Ultimate Collector Series (UCS) ====
In addition to the regular Minifigure-scale sets, Lego has released 37 sets in their Ultimate Collector Series line, also known as UCS. Starting in 2000 with models of the X-Wing and TIE Interceptor, these models are known for being considerably larger, more detailed, and meant more for display purposes than other sets. As a result, they tend to cost more than other Lego Star Wars sets. They often include an information plaque and display stand. For example, the 2017 UCS version of the Millennium Falcon contained 7541 pieces, including 10 Minifigures, and was the largest Lego Star Wars set ever released at the time, and the fifth largest set of any collection ever commercially released. On June 5, 2015, a sealed box of the older 2007 Millennium Falcon Lego set (10179) was auctioned at online auction house Catawiki for €5,000 ($5556.50 USD at the time), making it the most expensive Lego set to ever be sold on the secondhand market. The Death Star (75419), which released on October 1, 2025, contains 9019 pieces and surpassed the 2017 Millennium Falcon as the largest UCS set on release by piece count, and was the first Lego set ever to be sold for $1,000 USD at MSRP.

===== List of Ultimate Collectors Series sets =====
This list contains every Lego Star Wars set released under the Ultimate Collectors Series line, and contain some of the most notable sets in the Lego Star Wars line.

Set Name	Set Number	Release Year	# of Pieces	Origin
TIE Interceptor	7181	2000	703	Return of the Jedi
X-Wing	7191	2000	1300	A New Hope
Darth Maul	10018	2001	1868	The Phantom Menace
Rebel Blockade Runner	10019	2001	1746	A New Hope
Yoda	7194	2002	1075	The Empire Strikes Back
Naboo Starfighter	10026	2002	187	The Phantom Menace
Imperial Star Destroyer	10030	2002	3106	A New Hope
Rebel Snowspeeder	10129	2003	1455	The Empire Strikes Back
Y-Wing Attack Starfighter	10134	2004	1489	A New Hope
Death Star II	10143	2005	3447	Return of the Jedi
Imperial AT-ST	10174	2006	1068	The Empire Strikes Back
Vader's TIE Advance	10175	2006	1212	A New Hope
Millennium Falcon	10179	2007	5197	A New Hope
General Grievous	10186	2008	1085	Revenge of the Sith
Death Star	10188	2008	3803	A New Hope
Imperial Shuttle	10212	2010	2503	Return of the Jedi
Obi-Wan's Jedi Starfighter	10215	2010	676	Attack of the Clones
Super Star Destroyer	10221	2011	3152	The Empire Strikes Back
R2-D2	10225	2012	2127	A New Hope
B-Wing Starfighter	10227	2012	1487	Return of the Jedi
Ewok Village	10236	2013	1990	Return of the Jedi
Red Five X-wing Starfighter	10240	2013	1559	A New Hope
Sandcrawler	75059	2014	3296	A New Hope
Slave 1	75060	2015	1996	The Empire Strikes Back
TIE Fighter	75095	2015	1685	A New Hope
Assault on Hoth	75098	2016	2144	The Empire Strikes Back
Death Star	75159	2016	4016	A New Hope
Snowspeeder	75144	2017	1703	The Empire Strikes Back
Millennium Falcon	75192	2017	7541	A New Hope
Y-Wing Starfighter	75181	2018	1967	A New Hope
Imperial Star Destroyer	75252	2019	4784	A New Hope
A-Wing Starfighter	75275	2020	1673	Return of the Jedi
Republic Gunship	75309	2021	3292	Attack of the Clones
AT-AT	75313	2021	6785	The Empire Strikes Back
Razor Crest	75331	2022	6187	The Mandalorian
Luke Skywalker's Landspeeder	75341	2022	1890	A New Hope
X-Wing Starfighter	75355	2023	1953	A New Hope
Venator-Class Republic Attack Cruiser	75367	2023	5374	Revenge of the Sith
TIE Interceptor	75382	2024	1931	Return of the Jedi
Jabba's Sail Barge	75397	2024	3943	Return of the Jedi
Jango Fett's Firespray-Class Starship	75409	2025	2970	Attack of the Clones
AT-ST Walker	75417	2025	1513	The Empire Strikes Back
Death Star	75419	2025	9023	A New Hope
The Mandalorian's N-1 Starfighter	75442	2026	1809	The Mandalorian

==== Master Builder Series ====
With similar complexity to the Ultimate Collector Series sets, sets in the Master Builder Series are designed with more interactivity in mind, featuring numerous play features, functions, and interiors for Minifigures compared to UCS sets, which mainly prioritize display and often forego interiors. The first set of the line was 2018's Betrayal at Cloud City (75222). This was followed by the Mos Eisley Cantina (75290), released in 2020. As of the Mos Eisley Cantina's retirement in 2025, there are no Master Builder Series sets currently being sold.

==== The Helmet Collection ====
Starting in 2020, Lego began releasing display-focused sets based on helmets from the Star Wars universe, starting with Boba Fett's helmet (75277), a Stormtrooper helmet (75276), and a TIE Fighter Pilot helmet (75274). Similar to UCS sets, Helmet Collection sets showcase the helmet on a black brick-built stand with a related plaque.

==== Diorama Collection ====
In 2022, Lego introduced its Diorama Collection, which intends to replicate exact scenes from the series in small, detailed display sets, beginning with three sets based on scenes from A New Hope and The Empire Strikes Back.

==== Smart Brick ====
At the 2026 Consumer Electronics Show, Lego officially announced and demonstrated Smart Brick, a special Lego piece with rechargeable, electronic internals that could react with certain sets using motion, color, and NFC sensing technology, as well as a corresponding line of Lego sets that utilized it. The first wave of sets, which were exclusively of the Star Wars theme, was released on March 1 of that year to mixed critical reception due to high pricing, poor audio quality, and only some sets including the Smart Brick itself.

==== Appearances in Other Themes ====
On August 1, 2020, Lego released Star Wars The Sith (31200) under the Lego Art theme. This consists of 3,406 pieces and offers builders the option to recreate any one of the three Star Wars villains (Darth Maul, Kylo Ren, and Darth Vader) in a mosaic-like format using Lego 1x1 studs.

Lego has since released 22 Star Wars themed sets under the Lego BrickHeadz theme. They include characters from the sequel trilogy, the original trilogy, the Clone Wars, and The Mandalorian.

The sets First Order Stormtrooper (40391) and BB-8 (40431) were released as a part of Lego Brick Sketches theme.

== Video games ==
Lego Star Wars video games
Title	Year	Platform	Notes	Metacritic
Lego Star Wars: The Video Game	2005	Microsoft Windows, OS X, PlayStation 2, Xbox, Game Boy Advance, GameCube	Based on the Star Wars prequel trilogy.	79 (GC)
Lego Star Wars II: The Original Trilogy	2006	Microsoft Windows, OS X, PlayStation 2, PlayStation Portable, Xbox, Xbox 360, Game Boy Advance, GameCube, Nintendo DS, J2ME	Based on the Star Wars original trilogy.	86 (PC)
Lego Star Wars: The Complete Saga	2007	Microsoft Windows, OS X, PlayStation 3, Xbox 360, Nintendo DS, Wii, iOS, Android	Combined Lego Star Wars: The Video Game and Lego Star Wars II: The Original Trilogy into a single game with various enhancements and additional features.	80 (PS3)
Lego Star Wars III: The Clone Wars	2011	Microsoft Windows, OS X, PlayStation 3, PlayStation Portable, Xbox 360, Nintendo DS, Nintendo 3DS, Wii	Based on the Star Wars: The Clone Wars film and the first two seasons of the animated series.	76 (PS3)
Lego Star Wars: The Force Awakens	2016	Microsoft Windows, OS X, PlayStation 3, PlayStation 4, PlayStation Vita, Xbox 360, Xbox One, Nintendo 3DS, Wii U, iOS, Android	Based on the Star Wars: The Force Awakens film.	78 (PS4)
Lego Star Wars Battles	2019	OS X, iOS	Deck-building game based on an original story where the Light Side is against the Dark Side.	71
Lego Star Wars: Castaways	2021	OS X, iOS	Based on an original story where the player is cast off onto an unknown island.	80
Lego Star Wars: The Skywalker Saga	2022	Microsoft Windows, PlayStation 4, PlayStation 5, Xbox One, Xbox Series X/S, Nintendo Switch	Based on all 9 films of the main Star Wars saga. Also has multiple DLCs.	82 (PS5)

Traveller's Tales president Jon Burton stated in a July 2008 interview with Variety that the series had collectively sold 15 million copies. As of February 13, 2009, Lego Star Wars: The Video Game has sold over 6.8 million copies worldwide, Lego Star Wars II has sold over 8.3 million, The Complete Saga has sold over 4.1 million, and the three combined have sold over 21 million. In May 2009, Wired reported combined sales of 20 million. As of 2012, all Lego Star Wars video games had collectively sold more than 30 million copies. As of 2016, more than 36 million games were sold. As of 2019, the series has sold more than 50 million copies of Lego Star Wars video games. In April 2022, Lego Star Wars: The Skywalker Saga was listed as one of the UK boxed chart top 10 by Eurogamer. Lego Star Wars: The Skywalker Saga has sold more than three million copies.

== Lego Star Wars in other media ==
=== List of Lego Star Wars films and videos ===
Several films and videos based on Lego Star Wars have been produced; additionally, Lego Star Wars characters cameo in The Lego Movie (2014).

==== Short films ====
- Lego Star Wars: Revenge of the Brick is the first computer-animated Lego Star Wars short film. It premiered on Cartoon Network in mid-2005, in conjunction with the theatrical release of Revenge of the Sith.
- Lego Star Wars: The Quest for R2-D2 is a short movie which aired on Cartoon Network in August 2009, and was uploaded to the Lego Star Wars website, in order to celebrate 10 years of Lego Star Wars,
- Lego Star Wars: Bombad Bounty, is another CGI Lego short film, it was released in 2010. In it, Darth Vader hires Boba Fett to track down Jar Jar Binks for an accident he caused to Vader. The film also takes place at the same time as the original trilogy, showing that Jar Jar was responsible for the destruction of the first Death Star, and was with Boba Fett on Jabba's Barge during the events of Return of the Jedi.
- 36 web shorts have been released on YouTube for the theme, several of which previously released elsewhere:

#	Title	Release date
1	Bombad Bounty	August 10, 2012
2	May the 4th Be With You	July 27, 2012
3	The Hunt for R2-D2	October 1, 2012
4	"Tactical Core – Coruscant" – Lego Star Wars	April 8, 2014
5	Lego Star Wars "Tactical Core – Mygeeto"	May 22, 2014
6	Lego Star Wars – Tactical Core "Star Destroyer	June 10, 2014
7	Lego Star Wars – Tactical Core "Star Destroyer 2"	October 3, 2014
8	Lego Star Wars – Tactical Core "Snowspeeder"	September 19, 2014
9	Introducing Buildable Figures!	September 5, 2015
10	Mandalorian Speeder Part 1	December 6, 2013
11	Mandalorian Speeder Part 2	February 19, 2014
12	The Final Duel – Lego Star Wars – Episode 8	July 19, 2015
13	Rebels Ghost Story	December 3, 2014
14	Star Wars: Rogue One As Told By Lego	May 11, 2017
15	Star Wars: The Last Jedi Two-Minute Recap	March 20, 2018
16	Snowflake Snack	November 15, 2020
17	Celebrate the Season: Trick-or-Treat	September 16, 2021
18	Celebrate the Season: The Pumpkin Batch	September 16, 2021
19	Celebrate the Season: Carving Up the Competition	September 16, 2021
20	Celebrate the Season: Scary Starship	September 16, 2021
21	Celebrate the Season: Ghost Ship	September 16, 2021
22	New Year's Hothin' Eve	December 29, 2021
23	Boba Fett's Throne Room Party	February 17, 2022
24	Lego Star Wars Celebration Short Film	May 28, 2022
25	A Gift from Grogu	June 12, 2022
26	The Heat Of The Battle	July 25, 2022
27	Lego Star Wars Rebels	July 25, 2022
28	Hot Day Hijinks	July 25, 2022
29	Sandcastles with Grogu	July 25, 2022
30	Cruising with Luke	July 25, 2022
31	Bad Batch Vacation	July 25, 2022
32	Droid Holiday Hustle	November 17, 2022
33	Gifting with Grogu	November 17, 2022
34	Obi-Wan's present for Vader	November 17, 2022
35	Celebrating The Force	May 4, 2023
36	I am your father	June 16, 2023
37	Pick Han's Co-Pilot	September 15, 2023

==== Television specials ====
- Lego Star Wars: The Padawan Menace released on July 7, 2011, is a 30-minute, exclusive TV special written by Michael Price is about a Jedi Academy field trip. When Yoda leads a group of rambunctious Jedi younglings through Senate chambers when he senses a disturbance in the Force. Summoned to help save the Republic, he discovers that a young boy named Ian is pretending to be a Jedi youngling secretly boarded his ship... and has a taste for adventure. Meanwhile, C-3PO and R2-D2 are put in charge of the boisterous group and find themselves in over their heads. Yoda and the droids proceed to save the younglings from the Separatists as well as Jabba. The special premiered in the United States on Cartoon Network on July 22, 2011, at 7 p.m. and in the United Kingdom on October 17 at 5:30. The DVD and Blu-ray include several special features such as The Quest for R2-D2 and Bombad Bounty as well as other short films.
- Lego Star Wars: The Empire Strikes Out released on September 26, 2012, airing on Cartoon Network in the United States, and would be one of the last Star Wars productions to be made before Lucasfilm was sold to The Walt Disney Company a month later. In this special, taken place before the events of The Empire Strikes Back, Luke embarks on a mission to find and destroy an Imperial base on Naboo, but is relentlessly chased by a group of fanatic fangirls, who think of him as a celebrity for destroying the Death Star. Meanwhile, Vader engages a "sithling" rivalry with Darth Maul, in order to prove he's the best Sith Lord to Palpatine, who is constructing a second Death Star. The special was dedicated to Ralph McQuarrie, who worked on the original Star Wars trilogy who died before it was released.
- The Lego Star Wars Holiday Special was released on November 17, 2020, on Disney+, a spiritual successor to and satirisation of the Star Wars Holiday Special (1978). In the special, set after Episode IX, Rey begins to doubt her abilities as a teacher to Finn. She travels to a temple and finds a time key, which allows her to travel to different moments in time throughout the Star Wars saga to observe past Jedi Masters and their students. However, she loses the key to Emperor Palpatine and Darth Vader, who use it to go to the future, meeting Kylo Ren. After learning from him about his demise at Vader's hands, Palpatine seeks to make Kylo his new apprentice and ensure he will rule the galaxy forever. Meanwhile, Finn, Rose and Poe try to organize the perfect Life Day party, but chaos ensues at every step.
- Lego Star Wars: Terrifying Tales was released on October 1, 2021, exclusively on Disney+. In the special, set after Episode IX, Poe and BB-8 make an emergency landing on the volcanic planet Mustafar, where they meet Graballa the Hutt (Jabba the hutt's cousin). The crime boss has purchased Darth Vader's castle and is renovating it into the galaxy's first all-inclusive Sith-inspired luxury hotel. While waiting for his X-Wing to be fixed, Poe, BB-8, Graballa, and Dean (a plucky and courageous young boy who works as Graballa's mechanic) venture deep into the mysterious castle with Vader's servant, Vaneé. Along the way, Vaneé shares three creepy stories linked to ancient artifacts and iconic villains from across all eras of Star Wars. As Vaneé spins his tales and lures our heroes deeper into the shadowy underbelly of the castle, a villainous plan emerges. With the help of Dean, Poe and BB-8 will have to face their fears, stop an ancient evil from rising, and escape to make it back to their friends.
- Lego Star Wars: Summer Vacation was released on August 5, 2022, exclusively on Disney+. The story is set after Episode IX where Finn plans a summer cruise for the rest of his friends before they take their separate ways, eventually Finn is visited by the spirits of Obi-Wan, Anakin, and Leia to tell him stories to teach him to cherish the memories he shared with his friends.
- Lego Star Wars: The Mandalorian was released on September 2, 2026, exclusively on Disney+. In the special, set after The Mandalorian and Grogu, Din Djarin / The Mandalorian and Grogu were at a surprise party. All their friends started to retell their stories from the events from the three seasons of The Mandalorian and The Book of Boba Fett.

=== List of Lego Star Wars television series ===
- Lego Star Wars: The Yoda Chronicles consists of two seasons of half-hour episodes, released in 2013 and 2014 respectively. The first season is a three-episode Clone Wars-era story about a specialized clone trooper whom both the Sidious' Sith and Yoda's Jedi want on their side; he also appears in the four-episode second season, The New Yoda Chronicles, which focuses on Luke and a showdown between him and Darth Vader before The Empire Strikes Back. The final episode also has an alternate-ending version on Disney+.
- Lego Star Wars: Droid Tales aired on Disney XD between July and November 2015, as a 5-part animated mini-series. The series serves as a comedic re-telling of the first six Star Wars films from C-3PO's point of view.
- Lego Star Wars: The Resistance Rises aired on Disney XD between February and May 2016, as a 5-part animated mini-series. The series serves as a comedic prequel to Star Wars: The Force Awakens.
- Lego Star Wars: The Freemaker Adventures aired on Disney XD for two seasons between June 2016 and August 2017. Set between Episode V and Episode VI, it tells the story of the Freemakers, a family of scavengers that find themselves pulled into the conflict between the Rebels and the Empire.
- Lego Star Wars: All-Stars premiered on Disney XD on October 29, 2018. It consists of five half-hour episodes, the first of which is a compilation of eight separately-released short films. Set during multiple Star Wars eras, it tells the story of other relatives of the Freemaker family, including their parents Pace and Lena during the time of Solo, and Zander's daughter Moxie during Episode VII and Episode VIII.
- Lego Star Wars: Rebuild the Galaxy is a four-episode miniseries that premiered on Disney+ on September 13, 2024. The series follows Sig Greebling, who accidentally activates a powerful Jedi relic that rewrites reality, forcing him to restore things to normal.
- Lego Star Wars: Rebuild the Galaxy - Pieces of the Past is a four-episode miniseries that premiered on Disney+ on September 19, 2025. It is a sequel to Lego Star Wars: Rebuild the Galaxy and follows Sig Greebling and Darth Dev as they team up to face a new threat.

=== List of Lego Star Wars literature ===
Multiple Lego Star Wars reference books, short stories and coloring books have been released. Additionally, multiple Lego Star Wars magazines release monthly.

=== Other merchandise ===
The Lego Star Wars brand has also produced plush toys, alarm clocks in the design of minifigures and minifigures with keychain rings and magnets. They also released minifigures integrated into pens as part of Lego Writing.

== Reception ==
In 2015, The Lego Group has seen its first half results jump 18 percent for 2015, fuelled by the popularity of Lego Star Wars, Lego Jurassic World and Lego Technic.

In 2018, the Toy Retailers Association listed BB-8 (set number: 75187) and Millennium Falcon (set number: 75192) on its official list of 2018 Toy of the Year Awards.

In 2020, Lego Star Wars theme became the Top-selling themes for the year.

In 2021, the Toy Retailers Association listed The Razor Crest (set number: 75292) on its official list of 2021 Toy of The Year Awards.

In June 2021, R2-D2 (set number: 75308) was listed as the "Top 20 Lego Sets List" by Lego fansite Brick Fanatics.

In 2020, The Lego Group reported that the Lego Technic, Lego Star Wars, Lego Classic, Lego Disney Princess, Lego Harry Potter and Lego Speed Champions, "The strong results are due to our incredible team," and that these themes had helped to push revenue for the first half of 2020 grow 7% to DKK 15.7 billion compared with the same period in 2019.

In 2021, Darth Vader Helmet (set number: 75304) was listed as one of the "Top 10 toys for Christmas 2021" by Tesco.

In March 2022, The Lego Group reported that the Lego City, Lego Technic, Lego Creator Expert, Lego Harry Potter and Lego Star Wars themes had earned for the full year of 2021. Revenue for the year grew 27 percent versus 2020 to DKK 55.3 billion and consumer sales grew 22 percent over the same period, outpacing the toy industry and driving market share growth globally and in largest markets.

On 28 September 2022, The Lego Group reported that the Lego Star Wars, Lego Technic, Lego Icons (formerly Creator Expert), Lego City, Lego Harry Potter and Lego Friends themes had earned for the six months ending 30 June 2022. Revenue for the period grew 17 percent to DKK 27.0 billion compared with the same period in 2021, driven by strong demand. Consumer sales grew 13 percent, significantly ahead of the toy industry, contributing to global market share growth.

In February 2023, Millennium Falcon (set number: 75192) and The Razor Crest (set number: 75331) were listed on "The biggest Lego sets of all time" by Lego fansite Brick Fanatics.

In March 2023, The Lego Group reported that the Lego City, Lego Technic, Lego Icons, Lego Harry Potter and Lego Star Wars themes had earned for the full year of 2022. Revenue for the year grew 17 percent to DKK 64.6 billion and consumer sales grew 12 percent in 2022, achieving growth in all major market groups with especially strong performance in the Americas and Western Europe.

In August 2023, The Lego Group reported that the Lego Icons, Lego Star Wars, Lego Technic and Lego City themes had earned for the first six months of 2023. Revenue was DKK 27.4 billion, a growth of 1% compared with H1 2022. Consumer sales grew 3% outperforming a declining toy market and contributing to strong market share growth.

== Awards and nominations ==
In 2006, Lego Star Wars was awarded "Toy of the Year" and also "Activity Toy of the Year" by the Toy Association.

In 2009, Darth Vader's TIE Fighter (set number: 8017) and Echo Base (set number: 7749) were awarded "DreamToys" in the Construction category by the Toy Retailers Association.

In 2010, Hoth Wampa Cave (set number: 8089) was awarded "DreamToys" in the Boys category by the Toy Retailers Association.

In 2011, Millennium Falcon (set number: 7965) was awarded "DreamToys" in the Construction category by the Toy Retailers Association.

In 2012, Desert Skiff (set number: 9496) was awarded "DreamToys" in the Construction category by the Toy Retailers Association.

In 2015, Kylo Ren's Command Shuttle (set number: 75104) was awarded "DreamToys" in the Build It And They Will Thrive category by the Toy Retailers Association.

In 2016, U-Wing Fighter (set number: 75155) was awarded "DreamToys" in the Action Station category by the Toy Retailers Association.

In 2017, BB-8 (set number: 75187) and First Order Heavy Assault Walker (set number: 75189) were awarded "DreamToys" in the Licensed To Thrill category by the Toy Retailers Association.

In 2018, BB-8 (set number: 75187) was awarded "Toy of the Year" and also "Construction Toy of the Year" by the Toy Association. Also Millennium Falcon (set number: 75192) was awarded "Toy of the Year" and also "Specialty Toy of the Year" by the Toy Association.

In 2019, Yoda (set number: 75255) was awarded "DreamToys" in the Movie Magic category by the Toy Retailers Association.

In 2020, 501st Legion Clone Troopers (set number: 75280) was awarded "DreamToys" in the Licensed To Thrill category by the Toy Retailers Association.

In 2020, Droid Commander (set number: 75253) was awarded "Toy of the Year" and also "STEM/STEAM Toy of the Year" by the Toy Association.

In 2021, Boba Fett's Starship (set number: 75312) (set number: 75280) was awarded "DreamToys" in the Licensed To Thrill category by the Toy Retailers Association.

In 2022, Hoth AT-ST (set number: 75322) was awarded "DreamToys" in the Film & TV Favourites and The Top 12 Toys for Christmas 2022 categories by the Toy Retailers Association. Dark Trooper Attack (set number: 75324) was awarded "DreamToys" in the Film & TV Favourites category by the Toy Retailers Association.

== See also ==
- Lego Indiana Jones – Lego theme
- The Lego Movie – 2014 film by Phil Lord and Christopher Miller
- Lego Games – Lego theme
- Bricks & Minifigs–Reckless Ben controversy – 2026 internet and business dispute
