= Lego Star Wars III: The Clone Wars =

2011 video game

- Developers: Traveller's Tales; TT Fusion (handheld)
- Publishers: LucasArts; Feral Interactive (OS X)
- Director: Jon Burton
- Designer: Jon Burton
- Programmers: Stephen Harding; Chris Stanforth
- Artists: James Cunliffe; Leon Warren
- Composers: John Williams (Original Star Wars themes); Kevin Kiner (Original Clone Wars music); Chance Thomas (add. music)
- Series: Lego Star Wars
- Platforms: Microsoft Windows; Nintendo 3DS; Nintendo DS; PlayStation 3; PlayStation Portable; Wii; Xbox 360; OS X
- Release: NA: 22 March 2011; EU: 25 March 2011; NA: 27 March 2011 (3DS); AU: 30 March 2011; AU: 31 March 2011 (3DS); OS X: WW: 27 October 2011
- Genre: Action-adventure
- Modes: Single-player, multiplayer

Lego Star Wars III: The Clone Wars is a Lego-themed action-adventure video game developed by Traveller's Tales and published by LucasArts in March 2011 for the PlayStation 3, PlayStation Portable, Xbox 360, Wii, Nintendo DS, Microsoft Windows, and the Nintendo 3DS. It was one of the 3DS's launch titles. The game features missions and characters from the 2008 animated film Star Wars: The Clone Wars and its follow-up television series, as well as fan-favorites from the original Star Wars saga, in both single-player and multiplayer modes. The Mac OS X version of the game was released by Feral Interactive.

== Gameplay ==
Gameplay in Lego Star Wars III: The Clone Wars is similar to the previous titles in the series, and other Lego video games. Up to two players can switch between different characters to fight enemies in combat, solve puzzles, and progress through various levels. It introduced a few novelties, including scene swap, where players can switch between teams in separate locations to complete multi-part objectives, and boss battles. The game also features some real-time strategy elements, where players command large ground armies across battlefields. Also, the space fights have been remodeled to use a more instinctive, 3D-space battle sensation.

It is set during the events of the Clone Wars movie and animated series, unlike the first two games (and The Complete Saga), which were adapted from Episodes I-VI. The console version of the game features 115 characters. The handheld versions for the PSP, 3DS, and DS are simplified versions with less content, but they include characters and minigames not present in the main version.

=== New features ===
The game engine used by previous Lego Star Wars games was upgraded, with improved graphics, lighting and the ability to hold more than 200 moving units or objects on-screen.

New features include scenarios in which players can command large armies of clones to battle against droid armies (although not on the handheld versions), including a split screen Versus mode where two players can engage in battles against each other, and Story Swap mode, in which players can switch between two characters in different areas whose stories run simultaneously. All new character features include lightsaber throwing, picking up droids and stepping on certain pads in which Jedi do "combo moves" to destroy certain objects. Vehicle levels have been altered; now, players can land their ship and begin fighting on foot (similar to Star Wars: Battlefront II). All the original elements seen in previous Lego Star Wars games have returned. The hub has also been changed, taking place in a Republic Cruiser named the Resolute and also in a Separatist Ship called the Invisible Hand. Characters can be purchased on these ships- Separatists on the Invisible Hand; characters from the Republic on the Resolute.

== Plot ==
The game adapts the animated film Star Wars: The Clone Wars and various episodes from the first two seasons of the television series of the same name, without dialogue and with many humorous deviations. The prologue level is based on the Geonosian Arena battle from Attack of the Clones.

== Development and marketing ==
The game had been in development since late 2009 when the second season of Star Wars: The Clone Wars started. The game was covered up and in June 2010 after the second-season finale The Lego Group started to work on adding the last part of the second season in and new things such as a new hub and a new way to use the lightsaber. Then in late 2010, LEGO finished the game and started to make promotions for it. On 23 June 2010, LEGO released the first trailer for the game and later in 2011 they released some demos and cutscenes. Nintendo released trailers for Nintendo 3DS for the game alongside E3 convention videos featuring gameplay footage. The game was released in 2011 in North America on 22 March, in Europe on 25 March, and in Australia on 30 March following delay of one month. The 3DS version of the game was released on 31 March in Australia as a launch title for the system. A version for OS X was released on 27 October of the same year.

== Reception ==
Reception

Aggregate score
Aggregator	Score						
Aggregator	3DS	DS	PC	PS3	PSP	Wii	Xbox 360
Metacritic	67/100	66/100	76/100	76/100	63/100	76/100	75/100

Review scores
Publication	Score						
Publication	3DS	DS	PC	PS3	PSP	Wii	Xbox 360
GameSpot	6/10		6.5/10	6.5/10		6.5/10	6.5/10
GameTrailers	6.5/10	6.5/10	6.5/10	6.5/10	6.5/10	6.5/10	6.5/10
IGN	6/10	6/10	7.5/10	7.5/10	6/10	7/10	7.5/10

The game has received positive reviews. GameSpot gave 6.5/10 for PC, PlayStation 3, Xbox 360 and Wii while 6/10 for Nintendo 3DS. IGN's Anthony Gallegos rated the PC, PlayStation 3, and Xbox 360 versions of the game 7.5/10, the Wii version 7/10, and the DS, 3DS, and PSP versions 6/10. He commented on the vast variety of content in the in-game hub; "the hub world is open to players to explore, but this time around, Traveller's Tales have really outdone themselves". They further stated, "like so much of the Lego games design, when you combine these two relatively unexciting portions together, something strange happens: It becomes a simple, engaging game". GameTrailers gave the game 6.5/10, and called it "one of the dullest in the entire series".

As of December 2020, the game has sold over 7.3 million copies worldwide.
