= Lego Star Wars: The Complete Saga =

2007 video game

- Cover art
- Developers: Traveller's Tales; TT Fusion (handheld/mobile)
- Publishers: LucasArts; Feral Interactive (Mac OS X); Warner Bros. Interactive Entertainment (mobile & Steam); Disney Interactive Studios (Xbox & GOG)
- Director: Jon Burton
- Programmer: John Hodskinson
- Artist: James Cunliffe
- Composers: Adam Hay; David Whittaker
- Series: Lego Star Wars
- Platforms: Microsoft Windows; Nintendo DS; PlayStation 3; Wii; Xbox 360; Mac OS X; iOS; Android
- Release: 6 November 2007: Nintendo DS, PlayStation 3, Wii, Xbox 360; NA: 6 November 2007; AU: 7 November 2007; EU: 9 November 2007 (X360, PS3); EU: 16 November 2007 (Wii, DS); Windows; WW: 13 October 2009; Mac OS X; WW: 16 November 2010; iOS; WW: 11 December 2013; Android; WW: 1 January 2015
- Genre: Action-adventure
- Modes: Single-player, multiplayer

Lego Star Wars: The Complete Saga is a 2007 Lego-themed action-adventure video game based on the Lego Star Wars line of construction toys. The game was developed by Traveller's Tales and announced by LucasArts on 25 May 2007 at Celebration IV. It was released on 6 November 2007 in North America. The Complete Saga is a combination of its predecessors in the Lego Star Wars series, Lego Star Wars: The Video Game (2005) and its sequel, Lego Star Wars II: The Original Trilogy (2006). The Complete Saga follows the events of the first six episodes of the Skywalker Saga.

For its first release in 2007, The Complete Saga was developed for the Xbox 360, PlayStation 3, Wii, and Nintendo DS. The game has since been developed on multiple occasions so that it may be played on a variety of different devices: the Microsoft Windows adaption released on 13 October 2009, the macOS adaptation released on 12 November 2010, the iOS adaptation released on 11 December 2013, and the Android adaptation was released on 1 January 2015. The game is also available on newer generations of PlayStation and Xbox through backward compatibility. The availability of languages varies depending on the platform. The game was a critical and commercial success.

== Gameplay ==
The Complete Saga's gameplay gives the player a third-person perspective of the 3D game world that includes characters, environments, and objects that have been modeled after the Lego Star Wars line of construction toys. The gameplay itself is a fusion of action-adventure, platform and puzzles to solve - combining the features of both Lego Star Wars: The Video Game and Lego Star Wars II: The Original Trilogy and giving them a refresh. The Complete Saga spans the events that take place from the Trade Federation negotiations above Naboo in Star Wars Episode I - The Phantom Menace (1999) to the Rebel attack on the second Death Star above Endor in Return of the Jedi (1983). The game provides comedic retellings of the films' events through dialogue-free cutscenes. The player takes over the role of one of the films' characters in each level, gaining special abilities with each one. The co-op mode of the game allows a second player to join in at any time. In the PlayStation 3 and Xbox 360 versions of the game, online co-op is available through PlayStation Network and Xbox Live. While playing each level, the player can obtain Lego studs, which act as the game's currency. Each player has their own health meter, visually symbolized by four hearts, that are shown on the heads-up display in the upper corners of the gameplay screen. Once the player has lost all four of their hearts, the player dies, exploding into Lego pieces and losing a few studs; but the player will quickly respawn and be given the chance to collect the studs they have lost.

Like in Lego Star Wars II: The Original Trilogy, the hub world takes place in the Mos Eisley Cantina where players are free to roam; players walk amongst popular characters from the films through the shop, the junkyard outside, or the two-player arcade. The Cantina has doors that allow the player to access the game's story mode, which includes the levels for the six episodes of the Skywalker Saga included in the game. Each episode has six chapters, and after completing the introductory chapter for Star Wars Episode I - The Phantom Menace, players can access the introductory chapters of each episode. After completing each episode chapter, players are automatically given the ability to play through the chapter again in Free Play with whatever characters they want.

Most of the story levels are the same as those found in their respective original games. The Complete Saga also includes two previously scrapped levels: "Anakin's Flight" and "Bounty Hunter Pursuit," which were intended to appear in Lego Star Wars: The Video Game but were cut during development. "Anakin's Flight" is based on the Naboo space battle against the droid control ship seen in The Phantom Menace. It was originally envisioned as a rail shooter level, but was changed to the free-roam style used in almost all vehicles levels in the game. "Bounty Hunter Pursuit" focuses on Obi-Wan Kenobi and Anakin Skywalker pursuing bounty hunter Zam Wesell across Coruscant from Attack of the Clones. It was also made into a free-roam level, but unlike "Anakin's Flight" was incorporated into Episode II, which only had five levels in the original game as opposed to six from the other episodes. The "Mos Espa Podrace" and "Gunship Cavalry" story levels were redesigned, although the versions from their respective original games are present as bonus levels. "Battle Over Coruscant," though, remains the same, with the change that players can change vehicles in Free Play.

Overall, there are 36 main story levels. The game also features 20 Bounty Hunter missions, six bonus levels, and Arcade games. The six bonus levels include two Lego City levels ("Lego City" and "New Town", with the former originally appearing in Lego Star Wars II: The Original Trilogy), two story levels ("Anakin's Flight" and "A New Hope", the latter of which was a special unlockable level found in Lego Star Wars: The Video Game), and the original versions of the "Mos Espa Podrace" and "Gunship Cavalry" levels.

While successfully progressing through each episode, players are also collecting Gold Bricks. In all versions of the game except for the Nintendo DS version, there are 160 gold bricks to collect; 120 of these are for the main levels. There are three for each of the levels. One is for completing the level in story mode, the second is for achieving "True Jedi" status by collecting a certain amount of studs/coins, and the third is by collecting 10 LEGO "minikit" canisters, which are hidden across the level. The additional gold bricks can be collected after completing the other bonus levels. Players can collect 20 gold bricks for completing the Bounty Hunter missions, which involve capturing key figures of the Old Republic and Rebellion for Jabba the Hutt. There are 6 further gold bricks for completing the bonus missions (10 in the iOS version) and another 14 available to purchase at the Cantina (8 in the iOS version). For iOS, there are 200 Gold Bricks overall with an additional gold brick available for each level with the completion of a challenge mode where the player must find the 10 hidden blue Minikits in 20 minutes. The iOS version also offers 12 gold bricks by completing the arcade games in the lobby.

New additions to The Complete Saga include a 2-player Battle Arena mode called "Arcade Mode", new Minikit vehicle bonus missions, the red power bricks from Lego Star Wars II: The Original Trilogy returning and being incorporated into the prequel trilogy levels, and 10 additional bounty hunter missions add new challenges to the Prequel trilogy portions originally seen in Lego Star Wars: The Video Game.

The Episodes I, II, and III levels have been updated so that characters can build and ride vehicles, wear helmets and gain access to bounty hunter and Stormtrooper areas. Prequel trilogy characters now have the ability to dodge blaster fire and have their own special melee attack (for example, Chewbacca rips off arms). New Force moves were added, Force Lightning and Force Choke. New characters have also been added, bringing the total up to 128. Indiana Jones is an unlockable playable character to foreshadow and promote Lego Indiana Jones: The Original Adventures.

=== Playable characters ===
There are over 120 playable characters from the films in The Complete Saga, including Anakin Skywalker, Obi-Wan Kenobi, Darth Sidious, Yoda, Luke Skywalker, Princess Leia, Han Solo, Chewbacca, and even characters new to the game like Watto, Zam Wessell, and Boss Nass. Certain characters carry blasters that can be transformed into grappling hooks, while the Jedi and Sith characters wield lightsabers and come with the ability to use the Force. There are also challenges in each level that can only be achieved by the abilities of certain characters; for example, only bounty hunters can open certain doors and only Sith lords can use the force to lift black Lego bricks. The Cantina features a character customizer, a key feature from Lego Star Wars II, that allows the player to mix and match different body parts from the previous Lego Star Wars games to create their own playable character.

== Development ==
Traveller's Tales created The Complete Saga in response to the success of the original game and its sequel with LucasArts publishing the game. They combined the two games while also updating graphics, as well as adding new levels, characters, and new costume elements for customizable characters.

While The Complete Saga targeted major seventh-generation platforms, Traveller's Tales ruled out the possibility of a PlayStation Portable version on the grounds that the developers did not have enough resources to make it.

== Reception ==
Reception

Aggregate score
Aggregator	Score					
Aggregator	DS	iOS	Macintosh	PS3	Wii	Xbox 360
Metacritic	80/100	78/100	N/A	80/100	80/100	80/100

Review scores
Publication	Score					
Publication	DS	iOS	Macintosh	PS3	Wii	Xbox 360
Eurogamer	7/10	N/A	N/A	N/A	8/10	N/A
Famitsu	N/A	N/A	N/A	31/40	31/40	N/A
Game Informer	N/A	N/A	N/A	7.5/10	7.5/10	7.5/10
GamePro	N/A	N/A	N/A	N/A	3.75/5	N/A
GameSpot	N/A	N/A	N/A	7.5/10	7/10	7.5/10
GameSpy	N/A	N/A	N/A	4.5/5	4.5/5	4.5/5
GameTrailers	N/A	N/A	N/A	8.3/10	N/A	8.3/10
IGN	8/10	N/A	N/A	8/10	8/10	8/10
Macworld	N/A	N/A	3.5/5	N/A	N/A	N/A
Official Nintendo Magazine	N/A	N/A	N/A	N/A	82%	N/A
Official Xbox Magazine (US)	N/A	N/A	N/A	N/A	N/A	8.5/10
Pocket Gamer	4.5/5	4/5	N/A	N/A	N/A	N/A
PlayStation: The Official Magazine	N/A	N/A	N/A	4/5	N/A	N/A
TouchArcade	N/A	4.5/5	N/A	N/A	N/A	N/A
Digital Spy	N/A	N/A	N/A	N/A	4/5	N/A

The game received "favourable" reviews on all platforms according to the review aggregation website Metacritic. In Japan, where the PlayStation 3 and Wii versions were ported and published by Activision on 27 March 2008, Famitsu gave them each a score of three eights and one seven for a total of 31 out of 40.

In April 2009, the game was the fourth-highest selling on the Wii, and ninth for the DS. By 2 May 2009, the game's worldwide sales total exceeded 3.4 million. By June 2010, the game had achieved an ELSPA Gold sales award, indicating sales of 200,000 units in the UK. As of February 2017, the game is the best-selling Star Wars video game of all time, with sales of 15.29 million. It was the best-selling Lego video game of all-time until being surpassed by Lego Marvel Super Heroes in 2017.

Guinness World Records Gamer's Edition 2009 ranked The Complete Saga as the 23rd greatest video game of all time. The game was nominated for Favorite Video Game at the 2012 Kids' Choice Awards, but lost to Just Dance 3. The Nintendo DS version, which sold 4.7 million units, is the best-selling third party game of all time for the platform.
