= The Incredibles (franchise) =

Disney and Pixar media franchise

- Official franchise logo
- Created by: Brad Bird
- Developed by: John Lasseter Brad Bird John Walker
- Original work: The Incredibles (2004)
- Owners: Pixar Animation Studios (The Walt Disney Company)
- Years: 2004–present

Films and television
- Films: The Incredibles (2004); Incredibles 2 (2018); Incredibles 3 (2028)
- Short films: Jack-Jack Attack (2005); Mr. Incredible and Pals (2005); Auntie Edna (2018); Chore Day – The Incredibles Way (2021); Cookie Num Num (2021); Pizza Night (2024)

Games
- Video games: The Incredibles (2004); Rise of the Underminer (2005); Disney Infinity (2013)^{*}; Lego The Incredibles (2018)

Audio
- Soundtracks: The Incredibles; Incredibles 2

Miscellaneous
- Theme park attraction: Incredicoaster (2018–present)^{**}
- ^{*} Crossover work where this franchise's characters and/or settings appear.; ^{**} Roller coaster opened in 2001 as California Screamin'.

The Incredibles is an American animated film series media franchise made by Pixar. Beginning with the 2004 film The Incredibles, Brad Bird wrote and directed both films, and Craig T. Nelson, Holly Hunter, Sarah Vowell, and Samuel L. Jackson are part of the franchise's main cast. The first film, The Incredibles, was released on November 5, 2004, and received acclaim from critics, winning the Academy Award for Best Animated Feature. The second film, Incredibles 2, was released on June 15, 2018, and received mostly positive reviews and set the record for best opening weekend for an animated film with $183 million. The third film, Incredibles 3, is scheduled to release in 2028. The series has grossed a combined $1.8 billion worldwide.

The franchise takes place in a fictional universe where superheroes, also known as "Supers", co-exist with society and are occasionally forced into action despite a ban issued on them by the government. The setting of said universe is a retro-futuristic version of the early 1960s.

== Films ==
Film	Release date	Director	Screenplay by	Story by	Produced by
The Incredibles	November 5, 2004	Brad Bird	Brad Bird	Brad Bird	John Walker
Incredibles 2	June 15, 2018	Brad Bird	Brad Bird	Brad Bird	John Walker & Nicole Paradis Grindle
Incredibles 3	June 16, 2028	Peter Sohn	Brad Bird	Brad Bird	Dana Murray & Brad Bird (Note: Pixar Chief Creative Officer Pete Docter announced Brad Bird as executive producer of Incredibles 3 at an upcoming animation films presentation in June 2025. However, subsequent reports from the Walt Disney Company following the 2026 D23 Expo name Bird as another producer alongside Dana Murray without any executive classification.)

=== The Incredibles (2004) ===
The Incredibles is Pixar's sixth film. The story follows Robert "Bob" Parr and Helen Parr, a couple of superheroes known as Mr. Incredible and Elastigirl, that attempt to live a quiet mediocre suburban life with their three children as a result of a government mandate formed out of a series of lawsuits involving superheroes that forced them to retire from hero work and hide their powers and become ordinary citizens. However, Bob's desire of helping people draws the entire family into a confrontation with a vengeful fan-turned-foe.

=== Incredibles 2 (2018) ===
Incredibles 2 is Pixar's twentieth film. The film follows Helen as she is chosen by a telecommunications corporation to pull off a publicity stunt with the goal of regaining the public's trust in superheroes while Bob is left to care for their kids, Violet, Dash and Jack-Jack. However, the family is called into action once again when Helen clashes against a new foe who seeks to turn the populace against all superheroes.

=== Incredibles 3 (2028) ===
Following the release of Incredibles 2, director Brad Bird mentioned that the film's truncated production schedule resulted in many plotlines and ideas he had for the film being cut from the final version. He cited Pixar's decision in October 2016 to swap the release dates of Toy Story 4 and Incredibles 2, which meant that Bird's film lost a full year of production. Bird stated that the lingering plotlines could lead to a third installment, just as the plotlines of the first did with the second: "There were a lot of ideas that we had on this film that could be [used]... whether it's another Incredibles film, or something else". Cast members including Samuel L. Jackson and Sophia Bush have expressed interest in reprising their roles, with Bush strongly expressing her desires to have her character Voyd team up with Sarah Vowell's Violet for the third installment. Producer John Walker said of a potential third film: "I wouldn't ever rule it out. And if past is prologue, it'll be another 14 years — and a lot of people will probably need oxygen to make a third one". In August 2024 at the D23 event, Pixar CCO Pete Docter confirmed that a third film was in development with Bird returning. In June 2025, Peter Sohn was announced as the director while Bird will write the screenplay and executive produce the film. Docter revealed that Incredibles 3 and Coco 2 were set to be released in "2028 and beyond". In January 2026, Holly Hunter revealed that production and voice recording was scheduled to begin in March. On March 18, 2026, newly inducted Disney CEO Josh D'Amaro announced the release date to be June 16, 2028. On August 15, 2026, it was confirmed that Craig T. Nelson, Holly Hunter, Samuel L. Jackson, and Sarah Vowell will reprise their roles.

== Short films ==
=== Jack-Jack Attack (2004) ===
A short film was released on March 15, 2005, on the first film's DVD release, entitled Jack-Jack Attack. Bird returned to write and direct the short. It was originally conceived to be part of the first film, but decided to make it into a short. The short takes place during the events of the first film and follows Kari as she babysits Jack-Jack while discovering his newly awakened superpowers in the process.

=== Mr. Incredible and Pals (2005) ===
Another short film included on the first film's DVD release. The short is presented as an episode of a 1960s animated series animated in the style of Syncro-Vox (an animation technique famously used for Clutch Cargo). Craig T. Nelson and Samuel L. Jackson appear in character as Mr. Incredible and Frozone respectively in the short's commentary track.

=== Auntie Edna (2018) ===
A short film entitled Auntie Edna was released in Autumn 2018 with the film's digital, DVD and Blu-ray release of Incredibles 2. In a similar manner to Jack-Jack Attack, the short follows Edna during the events of Incredibles 2 as she babysits Jack-Jack while coping with his newly discovered powers.

=== Pixar Popcorn (2021) ===
Two short films entitled Chore Day – The Incredibles Way and Cookie Num Num, alongside eight other Pixar shorts, were released on Disney+ as part of the Pixar Popcorn series on January 22, 2021. Chore Day – The Incredibles Way follows the Parr family as they use their unique powers for daily chores. Cookie Num Num follows the Parr family as they race to eat the last cookie during midnight snack time.

== Video games ==
=== The Incredibles (2004) ===
A video game based on the film was developed by Heavy Iron Studios and published by THQ on October 31, 2004, for PlayStation 2, Microsoft Windows, Mac OS X, Game Boy Advance, GameCube, and Xbox.

=== The Incredibles: When Danger Calls (2004) ===
A PC game developed by ImaginEngine and published by THQ based on the 2004 film was released on November 3, 2004. It is a collection of 10 minigames, which are variations of common arcade games, including side-scrolling avoidance games, catch-something-falling exercises, and games that require players to hit buttons at the appropriate moment.

=== The Incredibles: Rise of the Underminer (2005) ===
A video game presented as a direct continuation of The Incredibles (until Incredibles 2 rendered it non-canon), released in October 24, 2005, for PlayStation 2, Microsoft Windows, Mac OS X, Game Boy Advance, GameCube, and Xbox, once again developed by Heavy Iron Studios and published by THQ. The game takes place after the events of the film and follows Mr. Incredible and Frozone as they face off against the Underminer as he prepares his attack on the Earth's surface.

=== Lego The Incredibles (2018) ===
A Lego video game adaptation based on the events of the first two films was developed by TT Fusion and released by Warner Bros. Interactive Entertainment on June 15, 2018, for Microsoft Windows, Nintendo Switch, PlayStation 4, and Xbox One coinciding with the release of Incredibles 2.

=== Other miscellaneous titles ===
The Incredibles have made appearances in other Disney-related video games. The core cast of characters appear in all three Disney Infinity games in which characters from the films appear as playable characters, with the first game featuring a play set based on the franchise, along with the members of the Parr family (except Jack-Jack) and Syndrome as playable characters. Kinect Rush: A Disney–Pixar Adventure for Xbox 360, Xbox One, and Windows 10, includes missions from various Pixar films including The Incredibles. The five members of the Parr family, Frozone and Syndrome appear as playable characters in Disney Magic Kingdoms, along with some attractions based on locations of the film. Additionally, the whole Parr family, Frozone, Syndrome, The Underminer, and Voyd are all playable heroes in Disney Heroes: Battle Mode. Likewise, Fortnite as part of their 2024 deal with Disney buying a 10% intake, would include playable skins of Mr. Incredible, Elastigirl and Frozone to celebrate the first film's 20th anniversary as revealed by Disney's annual D23 expo.

== Cast and characters ==
List indicators

This section includes characters who will appear or have appeared in the franchise.

- An empty grey cell indicates the character was not in the film, or that the character's official presence has not yet been confirmed.
- ^{A} indicates an appearance through archival footage or audio.
- ^{E} indicates an appearance not included in the theatrical cut.

Characters	Theatrical films			Video games		Short films				
Characters	The Incredibles	Incredibles 2	Incredibles 3	The Incredibles: When Danger Calls	The Incredibles: Rise of the Underminer	Jack-Jack Attack	Mr. Incredible and Pals	Auntie Edna	Pixar Popcorn	Lego Pixar: Bricktoons
Robert "Bob" Parr Mr. Incredible	Craig T. Nelson	Craig T. Nelson	Craig T. Nelson	Richard McGonagle	Richard McGonagle		Pete Docter Craig T. Nelson (Note: Nelson appeared in-character as Bob Parr / Mr. Incredible on the shorts' DVD commentary.)	Craig T. Nelson	Craig T. Nelson	Craig T. Nelson
Helen Parr Elastigirl / Mrs. Incredible	Holly Hunter	Holly Hunter	Holly Hunter	Elizabeth Daily	Silent cameo				Holly Hunter	Holly Hunter
Violet Parr	Sarah Vowell	Sarah Vowell	Sarah Vowell	Sarah Vowell	Silent cameo				Silent role	Sarah Vowell
Dashiell "Dash" Parr	Spencer Fox	Huck Milner	TBA	Spencer Fox	Silent cameo				Huck Milner	Banks Pierce
John Jackson "Jack-Jack" Parr	Eli Fucile	Eli Fucile	TBA	Eli Fucile	Silent cameo	Eli Fucile		Eli Fucile	Eli Fucile	Baby sounds only
John Jackson "Jack-Jack" Parr	Nicholas Bird (Note: Bird stood in as the voice of Jack-Jack in scenes in which the character transformed into a monster.)	Maeve Andrews	TBA	Eli Fucile	Silent cameo	Eli Fucile		Maeve Andrews	Eli Fucile	Baby sounds only
John Jackson "Jack-Jack" Parr	Nicholas Bird	Maeve Andrews	TBA	Eli Fucile	Silent cameo	Eli Fucile		Nicholas Bird	Eli Fucile	Baby sounds only
John Jackson "Jack-Jack" Parr	Nicholas Bird	Maeve Andrews	TBA	Eli Fucile	Silent cameo	Eli Fucile		Noelle Zuber	Eli Fucile	Baby sounds only
Lucius Best Frozone	Samuel L. Jackson	Samuel L. Jackson	Samuel L. Jackson	Samuel L. Jackson	Philip Lawrence		Michael Asberry Samuel L. Jackson (Note: Jackson appeared in-character as Lucius Best / Frozone on the shorts' DVD commentary.)			
Edna "E" Mode	Brad Bird	Brad Bird	Brad Bird	Brad Bird				Brad Bird		
Rick Dicker	Bud Luckey	Jonathan Banks	TBA			Bud Luckey				
Tony Rydinger	Michael Bird	Michael Bird	Michael Bird	Michael Bird^{A}						
Honey Best	Kimberly Adair Clark	Kimberly Adair Clark								
Buddy Pine Syndrome	Jason Lee	Deleted scene		Jason Lee		Jason Lee				Jason Lee
Mirage	Elizabeth Peña			Elizabeth Peña^{A}						
Mr. Gilbert Huph	Wallace Shawn									
Bernie Kropp	Lou Romano			Lou Romano						
Principal John Walker	Wayne Canney			Wayne Canney^{A}						
Bomb Voyage	Dominique Louis									
Kari McKeen	Bret Parker	Bret Parker^{E}				Bret Parker				
Rusty McAllister	Nicholas Bird^{U}	Deleted scene								
Mrs. Hoganson	Jean Sincere			Jean Sincere^{A}						
The Underminer	John Ratzenberger	John Ratzenberger			John Ratzenberger					
Evelyn Deavor Screenslaver		Catherine Keener								
Winston Deavor		Bob Odenkirk	TBA							
Karen Voyd		Sophia Bush								
Krushauer		Phil LaMarr								
He-Lectrix		Phil LaMarr								
Gus Burns Reflux		Paul Eiding								
Ambassador Henrietta Selick		Isabella Rossellini								
Chad Brentley		Adam Gates								
Mayor of New Urbem		Barry Bostwick								
Pizza Guy Screenslaver (decoy)		Bill Wise								
Lady Lightbug							Celia Schuman			
Chef										Megan Rees

Note: A dark grey cell indicates that the character did not appear in that medium.

== Crew ==
Role	Films		
Role	The Incredibles	Incredibles 2	Incredibles 3
Director	Brad Bird	Brad Bird	Peter Sohn
Producer(s)	John Walker	John Walker; Nicole Paradis Grindle	Dana Murray; Brad Bird
Writer(s)	Brad Bird	Brad Bird	Brad Bird
Executive Producer(s)	John Lasseter	John Lasseter	Pete Docter; Jonas Rivera; Jim Morris
Composer	Michael Giacchino	Michael Giacchino	TBA
Editor	Stephen Schaffer	Stephen Schaffer	TBA
Cinematographer(s)	Andrew Jimenez; Patrick Lin; Janet Lucroy	Mahyar Abousaeedi; Erik Smitt	TBA
Studio	Pixar Animation Studios	Pixar Animation Studios	Pixar Animation Studios
Distributor	Walt Disney Studios Motion Pictures	Walt Disney Studios Motion Pictures	Walt Disney Studios Motion Pictures

== Production ==
=== Production for the first film ===
The Incredibles as a concept dates back to 1993 when Bird sketched the family during a period in which he tried to break into film. Personal issues had percolated into the story as they weighed on him in life. During this time, Bird had inked a production deal with Warner Bros. Animation and was in the process of directing his first feature, The Iron Giant. Approaching middle age and having high aspirations for his filmmaking, Bird pondered whether his career goals were attainable only at the price of his family life. He stated, "Consciously, this was just a funny movie about superheroes. But I think that what was going on in my life definitely filtered into the movie." After the box office failure of The Iron Giant, Bird gravitated toward his superhero story.

He imagined it as a homage to the 1960s comic books and spy films from his boyhood and he initially tried to develop it as a 2D cel animation. When The Iron Giant became a box office bomb, he reconnected with old friend John Lasseter at Pixar in March 2000 and pitched his story idea to him. Bird and Lasseter knew each other from their college years at CalArts in the 1970s. Lasseter was sold on the idea and convinced Bird to come to Pixar, where the film would be done in computer animation. The studio announced a multi-film contract with Bird on May 4, 2000, breaking Pixar's mold of having directors who had all risen through the ranks. The Incredibles was written and directed solely by Brad Bird, a departure from previous Pixar productions which typically had two or three directors and as many screenwriters. In addition, it would be the company's first film in which all characters are human.

"The dad is always expected in the family to be strong, so I made him strong. The moms are always pulled in a million different directions, so I made her stretch like taffy. Teenagers, particularly teenage girls, are insecure and defensive, so I made her turn invisible and turn on shields. And ten-year-old boys are hyperactive energy balls. Babies are unrealized potential."

— Brad Bird, writer and director of The Incredibles.

=== Production for the second film ===
Following the first film, Brad Bird directed his next film for Pixar, Ratatouille, which was released in June 2007. Near its premiere, Bird said he was open to an idea of a sequel to The Incredibles, but only if it could be even better than the original. He stated, "I have pieces that I think are good, but I don't have them all together."

In a May 2013 interview, Bird reiterated his interest in a sequel: "I have been thinking about it. People think that I have not been, but I have—because I love those characters, and love that world." He added: "I am stroking my chin and scratching my head. I have many, many elements that I think would work really well in another Incredibles film, and if I can get 'em to click all together, I would probably wanna do that." While publicizing the first film, Bird had already conceptualized the eventual approach where Bob and Helen would switch roles, and Jack-Jack would develop multiple powers yet known by the family.

Pixar announced in November 2016 that both Holly Hunter and Samuel L. Jackson would return to reprise their roles, and at the July 2017 D23 Expo that both Craig T. Nelson and Sarah Vowell would also return with them. Spencer Fox, the original voice of Dashiell "Dash" Parr, was replaced in the sequel by younger newcomer Huck Milner. Also that July, Brad Bird and John Ratzenberger were confirmed as reprising their characters from the first film.

In November 2017, Pixar announced that Bob Odenkirk and Catherine Keener had been signed to the cast, but did not disclose their roles as new characters Winston and Evelyn Deavor until a later date. In January 2018, it was announced that Sophia Bush and Isabella Rossellini would voice new characters Voyd and The Ambassador, while Jonathan Banks would voice Rick Dicker, after the character's original voice actor, Bud Luckey, retired in 2014; after his death in 2018, the film was dedicated to Luckey's memory.

== Health concerns ==
Many disability advocates, including the Epilepsy Foundation, have raised concerns that scenes in Incredibles 2 with flashing lights, particularly the scene of Elastigirl's fight with a Screenslaver henchman, can trigger seizures in viewers affected by photosensitive epilepsy. Because of this, several theaters posted warnings for audiences with this condition. Disney issued a statement to USA Today stating that they appreciated the efforts the theaters had already made in making signs warning people seeing the movie. They then advised theaters to warn audiences about the scene in a sign that read, "Incredibles 2 contains a sequence of flashing lights, which may affect customers who are susceptible to photosensitive epilepsy or other photosensitivities".

== Reception ==
=== Box office performance ===
Film	U.S. release date	Box office gross			All-time ranking		Budget	Ref.
Film	U.S. release date	U.S. and Canada	Other territories	Worldwide	U.S. and Canada	Worldwide	Budget	Ref.
The Incredibles	November 5, 2004	$261,441,092	$370,000,000	$631,441,092	118	154	$92 million	
Incredibles 2	June 15, 2018	$608,581,744	$634,223,615	$1,242,805,359	11	19	$200 million	
Total		$870,022,836	$1,004,223,615	$1,874,246,451	28	41	$292 million	

=== Critical and public response ===
Film	Critical		Public		
Film	Rotten Tomatoes	Metacritic	CinemaScore	PostTrak	
Film	The Incredibles	97% (248 reviews)	90 (41 reviews)	A+	—N/a
Incredibles 2	93% (385 reviews)	80 (51 reviews)	A+	92%	
Incredibles3

=== Academy Awards ===
Category	The Incredibles	Incredibles 2
Best Animated Feature	Won	Nominated
Best Original Screenplay	Nominated	
Best Sound Editing	Won	
Best Sound Mixing	Nominated	

== Chronology ==
Chronological order of the The Incredibles franchise history:

1. Mr. Incredible and Pals (2005)
2. The Incredibles (2004)
3. Jack-Jack Attack (2005)
4. Incredibles 2 (2018)
5. Auntie Edna (2018)
6. Chore Day – The Incredibles Way (2021)
7. Cookie Num Num (2021)
8. Pizza Night (2024)
