= Dash Parr =

Character from The Incredibles

- The Incredibles character
- Dash Parr as he appears in Incredibles 2
- First appearance: The Incredibles (2004)
- Created by: Brad Bird
- Voiced by: Spencer Fox (1st film, video game, When Danger Calls, commercials); Huck Milner (2nd film, Lego The Incredibles); Raymond Ochoa (Kinect Rush: A Disney-Pixar Adventure, Disney Infinity series); Henry Witchter (Disney Speedstorm)

In-universe information
- Full name: Dashiell Robert Parr
- Nickname: Dash
- Species: Human
- Occupation: Elementary school student Superhero
- Family: Bob Parr (father); Helen Parr (mother); Violet Parr (older sister); Jack-Jack Parr (younger brother)
- Abilities: Superhuman speed

Dashiell Robert "Dash" Parr is a fictional superhero who appears in Pixar's animated superhero film The Incredibles (2004) and its sequel Incredibles 2 (2018). The character is voiced by Spencer Fox in the first film and Huck Milner in the second film. Restless, relentless and curious, Dash sports a hearty sense of adventure and a boundless supply of energy. Born with the remarkable power of superhuman speed, he longs to be free to use his powers at his leisure, and chafes against the admonishment by his parents, in particular his mother, that his powers must be kept a secret.

== Development ==
When designing the Parrs, Brad Bird wanted each of their superpowers to be related to their personality. Observing that 10-year-old boys are prone to hyperactivity, he conceived Dash as "the average 10-year-old boy that can move twice as fast as anybody else".

The filmmakers cast rising eleven-year-old Spencer Fox who made his feature film debut in the 2004 film The Incredibles to voice the diminutive and mischievous son of Bob and Helen Parr. Brad Bird wanted to give Dash a realistic out-of-breath voice in certain scenes such as the jungle scene so he made Fox run four laps around the Pixar studio until he got tired. Due to Fox's voice maturing he was replaced by 10-year-old newcomer Huck Milner in the sequel.

Producer John Walker said of Dash in the sequel, "Dash got a taste of life as a crime fighter in the first film. Returning to regular life doesn't really interest him—he loved fighting crime with his family and, even better, showing off just how fast he can be."

== Powers and abilities ==
Dash possesses the superhuman capacity to move at great speeds. This power enables him to run faster than any conventional human beings are able to, and even to run over water without submerging. It also enables him to punch at superhuman speed. In one scene in the first film, Elastigirl shapeshifts into a raft, and Dash is able to use his ability to kick in a super-fast manner to function as its outboard motor. Dash's increased speed also gives him superhuman reflexes. Edna Mode designed his super suit to be resistant to the air friction, wear, and heat generated when Dash runs at superhuman speed.

== Personality ==
Dash, as described by Helen, is a "highly competitive boy, and a bit of a showoff". Dash believes that he shouldn't be ashamed of his abilities or need to hide them, believing it makes him special. Joshua Tyler of CinemaBlend described the character thus: "He's completely in love with his superpowers, the way any kid would be if he knew he could run at the speed of sound. He's crazy for adventure, drunk with the idea of being a hero and for him The Incredibles is one fantastic game where he's finally allowed to run as fast as he can".

== Appearances ==
In the 2004 film The Incredibles, Dash complains that his mother, Helen, will not allow him to play school sports, because she thinks that he would use his super-speed and blow the family's civilian cover. She is also upset when he uses his power to play a prank on his teacher, Bernie Kropp, which can also threaten their cover.

As Helen prepares to go after Dash's father, Bob, who she discovers is on Syndrome's island, Dash and his sister, Violet, discover the supersuits Edna Mode made for them. Donning the one made for him, Dash calls himself The Dash. He and Violet stow away on Helen's plane, and the three of them barely survive its destruction by Syndrome, Dash and Violet are left to fend for themselves in the island's jungles as Helen goes after a captured Bob. Before leaving them in a cave, Helen tells Dash that if they encounter danger, he should run as fast as he can to protect himself, the first time Dash is allowed to do so. The cave turns out to be the end of the flame bucket for Syndrome's rocket launch mount and the children are forced to flee the cave when it lifts off. After a night in the jungle, they are discovered and must defend themselves when they are confronted by Syndrome's henchmen. This proves to be the first time Dash is able to fully explore the extent and application of his powers, which allow him to evade his pursuers, best them in fistfights, quickly generate cover by kicking up dirt, and even run on water. He and Violet also discover that when they combine his speed with her force field powers, they can create a spherical force field that can traverse water. Nonetheless, Syndrome captures all four family members. After Violet frees them, they travel back to Metro City, Dash and his family, along with Frozone, work together to defeat Syndrome's Omnidroid. A few months later, Dash's parents allow him to participate in the track & field practice, but urge him to pull back on first place, as a way to avoid using his powers too conspicuously. When the villainous Underminer emerges from beneath the ground, Dash joins his family in donning his mask in preparation to confront the criminal.

In the 2018 sequel Incredibles 2, as Helen pursues the Screenslaver as part of a publicity campaign to rehabilitate the image of superheroes in the mind of the public, Bob spends more time with Dash and Violet. Bob struggles to help Dash with his math homework, in light of his lack of familiarity with how the children of Dash's generation are taught math. For his part, Dash entertains dreams of firing the rockets of his father's high-tech car, the Incredimobile. When his family is confronted at their home by a group of superheroes being mind-controlled by Evelyn Deavor, Frozone is captured, and Dash, Violet and their infant brother Jack-Jack escape in the Incredimobile. They travel to Everjust, the yacht of Evelyn's brother, Winston, where they free the superheroes, including their parents and Frozone, from Evelyn's mind control, leading to Evelyn's defeat and arrest. At the end of the film, after Dash accompanies his family in dropping off Violet and her date, Tony Rydinger, at a movie theater, the family sees a high-speed chase in progress, and once again goes into action.

== Reception ==
Hypable ranked Dash the sixth-best Incredibles 2 superhero, with author Aaron Locke writing "Still young and learning important virtues like patience and restraint, Dash is full of potential that could make him a powerful superhero". Ana Luisa Suarez of Hollywood.com considers Dash celebrating victory as one of "15 Reasons Why 'The Incredibles' Is The Best Superhero Movie" Jonathon Dornbush of IGN identified "Dash's desire to be his full self in a society that may not want him to" among the reasons he believes The Incredibles remains one of Pixar's best. The Washington Post's Jennifer Frey described Dash as "the classic rambunctious little boy, driven nuts by the fact that his superhuman speed prevents him from being able to join any sports teams".

Some critics complained that the character was underused in the sequel, and relegated to being only a comic device. CNET contributor Mike Sorrentino wrote that the film's emphasis on Helen and Bob results in Dash being "relegated to the sidelines for most of the film". Molly Freeman observed that the character arc "largely exist[s] to serve Bob's own storyline" and stated that "Dash receives less screen time, and even less development as a result, with him providing little more than comedic relief".

Critics praised Huck Milner for his performance of Dash in the sequel. Writing for Vulture, Edelstein praised Milner's performance for Dash "Huck Milner does justice to his first name—he could be Huck Finn or Tom Sawyer or any drivingly inquisitive kid hero". The New Yorker's Anthony Lane also praise Milner saying "the high-speed Dash, has been updated; his lines are now spoken, I rejoice to say, by a young actor named Huck Milner. It's ideal for Dash, whose permanent aim is to race around the river bend, as it were, and see what adventures await".
