= Violet Parr =

Main character of The Incredibles

- The Incredibles character
- Violet Parr as she appears in Incredibles 2
- First appearance: The Incredibles (2004)
- Created by: Brad Bird
- Voiced by: Sarah Vowell

In-universe information
- Full name: Violet Parr
- Nickname: Vi
- Species: Human
- Occupation: Middle school student Superhero
- Family: Bob Parr (father); Helen Parr (mother); Dash Parr (younger brother); Jack-Jack Parr (youngest brother)
- Significant other: Tony Rydinger
- Abilities: Invisibility; Force field generation and manipulation

Violet Parr is a fictional superheroine in Pixar's animated superhero film The Incredibles (2004) and its sequel, Incredibles 2 (2018). The eldest child and only daughter of superheroes Bob and Helen Parr (Mr. Incredible and Elastigirl), Violet is born with the superhuman abilities to render herself invisible and generate force fields. Voiced by Sarah Vowell, Violet is a shy junior high school student who longs to fit in with her peers, a task she believes is hindered by her superpowers. Throughout the course of the films, Violet matures and gradually becomes more confident in herself and her powers.

Violet's creator, screenwriter and director Brad Bird, decided to give her invisibility because he felt that this specific superpower represents some of the challenges teenage girls experience growing up, namely insecurity and defensiveness. Bird cast Vowell as Violet upon hearing her contribute a real-life story about her father to the radio program This American Life, with Violet ultimately becoming Vowell's first voice-acting role. Vowell identified with the character's shy, insecure nature, in addition to observing parallels between Violet's relationship with Bob and her relationship with her own father. New computer technology was developed to animate Violet's hair, which animators described as the most difficult part of The Incredibles since that much hair had never been featured in a computer-animated film before. The character's hair serves as an important aspect of Violet's character development, which demonstrates her growing self-confidence as she gradually ceases to hide behind it.

Reception towards Violet has been positive, with film critics commending her character development and relatability, as well as Vowell's vocal performance. Critics have also heavily compared Violet to the comic book superheroine the Invisible Woman, whose superpowers she shares. The character's likeness has since been used in several tie-in media and merchandise associated with the films, including toys, books and video game adaptations.

== Development ==
=== Creation and casting ===
Screenwriter and director Brad Bird conceived Violet as "a 14-year-old teenage girl who just wants to be invisible". In early drafts of the screenplay, Violet was depicted as an infant as opposed to a teenager, since parents Bob and Helen Parr were originally intended to be introduced as retired superheroes much earlier during the film. Violet is voiced by American author and actress Sarah Vowell, who related that she was offered the role unexpectedly. While beginning to cast the film's main characters, Bird had been listening to the National Public Radio program This American Life, to which Vowell is a frequent contributor. During one of Vowell's regular appearances on the show, Bird heard her contribute an anecdote about a cannon she had helped her father, a gunsmith, build. Bird wanted to cast Vowell based on her description of the event, deciding that she was "perfect" for the role, which he immediately called to offer her. Vowell had already earned a reputation for declining several voice acting jobs prior to The Incredibles, to the point at which her agent warned Bird not to waste his time. However, Vowell states that she simply avoided pursuing voice roles in general because she was content being a writer and found few animated projects particularly interesting prior to The Incredibles.

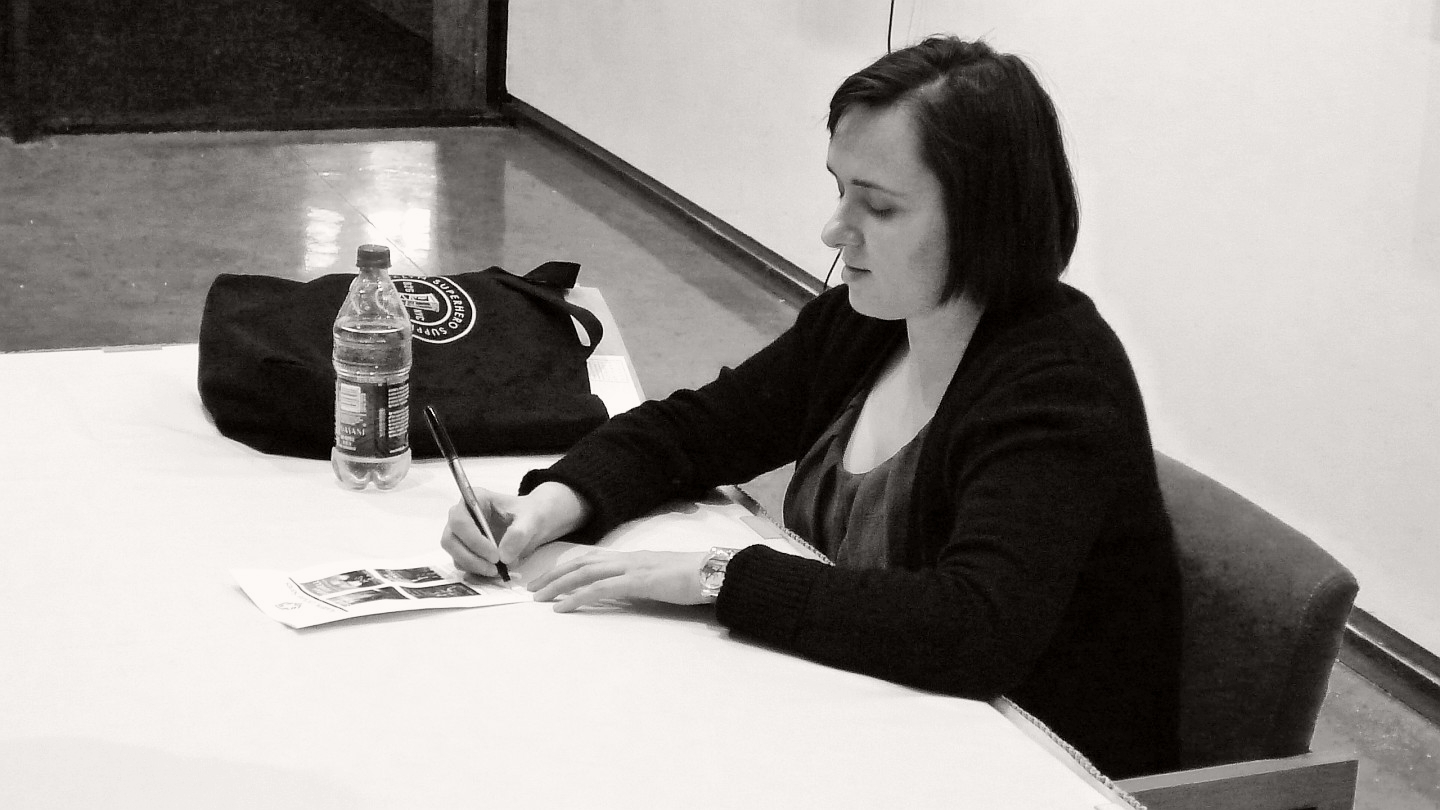
Violet is voiced by author and radio personality Sarah Vowell (pictured), a role director Brad Bird cast her in after hearing her recall a childhood story about her father on the radio program This American Life. Violet was Vowell's first voice acting role.

The animators animated a rough test sequence to some of Vowell's dialogue from the radio segment about her father's cannon, in which Violet is depicted being startled by a gun that repeatedly fires in her hands. Despite experiencing some hesitation due to having never voiced an animated character before, Vowell accepted the role after receiving an e-mail from the film's producer, agreeing to participate in The Incredibles because she believes that Pixar is consistently "the best at what they do", comparing the offer to politician Nelson Mandela "asking for your help to fight racism". She had also been a long-time fan of Bird's work as a filmmaker. Vowell ultimately accepted the role based on a sole image she had been sent of the character: a drawing of Violet surrounded by her schoolmates, all of whom appear to be happy and outgoing apart from Violet herself, who is instead hunched over and hiding behind her hair. Vowell concluded, "I can be that kid. I was that kid. I love that archetype of the morose, shy, smart-alecky teenage girl."

IndieWire contributor Oliver Lyttelton believes that Vowell was the most unexpected of Bird's casting decisions. Vowell has said that, like Violet, she herself "is a little smart-alecky and also has a weird dad with a strange hobby", finding the unique dynamic between Violet and Bob similar to her relationship with her own father, particularly the combination of affection, sarcasm and confusion that both she and her character feel towards their respective parents. Vowell expounded that she tends to resemble "a wise guy" in conversation with her father and believes that her tone of voice possibly influenced Bird's decision to cast her as a teenager. Vowell admitted that she shares Violet's "inability to stop pushing people's buttons", citing their tendency to voice their opinions about any given topic and gift for making various situations awkward as similarities.

=== Voice ===
Sarah Vowell found the recording process somewhat similar to working in radio, apart from the fact that the process required more standing, gesturing and working closely with a director. The film also required Vowell to deviate from her typically underplayed, deadpan delivery due to animation being broader in tone and demanding more "exclamation", identifying the process as more similar to stage than film acting because, like the former, "animation ... require[s] more and bigger things." She revealed that voicing a teenage girl involved more acting than she had been expecting since she was "raised to be a stoic person." For the scene in which Violet and her family's plane crashes into the ocean, Vowell drank from a water bottle while gurgling and gulping to simulate the sound of a person drowning. Despite using a towel as a bib, Vowell still got considerably wet during the process. Vowell found the process of producing non-verbal sounds such as laughing, yawning and screaming on cue to be the most difficult component of the job, a task that working in radio had hardly prepared her for. During her first recording session, the actress struggled to sound as though she had just been hurt and thus asked Bird to hit her arm to help her replicate the sound of being punched. Vowell recorded her character's screams closer towards the end of filming in order to preserve her voice, calling the process "fun" and claiming, "I don't think I had screamed ... for about 20 years" at that point.

Vowell found the opportunity to voice a superheroine "thrilling" because she considers herself to be "more of a walking Woody Allen movie" in real life due to her fears of driving and swimming, joking that it is "fun to listen to my voice do things [in film] that ... it would never get to do." Vowell also admitted that she tends to sound "cartoonish" and young for her age, elaborating that voicing Violet "lead[s] into some of my insecurities ... when you worry you sound like a cartoon and then someone sends me a message [asking] do I want to be in an animated movie … I guess I am who I am." Bird maintains that Vowell "knocked it out of the park" with her performance, although Vowell claims that her acting required a lot of additional direction due to being less experienced, believing that Bird was drawn to "the extra challenge of an unformed performer." Producer Nicole Paradis Grindle agreed that Vowell "genuinely thinks the way Brad [Bird] wants Violet to think", which contribute to her deliveries being "spot-on". Despite her success, Vowell maintains that she is not an actress, describing herself as merely "a writer moonlighting" as an actress for The Incredibles and insisting that she would be "mortified" if she were required to act in the presence of anyone apart from Bird, whose directing she trusts greatly, explaining, "I trust that he'll be able to find something in me or he'll be able to inspire something in me, and he'll also be able to find the take that is the best one."

Vowell stars in a documentary about her work in the film, Vowellet: An Essay by Sarah Vowell, which is included as a bonus feature on The Incredibles' 2004 DVD release. In the "video essay", Vowell discusses the various differences between voicing a superhero and becoming an action figure while she was writing about presidential assassinations, contrasting the two distinct careers. The animators also animated Violet to some of Vowell's dialogue from the documentary. Bird, who voices costume designer Edna Mode, was the only other actor Vowell recorded with while working on both films. The director would sometimes temporarily provide the voices of other characters for Vowell to act opposite of, such as Elastigirl in lieu of actress Holly Hunter. For Incredibles 2, Vowell had not been allowed to read the entire script while recording her dialogue, having only been allowed to preview small excerpts in which Violet is speaking or having conversations with other characters. Until watching the film for the first time, Vowell had been under the impression that Incredibles 2 would mostly be about Violet's anger at her father until experiencing the film's other storylines and characters. Despite 14 years separating the releases of the first and second films, Vowell did not find resuming the role to be difficult, identifying Violet as a character to whom she feels "closely tied", having played her for approximately one-third of her life. Syfy Wire's Heather Mason observed that Vowell shares her dry sense of humor with Violet. To-date, the Incredibles films remain Vowell's only animated film roles.

=== Personality and design ===
Bird had always been more interested in developing the personalities of the film's main characters than their superpowers. When it came time to determine the Parr family's powers, Bird decided to draw inspiration from the roles of typical nuclear family members, basing both their superpowers and personalities on these traditional archetypes. Describing Violet as "a typical teenager ... not comfortable in her own skin" who resides "in that rocky place between being a kid and an adult", Bird felt that invisibility would be the most suitable power for the Parr family's only daughter. Describing her as a young woman who would much prefer if other people avoided looking at her, Bird elaborated that some teenage girls are prone to feeling insecure and defensive, and thus gave her the abilities to become invisible and create protective shields. According to Vowell, Violet's superpowers of invisibility and force fields are, much like the rest of her family, "psychologically representational of who she is"; a teenage girl who longs to remain hidden and protected; the actress described her as a young woman "trapped between childhood and maturity, between self-confidence and insecurity" like many teenagers. Bird sought to balance the adventurous and "ordinary" components of the family's lives, explaining that audiences would appreciate and relate to moments when Violet uses her powers in the event that she feels humiliated. In terms of music, composer Michael Giacchino developed a theme for Violet that he described as "coy and mysterious".

Although the films are set roughly during the 1950s and 1960s, shading art director Bryn Imagire opted to incorporate a more modern style into Violet's wardrobe, feeling that the hourglass silhouette, poofy skirts and tight shirts young women typically wore during this time period were not as suitable for the character due to her shy, withdrawn personality and hairstyle. Although the animators admitted to using mid-century fashion "as a jumping-off point", they deliberately designed Violet's clothes to be more baggy in appearance with a "very desaturated" color scheme, incorporating a variety of cut-off jeans, sneakers and sweaters into her attire to compliment her rebellious personality. Furthermore, the majority of the character's clothing during the first film are variations of the color purple, alluding to her name. Violet was costumed in a pink shirt towards the end of the film in order to demonstrate that she is now "much more open– sort of like she's blossoming as a teenager." Imagire identified the character as "the perfect example of where we didn't go mid-century; we went modern with her" instead. For the sequel, the increasing complexity of Violet's force fields required the animators to create new effects; although they remain visually similar to the first film, Violet "is able to do more with her force fields, so we had to figure out how that changes the look of her force fields," including sound effects and static as they interact with other objects, according to effects supervisor Bill Watral.

=== Hair ===
The Incredibles required the use of computer technology that was particularly advanced for its time, some of which computers had not yet been "taught". Computers were used to simulate hair movement and determine where hair was intended to be placed on the film's respective characters. Described as a new and time-consuming process at the time, new programs and approaches were developed and implemented to assist the animators in animating Violet's hair. Since organic materials are still considered to be among the most challenging objects to animate in computer animation, Violet's hair proved to be the most difficult subject for the animators to master. Although scale models of Violet and the film's major characters were first sculpted in clay by artist Kent Melton, the animators initially struggled to replicate Melton's very detailed interpretation of Violet's hair. According to hair and cloth simulation supervisor Mark Henne, Violet's hair remained an "unsolved research project" for much of the film's production due to its type and length, which had never been featured in a computer-animated film prior to The Incredibles.

For the majority of the film's production, Violet's character model was entirely bald. Producer John Walker frequently pleaded with the animators to give the character some form of hair, to which they would respond, "the hair is still theoretical"; it remained as such until significantly late into completion. Vowell recalled seeing only a bald iteration of her character for most of her recording process. Technical director Rick Sayre explained that the challenges revolving around Violet's hair were rooted in the fact that she has "no fixed hair style"; her hair constantly adopts new shapes and forms as it interacts with other objects, including other strands of her own hair, as well as her own body. Despite its challenges, the filmmakers resisted temptation to give the character a shorter, more manageable hairstyle, insisting on keeping Violet's hair long because its length plays an integral role in her story arc; Violet "is all about the fact that she hides behind her long straight bluish-black hair ... It's such a crucial part of the character that we had to get it right." Violet is also the only member of her family to have bluish-black hair; her father, mother and younger brother each have blonde, brown and blonde hair, respectively. Bird explained that Violet's hair color is the result of a recessive gene.

Violet's hair required animators a total of six months to fully render. Henne and the animators sculpted five different hairstyles for the character to be used during various moments in the film, which were modified and adjusted accordingly to suit different circumstances and environmental conditions such as rain, wind and the zero-gravity effects of her own force fields. Ultimately, Violet's hair became one of the film's greatest accomplishments, which Sayre has since deemed "a significant advance in showing hair move in a believable manner while retaining its stylistic look ... no one had ever animated this kind of hair before for a CG film." The difficulty surrounding Violet's hair ultimately influenced Mirage's hairstyle, which was originally quite long until Sayre begged the filmmakers to adopt it into a shorter and "cooler" variation due to the amount of time and effort that had already been spent on creating Violet's hair. Due to the technological advancements that computer animation has undergone since the original film was released, for the sequel animators were able to revisit and replicate Melton's more intricate, original design for Violet's hair, which "flows much more freely" in Incredibles 2. Despite these achievements, however, simulation supervisor Tiffany Erickson Klohn admitted that animating the character's hair remained challenging due to its requirement to be "silky and straight" but be subject to "some breakup" during action-oriented sequences, combined with the fact that Violet has a larger head despite being small in frame, meaning that "there's very little for her hair to rest on" when she moves. According to character art director Matt Nolte, the filmmakers agreed that Violet's hair would be worn back entirely for the sequel to emphasize "that she's not scared anymore."

== Characterization and themes ==
=== Insecurity, introversion and sarcasm ===
Originally depicted as a shy, timid and socially withdrawn girl, Violet finds it difficult to fit in among her peers and thus prefers to remain unnoticed. According to Alissa Wilkinson of Rolling Stone, the character's longing "to hide is familiar to virtually anyone who's ever been an awkward" teenager. Film critic Roger Ebert observed that the superhero life occasionally proves to be "too much" for Violet; she longs to be normal like her peers despite the fact that she is anything but, originally insisting that youngest brother Jack-Jack is the only "normal" member of her family since the infant had yet to exhibit signs of having superpowers. She has a tendency to hide behind her long black hair, which initially conceals most of her face for much of the film. She wears dark colors, representing the fact that she can be a particularly moody character. At times her appearance and dark-colored wardrobe have been described as "goth"; Mark Halverson of Sacramento News & Review wrote that "Violet hides behind a goth persona when not using her invisibility or force field to repel human contact." A writer for IGN likened the way in which Violet's hair drapes across her face to actress Veronica Lake. However, she grows more confident in both herself and her abilities as the film progresses, eventually emerging from behind her hair, using a headband to wear her it back and adopting a more colorful wardrobe. Grindle explained that the character successfully "turned a corner at the end of the first movie" to the point of which she is finally able to ask her crush on a date, which she partially attributes to her beginning to believe in herself as a result of fighting crime alongside her family. Violet is 14 years old with a slender build, small waistline, and long legs, she stands at 160cm (5'3") and weighs 41kg (90lbs). She has a circular head, fair skin, pink lips, rosy cheeks, long, straight, black hair with purple highlights (which covers the right side of her face in the first half of the first film), and bluish-purple eyes. Following the events of the first film, she wears purple and pink headbands to keep her hair back. Her supersuit consists of a red unitard with black bottoms and an "I" insignia on the chest, along with an orange belt, black gloves, thigh-high black heeled boots, and a black eye mask. She also wears an orange headband with her red supersuit.

According to the character's official character description in press releases for Incredibles 2, Violet is socially awkward, outspoken, sarcastic, intelligent and reserved, while Pixar's website describes her as "a typical shy, insecure teenage girl stuck at the crossroads between child and woman." Maiden USA: Girl Icons Come of Age author Kathleen Sweeney dubbed the character a "shrinking violet" who has a tendency to mumble and come off as angry. Similarly describing her as a shrinking violet, ReelViews' James Berardinelli observed that Violet "has entered that gawky stage of life when her body becomes uncomfortable to inhabit." Identifying her as an "oral character", John Kundert-Gibbs, author of Action!: Acting Lessons for CG Animators, Violet's main character arc revolves around transitioning "from being invisible to visible to others." According to Daphne Carr, author of Nine Inch Nails' Pretty Hate Machine, Violet adheres to "the archetype of the introverted, introspective artist-type kid." Oliver Lyttelton of IndieWire believes that Violet has more in common with actress Thora Birch's character Enid in the film Ghost World (2001) than most teenage girls. Observing that Bird approached the character designs in a manner that is "less cute" and more edgy than previous Pixar characters, Jeff Otto of IGN likened Violet to the goth teenager Lydia Deetz (Winona Ryder) from the film Beetlejuice (1988).

In Incredibles 2, female characters contribute a more central role to the plot, with Todd McCarthy of The Hollywood Reporter observing that Violet has begun "to spread her wings". However, she remains an awkward teenage girl "with the power to make herself invisible (although not, sadly, to make the boy she has a crush on really see her)", according to Slate's Sam Adams, with the film exploring her "adolescent, boy-crazed sanity" and first broken heart, to which she reacts by consuming ice cream and throwing her clothes. At times, Violet can be so concerned with her own struggles that she fails to notice some of the situations that are affecting the rest of her family, although she maintains the importance of family. Vowell observed that Violet's temper is explored much further in Incredibles 2, in which she cries and yells out of annoyance and passion, summarizing the character as "a hormonal teenager." The actress believes that her character "can be hilarious" at times, "but her humor has some bite to it ... She has a tendency to comment a little too truthfully about any given scenario ... For better or worse, if she thinks it, she says it", describing Violet as incapable of "edit[ing] uncomfortable thoughts." According to Syfy Wire's Heather Mason, Violet's role in the sequel is to "break the tension and bring the superheroes back to reality" by "say[ing] what they are all thinking."

Much like her brother, she often chafes against her mother's insistence that her family refrain from using their powers in an attempt to live like "normal" humans. At the same time, however, Violet and Dash are opposites in the sense that while Violet initially dislikes having superpowers, Dash, who possesses superhuman speed, is "in love" with his own abilities, thus the siblings' personalities clash quite often.

=== Powers and abilities ===
Violet is born with the superhuman abilities to render herself invisible and create force fields, the latter of which she is still attempting to master at the beginning of The Incredibles. Her superpowers mirror the personality of an awkward teenager who dislikes attention and would rather avoid being looked at, as well as her insulated, protective nature. According to The New York Times film critic A. O. Scott, Violet's powers "serve mainly as metaphors for her shyness and disconnection." Several journalists agree that Violet's abilities resemble the desires of most teenage girls. Vowell herself explained that her character's powers "reflect a female teen's occasional desires to protect herself, block out the world and avoid scrutiny or surveillance." Violet uses her powers both in battle and to hide during uncomfortable situations, such as when she encounters Tony Rydinger, a schoolmate on whom she harbors a crush. This behavior establishes the character as a social outcast. Las Vegas Weekly's Josh Bell identified Violet's invisibility as "the physical manifestation of the effects of peer pressure."

The Incredibles follows Violet as she learns to control her powers. Violet's low self-esteem manifests in the use of her superpowers to the point at which she resents having them, as demonstrated when she struggles to create a force field large enough to shield her family's jet from missiles at her mother's insistence. Kundert-Gibbs attributes Violet's ineptitude to lack of energy, which the author believes is also reflected in her straight, flat hair and slouching posture. However, Sweeney argues that Violet's inability to suddenly summon a force field of such magnitude is due to the fact that she is still unaccustomed to her powers, the use of which she had long been denied prior. After rescuing herself and her children, Helen apologizes to Violet for pressuring her to perform such a large feat, but at the same time warns Violet that they can no longer afford to doubt their abilities, assuring her daughter that she has hidden potential and "When the time comes you'll know what to do. It's in your blood." IGN identified Helen's speech as female empowering, while Vowell cited the scene as a "dramatic" moment in which Violet dons her mask and truly "becomes a hero" for the first time, elaborating that the character evolves significantly "in terms of really discovering ... and developing her powers". Violet eventually learns to embrace her abilities. According to Sweeney, Violet transforms from a shrinking violet into "Ultra-Violet" by the end of the film, while Mic's Kevin O'Keeffe wrote that Violet uses "invisibility while growing out of her own wallflower sensibility." Salon film critic Stephanie Zacharek opined that Violet slowly "discovers that, when she really tries, she can build a force-field bubble that protects her whole family". Tor.com's Mari Ness believes that Violet's gradual acceptance of her powers reinforces that "happiness comes only after people embrace the extraordinary". Vowell observed that by the sequel, Violet has consequently become skilled and confident to the point at which she starts enjoying her powers, "so as the new film starts, she wants more. She wants to use her powers. She wants to be out there." Violet ultimately grows incapable of resisting the temptation to fight crime alongside her family.

Violet can use her power of invisibility to render herself either wholly or partially invisible at will. Able to turn invisible rather quickly, the Richmond Times-Dispatch's Mike Ward joked that the character is capable of disappearing faster than the short-lived 2004 presidential campaign of politician John Kerry. Edna designs a super suit for Violet that automatically turns invisible whenever she does. Violet's force fields consist of psychic energy, as they are created using her mind. Her fields sometimes demonstrate an anti-gravitational effect on the objects they surround, and can be used to deflect heavy oncoming artillery. Typically spherical, she can use them to surround both herself and anyone she wishes to protect. Improving her abilities over the course of the films, Violet becomes skilled to the point at which she can perform significantly more feats with her fields, capable of manipulating them to create various effects. Wilkinson believes that Violet is the most talented member of her family. Hypable contributor Aaron Locke agreed that Violet "feels like the Super with the most potential", particularly in Incredibles 2. However, a particularly heavy, blunt force can potentially cause the wall of her shield to collide with her upon impact and dissipate, leaving her vulnerable to attacks. According to Ottawa Life Magazine, Violet uses her force fields more often than her invisibility, although both powers have proven useful; in the first film, she uses both powers to battle hovercraft and Syndrome's robot. Additionally, Violet has also been identified as highly intellectual.

Violet's superpowers are very similar to those of the Invisible Woman (Susan Storm-Richards), a Marvel Comics superheroine and founding member of the superhero team the Fantastic Four. Fans of the film quickly identified similarities between the two characters when the first film was released in 2004. Contributing to IGN, comic book historian Peter Sanderson identified Violet's powers as "The real giveaway of the F. F.'s influence on The Incredibles". Similar to classic Marvel superheroes, the character is under the impression that her powers make her different from most people, and considers herself to be an outsider as a result of this. According to Eric Lichtenfeld, author of Action Speaks Louder: Violence, Spectacle, and the American Action Movie, the character has also demonstrated the ability to manipulate the energy produced by her force fields, much like the comic book superheroine.

== Appearances ==
=== Films ===
Violet debuted in The Incredibles (2004) as the first-born child and only daughter of Bob and Helen Parr, a pair of retired superheroes known to the world as Mr. Incredible and Elastigirl. The character has two younger brothers: Dash and Jack-Jack. A junior high school student with the superhuman abilities to turn invisible and create force fields, Violet is shy and insecure, and would much rather be a "normal" teenager, finding it difficult to fit in among her peers. Helen resumes superhero work in search of Bob, and Violet stows away with Dash onto the jet that their mother is piloting towards Syndrome's private island. When the jet is attacked by Syndrome's missiles, Violet fails to create a force field large enough to protect its passengers at her mother's insistence; the plane is downed and the family becomes stranded on Syndrome's island. Helen leaves Violet and Dash hidden in a cave, encouraging Violet to use her powers whenever necessary. Violet and Dash are eventually pursued by Syndrome's henchmen, forcing her to use her powers to defend herself and her brother for the first time; she begins to realize her full potential while striving to master her abilities, which she had been largely suppressing prior. Violet is instrumental in helping her family escape Syndrome's lair, using a force field to interfere with the electromagnetic fields that are imprisoning them, before returning to Metroville where she teams up with her family to defeat Syndrome's robot. Once Jack-Jack is rescued from Syndrome, Violet uses a force field to protect her family from the debris falling from Syndrome's destroyed jet. At Dash's sports meet, Violet finally musters the courage to ask Tony out on a date.

Violet appears in the film's sequel Incredibles 2 (2018), in which she receives more screen time. The film follows Violet as she struggles with being a teenager and a superhero simultaneously, resuming shortly after Violet and Tony have agreed to go on their first date. Tony witnesses Violet and her family battling The Underminer, discovering that Violet is a superhero when she unknowingly removes her mask in his presence, prompting him to run away. Violet protects her family from The Underminer by creating her most powerful force field to-date. Despite limiting the destruction of the villain, superheroes remain illegal, and the Parrs remain prohibited to use their powers, which frustrates Violet. Government agent Rick Dicker erases Tony's memories of the event and inadvertently wipes Tony's memory of Violet altogether, forcing Violet to come to terms with the consequences. Violet's storyline revolves around her struggling with teenage angst, boys, dating and adolescence, while mother Helen, who has been recruited by a pair of entrepreneurs in order to repair superheroes' public image in the hopes of legalizing them again, leaves Violet and her siblings in Bob's charge, who becomes challenged with parenting Violet, attempting to make her feel better as she explores her teenage romance. Although initially resentful towards Bob for the fact that Dicker erased Tony's memories of her to the point of which she "renounces" her superhero heritage, Violet eventually offers assistance upon realizing how much effort her father is putting into raising his children. She plays an instrumental role before and during the film's climax, helping rescue her parents and Frozone, as well as coordinating a plan to steer the superyacht away from the city. At the end of the film, Violet simply re-introduces herself to Tony. Just as the characters are about to begin their first date, Violet postpones it so that she can help her family fight criminals instead, promising to rejoin him afterward.

=== Merchandise ===
Violet has made several appearances in other media, with Vowell returning to voice the character in various media tie-ins and merchandise, including toys and cell phones.

=== Video games ===
Among the video games in which Violet appears is the original 2004 video game based on the film, Violet appears mostly in stealth missions, using her invisibility to maneuver past guards and enemies unnoticed. The character's invisibility is limited by her Incredi-Meter, which can become greatly depleted by the use of her powers. In later levels, players can combine the powers of Violet and Dash to create the Incredi-Ball, in which Violet surrounds both herself and Dash using a force field, and Dash runs within it to propel it forward. The Incred-Ball has been identified as virtually indestructible. On some platforms, Violet is able to use force fields to levitate other objects. In a negative review, Alex Navarro of GameSpot described Violet's levels as arguably "the worst the game has to offer" due to time limits that restrict her invisibility, making it "difficult to gauge when a guard will or won't notice you." Similarly, Eurogamer's Patrick Garratt wrote that younger children will find playing as Violet increasingly difficult due to the character's tendency to "run out of Incredible Power juice" quickly, limiting her ability to "sneak her way to the end of the level," while Duke Ferris of Game Revolution found the character's stealth levels to be "particularly weak". The Incredibles: When Danger Calls (2004) features 10 minigames that revolve around Violet and the rest of her family, particularly using Violet's powers to avoid difficult situations. The characters are first played as their secret identifies before players unlock levels in which they can then be played as their superhuman alter egos. There are two minigames that revolve around Violet and her abilities. In the first, "Violet's Diary Drama", she projects force fields to intercept Dash and prevent him from stealing her belongings, while "Violet Surrounded" features the character using a force field to protect herself from oncoming projectiles and deflect them back at Syndrome's henchmen.

In Kinect Rush: A Disney Pixar Adventure (2012), players explore six worlds based on various Pixar films, pairing them with Violet in some of the Incredibles-themed levels to navigate around hazards and obstacles. Violet is available as an add-on figurine for Disney Infinity (2013), sharing her abilities from the film (her force fields are identified as "plasma shields" in the game). When utilized, the character becomes a player character, and can be used in Toy Box mode, The Incredibles play set and her own adventure Violet's Stealth Mission, in which the player uses Violet to retrieve as many collectibles as possible while remaining undetected by spotlights within a limited timeframe. Violet appears as a player character alongside her family in Lego The Incredibles (2018), in which her force fields can be used to intercept laser security systems. In early levels, Violet unites with Elastigirl and Dash to rescue Mr. Incredible from Syndrome; the titular family most often works together in order to overcome obstacles, such as Violet levitating over poisonous substances to assist Dash. She also has appearances in other games.

=== Comics and books ===
In 2004 Dark Horse Comics published a four-issue comics miniseries, The Incredibles, written by director Brad Bird and Paul Alden, and drawn by Ricardo Ruiz and Ramón K. Pérez. It was collected in a trade paperback published in 2005.

In early 2009 Boom! Studios published the four-issue comics miniseries The Incredibles: Family Matters by writer Mark Waid and artist Marcio Takara. Later that year, Boom! premiered a monthly ongoing series, titled simply The Incredibles, with Waid joining Landry Walker on writing duties from issues 0 - 7, after which Walker wrote the series by himself. Various artists illustrated the title during its 15-issue run, which was collected in four trade paperbacks. The series holds a rating of 8.0 out of 10 on the review aggregator website Comic Book Round Up.

In 2004, a children's book based on The Incredibles was published entitled The Incredibles: Violet's Incredible Diary, written by children's author Richard Dungworth. Described as "Violet's side of the story", the book follows the film albeit written from Violet's perspective in the form of a diary.

== Reception ==
=== Critical response ===
Violet has garnered positive reviews from film critics. The Washington Post's Jennifer Frey described Violet as "instantly familiar as the teenage girl who pines for the cute boy, fights with her little brother and is so uncertain of herself". In addition to appreciating Pixar's decision to cast the lesser-known Vowell, Joshua Tyler of CinemaBlend dubbed Violet his "favorite character" in The Incredibles, praising her many "goose-bump worthy moments as she starts to accept who she is." Commending the multidimensionality of the film's characters, Hollywood.com's Julia Emmanuele observed that, through Violet, audiences "understand how awkward and insecure being a teenager can be, even without the addition of superpowers." Vulture.com's Abraham Riesman described Vowell's voice acting as "terrific". In addition to praising Vowell's performance, Carla Meyer of the San Francisco Chronicle wrote that her character ultimately "emerges as the most sympathetic member of the family". In a retrospective review, Jonathon Dornbush of IGN cited "Violet's sense of isolation and misunderstanding" among the main reasons The Incredibles remains "a deeply relatable, enduring film" and "one of Pixar's best". Slate film critic David Edelstein acknowledged the difficulty of animating Violet's hair while calling her ability to create force fields "to die for".

Germain Lussier of io9 deemed Violet as "arguably [one of] the best parts of Incredibles 2," writing that her "journey through adolescence not only gives her a great arc, but some truly hilarious and embarrassing moments too." The Globe and Mail's Barry Hertz found Violet's design and animation particularly impressive, likening the scene in which she dries her hair to "glimpsing the future of animation, where the real and the unreal fold into each other." Patricia Puentes of CNET found Violet's role in the film to be empowering for teenage girls, praising the character's decisions to re-introduce herself to Tony and ultimately choose to fight crime over their date, concluding, "This teenage girl prefers to go catch some bad guys -- because she's a hero and that's her calling -- over having a date with the guy she likes." The Ringer editor Juliet Litman identified Violet as "a galvanizing force" in the sequel, crediting her with "propelling the plot in crucial moments and injecting raw emotion into the" otherwise comedic film. Litman also commended Vowell for recognizing "The precise balance of the serious and lighthearted[ness]" required for her role, concluding that it has become difficult to imagine Violet voiced by any other actress. Syfy Wire writer Kristy Puchko described Violet's reaction to being stood up by Tony as "all too familiar". Writing for Vulture.com, Edelstein called it "wonderful to hear Sarah Vowell and her euphonious quack as the irritable Violet," describing the character as "the quintessential brilliant but ever-stricken and angry teenage girl." The New Yorker's Anthony Lane wrote that Vowell "still provides the pitch and yaw of adolescent speech—now tetchy, now timid, but touched here and there with a determination that might just save the day."

Some critics complained that the character was underused in the sequel. CNET contributor Mike Sorrentino wrote that the film's emphasis on Helen and Bob results in Violet being "relegated to the sidelines for most of the film", while Screen Daily's Tim Grierson wrote that the character's "awkward dating woes all streak by too quickly." For Screen Rant, Molly Freeman observed that the character's arc "largely exist[s] to serve Bob's own storyline". Writing that while Violet's storyline offered "a great deal of potential" by "exploring how a child with superpowers growing up in a world where superheroes are illegal could affect her sense of self", Freeman criticized it for being "boiled down to either focusing on her dating life or providing a challenge for Bob to overcome." However, the critic acknowledged that Violet is provided with several opportunities "to demonstrate [her] visually compelling superpowers."

=== Accolades ===
Vowell's performance and character have proven to be particularly popular among young women and teenage girls, from whom she continues to receive positive feedback. Cosmic Book News crowned Violet "the teen-queen of sarcasm", while Michelle Lima of Oh My Disney wrote that the character boasts "some seriously amazing sarcasm skills." Ana Luisa Suarez of Hollywood.com considers Violet's sarcasm to be among "15 Reasons Why 'The Incredibles' Is The Best Superhero Movie". Rolling Stone ranked Violet the 20th "Best Pixar Movie Character", ahead of Mr. Incredible (24th), with author Alissa Wilkinson calling her "super-smart ... which makes the moment when she finally transforms into a confident superheroine ... that much more delightful." Hypable ranked Violet the third best Incredibles 2 superhero, with author Aaron Locke writing, "It would be great to see Violet take on an investigation of her own."

Pajiba ranked Violet Pixar's ninth best female character. IndieWire ranked Vowell's work as Violet Pixar's 19th greatest performance, writing that her "quirky tones perfectly captures the kind of girl who wishes she could (and in this case actually can) fade into the background," continuing, "the way she eventually finds her own voice is one of the most moving aspects of the film." Similarly, The Playlist also ranked Vowell's performance 19th. The Cinemaholic ranked The Incredibles the third best film featuring invisible characters, with author Clarisse Tenreiro writing that Violet "possesses perhaps the coolest power of" the film's characters. In 2017, Violet served as inspiration behind the BBC article "Can a 'superpower force field' protect us from hackers?", in which technology writer Matthew Wall likened cybersecurity firm Bromium anti-malware software to the character's abilities several times.
