= Huck Milner =

American actor (born 2007)

- Born: Huckleberry Milner; August 14, 2007 (age 19); New York City, New York
- Occupation: Actor
- Years active: 2017–present

Huckleberry Milner (born August 14, 2007) is an American actor. He is best known for being the voice of Dash Parr in the Pixar animated film Incredibles 2.

== Early life and career ==
Milner was born in New York City and has two older sisters. Before his career started Milner had been in several musicals and plays through a New York children’s acting academy.

His first appearance in a film came in 2018's Incredibles 2, the sequel to 2004's The Incredibles. He plays Dash, taking the role from Spencer Fox who at the time was in his 20s and too old to return. Milner also voiced Dash in the video games Lego The Incredibles. Milner will reprise his role in the upcoming film Incredibles 3.

== Music career ==
Huck's love of music started early, going to Wilco concerts since the age of 2, and more recently seeing his favorite band The Backseat Lovers. He started learning guitar during his teen years, releasing his first album "374" in 2025 at age 17. As of August 2026, Huck has released his most popular song, "Ups and Downs", taking a different direction than his previous album.

During his freshman year of college, Huck started a band with three other students at Bucknell called The Pocket. They've had multiple performances at the college, and are heard as the instrumentals in "Ups and Downs".

== Filmography ==
=== Film ===
Year	Title	Role	Notes
2018	Incredibles 2	Dash Parr	Voice
2028	Incredibles 3	Dash Parr	Voice; In production

=== Television ===
Year	Title	Role	Notes
2017	Saturday Night Live	Surprised Kid	Television series; Episode: "Kevin Hart/Foo Fighters"
2019	Sesame Street	Mr. Noodle Kid	Episode: "Big Bird Across America"
2021	Pixar Popcorn	Dash Parr	Episode: "Chore Day - The Incredibles Way"; voice

=== Video games ===
Year	Title	Role	Notes
2018	Lego The Incredibles	Dash Parr	Voice

=== Podcasts ===
Year	Title	Role	Notes
2020	Heads Will Roll	Lothar the Goon, Jr.	10 episodes; voice
