= Incredibles 2 =

2018 film by Brad Bird

- Theatrical release poster
- Directed by: Brad Bird
- Written by: Brad Bird
- Produced by: John Walker; Nicole Paradis Grindle
- Starring: Craig T. Nelson; Holly Hunter; Sarah Vowell; Huck Milner; Samuel L. Jackson; Bob Odenkirk; Catherine Keener; Jonathan Banks
- Cinematography: Mahyar Abousaeedi (camera); Erik Smitt (lighting)
- Edited by: Stephen Schaffer
- Music by: Michael Giacchino
- Production company: Pixar Animation Studios
- Distributed by: Walt Disney Studios; Motion Pictures (Note: Distributed under the Walt Disney Pictures banner.)
- Release dates: June 5, 2018 (Los Angeles); June 15, 2018 (United States)
- Running time: 118 minutes
- Country: United States
- Language: English
- Budget: $200 million
- Box office: $1.243 billion

Incredibles 2 is a 2018 American animated superhero film written and directed by Brad Bird. Produced by Pixar Animation Studios for Walt Disney Pictures, it is the second film in The Incredibles franchise, and a sequel to the 2004 film. Craig T. Nelson, Holly Hunter, Sarah Vowell, and Samuel L. Jackson reprise their roles from the first film, with Huck Milner, Bob Odenkirk, Catherine Keener, and Jonathan Banks joining the cast. The film follows the Incredibles as they try to restore the public's trust in superheroes while balancing family life.

Following the success of The Incredibles, Bird postponed development on a sequel to work on other films. He attempted to distinguish the script from other superhero films and television series released since the first film, focusing on the family dynamic rather than the superhero genre.

Incredibles 2 premiered in Los Angeles on June 5, 2018, and was theatrically released in the United States on June 15, 2018. It received positive reviews from critics, with praise for its animation, humor, voice acting, action sequences, writing, and musical score. The film grossed over $1.2 billion worldwide, making it the fourth-highest-grossing film of 2018, and during its theatrical run it was the second-highest-grossing animated film, and the 15th-highest-grossing film of all time. It also became the highest-grossing animated film in the United States and Canada, as well as the highest-grossing Pixar film until Inside Out 2 (2024).

The film was named by the National Board of Review as the Best Animated Film of 2018, and was nominated for Best Animated Feature Film at the 76th Golden Globe Awards and 91st Academy Awards, but lost both to Spider-Man: Into the Spider-Verse. It was also the winner of the 2019 Kids' Choice Award for Favorite Animated Movie. A sequel, Incredibles 3, is scheduled to be released on June 16, 2028.

== Plot ==
Following Syndrome’s death, The Parrs (The Incredibles) and Lucius Best (Frozone) battle The Underminer in Municiberg. (Note: As depicted in the ending of The Incredibles (2004)) The superheroes prevent the villain from destroying city hall, but fail to stop him from robbing a bank and making his escape. The resulting massive property damage prompts the government to shut down the Superhero Relocation Program, ending financial assistance for the "supers". Violet's classmate and love interest, Tony Rydinger, discovers her superhero identity; Agent Rick Dicker accidentally erases Tony's entire knowledge of Violet instead of just this incident.

Wealthy siblings Winston and Evelyn Deavor, who run the telecommunications company DevTech, propose secret missions to Bob, Helen, and Lucius, which are to be recorded and broadcast in a movement to regain public trust in superheroes. Winston chooses Helen for their initial missions as she has caused the least property damage. Initially reluctant to be away from her family and risking getting into trouble with the law, Helen accepts after a talk with Bob. Meanwhile, Winston rehouses the Parrs in a luxury mansion.

Bob struggles in his new role as a stay-at-home parent, left to deal with Violet's dejection over Tony forgetting their first date, Dash's math homework, and the chaos of baby Jack-Jack's burgeoning superpowers. He suppresses envy for Helen and, at Lucius's advice, calls on Edna Mode to babysit Jack-Jack. Meanwhile, in the city of New Urbem, Helen encounters the supervillain Screenslaver, a hacker who can perform hypnosis through any screen. After preventing him from destroying a crowded hovertrain and thwarting his assassination attempt on an ambassador, she tracks his signals and infiltrates his base. Defeating him, she unmasks him only to discover a disoriented pizza delivery driver. At a party celebrating Helen's success, Winston announces a summit of world leaders to legalize the supers on live television, hosted aboard his luxury hydrofoil yacht, the Everjust, and attended by all "supers" coming out of hiding.

Helen realizes the Screenslaver lured her to a decoy double, and the pizza delivery driver was under the control of hypnotic goggles. Evelyn reveals herself to be the true Screenslaver and hypnotizes Helen, restraining her using her goggles and a freezing cell that negates her self-stretching superpower. Evelyn blames society's overdependence on the "supers" for the deaths of her and Winston's parents, as their father was shot by burglars after the newly outlawed supers Fironic and Gazerbeam did not answer his calls for aid, and their mother died of grief. Evelyn plans to sabotage her brother's summit to ruin the reputation of all "supers" once more and keep them outlawed in the hopes that the public will be safer with self-sufficient crimefighting.

Evelyn lures Bob into a trap on the Everjust, goggling him too, and sends six hypnotized supers to subdue Violet and Dash. Lucius arrives to protect them but is overwhelmed and goggled as well. Violet, Dash and Jack-Jack escape in the Incredibile, the supercar once owned by Bob, and, deducing their parents are in danger, stow away on the Everjust. Onboard, Helen, Bob, and Lucius are forced to broadcast themselves giving villainous speeches, subduing the ship's crew, and locking its course towards Municiberg at a disastrous pace. When the children arrive, Jack-Jack removes the goggles on Helen, who in turn frees Bob and Lucius. They work together to release the other mind-controlled supers and safely prevent the Everjust's collision with the city. Evelyn tries to escape in the yacht's parasite jet, but is then caught by Helen and arrested.

With another disaster averted and the positive publicity surrounding this, supers around the world regain their legal status. Sometime later, Tony is picked up by Violet and her family in the Incredibile for their reinstated movie date. They spot a police chase; Violet leaves Tony at the movie theater, promising a quick return, before the Parrs don their superhero masks and join the pursuit.

== Voice cast ==
- Craig T. Nelson as Bob Parr / Mr. Incredible, the father of the family who possesses superhuman strength, endurance and limited invulnerability.
- Holly Hunter as Helen Parr / Elastigirl, the mother of the family who has the ability to stretch her body into many shapes and forms.
- Sarah Vowell as Violet Parr, the family's oldest child and only daughter, who can become invisible and project force fields.
- Huck Milner as Dashiell "Dash" Parr, the family's middle child and oldest son, who has superhuman speed. He replaces Spencer Fox, who previously voiced the character in the first film.
- Eli Fucile as Jack-Jack Parr, the youngest child of Bob and Helen who develops an assortment of powers.
  - Nick Bird provides the vocal effects for Jack-Jack's monster form.
- Bob Odenkirk as Winston Deavor, a superhero fan who leads a giant telecommunications company called DevTech with his sister Evelyn, and wants to bring back superheroes by revamping their public image.
- Samuel L. Jackson as Lucius Best / Frozone, Bob's best friend, who has the ability to form ice from humidity.
- Catherine Keener as Evelyn Deavor / Screenslaver, Winston's sister, a technological genius who has never encountered a problem she could not solve. She is later revealed to be a villain who hijacks screens and uses them to brainwash other people.
  - Bill Wise voices Evelyn while wearing the Screenslaver mask, as well as a pizza delivery driver hypnotized by Evelyn to pose as her decoy double.
- Brad Bird as Edna "E" Mode, a fashion designer for superheroes and a close friend of the Parrs.
- Jonathan Banks as Rick Dicker, a government agent responsible for helping the Parrs stay undercover and unremarkable. When his department is shut down, the Parrs are left to their own devices. Banks replaces Bud Luckey from the first film, who died in 2018 with the film being dedicated to his memory.
- Michael Bird as Tony Rydinger, Violet's love interest and later boyfriend.
- Sophia Bush as Karen / Voyd, an aspiring superhero with the power to create portals.
- Phil LaMarr as:
  - Krushauer, an aspiring superhero with the power to telekinetically crush objects.
  - He-Lectrix, an aspiring superhero with the power to control electricity.
- Paul Eiding as Gus Burns / Reflux, an elderly aspiring superhero who can vomit hot lava.
- Isabella Rossellini as Ambassador Henrietta Selick, a foreign official committed to the support and legalization of superheroes. Rossellini reprised her role in the Italian dubbing of the movie. The character is named for director Henry Selick.
- John Ratzenberger as the Underminer, a mole-like supervillain who seeks to bring war and destruction to the world.
- Barry Bostwick as the Mayor of New Urbem
- Jere Burns as Detective No. 1
- Adam Rodriguez as Detective No. 2
- Kimberly Adair Clark as Honey Best, Frozone's wife.
- Adam Gates as Chad Brentley, a news reporter.
- Usher as the unnamed limo driver who is a big fan of Frozone.

== Production ==
=== Development ===
While publicizing The Incredibles (2004), Brad Bird had already conceptualized the eventual approach of a sequel where Bob and Helen Parr would switch roles and Jack-Jack would develop multiple powers unknown to the family. Following The Incredibles, Bird directed Ratatouille (2007), his next film for Pixar. Near its premiere in June 2007, Bird said he was open to an idea of a sequel to The Incredibles, but only if it could be better than the original. He stated, "I have pieces that I think are good, but I don't have them all together." In a May 2013 interview, Bird reiterated his interest in a sequel: "I have been thinking about it. People think that I have not been, but I have—because I love those characters, and love that world ... I have many, many elements that I think would work really well in another Incredibles film, and if I can get 'em to click all together, I would probably wanna do that."

At the Disney shareholder meeting in March 2014, Disney CEO and chairman Bob Iger confirmed that Pixar was working on an Incredibles sequel, and that Bird would return as both director and screenwriter. Bird started the script around April 2015, and said that the Incredibles sequel would be his next film after Tomorrowland (2015).

=== Writing ===
One challenge in writing Incredibles 2 was how to deal with the large number of superhero films and television series that had been released since the first film, such as the Marvel Cinematic Universe (MCU). To try to differentiate the sequel, Bird wanted to avoid tropes related to the superhero genre: "I don't think that kind of idea stays interesting for very long. For me, the interesting thing was never the superhero part of it. It was more the family dynamic, and how do superhero things play into that." He said he wanted to include some unused ideas from the first film, and that the new story would focus on Helen Parr / Elastigirl.

Though the sequel was released thirteen-and-a-half years after the first, Bird did not want to use a narrative element like an ellipsis or to come up with new characters, and instead continued from where the first film left off. This allowed him to keep characters with the same superpowers and not have to develop new ones, nor did he need to figure out how to deal with Violet and Dash being adults. This also allowed him to keep Jack-Jack as an infant with an array of powers, which Bird likened to how infants are able to understand numerous languages. While the plot of the 2005 follow-up video game to The Incredibles, The Incredibles: Rise of the Underminer, begins at that same point of time, the film discards the game's continuity. The film was produced with a production budget of $200 million.

=== Casting ===
In November 2016, Pixar announced that Holly Hunter and Samuel L. Jackson would reprise their roles. During the 2017 D23 Expo, it was confirmed that Craig T. Nelson and Sarah Vowell would also reprise their roles, and that Spencer Fox, the original voice of Dashiell "Dash" Parr, would be replaced by younger newcomer Huckleberry Milner. Later that month, Bird and John Ratzenberger were, also, confirmed as reprising their characters from the first film.

In November 2017, Pixar announced that Bob Odenkirk and Catherine Keener had joined the cast. In January 2018, it was announced that Sophia Bush and Isabella Rossellini would voice new characters Voyd and The Ambassador, while Jonathan Banks would voice Rick Dicker after the character's original voice actor Bud Luckey retired in 2014; after his death in 2018, the film was dedicated to Luckey's memory.

=== Animation ===
One advantage that Pixar had with Incredibles 2 was the advancement of technology the company had seen since the original film and a team of much more experienced animators. Producer John Walker said, "I think that one of the things that excited Brad and Ralph Eggleston, the production designer, was that the technology existed now to finally realize the designs in the way that they had hoped to realize them in 2004. There were no notions of, 'Well, we don't know how to do long hair, we don't know how to do humans, we don't know how to do muscles.' Everybody knows how to do it. It's just now about doing it quickly." Because Pixar no longer used the same systems from the first film, all the characters had to be created from scratch on the computer again. The studio also used physically based human eye models for the characters for the first time, which made the eyes larger and more stylized than those of real humans.

=== Music ===
In 2015, Bird confirmed that Michael Giacchino would return to compose the score. Giacchino began work around May 2017. The soundtrack album was released on June 15, 2018 and on CD two weeks later. In addition to the film's score, it includes the vocalized theme songs for Mr. Incredible, Frozone, and Elastigirl heard in the credits, as well as bonus versions of the songs sung by Disney's a cappella group, DCappella, and the latter's version of the track "The Glory Days" from the first film.

== Marketing ==
=== Promotion ===
A 53-second teaser trailer premiered on November 18, 2017 during ESPN's broadcast of College GameDay. It received 113.0 million views in its first 24 hours, becoming the most-viewed trailer for an animated film up until the release of the teaser trailer for Frozen II in February 2019, which surpassed it with 116.4 million views in its first 24 hours. It is also the 14th-most-viewed trailer overall. The studio spent a total of $150 million promoting the film. In the month of the release of the film, Elastigirl's new costume in Incredibles 2 was added in the video game Disney Magic Kingdoms, along with a limited time Event to unlock Jack-Jack.

=== Merchandise ===
An Incredibles 2 graphic novel and comic miniseries was published by Dark Horse Comics in 2018. The graphic novel, titled Incredibles 2: Heroes at Home, was written by Liz Marsham and illustrated by Nicoletta Baldari. A comic miniseries, titled Incredibles 2: Crisis in Mid-Life! & Other Stories, was written by Christos Gage and Landry Walker, and illustrated by Gurihiru, J. Bone, Andrea Greppi and Roberta Zanotta. Christos Gage also wrote (with Jean Claudio-Vinci as illustrator) another series titled Incredibles 2: Secret Identities. The series, like his Crisis in Mid-Life! & Other Stories, focuses on what happens after the film. This particular series is about Violet, published in a single graphic novel by Dark Horse Comics on October 1, 2019.

In May 2018, a prose novel was released entitled Incredibles 2: A Real Stretch: An Elastigirl Prequel Story, which focuses on the life of the character Elastigirl before the events of the first film.

A Lego video game adaptation of both films was released on the same day as Incredibles 2.

Funko released several Pop! figures including a chase (1/6) variant of Violet in her invisible form, and several retail exclusives to Target and Hot Topic. There was a Jack-Jack as Edna Mode Pop! figure that released exclusively at San Diego Comic-Con in July 2018. In addition, Funko released several blind box mystery minis of characters from the film.

Figpin released a boxed set of 5 characters (Edna "E" Mode, Mr. Incredible, Elastigirl, Dash, and Violet) limited to 1000 pieces, which was released exclusively at the D23 Expo in August 2019. Numerous attendees camped out overnight to purchase the box set at the Figpin booth, which sold out quickly.

== Release ==
=== Theatrical ===
The official premiere of Incredibles 2 took place in Los Angeles on June 5, 2018. It was theatrically released in the United States on June 15, 2018. It was accompanied by Pixar's short film Bao. The film's release was originally scheduled for June 21, 2019, but the date was moved forward to 2018 as it was ahead of schedule, and Pixar handed the 2019 release date over to Toy Story 4.

=== Home media ===
Incredibles 2 was released digitally on October 23, 2018, and on DVD, Blu-ray, and Ultra HD Blu-ray on November 6, 2018. The film made a revenue of $66.7 million from home video sales with 3.4 million units sold, making it the sixth best-selling title of 2018.

== Reception ==
=== Box office ===
Incredibles 2 grossed $608.6 million in the United States and Canada, and $634.2 million in other territories, for a total worldwide gross of $1.242 billion.

On July 1, 2018, the film passed $648 million at the worldwide box office, surpassing the $633 million the original film made in its entire theatrical run. It ended its run as the ninth-highest-grossing film of all time domestically and the highest-grossing animated film domestically. The film crossed the $1 billion mark on July 30, 2018, becoming the seventh animated film and the 36th film of all time to reach the milestone. It was also the fifth animated Disney film, the third Pixar film, and Disney's 18th film overall to gross $1 billion worldwide, as well as the fastest animated film to gross $1 billion, doing so in 46 days, surpassing Minions (49 days), but later being surpassed by The Lion King in 2019 (21 days), also made by Disney, and The Super Mario Bros. Movie (25 days) in 2023. On August 12, the film surpassed Toy Story 3 ($1.067 billion) to become the highest-grossing Pixar film worldwide, and held this record until being surpassed by Inside Out 2 in 2024. Deadline Hollywood calculated the net profit of the film to be $447.4 million, when factoring together all expenses and revenues, making it the third-most-profitable release of 2018.

==== United States and Canada ====
In April 2018, early box office projections had Incredibles 2 grossing $110 million in its opening weekend in the United States and Canada. In May 2018, a month before the film's release, tracking revised to an opening weekend of $140 million or more. A week prior to the film's opening, Fandango reported that pre-sale of tickets for the film had exceeded that of previous mid-year blockbusters Finding Dory, Wonder Woman, Spider-Man: Homecoming and Suicide Squad at the same point in their release cycles. By the week of its release, opening weekend projections had reached upwards of $150 million. A day before release, it became Fandango's top pre-selling animated film of all time, outselling the previous record-holder, Finding Dory.

The film grossed $18.5 million from Thursday night previews, increasing weekend projections to as high as $174 million. The previews set the record for an animated film, doubling Finding Dory's $9.2 million, and were higher than the likes of fellow superhero films Spider-Man: Homecoming, Thor: Ragnarok and Justice League. It made $71.6 million on its first day, including previews, the best ever for an animated film (besting Dory's $54.7 million by 31%) and 14th-highest all time. It went on to debut to $182.7 million, the eighth-best opening of all time, far ahead of Finding Dory's animated record of $135.1 million and more than the entire lifetime gross of Pixar's A Bug's Life ($162.8 million), Cars 3 ($152.9 million), and The Good Dinosaur ($123.1 million).

The film set animated records for its Monday and Tuesday grosses, making $23.9 million (beating the $23.4 million made by Shrek 2 in May 2004) and $27.1 million (beating Finding Dory's $23.1 million), respectively. Its Tuesday gross also set a June record, topping Jurassic World ($24.3 million in 2015). By Thursday, its seventh day of release, the film had grossed $269.4 million, topping the entire lifetime domestic gross of the original, not accounting for inflation ($261.4 million). In its second weekend the film dropped 56% to $80.9 million, finishing second behind newcomer Jurassic World: Fallen Kingdom ($148 million), marking the first time two films opened to over $100 million in back-to-back weekends. It remained in second place in its third weekend, grossing $45.5 million and third in its fourth weekend with $29 million, respectively. On July 7, its 23rd day of release, the film crossed $495 million, passing Finding Dory to become the highest-grossing animated film and Pixar's highest-grossing film of all time domestically, and the following day became the first animated film to gross over $500 million domestically. On September 2, its 80th day of release, it became the first animated film to gross over $600 million domestically. Incredibles 2 ended its run at the box office as the third highest-grossing film of 2018 behind Black Panther and Avengers: Infinity War.

==== Internationally ====
Outside the United States, the film made $51.5 million from 25 countries in its opening weekend, for a global debut of $231.5 million. This made it the biggest international opening weekend for an animated film, surpassing Ice Age: Dawn of the Dinosaurs. Mexico was the largest debut with $12.3 million, followed by Australia ($7.7 million) and Russia ($5.4 million). In its second weekend of release the film made $58.6 million from 28 countries, bringing its two-week total to $134.7 million. Its largest market was China where it made $21.2 million, the best-ever opening for a Pixar film in the country. It was also released in India where it made $3.3 million. In the United Kingdom, the film grossed $12.6 million in its opening weekend, the second-biggest opening for Pixar after Toy Story 3. As of November 18, 2018, The biggest markets in terms of total earnings are the United Kingdom ($73.1 million), followed by China ($51.5 million), Japan ($43.9 million), France ($41.7 million), and Brazil ($37.6 million).

=== Critical response ===
Incredibles 2 received positive reviews from critics, who praised its character arcs, themes, and action sequences. On review aggregator Rotten Tomatoes, the film holds an approval rating of 93% based on 385 reviews, with an average rating of 7.9/10. The website's critical consensus reads: "Incredibles 2 reunites Pixar's family crimefighting team for a long-awaited follow-up that may not quite live up to the original, but comes close enough to earn its name." On Metacritic, which assigns a normalized rating to reviews, the film has a weighted average score of 80 out of 100, based on 51 critics, indicating "generally favorable" reviews. Audiences polled by CinemaScore gave the film a rare grade of "A+" on an A+ to F scale, the same score as the first film. Those at PostTrak gave the film a 93% overall positive score and an 83% "definite recommend". Jack Shepherd of The Independent reported that Incredibles 2 received more positive reviews than most of Pixar’s previous sequels, which had generally garnered mixed reception, namely Cars 2 (2011), Monsters University (2013), Finding Dory (2016), and Cars 3 (2017).

Robert Abele of TheWrap, praised the film, saying: "Whatever the opposite of phoning in a sequel is, that's Brad Bird's progressive-minded, thunderously fun mix of super saves, throwback aesthetics and family comedy." A.A. Dowd, writing for The A.V. Club, felt it was "A sparkling contraption of an animated comedy, funny and often wondrous in its midcentury-modern vision of an alternate America frozen in the amber of a bygone idealism." David Ehrlich of IndieWire, gave the film a "B+", saying: "When the Parrs are pushed out of their comfort zone, Bird settles into his... [after] inciting a Spielberg-level monorail chase that reaffirms Bird's lucid gift for kinetic and character-driven action filmmaking, the movie blasts off and never looks back." Stephanie Zacharek from Time considered it "bold [and] rapturously entertaining," while David Sims at The Atlantic, dubbed it "dazzling, thought-provoking, and sometimes overwhelming in terms of plotting." Peter Travers of Rolling Stone gave the film a 3.5 out of 4 stars, and said: "Long-awaited follow-up brings back everyone's favorite superhero family—and suggests that we should give our caped-crusader pop obsessions a rest." Manohla Dargis of The New York Times, wrote a positive review of the film, saying: "The family that fights together remains the steadily throbbing, unbreakable heart of Incredibles 2, even when Bob and Helen swap traditional roles. There's something too self-conscious—overcompensating much?"

The Hollywood Reporter reported that even critics who were more reserved in their praise agreed that Incredibles 2 was on par with recent superhero films and "one of the best sequels in recent memory". Meanwhile, some critics were divided on whether or not the sequel surpasses or matches the original. Variety's Owen Gleiberman called the film "fun but far from incredible" and wrote: "It's true that the Toy Story films, all three of which are fantastic, did variations on the same theme of a toy's obsolescence, but as movies they kept the emotions close to the surface. In Incredibles 2, we never get that rush of feeling." Mark Kermode, writing for The Guardian, gave the film four out of five stars, and said: "Slapstick genius, profound social comment and a monstrously funny infant combine to conjure a magical second outing for the superhero family." John Nugent of Empire magazine also gave the film four out of five stars, saying: "There's some quibbles to be had in an over-familiar setup, and an under-served villain, but overall this is a gloriously fun family parable, and as entertaining as any superhero movie you'll see this year." Brian Tellerico of Rogerebert.com gave the film 3.5 out of 4 stars, and said: "...Incredibles 2 understands something that most family sequels, even the Pixar ones, fail to comprehend—we don't just want to repeat something we loved before. We want to love it all over again. You will with Incredibles 2." Michael Phillips of the Chicago Tribune gave the film 2.5 out of 4 stars, and said: "Incredibles 2 is content to punch the clock and stick to straight, bombastic action mode. In that mode, composer Giacchino's music is the most successful element, running nimble, beautifully orchestrated variations on themes that feel familiar in the best ways while retaining their spark. The animation is bright and visually dynamic. The script, well ... if the title were Satisfactories 2, it'd be about right." Ty Burr for The Boston Globe called it a "clattery, unfocused affair that at times is more irritating than fun." Todd McCarthy of The Hollywood Reporter gave the film a positive review, saying: "Boosted by central characters that remain vastly engaging and a deep supply of wit, Incredibles 2 certainly proves worth the wait, even if it hits the target but not the bull's-eye in quite the way the first one did."

Conversely, Ryan Gilbey of the New Statesman gave Incredibles 2 a negative review, arguing that it falls short of the original and that its "lack of inspiration" ultimately taints the sequel. Eleanor Ringel of Saportareport praised the "breathtaking" animation and Jack-Jack's "seemingly limitless powers" and that "Bird's wit can be wicked", she regarded the film overall as a disappointment compared to the original.

=== Health hazards and epilepsy problems ===
Disability advocates have warned that the Screenslaver's hypnotic screens (shown here) may trigger epileptic seizures.

Many disability advocates, including the Epilepsy Foundation, have raised concerns that movie scenes with flashing lights, including that in Incredibles 2 of Elastigirl's fight with the Screenslaver, can trigger seizures in viewers affected by photosensitive epilepsy. As a result, several theaters posted warnings for audiences. Disney told USA Today that it appreciated those efforts, and then, in a memo, asked all theaters exhibiting the movie to warn audiences: "Incredibles 2 contains a sequence of flashing lights, which may affect customers who are susceptible to photosensitive epilepsy or other photosensitivities." A re-edited version was released in the United Kingdom with all affected sequences altered so that any flashing lights and strobe effects now pass the Harding test.

=== Accolades ===
Award	Date of ceremony	Category	Recipient(s)	Result	Ref.
Academy Awards	February 24, 2019	Best Animated Feature	Brad Bird, John Walker and Nicole Paradis Grindle	Nominated	
Alliance of Women Film Journalists	January 10, 2019	Best Animated Feature Film	Brad Bird	Nominated	
Alliance of Women Film Journalists	January 10, 2019	Best Animated Female	Holly Hunter as Elastigirl	Won	
Annie Awards	February 2, 2019	Annie Award for Best Animated Feature	Brad Bird, John Walker and Nicole Paradis Grindle	Nominated	
Annie Awards	February 2, 2019	Outstanding Achievement for Animated Effects in an Animated Feature Production	Greg Gladstone, Tolga Göktekin, Jason Johnston, Eric Lacroix and Krzysztof Rost	Nominated	
Annie Awards	February 2, 2019	Outstanding Achievement for Character Animation in an Animated Feature Production	Lance Fite	Nominated	
Annie Awards	February 2, 2019	Outstanding Achievement for Character Design in an Animated Feature Production	Matt Notle	Nominated	
Annie Awards	February 2, 2019	Annie Award for Directing in a Feature Production	Brad Bird	Nominated	
Annie Awards	February 2, 2019	Annie Award for Music in a Feature Production	Michael Giacchino	Won	
Annie Awards	February 2, 2019	Outstanding Achievement for Storyboarding in an Animated Feature Production	Dean Kelly	Won	
Annie Awards	February 2, 2019	Outstanding Achievement for Storyboarding in an Animated Feature Production	Bobby Alcid Rubio	Nominated	
Annie Awards	February 2, 2019	Annie Award for Voice Acting in a Feature Production	Holly Hunter	Nominated	
Annie Awards	February 2, 2019	Annie Award for Writing in a Feature Production	Brad Bird	Nominated	
Annie Awards	February 2, 2019	Outstanding Achievement for Editorial in an Animated Feature Production	Stephen Schaffer, Anthony J. Greenberg and Katie Schaefer Bishop	Nominated	
British Academy Children's Awards	November 25, 2018	Feature Film	Brad Bird, John Walker and Nicole Paradis Grindle	Nominated	
British Academy Film Awards	February 10, 2019	Best Animated Film	Brad Bird, John Walker and Nicole Paradis Grindle	Nominated	
Chicago Film Critics Association Awards	December 7, 2018	Best Animated Feature	Brad Bird	Nominated	
Critics' Choice Movie Awards	January 13, 2019	Best Animated Feature	Brad Bird	Nominated	
Golden Globe Awards	January 6, 2019	Best Animated Feature Film	Incredibles 2	Nominated	
Hollywood Music in Media Awards	November 14, 2018	Original Score – Animated Film	Michael Giacchino	Nominated	
Humanitas Prize	February 8, 2019	Family Feature Film	Brad Bird	Nominated	
Kids' Choice Awards	March 23, 2019	Favorite Animated Movie	Incredibles 2	Won	
Los Angeles Film Critics Association	December 9, 2018	Best Animated Feature	Incredibles 2	2nd place	
National Board of Review	November 27, 2018	Best Animated Film	Brad Bird	Won	
New York Film Critics Circle Awards	November 29, 2018	Best Animated Feature	Incredibles 2	Nominated	
San Diego Film Critics Society	December 10, 2018	Best Animated Feature	Incredibles 2	Nominated	
San Francisco Film Critics Circle	December 9, 2018	Best Animated Feature	Incredibles 2	Nominated	
Seattle Film Critics Society	December 17, 2018	Best Animated Feature	Brad Bird	Nominated	
St. Louis Film Critics Association	December 16, 2018	Best Animated Feature	Incredibles 2	Nominated	
People's Choice Awards	November 11, 2018	Favorite Family Movie	Incredibles 2	Won	
People's Choice Awards	November 11, 2018	Movie of 2018	Incredibles 2	Nominated	
Satellite Awards	February 22, 2019	Best Animated or Mixed Media Film	Brad Bird	Nominated	
Saturn Awards	September 13, 2019	Best Animated Film	Incredibles 2	Nominated	
Teen Choice Awards	August 12, 2018	Choice Summer Movie	Incredibles 2	Won	
Visual Effects Society Awards	February 5, 2019	Outstanding Visual Effects in an Animated Feature	Brad Bird, John Walker, Rick Sayre, Bill Watral	Nominated	
Visual Effects Society Awards	February 5, 2019	Outstanding Animated Character in an Animated Feature	Michal Makarewicz, Ben Porter, Edgar Rodriguez, Kevin Singleton for Helen Parr	Nominated	
Visual Effects Society Awards	February 5, 2019	Outstanding Created Environment in an Animated Feature	Christopher M. Burrows, Philip Metschan, Michael Rutter, Joshua West for The Parr House	Nominated	
Visual Effects Society Awards	February 5, 2019	Outstanding Model in a Photoreal or Animated Project	Neil Blevins, Philip Metschan, Kevin Singleton for Underminer Vehicle	Nominated	
Visual Effects Society Awards	February 5, 2019	Outstanding Effects Simulations in an Animated Feature	Paul Kanyuk, Tiffany Erickson Klohn, Vincent Serritella, Matthew Kiyoshi Wong	Nominated	
Washington D.C. Area Film Critics Association Awards	December 3, 2018	Best Animated Feature	Brad Bird	Nominated	
Washington D.C. Area Film Critics Association Awards	December 3, 2018	Best Animated Voice Performance	Holly Hunter	Nominated	

== Sequel ==
Following the release of Incredibles 2, director Brad Bird acknowledged that the film's truncated production schedule resulted in many plotlines and ideas he had for the film being cut from the final version. He cited Pixar's decision in October 2016 to swap the release dates of Toy Story 4 and Incredibles 2, which meant that Bird's film lost a full year of production. Bird stated that the lingering plotlines could lead to a third installment, just as the plotlines of the first did with the second. "There were a lot of ideas that we had on this film that could be [used]... whether it's another Incredibles film, or something else." Cast members including Samuel L. Jackson and Sophia Bush have expressed interest in reprising their roles for the third film with Bush herself expressing the desires of a team up with Sarah Vowell's Violet for the third film. Producer John Walker would not "rule [a third film] out".

In May 2024 (in the lead-up to the first film's 20th anniversary), an interview with Pixar CCO Pete Docter and Pixar president Jim Morris revealed that the studio was considering making more sequels to their popular franchises, among them being The Incredibles. Incredibles 3 was officially announced by Docter at the D23 Expo event in August 2024, with Bird returning to develop. In June 2025, it was announced that Peter Sohn would direct the film due to Bird's commitment to the film Ray Gunn (2026). However, Bird would remain involved as a screenwriter and executive producer while Dana Murray would produce.

On August 30, 2025, at Destination D23 2025, it was revealed that Incredibles 3 was scheduled to release around 2028. On March 18, 2026, it was announced during a shareholders meeting that the film was scheduled for release on June 16, 2028.
