= Disney Infinity (video game) =

2013 video game

- Cover art
- Developers: Avalanche Software; Heavy Iron Studios (Wii, Wii U, Windows, iOS); Altron (3DS)
- Publishers: WW: Disney Interactive Studios; JP: Namco Bandai Games; (Note: Released under the Namco brand name.)
- Composer: Chuck E. Myers
- Series: Disney Infinity
- Platforms: Nintendo 3DS, PlayStation 3, Wii, Wii U, Xbox 360, Microsoft Windows, iOS
- Release: Nintendo 3DS, PlayStation 3, Wii, Wii U, Xbox 360: NA: August 18, 2013; EU: August 23, 2013; JP: November 28, 2013; (Wii U, 3DS); Microsoft Windows: WW: November 14, 2013; iOS: EU/NA: September 18, 2013
- Genre: Action-adventure
- Modes: Single-player, multiplayer

Disney Infinity is a 2013 toys-to-life action-adventure game developed by Avalanche Software and published by Disney Interactive Studios for the Xbox 360, PlayStation 3, Wii and Wii U. It was later ported to Microsoft Windows and saw a party video game bearing its title for the Nintendo 3DS. Similarly to previous toy-to-life titles, the game is played in tandem with a physical base that reads the NFC tags of figurines. These figurines, when scanned in, unlock playable characters and items from Disney and Pixar properties that can then be used to play the game proper.

The game is split between two different styles of gameplay. In Playsets, the player plays through a story-driven set of missions themed after a different Disney or Pixar film. In the Toybox, players are dropped into a sandbox area where they can shape the terrain and place various different objects to create their own environment or game.

The game had a budget approaching $100 million. It has been followed by two sequels released in 2014 and 2015; Disney Infinity 2.0 and Disney Infinity 3.0 respectively.

== Gameplay ==
Disney Infinity is an action-adventure game with physical toys, open-world creation, and story-driven gameplay. Characters, playsets, and other features are brought into the game using figurines and discs with the included Infinity Base. With the exception of non-humanoid characters, such as those from the Cars series, each character has a double jump and a default set of attacks, as well as an ability unique to each figure. For example, Sulley and Jack Skellington can roar to scare others while Violet and Randall can turn invisible. There were two main modes in this game: Play Set and Toy Box. Each playset is essentially a self-contained world with its own gameplay, based on a specific film or series with recognizable characters and storylines. In play set mode, the player can earn items, tools, and characters to use in Toy Box mode. Characters from one world cannot enter into another world, but players can put any characters together in Toy Box mode. Toy Box is a sandbox mode that players can fully customize and explore, and earn items, tools, and characters to customize and explore from play sets.

=== Character Design ===
All characters have a unique design, but the females are different. Violet and Elastigirl both have oversized legs and feet and have a slight heel, Elsa's fingers are combined with her dress, Jessie has longer legs and her boots are sharper, and Rapunzel's fingers are combined with her dress, just like Elsa, but her toes are square-pointed.

=== Play Set Mode ===
There are a number of playsets available, which are accessed via placing the relevant playset piece onto the Infinity Base. These include Pirates of the Caribbean, Monsters University, The Incredibles, Cars, The Lone Ranger and Toy Story 3. These playsets have their own unique campaign, which could be played with up to two players (except for the Wii version). However, all characters from a specific franchise can only play in their respective playset (for example, Mr. Incredible cannot be used in the Pirates of the Caribbean playset), meaning two figures from the same series are required to play a play set in split-screen multiplayer. Playing through Play Set mode unlocks objects and vehicles that can be used in the Toy Box mode.

=== Toy Box mode ===
Toy Box mode allows players to create their own game in an open-world arena. Players can mix and match everything that is unlocked within each of the play sets including characters, weapons and gadgets. By unlocking new content in the Disney Infinity play sets, players are able to build their own worlds and essentially create their own game. There are various "adventures" in this mode, which help teach the player how to use the mode's tools. Players can also earn "spins" by playing through playsets or leveling up their characters, which can be used to unlock additional items. The mode supports online multiplayer, in which players can play around with items that only the other player has, albeit only during that session.

A portable Toy Box became available in late 2013, for the iPad. A version of the Toy Box is also available for Windows PC. These versions of the Toy Box utilized the web codes included with each Disney Infinity character.

=== Physical elements ===
Box art of "Starter Pack" containing three figurines; Captain Jack Sparrow, Mr. Incredible, and James P. "Sulley" Sullivan.

The Starter Pack edition of the game was bundled with three figurines (Sulley, Mr. Incredible, and Jack Sparrow), three play sets, and an Infinity Base. The Infinity Base has two round spots to place figurines, and a hexagonal spot to place world discs. When the figurines are placed on the Infinity Base, the characters are imported into the game, while world discs unlock Play Sets.

Power Discs are discs that can be placed on the Infinity Base along with their characters to add new elements to the game. Players can use up to three environment enhancements (Hexagonal Power Discs) that can only be used in the Toy Box mode and up to two character enhancements (Circular Power Discs) per character. The environment enhancements can alter the terrain, change the background "sky", add new vehicles or add new weapons. The character enhancements will alter things about the character such as damage done, replenish health, allow for faster experience gain for leveling and so on. One Power Disc is included with the Starter Pack while additional discs are sold in blind bags each containing two discs.

=== Alternate versions ===
Following a delay, the PC version of Disney Infinity was released on November 14, 2013. This version was available free of charge and could be downloaded from the Disney Infinity website. It originally contained the game's Toy Box mode, similar to the iPad version. However, a patch was released on February 28, 2014 that added in all six Play Sets, putting it on par with the console versions. The game featured several changes from the console version, however. The game did not support the Infinity Base. Instead, characters were unlocked either by purchasing them from the Disney Infinity website (at a discounted rate, due to the lack of a physical figurine) or by redeeming a web code card included with the physical figurines. Since Power Discs do not come with web codes, they had to be purchased from the PC Shop. The game also did not support multiplayer, though players could link up with the console version to share Toy Boxes between the two versions.

Due to the space limitations of the Wii platform, some design decisions had to be made in the game. The gameplay does not have online play or multiplayer in Play Sets, but there is multiplayer in Toy Box. That means that there are smaller playset worlds and no downloadable or shareable Toy Box worlds. Toy Box has six different worlds, each with different toys and tools. On August 21, 2014, the Disney Infinity software was released as a free download for the North American Wii U eShop, for the convenience of upgrading to the superior Wii U version for players who originally own the Wii Starter Pack, although the Wii version is backwards-compatible on Wii U. The game's subsequent sequels, Disney Infinity 2.0 and Disney Infinity 3.0, were not available for Wii.

Different from the console and PC versions, the Nintendo 3DS version of the game is a party game, in which up to four players play on various themed game boards and participate in various minigames. The Toy Box mode can be used to create new game boards. This version uses its own Infinity Base, which has only one character slot compared to the console version, and connects to the 3DS wirelessly.

== Development ==
The idea for the game emerged out of Avalanche's previous work on the video game adaptation of Toy Story 3. One of the more well-received modes of the game was an open world section called "The Toybox", and the team set out to make a spiritual successor to the mode which would have been set at Star Command. The team was challenged by Disney Interactive's new president John Pleasants who asked the developers "What is the biggest idea you can think of" at which point the team decided to switch from making a single game to making a platform that would use multiple IPs.

== Reception ==
Reception

Aggregate score
Aggregator	Score
Metacritic	(X360) 74/100 (PS3) 75/100 (WIIU) 71/100

Review scores
Publication	Score
Game Informer	9/10
GameRevolution	4/5
GameSpot	6/10
GamesRadar+	2.5/5
GameTrailers	8.6/10
IGN	8.7/10
Joystiq	4/5
Official Xbox Magazine (US)	8/10
Polygon	8/10
PlayStation: The Official Magazine	7/10

Disney Infinity received generally positive reviews from critics (except for the 3DS version, which received negative reviews). It received a 75 and 74 out of 100 on review aggregator site Metacritic, for PlayStation 3 and Xbox 360 respectively.

During the 17th Annual D.I.C.E. Awards, the Academy of Interactive Arts & Sciences nominated Disney Infinity for "Family Game of the Year".

The sandbox mode, namely the Toy Box Mode, received much praise. Steven O'Donnell of Good Game: Spawn Point stated that "it's a bit like Minecraft in that you're dropped into an open world that you can then build some pretty spectacular structures in." Kevin VanOrd of GameSpot called the Toy Box "a gleefully entertaining shared space," and greatly preferred it over the story mode.

The figurines of the playable characters received mixed to positive reactions. Daniel Krupa of IGN said that they're "well-made statues," and that "each one really captures the personality of that character with a charismatic stance." The soundtrack and dialogue of Disney Infinity also received mixed reactions. Andrew Reiner of Game Informer said that "characters repeat dialogue way too often," and that the soundtrack is "often surprisingly absent." Andy Robertson of Forbes stated that his children loved playing the figurines, both in the game and as toys.

The overall price of the game and all of the toys received media coverage. Jeff Cork of Game Informer said that to purchase all items at the launch (the game, all launch toys, and power discs) it costs a minimum of AUD$460. Kevin VanOrd of GameSpot called Disney Infinity "a platform designed to keep you spending money." Nick Cowen of The Guardian warned parents to "get ready with those wallets."

In September 2013, Disney revealed that the game had sold 294,000 copies in the United States during its first two weeks on sale.

On October 18, 2013, Disney Interactive announced that the game had sold more than one million copies worldwide. With more figures not yet released, Disney hoped the number of units sold would continue to grow. As of January 20, 2014, three million starter packs had been sold.

The game was nominated for the Nickelodeon Kids' Choice Awards in 2014, but lost to Just Dance 2014.

On May 10, 2016, the future plans for Disney Infinity were cancelled, although the reasons why are not clear. After the announcement, Disney continued to release concept art of characters that were being planned for release but were never produced, including characters such as Marvel's Doctor Strange and Spider-Gwen.

== Sequels ==
=== Disney Infinity 2.0 ===
On April 30, 2014, Disney announced a follow-up game, Disney Infinity 2.0, for release on Xbox 360, PlayStation 3, PlayStation Vita, Wii U, iOS, Android, Microsoft Windows, Xbox One, and PlayStation 4 in Q4 2014, featuring characters from the Marvel Comics universe. The game features improved Toy Box editor tools and introduces Toy Box Games, discs which allow players to create games based on genres such as tower defense. The game is also compatible with all figurines and accessories from the previous Disney Infinity. The starter pack contains figures of Iron Man, Thor, and Black Widow, with figures being released separately alongside the game such as Captain America, Hulk, Hawkeye, Falcon, Loki, Stitch, Maleficent, Donald Duck, Tinker Bell, Princess Merida, Hiro Hamada, Baymax, Aladdin, Jasmine, the Guardians of the Galaxy, Ronan the Accuser, Spider-Man, Nova, Iron Fist, Venom, Nick Fury and the Green Goblin.

=== Disney Infinity 3.0 ===
On May 5, 2015, Disney announced a follow-up game through Game Informer, Disney Infinity 3.0, for release on Xbox 360, PlayStation 3, Wii U, iOS, PC, Xbox One, and PlayStation 4 in 2015, featuring characters from the Star Wars universe and Iron Man Hulkbuster.
