= Lego The Incredibles =

2018 action-adventure game

- Developer: TT Fusion (Note: macOS version developed by Feral Interactive)
- Publisher: Warner Bros. Interactive Entertainment (Note: macOS version published by Feral Interactive)
- Director: Pete Gomer
- Composer: Simon Withenshaw (Note: Original The Incredibles themes by Michael Giacchino)
- Platforms: Nintendo Switch; PlayStation 4; Windows; Xbox One; macOS
- Release: Nintendo Switch, PlayStation 4, Windows, Xbox One: NA: 15 June 2018; AU: 29 June 2018; EU: 13 July 2018; JP: 2 August 2018; macOS: WW: 21 November 2018
- Genre: Action-adventure
- Modes: Single-player, multiplayer

Lego The Incredibles is a 2018 action-adventure game developed by TT Fusion and published by Warner Bros. Interactive Entertainment. Based on the Pixar franchise of the same name, it was released on 15 June 2018 in North America, 29 June in Australasia, 13 July in Europe, and 2 August in Japan on Nintendo Switch, PlayStation 4, Windows and Xbox One coinciding with the theatrical release of Incredibles 2.

A macOS version of the game was developed and published by Feral Interactive on 21 November.

== Gameplay ==
The gameplay is very similar to the previous Lego installments, with puzzles designed for younger players, various waves of fighting enemies and two-player cooperative gameplay. The game allows the player to control various superheroes and villains alike from across the franchise (including supers that have appeared in neither of the films but are listed in the National Supers Agency database in the special features of the first film's DVD release), each with their own special abilities and superpowers. For example, Mr. Incredible has super-strength and invulnerability, Elastigirl can shape her body in many ways, Violet Parr can turn invisible and create force fields, Dash can run at incredible speeds and Jack-Jack has a large variety of powers, just like in the films, such as turning into a being of pure fire, telekinesis and teleportation, to name a few. The game also includes various characters from other Pixar properties, such as A Bug's Life's Flik, Brave's Merida, Lightning McQueen from the Cars franchise, James P. "Sulley" Sullivan from the Monsters, Inc. franchise and Woody from the Toy Story franchise.

The open-world of the game is set in a pair of fictional cities from the movies, Municiberg and New Urbem, which are situated very close to each other. Apart from the typical gold bricks puzzles, quests and challenges, the game adds a new feature called the Crime Wave, in which the player travels to a specific area of one of the cities which is under assault from a super-villain and their minions. The player must complete all the quests given by the people in the area to complete the Crime Wave. The final quest usually involves defeating the supervillain. There are ten Crime Waves in total and five supervillains to defeat: three from the films (Syndrome, Bomb Voyage and the Underminer) and two original characters exclusive to the game (Brainfreezer and Anchor-Man). Like other Lego titles, Lego The Incredibles allows players to create their own custom character with different powers and abilities.

The game received a single downloadable content pack, "Parr Family Vacation", which adds the Parr family and Lucius in vacation clothes to the character roster. The DLC was released on the same day as the game, with the Nintendo Switch version getting it in July 2018.

== Plot ==
The game's story closely follows the plot of both of the franchise's films, though with numerous humorous deviations. The game begins with the events of the second film, which the player must complete before gaining access to that of the first. There are also several major changes to both films' storylines, such as Mr. Incredible being aided by Frozone in fighting the first Omnidroid on the Nomanisan island (there are two Omnidroids in the boss battle), Gazerbeam surviving and helping Mr. Incredible sneak inside into the secret room, or Syndrome being simply defeated when Jack Jack's power activates and going into hiding rather than dying after being sucked into his jet's engine.

== Reception ==
Reception

Aggregate score
Aggregator	Score
Metacritic	NS: 65/100; PS4: 69/100; XONE: 74/100

Review scores
Publication	Score
Destructoid	6.5/10
Nintendo Life	7/10
Nintendo World Report	7/10
Push Square	6/10
The Guardian	3/5

Lego The Incredibles received "mixed or average" reviews from critics on Metacritic. For its aggregated score, the PlayStation 4 version received a 69 out of 100, the Nintendo Switch version received a 65 out of 100, and the Xbox One version received a 74 out of 100.

Alex Stinton of Push Square praised the game for its faithfulness to the source material and humor, though they were disappointed by the repetitive gameplay and voice acting.

The game was nominated for "Fan Favorite Family-Friendly Multiplayer Game" at the Gamers' Choice Awards, for "Favorite Video Game" at the 2019 Kids' Choice Awards, and for "Family" at the 15th British Academy Games Awards.
