= Stephen Schaffer =

American film editor

Stephen Schaffer is an American film editor who has worked on several films produced by Pixar. At the 59th American Cinema Editors Awards, he won an ACE Award for Best Edited Feature Film – Comedy or Musical for WALL-E; this marked the first time the award went to the editor of an animated film.

== Filmography as editor ==
- Elemental (2023)
- Incredibles 2 (2018)
- The Good Dinosaur (2015)
- Cars 2 (2011)
- WALL-E (2008)
- Cars (2006) (race sequence editor and additional voices)
- Jack-Jack Attack (2005) (short)
- The Incredibles (2004) (also additional voices)
- Osmosis Jones (2001)
- WWE Tough Enough (2001)

== Awards and nominations ==
=== ACE Awards ===
- WALL-E (2008), won (Best Edited Feature Film – Comedy or Musical)
- The Good Dinosaur (2015), nominated (Best Edited Feature Film – Comedy or Musical)
- The Incredibles (2004), nominated (Best Edited Feature Film – Comedy or Musical)

=== OFCS Award for Best Editing ===
- WALL-E (2008), nominated
