= Nicole Paradis Grindle =

American film producer

- Occupation: Film producer
- Years active: 1988–present

Nicole Paradis Grindle is an American film producer. Her producing credits include numerous animated films released by Pixar.

== Career ==
Grindle served as a producer of Incredibles 2 (2018), Hoppers (2026) and the short animated film Sanjay's Super Team (2015), which received a nomination in the category of Best Animated Short Film at the 88th Academy Awards, and for Best Animated Short Subject at the 43rd Annie Awards. She is also an associate producer for Toy Story 3 (2010) and Monsters University (2013).
