= Disney Infinity =

Toys-to-life sandbox video game series

- Genres: Action-adventure; Sandbox; Toys-to-life
- Developer: Avalanche Software
- Publisher: Disney Interactive Studios
- Platforms: Xbox 360, Nintendo 3DS, Wii, Wii U, PlayStation 3, PlayStation 4, PlayStation Vita, Microsoft Windows, Xbox One, iOS, Apple TV, Android
- First release: Disney Infinity; August 18, 2013
- Latest release: Disney Infinity 3.0; August 28, 2015

Disney Infinity is an American action-adventure sandbox toys-to-life video game series developed by Avalanche Software. The setting of the series was a giant customizable universe of imagination, known as the Toy Box, populated with toy versions of iconic Disney, Pixar, Marvel and Star Wars characters.

As Avalanche Software was closed down on May 11, 2016, Disney announced that the franchise would be retired, despite some sources stating that there were some major plans in place to keep the series alive, and the presence of numerous new characters and playsets previously planned. (Avalanche Software has since reopened under Warner Bros. Interactive Entertainment.) However, "Gold Editions" of the three games in the series were released for Microsoft Windows (via Steam) on December 9, 2016, which contain all the existing released figures and playset contents.

== Games ==
Title	Release date	Platform											
Title	Release date	PlayStation 3	PlayStation 4	PlayStation Vita	Xbox 360	Xbox One	Wii	Wii U	Nintendo 3DS	Microsoft Windows	iOS	Apple TV	Android
Disney Infinity	August 18, 2013	Yes	No	No	Yes	No	Yes	Yes	Party game	Yes	Toy-Box	No	No
Disney Infinity 2.0	September 23, 2014	Yes	Yes	Yes	Yes	Yes	No	Yes	No	Yes	Toy-Box	No	Toy-Box
Disney Infinity 3.0	August 30, 2015	Yes	Yes	No	Yes	Yes	No	Yes	No	Yes	Toy-Box	Yes	Toy-Box

== Gameplay ==
Disney Infinity games are action-adventure games with physical toys, open-world creation and story-driven gameplay. Characters, playsets and other features are brought into the game using figurines and discs with the included Infinity Base. With the exception of non-human characters, such as those from the Cars series, each character has a double jump (unless in a vehicle) and a default set of attacks, as well as a unique ability. For example, Sulley and Jack Skellington can roar to scare others, while Violet and Randall can turn invisible. There are two main modes in this game: Play Set and Toy Box. Each playset is essentially a self-contained world with its own gameplay, based on a specific film or series with recognizable characters and storylines. Characters from one world cannot enter into another world, but players can put any characters together in Toy Box mode. Toy Box is a sandbox mode that players can fully customize and explore. It is possible to use the MagicBand to unlock various items.

=== Play Set mode ===
There are a number of playsets available in the series, which are accessed via placing the relevant playset piece onto the Infinity Base and are based upon several intellectual property franchises. These playsets include:

Disney Infinity 1.0

- Pirates of the Caribbean
- Monsters University
- The Incredibles
- Cars
- The Lone Ranger
- Toy Story in Space

Disney Infinity 2.0

- The Avengers
- Spider-Man
- Guardians of the Galaxy

Disney Infinity 3.0

- Star Wars: Twilight of the Republic
- Star Wars: Rise Against the Empire
- Star Wars: The Force Awakens
- Inside Out
- Finding Dory
- Marvel Battlegrounds

These playsets have their own unique campaign, which can be played with up to two players. All characters from a specific franchise can only play in their respective playset (for example, Mr. Incredible can't be used in the Pirates of the Caribbean playset), meaning two figures from the same series are required to play a playset in split-screen multiplayer. However, Marvel and Star Wars playsets (excluding Marvel Battlegrounds) feature collectable "Crossover/Champion coins", which enable the use of certain characters from different playsets. Playing through a playset unlocks objects and vehicles that can be used in the Toy Box mode.

=== Toy Box mode ===
Toy Box mode allows players to create their own game in an open-world arena. Players can mix and match everything that is unlocked within each of the playsets including characters, weapons and gadgets. By unlocking new content in the Disney Infinity playsets, players are able to build their own worlds and essentially create their own game. There are various "adventures" in this mode, which help teach the player how to use the mode's tools. Players can also earn "spins" by playing through playsets or leveling up their characters, which can be used to unlock additional items. The mode supports online multiplayer, in which players can play around with items that only the other player has, albeit only during that session.

A portable Toy Box became available in late 2013, exclusively for the iPad. A version of the Toy Box is also available for Microsoft Windows. These versions of the Toy Box utilize the web codes included with each Disney Infinity character.

=== Physical elements ===
The Infinity Base has two round spots to place figurines, and a hexagonal spot to place world discs. When the figurines are placed on the Infinity Base, the characters are imported into the game, while world discs unlock Play Sets.

Power Discs are discs that can be placed on the Infinity Base along with their characters to add new elements to the game. Players can use up to three environment enhancements (Hexagonal Power Discs) that can only be used in the Toy Box mode and up to two character enhancements (Circular Power Discs) per character. The environment enhancements can alter the terrain, change the background "sky," add new vehicles or add new weapons. The character enhancements will alter things about the character such as damage done, replenish health, allow for faster experience gain for leveling and so on. One Power Disc is included with the Starter Pack while additional discs are sold in blind bags each containing two discs.

== Disney Toy Box ==
Following the cancellation of the series, it was announced that Disney would be launching a series of action figures based on the art style used in the games.
