= List of The Incredibles characters =

The Incredibles. From left to right: Elastigirl, Mr. Incredible, Violet, and Dash. Bottom: Jack-Jack

The Incredibles, an American media franchise, tells the story of superheroes, also known as "Supers," co-existing with society. Set in a retro-futuristic version of the 1960s, the film series revolves around the Supers' struggles to live suburban lives as ordinary citizens while keeping their powers hidden due to a government mandate.

The film series consists of two films, The Incredibles (2004) and Incredibles 2 (2018) and revolves around Bob Parr's fight against villainous threats despite his quiet family life. Bob's desire to relive his glory days as a Super leads him to a series of conflicts against a fan-turned-supervillain and his mechanical robots. Bob's struggle is the main plot of the original series.

== The Parr Family (The Incredibles) ==
=== Bob Parr (Mr. Incredible) ===
Robert "Bob" Parr (a.k.a. Mr. Incredible) (voiced by Craig T. Nelson) possesses superhuman strength, stamina, and durability. He is married to Helen Parr, the superheroine known as Elastigirl, and they have three children together: Violet, Dash, and Jack-Jack. His face was physically modeled after director Brad Bird.

During his early career, Bob rejects Buddy Pine, his self-proclaimed "Number 1 Fan", as a prospective sidekick. Sometime after marrying Elastigirl, Bob is sued by Oliver Sansweet for thwarting his suicide. Five days later, he is sued by the injured passengers of the L-Train that Bob had been forced to abruptly halt for its own safety. These lawsuits cost the government millions and are the first in a string of expensive lawsuits against supers, forcing the government to initiate the Superhero Relocation Program. Finding forced retirement difficult, Bob often sneaks out at night with his friend Lucius Best (a.k.a. Frozone) to continue their now-illegal superheroics. Eventually, Bob realizes that his family is his "greatest adventure".

His red superhero suit, designed by Edna Mode, appears to have the same level of durability as Mr. Incredible himself. In his prime, Mr. Incredible rides a gadget-laden car, the Incredibile, reminiscent of those driven by James Bond or Batman. The silhouette of a newer version of the Incredibile for the Parrs is seen in the end credits of the first film, and the new car makes a full appearance at the end of the second film.

Mr. Incredible was ranked number 5 in IGN's list of the Top 10 Pixar Characters. Readers of Empire magazine also voted Mr. Incredible number 8 in that magazine's list of The Top 20 Pixar Characters.

=== Helen Parr (Elastigirl) ===
Helen Parr (a.k.a. Elastigirl or Mrs. Incredible) (voiced by Holly Hunter) is Mr. Incredible's wife. Helen can stretch any part of her body up to 300 feet and can be 1 mm thin. She can also reshape her body in a variety of ways; she can become a parachute and a rubber boat, and has used her arms for swings and a slingshot. However, intense cold renders her body structure too fragile for stretching. In her early years, she seemed to be a feminist and had no desire to "settle down". Since her marriage to Bob, Helen has become a dedicated spouse and mother, although she is frustrated with her husband's continuing dreams of glory. Helen is also an experienced jet pilot, from having a close friend who flew her around the world when she was a Super. Her sharp wit and superb espionage skills, as well as her experience as a superhero, make her an excellent tactician and leader. The filmmakers drew inspiration from actresses Mary Tyler Moore, Marilyn Monroe and Audrey Hepburn for Helen's role and appearance in the sequel.

Her red superheroine suit, designed by Edna Mode, can stretch as far as she can and still retain its shape. It is virtually indestructible yet it breathes like Egyptian cotton.

Gina Bennett, interviewed by Maureen Dowd as part of a group of current and former CIA professionals, said "the Band of Sisters had a favorite crime fighter .... Just think of us as a work force of Elastigirls."

=== Violet Parr ===
Violet Parr (voiced by Sarah Vowell) is the Parrs' daughter and a 14-year-old junior high school teenager stuck at the crossroads between girl and woman. Violet desperately wants to be like everyone else, to blend in with normal people, and not to stand out. Her superpowers allow her to turn instantly invisible, and to generate spherical force fields to protect herself and also to levitate extremely heavy objects; the interiors of the force fields have an anti-gravitational effect, allowing Violet to levitate inside, but she can be stunned temporarily if the field is struck by a sufficiently large force. In The Incredibles 2, she has learned to use her force fields in a limited offensive capability by delivering force "punches".

She and Dash can combine their powers to create the IncrediBall (named in the video game), a tactic in which Violet generates a force field around herself, and Dash uses his speed power to use the ball like a cannonball or battering ram. Her struggle with her shyness and lack of confidence constitutes a major side story in the movie; she is spurred on by Helen's encouragement that she has more power than she realizes and that she just has to believe it. In the end, Violet sheds her shyness and ends up at the confident side when her crush Tony Rydinger asks her for a date.

Unlike her normal clothes, her red superheroine suit, designed by Edna Mode, also turns invisible when Violet does.

=== Dash Parr ===
Dashiell "Dash" Robert Parr (voiced by Spencer Fox in the first film, Huck Milner in the second film) is the Parrs' older son and a speedster. While he is only as strong as the average 10-year-old boy, the film's official website lists "enhanced durability" amongst Dash's powers, which is implied in the film by the amount of incidental high-speed collisions and crashes Dash endures without apparent injury. Dash also discovers throughout the course of the movie that his speed allows him to be able to run over water without submerging.

Dash would like to go out for sports, but his mother Helen will not allow it because she thinks that he would show off his superspeed and blow the family's civilian cover. To vent his frustration, Dash uses his power to play pranks on his teacher, Bernie Kropp, which also threatens their cover.

Dash's reckless and impulsive nature and one-track mind have put him at odds with Violet's gloomier and more sarcastic nature more often than their parents would like, but when Dash is in battle, he cares deeply about his family; he was willing to attack a fully grown man who was about to kill his sister.

His red superhero suit, designed by Edna Mode, is resistant to air friction, wear and heat when Dash is running at super speed.

=== Jack-Jack Parr ===
John Jackson "Jack-Jack" Parr (voiced by Eli Fucile and Maeve Andrews in the first film, Fucile and Nicholas Bird in the second film) is the Parrs' infant son, the youngest of the Parr children. Initially believed to be the only family member without any powers and shown as a minor character (as he did not join the family in the first film), he manifests a multitude of superhuman abilities at the end of the first film, most of which are types of shapeshifting, when Syndrome tries to kidnap him. More powers are seen in the short film Jack-Jack Attack on the Incredibles DVD, making his powers the most versatile of the family, and according to a collectible poster included with some Incredibles toys, still more powers are undisclosed.

Although Edna Mode did not know what powers Jack-Jack might develop, she covered various possibilities by making him a fireproof and bulletproof blanket sleeper-like jumpsuit. Creator Brad Bird explains on the DVD that Jack-Jack's varied abilities are a metaphor for how young children have infinite possibilities ahead of them in life. He begins to manifest a broader range of powers during Incredibles 2, inspiring Edna to upgrade his suit with sensors that allow his family to track him or rein in his powers via remote control.

Jack-Jack was ranked number 15 in Empire magazine's list of the Top 20 Pixar Characters.

== Allies ==

=== Frozone ===
Lucius Best (a.k.a. Frozone) (voiced by Samuel L. Jackson) is a long-time friend of the Parr family. Frozone is Bob Parr's best friend, and was the best man at Bob and Helen's wedding. Frozone has the power to freeze water as well as ambient moisture in the air. He is limited by the amount of water or moisture available. He can use the moisture of his own body, but that dehydration weakens his abilities as a result. During the first film, it is suggested that he has adapted to civilian life much more easily than Bob, though he still possesses a hidden cache containing his costume and all of his old gadgets in working condition.

Lucius married a woman (unseen but heard to the audience), Honey (Kimberly Adair Clark). She is aware of his superhero past, but she is unsupportive of his public-minded ideals. Lucius is a close family friend of the Parrs, who are the only supers he socializes with following the banning of superheroes. Whenever Lucius and Bob go out on Wednesdays to engage in superheroics, they have to cover from their respective wives by claiming to be going bowling, but they stop going out when Bob is caught by Helen. Lucius's super suit is designed to keep him warm in the cold, but he must wear a special set of refraction goggles not only to protect his identity, but also to protect his eyes from the glare of the sunlight that bounces off his ice crystals. The soles of Frozone's snow boots can change into ice skates, alpine ice skis, and a concave disc he uses as a snowboard. These forms of transport, combined with chutes of ice, result in particularly speedy travel.

Frozone was ranked number 16 in Empire magazine's list of the Top 20 Pixar Characters.

Frozone returns in Incredibles 2. He helps the Incredibles stop the Underminer's drill, and after the battle learns of Winston Deavor's offer to restore public trust in superheroes, bringing Helen and Bob with him to meet Deavor together. He is later overwhelmed by other hypnotized Supers when he unsuccessfully attempts to protect the Parr children from them, and is put under Evelyn's mind control via goggles. However, he is freed by Helen and her children and aids in foiling Evelyn's plan.

=== Edna Mode ===
Edna "E" Mode (voiced by Brad Bird) is an eccentric fashion designer who designs the costumes for many members of the superhero community. To that end, not only does she take the aesthetics of the clothes into account, but also their practical uses such as protective qualities and accommodation to the powers of the wearer. She was a guest at Mr. Incredible and Elastigirl's wedding. Rick Dicker, who felt that Edna was "difficult" to work with, was the one who first referred Elastigirl to Edna. Edna was conceived as an amalgam between James Bond's gadget supplier, Q, and Oscar-winning costume designer Edith Head. Pixar artist Teddy Newton, who co-designed the character, stated that the film's animators looked for inspiration in the 1995 fashion documentary Unzipped, which spotlighted a number of designers, including Isaac Mizrahi and Polly Mellen. Edna Mode also appeared with Pierce Brosnan to present the Academy Award for Costume Design at the 77th Academy Awards. Edna refuses to design super suits with capes in light of the number of supers having unfortunate accidents because their capes got caught in airliner turbines, elevators, missiles and other hazards. The film's creators originally could not find an appropriate actress to voice Edna. Finally, when asking actress Lily Tomlin to voice Edna, Brad Bird provided an example of what she should sound like. Tomlin told Bird that he successfully captured her voice so well that he should provide it in the film himself, which Bird did.

Edna Mode was ranked number 8 in IGN's list of the Top 10 Pixar Characters, and number 6 in Empire magazine's list of the Top 20 Pixar Characters.

When Bob visits Edna to get his old super suit patched up in The Incredibles, she is inspired to create new suits for the entire family, including Jack-Jack even though he has not yet exhibited any powers.

She returns in Incredibles 2, offering to babysit Jack-Jack for an exhausted Bob, and upgrades Jack-Jack's suit with sensors that allow the family to track him and curb his newly manifested powers via remote control. The time she spends looking after Jack-Jack is the focus of the short Auntie Edna.

=== Rick Dicker ===
Rick Dicker (voiced by Bud Luckey in the first film, Jonathan Banks in the second film) is a government agent who was once part of the NSA (National Supers Agency) and now belongs to the Superhero Relocation Program. He was one of the guests present at Mr. Incredible and Elastigirl's wedding. Though appreciative of Bob's former work during the "Glory Days", Rick is exasperated by Bob's clinging on to the past; Bob's antics often force Rick to clean up expensive damages and erase memories. However, he congratulates the Parr Family after the Omnidroid's defeat, and assures them the government will happily take care of whatever needs to be done this time.

In the short film Jack-Jack Attack, Rick interrogates Kari McKeen about the events that unfolded while she was babysitting Jack-Jack; afterwards, he erases her memory of the incident. In the DVD commentary, Brad Bird jokes that he had an idea to start Luckey's short film Boundin' with Rick coming into his office late at night, pulling out a bottle of "booze" and a banjo to begin telling the story.

Rick also appears in Incredibles 2; with the government shutting down the Superhero Relocation Program in response to the Underminer incident, Rick is forced into retirement. Rick does two favors for the Parrs before his retirement; he erases Tony Rydinger's memory of the Underminer incident and secures the Parrs a hotel room for two weeks, but he warns them they will be on their own after that. Though Bob later asks Rick for information on Tony when Violet lashes out against the erasing of Tony's memories.

=== Snug ===
Snug is an old friend of Helen Parr, presumably from her super days as Elastigirl. He never appears in the films, but his voice can be heard on the phone when Helen calls him to acquire a jet to access Syndrome's island (in The Incredibles). Snug can be seen in a photograph held by Helen that shows the two of them in aviation gear. In a deleted scene, Snug was intended to travel with them on the plane to the island and would be killed in the following crash with the missiles, but this was rewritten to have Helen pilot the plane solo instead.

=== Winston Deavor ===
Winston Deavor (voiced by Bob Odenkirk) is an ardent superhero fan who leads a telecommunications company with his sister Evelyn.

In Incredibles 2, he wants to re-legalize supers, whose activities have been outlawed by the government, through a marketing campaign. Winston selects Helen Parr to carry out a publicity stunt as Elastigirl in order to regain the general public's support of supers, and houses the Parr family in a luxurious mansion. His sister, however, places him under her control via hypnotic signals transmitted by television screens, as part of her scheme to permanently undermine the legal status of supers. She intends to do this by sabotaging a summit of supers and similarly hypnotized political delegates taking place on the Deavors' cruise ship by crashing the ship into the city. When Winston is freed from her control, he aids in foiling Evelyn's plan to collide his cruise ship into the city by reboarding the runaway ship and freeing the delegates to then ensure their safety, while the supers attempt to regain control of the ship. He later presumably explains the truth of his sister's scheme to the delegates and to the authorities to legalize the superheroes again.

== Civilians ==
=== Oliver Sansweet ===
Oliver Sansweet is the president of a bank in Municiberg, who attempts suicide by jumping from the top of a large building. Mr. Incredible saves him, but Sansweet's neck is injured in the process. He sues Mr. Incredible for damages as his lawyer states to the press that he did not want to be saved and that the neck injury causes him daily pain. When Mr. Incredible stated that he saved his life, Sansweet quoted "You didn't save my life, you ruined my death. That's what you did". Mr. Incredible starts to make a response as his lawyer cuts him off quoting "My client has no further comment at this time". The lawsuit against Mr. Incredible becomes the first in a string of anti-Superhero lawsuits, which eventually force the government to initiate the Superhero Relocation Program.

=== Gilbert Huph ===
Gilbert Huph (voiced by Wallace Shawn) is Bob's diminutive, temperamental supervisor at the Insuricare insurance company. Huph's main priority at Insuricare is its stockholders and profit margins; this often leads to disagreements with Bob, who prioritizes helping people in need and will not deny any claims, secretly teaching customers how to exploit Insuricare's loopholes to ensure they obtain their money.

Huph later lectures Bob for how much his philanthropic attitude is costing the company. Bob attempts to help a mugging victim, but Huph threatens to dismiss him if he does so. A frustrated Bob throws Huph through several walls, and Huph is subsequently hospitalized. In a deleted scene, Rick Dicker erases Huph's memories of the incident.

=== Bernie Kropp ===
Bernard "Bernie" Kropp (voiced by Lou Romano) is a teacher at Dash Parr's elementary school. Dash frequently uses his super-speed to prank Kropp, making it difficult for the teacher to prove his guilt. After Dash places a thumbtack on Kropp's stool, Kropp tells Helen that he hid a security camera inside the classroom. Since Dash moves so quickly that the low-quality camera cannot clearly record his motion blur, the principal allows Dash to leave the office, frustrating Kropp.

=== Tony Rydinger ===
Anthony "Tony" Rydinger (voiced by Michael Bird) is a junior high school teenager, attending the same school as Violet Parr. Violet harbors a secret crush on him. With boosted confidence, Violet attracts Tony's attention and he asks her out on a date, which she accepts.

In Incredibles 2, Tony accidentally witnesses Violet in her supersuit unmasked during their battle with the Underminer, which results in Rick Dicker being forced to wipe Tony's memory of the day, including that of Violet and his planned date with her. Following Evelyn Deavor's defeat, Violet is forced to start from scratch with Tony, asking him out to the movies again. However, she is forced to leave him at the cinema (with the promise of returning quickly) when the Incredibles are dispatched to attack a new threat.

=== Kari McKeen ===
Kari McKeen (voiced by Bret Parker) is a friend of the Parrs, whom Violet calls upon to babysit Jack-Jack while the rest of the family are flying to save Mr. Incredible (in The Incredibles). She has taken numerous babysitting classes, and assures Helen that she is more than adequately prepared to care for Jack-Jack in any capacity. She is heard later on Mrs. Parr's voice mail, complaining that some "very weird things" are happening and that Jack-Jack has "special needs". Her eventful night with the baby is detailed in the Jack-Jack Attack short included on the DVD release; Kari is indeed shown to be a competent babysitter, as she quickly learns to anticipate and prevent damage caused by Jack-Jack's powers. Her memory of the incident is later erased by Rick Dicker.

=== Ambassador Henrietta Selick ===
Ambassador Henrietta Selick (voiced by Isabella Rossellini) is a dignified foreign official committed to the support and legalization of superheroes. She is rescued by Elastigirl in Incredibles 2, when Evelyn attempts to kill her in her helicopter through her hypnotic screens.

== Antagonists ==
=== Syndrome ===
Buddy Pine, a.k.a. Syndrome (voiced by Jason Lee), is the main antagonist of The Incredibles. His primary motivation is his hatred of people with superpowers, and his desire to be known as a hero despite having no powers himself. Like Bob Parr, his character was physically modeled after Brad Bird.

In the film, Buddy is introduced as a precocious child who calls himself Mr. Incredible's "number one fan". Desiring to become Bob's sidekick "Incrediboy", Buddy uses gadgets of his own invention to compensate for the superpowers he does not have. Despite Bob repeatedly stating that he does not need a sidekick and Bomb Voyage insulting him, Buddy interferes with Bob's attempted arrest of supervillain Bomb Voyage. Voyage clips a bomb to Buddy's cloak, and Bob is forced to save Buddy, letting Voyage escape. After the bomb destroys an elevated train track, Bob turns Buddy over to the custody of the local police, blaming him for Bomb Voyage getting away, and to tell his mother of what he's been doing. Buddy becomes humiliated and disillusioned by Bob's rejection.

Eventually, Buddy recreates himself as Syndrome, a supervillain who uses his great intelligence to invent numerous devices, weapons and high-tech vehicles involving such principles as robotics, anti-gravity, and zero-point energy. Accumulating tremendous wealth selling many of his weapons, he owns a high-tech fortress on Nomanisan Island, complete with a complicated monorail system and a large staff of guards. Vowing revenge on Bob and all other superheroes, Syndrome invents the Omnidroid robot, perfecting it by having his assistant Mirage lure a large number of retired superheroes to be killed while fighting its various prototypes. Bob is the last superhero called to fight the Omnidroid. He destroys it, but Syndrome rebuilds it so it is capable of defeating Bob. When the Omnidroid triumphs, Syndrome finally revealing himself to his former idol.

After later capturing Bob and his family, Syndrome reveals his plan to unleash the Omnidroid and use remote controls to publicly "defeat" it, becoming a hero himself. He then plans to sell his superpower-imitating inventions to the public, making superheroes irrelevant. During the staged battle with the Omnidroid, Syndrome is knocked unconscious when his invention's artificial intelligence realizes he and his remote control as a threat. Syndrome awakens just in time to see the Parrs and Frozone being applauded for destroying the newest Omnidroid together. Syndrome retaliates by kidnapping Jack-Jack. As Syndrome attempts to fly away in his jet, Jack-Jack's superpowers manifest and he fights back. Helen rescues the baby. Bob battles Syndrome who is killed when he is sucked into one of the plane's engines due to his cape getting caught in it.

Syndrome was named the 64th Greatest Villain Ever by Wizard magazine, Screen Rant have described his characterisation as “a geeky kid” as being humorous despite his prowess as a villain. Rolling Stone ranked him as the 22nd best Pixar character.

==== Omnidroids ====
The Omnidroids are a series of dangerous battle robots developed by Syndrome specifically to fight and kill Supers. The Omnidroids are large and heavy constructions, and use a combination of brute strength and features such as claws, rockets, and laser guns to target and destroy their enemies. They are also equipped with artificial intelligence, and can quickly analyze enemies during battle, instantly adapting their fighting strategies to their enemies' weaknesses.

Syndrome has his assistant Mirage lure dozens of retired supers to come fight the prototype Omnidroids. Most of the supers are killed during their first encounter with the robot, but a few defeat it; each time a prototype is defeated, Syndrome analyzes the damage and rebuilds the machine with modifications to ensure the robot can slay the super in question during their second battle.

Eventually, the machine is perfected to such a degree that no individual superhero can defeat it. Syndrome unleashes the Omnidroid on the city of Metroville, planning to fight it in a staged battle while controlling it via a secret wristband remote, hoping to earn hero status himself. Unfortunately for Syndrome, the machine's artificial intelligence recognizes his remote control as a threat, and blasts it off his wrist before knocking him unconscious.

The final Omnidroid has only three known weaknesses; a lack of grip on slippery/icy surfaces, the ability to be externally influenced by the remote control, and the fact that its claws can penetrate its own protective shell. The Incredibles and Frozone use these weaknesses to their advantage during their final battle with the Omnidroid, eventually using its detached claw to destroy it.

==== Syndrome's Security Guards ====
Syndrome's Security Guards are made up of unnamed mercenaries that work for Syndrome.

=== Mirage ===
Mirage (voiced by Elizabeth Peña) appears as Syndrome's seductive right-hand woman and accomplice in the deaths of many Supers in the first film. Though she has no superhuman abilities, she has extensive computer and espionage skills. In her video message to Mr. Incredible she mentions that according to the government, neither of them officially exist.

Mirage is amoral to the point where she assists with Syndrome's systematic murder of the Supers. She reconsiders her position when Syndrome shows callous disregard for Elastigirl and the children onboard the plane. After he takes a gamble on her life, daring an imprisoned Mr. Incredible to kill her, Mirage subsequently frees Mr. Incredible and helps his family escape the island.

=== Bomb Voyage ===
Bomb Voyage (voiced by Dominique Louis) is a mime artist-themed French supervillain who uses explosives and is an enemy of Mr. Incredible. The character's name is a pun on the French phrase "bon voyage", meaning "have a nice trip".

He is first seen in The Incredibles stealing money from a bank vault. Mr. Incredible, happening to be on the scene by chance, attempts to arrest him, but aspiring hero's-sidekick Buddy Pine interrupts the confrontation. Despite being mocked by Voyage and told to stay out of it by Mr. Incredible, Buddy flies off to get the police; Voyage plants a bomb on Buddy's cape, forcing Mr. Incredible to rush off to save Buddy, thus allowing Voyage to escape. The police are informed of what happened as they are told by Mr. Incredible that they will get Voyage eventually.

Brad Bird originally pitched a character named Bomb Pérignon in reference to the similarly named champagne Dom Pérignon, but the Moët et Chandon company rejected the idea.

Voyage makes a cameo in the 2007 Pixar film Ratatouille as a street mime.

=== The Underminer ===
The Underminer (voiced by John Ratzenberger) is a mole-like supervillain who appears at the end of The Incredibles riding on a gigantic drill-tipped tank, where he announces his "war on peace and happiness".

This confrontation is continued at the beginning of Incredibles 2. After his declaration, the Underminer drills back underneath the ground and blows up the ground-areas holding up the Metroville Bank. He uses a vacuum hose to rob all of the savings in the Bank's vault, while Mr. Incredible tries to stop him. The Underminer is able to store all of the money in an escape pod, and he escapes from his tank before it runs out of control. The main tank is then disabled by the Parrs and Frozone. This battle, which caused collateral damage to the city, leads to the Superhero Relocation Program being discontinued and the warning by the government of legal action against Supers if they cause any more damage.

=== Screenslaver ===
In Incredibles 2, Evelyn Deavor (voiced by Catherine Keener) is Winston Deavor's sister and the chief designer for DevTech. She creates the masked villain persona Screenslaver in order to carry out her plans to hypnotize and control people undiscovered. When the Screenslaver himself is seemingly unmasked by Elastigirl, he turns out to be a confused pizza deliveryman (voiced by Bill Wise, who also provides the voice of Screenslaver when masked) who had been hypnotized by his mask's goggles into following Evelyn's orders. Evelyn forces another pair of goggles onto Elastigirl and reveals her plan to ruin Winston's summit so that the supers will fail to regain legal status. After gaining control of Mr. Incredible, Frozone, and several other supers, she is thwarted when Dash, Violet, and Jack-Jack free their parents, and Winston exposes Evelyn's plans to the world leaders. Evelyn attempts to flee while setting the summit ship on a collision course with the city of Municiberg. However, the supers stop the ship just in time, and Evelyn is captured and turned over to the police. Her name is a pun based on the phrase "evil endeavor."

== List of known superheroes ==
Most of the following information comes from one of four main sources, two of which are scenes from the first film. The first is Edna Mode's explanation to Bob of why she refuses to design supersuits with capes, which is accompanied by a montage of a number of late supers' deaths. The second is when Bob hacks into Syndrome's computer files. The third is the "NSA Files" feature in the "Top Secret" section of Disc 2 of The Incredibles two-disc DVD edition. A minor amount of information, such as information on Fironic, comes from other scenes in the film, as noted.

- Apogee – Her superpowers involved gravity control and levitation, which were powered by sunlight. She was a former member of The Thrilling Three, along with Gazerbeam and Phylange. Apogee believed that The Thrilling Three was really The Thrilling 1 + 2 in Gazerbeam's mind. Apogee was killed by the Omnidroid v. X4.
- Blazestone – Her superpowers involved the control of fire and the ability to fly using heat and the production of pyrotechnic discharges. She was a member of Beta Force and was once partners with Frozone before their partnership soured even when Frozone and Downburst feuded over her romantic affection. Blazestone was killed by the Omnidroid v. X2.
- Blitzerman – Blitzerman's superpowers are unknown. He was killed by a version of the Omnidroid, as early as version X4 but before X9.
- Downburst – In the film, his superpowers are given by Syndrome's files as gaseous downburst, but in the "NSA Files" feature on Disc 2 of the DVD, his powers are indicated to be atomic manipulation, meaning he could disrupt the atomic force among atoms. A member of Beta Force, he had an unrequited crush on Blazestone, but harbored a dislike of Frozone due to them competing for Blazestone's affection. Downburst was killed by the Omnidroid v. X3.
- Dynaguy – He had the ability to project a disintegration ray from his forehead and could fly courtesy of ion propulsion gauntlets. Dynaguy was one of the first supers sued following the Mr. Incredible lawsuits as seen in the newsreel where he was sued for public endangerment. He was killed when his cape became snagged during a takeoff. Following his death, Gazerbeam replaced him as leader of the Thrilling Three.
- Everseer – His superpowers included telepathy, clairvoyance, and "magnoscopic vision", with which he could see microscopically and telescopically. At one time, he was the leader of the Phantasmics and later fired Gazerbeam over a bitter rivalry between the two. Everseer had a British accent in the audio file in the "NSA Files" feature on Disc 2 of the DVD. Because of his ability to see things like germs, he suffered from obsessive-compulsive disorder. Everseer was killed by the Omnidroid v. X1.
- Fironic – Near the end of the film, a woman mistook Syndrome—who had just saved her and others from being crushed by a tanker truck which the Omnidroid v.10 had hurled at them—for Fironic. He only appears in a flashback scene in Incredibles 2, where it is shown that he and Gazerbeam were friends with Winston and Evelyn Deavor's father before his death due to superheroes being outlawed.
- Gamma Jack – His superpower was the ability to create controlled bursts of radiation. He had a reputation as a ladies' man who arrogantly believed supers to be a "superior race." Gamma Jack was infamous for causing significant collateral damage and was placed under heavy supervision by the NSA. Gamma Jack managed to destroy a prototype Omnidroid, but he was killed by its successor. The exact versions are unknown, but they were at least as early as version X5, but before X9.
- Simon James Paladino (a.k.a. Gazerbeam) – His powers allow him to generate energy blasts from his eyes. He is mentioned and briefly seen in The Incredibles. Gazerbeam was originally a member of the superhero team the Phantasmics, but rivalry with team leader Everseer led to Gazerbeam's dismissal. Following the death of Dynaguy, Gazerbeam replaced him as leader of the Thrilling Three, along with previously established members Phylange and Apogee. In-group tensions and arguments eventually led the threesome to permanently disband. Gazerbeam, in his civilian identity, became a pro-bono lawyer who entered politics to become a long-time advocate for superhero rights. Gazerbeam was killed on Nomanisan Island while attempting to disable an Omnidroid. The exact version was not revealed, but it was at least as late as version X4, but before X8, the first version later faced by Mr. Incredible. In The Incredibles 2, Gazerbeam and Fironic were friends with Winston and Evelyn Deavor's father before his death due to superheroes being outlawed.
- Hyper Shock – His superpower was the ability to generate seismic waves with his fists, with which he could create earthquake-like disruptions measuring 6.0 on the Richter scale. He also used dual seismic amplification hammers to amplify this effect, though the maximum range of this amplification is unknown. Hyper Shock managed to destroy the Omnidroid v. X3, but was killed by its successor, the Omnidroid v. X4.
- Macroburst – According to the government file on the DVD, Macroburst is an androgynous superhero, to the point that their gender is actually not known by the government. Their superpower was the ability to project high velocity winds. Macroburst was a sidekick to Everseer and later a member of the Phantasmics. Macroburst was the first Super to score a victory over an Omnidroid, defeating Omnidroid v. X1. They were later killed by its successor, Omnidroid v. X2.
- Meta-Man – His superpowers included flight, enhanced strength, x-ray vision, a sonic scream, teleportation, magnetic manipulation, partial invisibility and the ability to communicate with aquatic animals. He was one of the guests present at Mr. Incredible and Elastigirl's wedding. One of his archenemies was Baron von Ruthless (whom Dicker assumes to be responsible for the absence of Meta-Man's audio file—it was presumably confiscated during a surprise attack by von Ruthless; Frozone also mentions von Ruthless). Meta-Man was killed when his cape became entangled in steel framework while lifting an express elevator.
- Phylange – An opera singer in his civilian life, his superpower was the ability to project sonic fields with his voice, but suffered from chronic laryngitis which hindered his superpowers. He was a former member of the Thrilling Three, along with Dynaguy and later Gazerbeam after the former’s death and Apogee. Phylange was killed by the Omnidroid v. X2.
- Plasmabolt – Her superpowers involved shooting waves of plasma. She could also project electromagnetic energy, which was gathered from the antenna mounted on the head of her super suit and channelled to her hands. Her body also exhibited an electromagnetic aura. She was a member of the Phantasmics.
- Psycwave – Her superpowers included mental force wave generation, temporary mental paralysis, and the ability to possess the bodies of others. A member of the Phantasmics, she shared a therapist practice with Everseer. Psycwave was killed by the Omnidroid v. X1.
- Splashdown – His superpowers were water-based and also flight. He was capable of underwater high-speed travel and communication with undersea life. He was sucked into the vortex of a waterspout by his cape and went missing and is presumed dead.
- Stormicide – Syndrome's files on Stormicide listed her powers as electrical discharges and gale-force bursts, but the NSA Files on the DVD, Disc 2, which was clearer, and corroborated by an audio file of an interview with Stormicide, indicated that her power was the absorbance and expulsion of a variety of gases. Stormicide was killed by an Omnidroid, as early as version X5, but before X9.
- Stratogale – Stratogale possessed flight, superhuman strength and the ability to communicate with birds. In 1957, Stratogale was killed after her cape was caught in the engine of a jet airliner that she saved.
- Thunderhead – Thunderhead possessed storm-controlling powers. He was notably "good with kids" and the father of six adopted children. Thunderhead unfortunately had a reputation for low intelligence, according to Mr. Incredible, which is corroborated in his NSA file. In 1958, Thunderhead was killed after his cape was caught on the fin of an outbound missile.
- Tradewind – Tradewind was able to control the elements. He was killed by a version of the Omnidroid, as early as version X4 but before X9.
- Universal Man – His superpower involved the ability to manipulate the atomic density of materials, including altering the density of his own body to be as low as that of gas, to that of a black hole. Universal Man was the first Super killed by an Omnidroid, the Omnidroid v. X1. In the "NSA Files" feature on Disc 2 of the DVD, an audio file of an interview with him reveals him to have had a thick stereotypical Austrian accent and was apparently conducted in a weightlifting gym, given the background sounds, indicating that Universal Man was a parody of Arnold Schwarzenegger, who won the Mr. Universe multiple times.
- Vectress – Her superpower was the ability to generate sub-sonic bursts. She was killed by the Omnidroid v. X4.

=== Aspiring superheroes ===
The following are characters that aspire to be superheroes and appear in Incredibles 2:

- Karen (a.k.a. Voyd) (voiced by Sophia Bush) – A young Elastigirl fan who has the power of creating wormholes or warps for teleporting/displacing objects and people.
- Krushauer (voiced by Phil LaMarr) – An aspiring Super who has the power of telekinesis.
- He-Lectrix (voiced by Phil LaMarr) – An aspiring Super who has the power of controlling and projecting electrical currents.
- Gus Burns (a.k.a. Reflux) (voiced by Paul Eiding) – An elderly Super who can vomit lava.
- Concretia "Connie" Mason (a.k.a. Brick) (voiced by Deirdre Warin) – A brick-themed aspiring Super with superhuman strength and invulnerability.
- Screech (voiced by Dee Bradley Baker) – An owl-like aspiring Super who has the ability of flight and a supersonic screech.
