= Naziha =

Naziha is a feminine given name of Arabic origin. Notable people with the name include:

== Given name ==
- Naziha Syed Ali, Pakistani journalist
- Naziha Arebi (born 1984), Libyan-British director and producer
- Naziha Belkeziz (born 1968), Moroccan banker and Chairman and CEO at Banque Centrale Populaire
- Naziha al-Dulaimi (1923–2007), Iraqi feminist
- Nazihah Hanis (born 1997), Malaysian professional squash player
- Naziha Mestaoui (1975–2020), Belgian artist
- Naziha Réjiba, Tunisian journalist
- Naziha Salim (1927–2008), Iraqi artist, educator, and author
