= Kent Melton =

American animation sculptor (1955–2024)

- Born: 1955; Springfield, Missouri, U.S.
- Died: February 22, 2024 (aged 68); Stone County, Missouri, U.S.
- Occupation: Animation sculptor
- Notable work: The Lion King; The Incredibles; Aladdin
- Spouse: Martha Melton
- Children: 3

Kent Melton (1955 – February 22, 2024) was an American animation sculptor. He created sculptures and reference maquettes for The Walt Disney Company, Hanna-Barbera, and Warner Brothers.

== Early life ==
Born in 1955, Melton was the second of three children of an agriculture teacher in Springfield, Missouri. He lived in Aurora and Marionville during elementary school. He moved to Illinois after his father was hired for a teaching position there. Melton was raised on farms and never attended art school nor received any formal art training.

== Career ==
Melton left his job carving wood and cutting glass at an amusement park in Branson, Missouri and went to Los Angeles, where he worked at Hanna-Barbera as a staff sculptor, the first person to do so. He sculpted characters from The Flintstones, The Jetsons, and worked on The Completely Mental Misadventures of Ed Grimley. Melton created painted Beatles statues based on the TV cartoons. They have since been reproduced through the years. In addition to creating porcelain-based sculptures for the Walt Disney Classics Collection, Melton also freelanced for Warner Bros., making sculptures for Tiny Toons Adventures, before being hired by Disney. His credits include Aladdin (1992), Thumbelina (1994), The Lion King (1994), Pocahontas (1995), The Hunchback of Notre Dame (1996), Hercules (1997), Mulan (1998), The Prince of Egypt (1998), Tarzan (1999), The Road to El Dorado (2000), Atlantis: The Lost Empire (2001), Spirit: Stallion of the Cimarron (2002), The Incredibles (2004), Coraline (2009), Tangled (2010), ParaNorman (2012), and The Boxtrolls (2014). For Aladdin, Melton worked on the first computer-animated character ever made in an animated film. He is considered an important figure in the "Disney Animation Renaissance" of the 1990s. He was a featured artist at the 2018 Toonfest.

== Later life and death ==
Melton died from Lewy body dementia at his home in Stone County, Missouri, on February 22, 2024. He was married to Martha, with whom he had three children and four grandchildren.

== Gallery ==
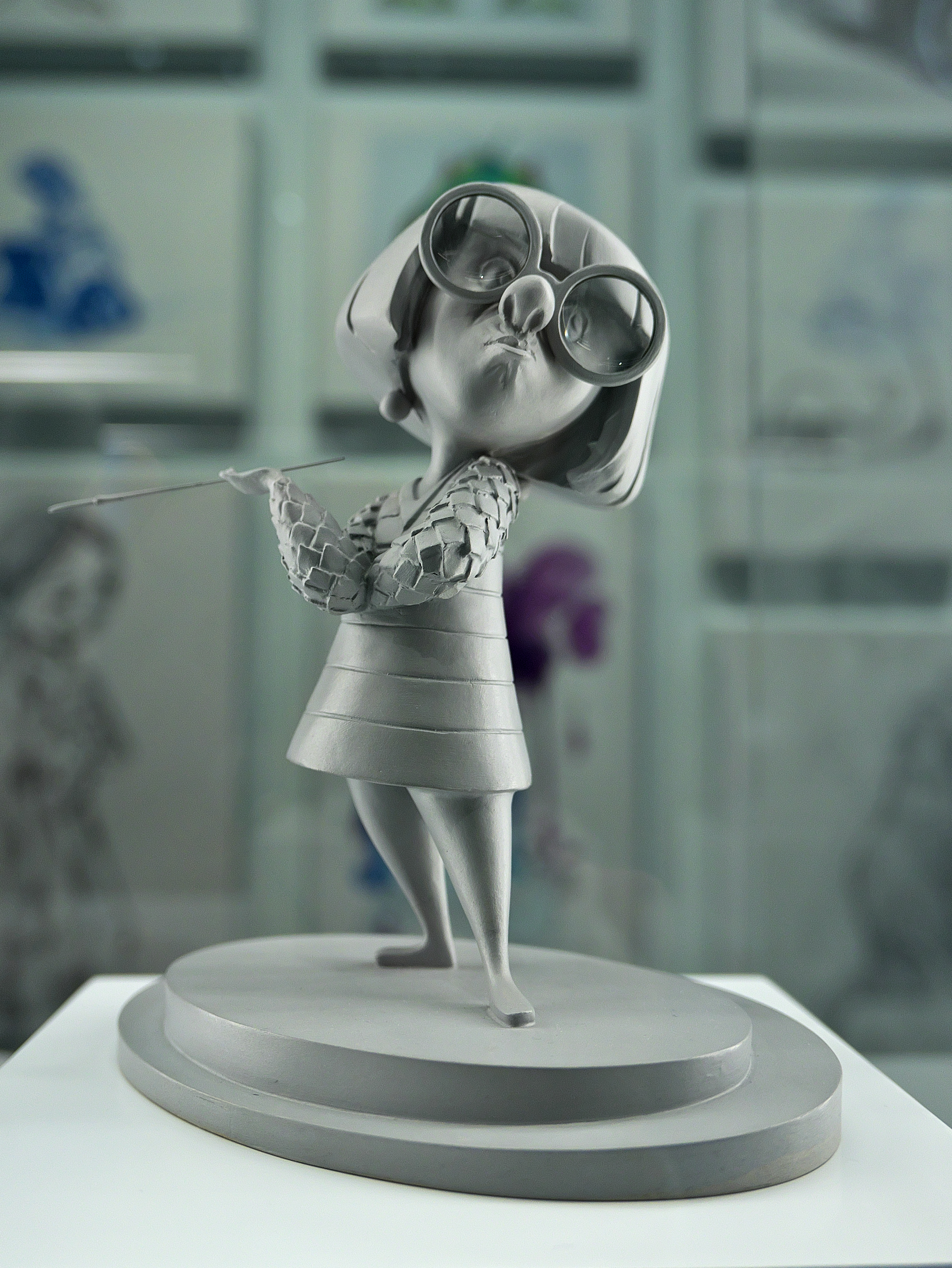
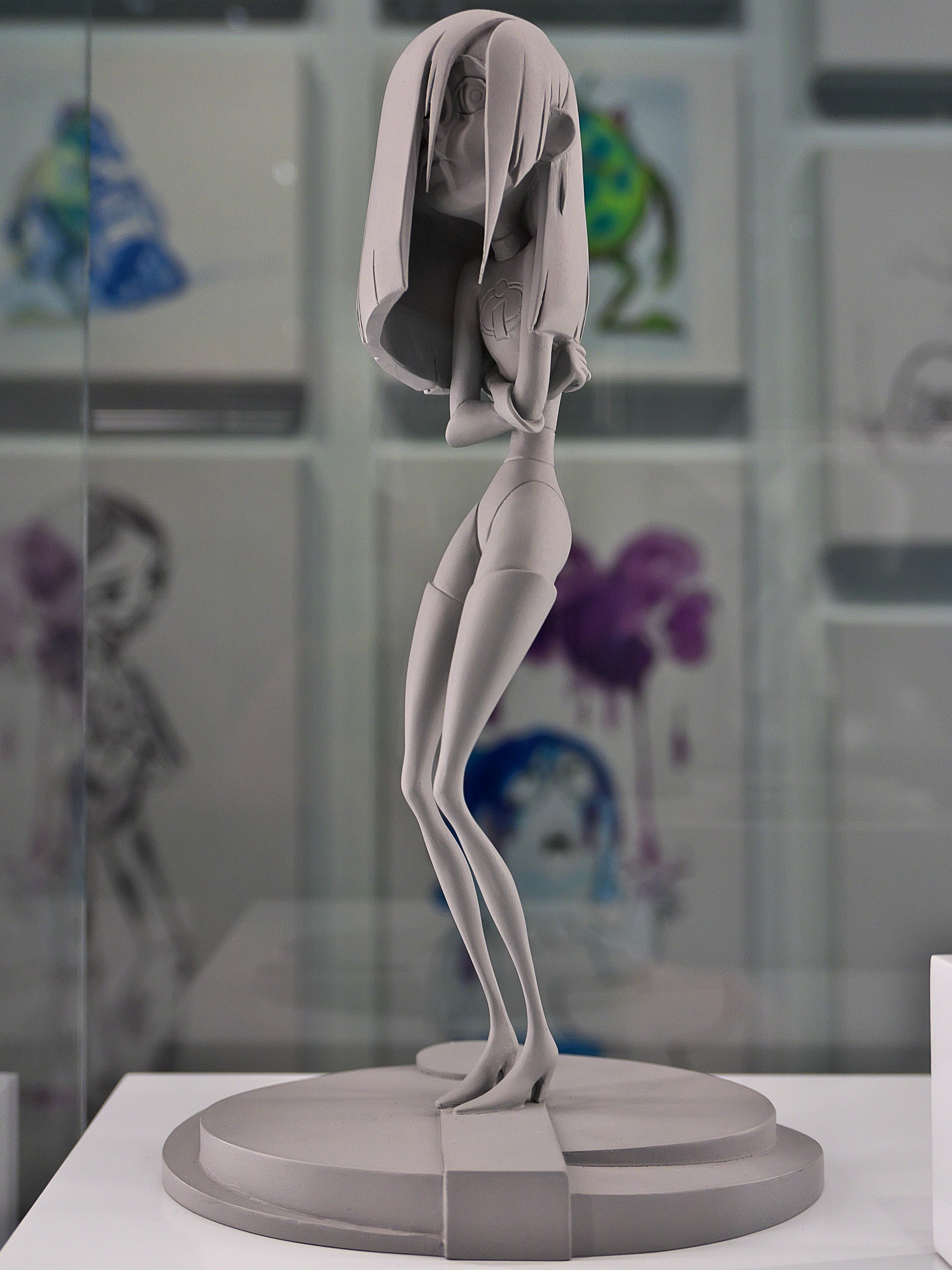
Edna Mode and Violet maquettes by Melton
