= Pascal Morand =

French business executive

Pascal Morand (born December 20, 1955, in Neuilly-sur-Seine) is the executive president of the Fédération française de la couture. He is also a professor at ESCP Business School, a member of Académie des Technologies (The National Academy of Technologies of France), a member of the Commission d'évaluation des formations et diplômes de gestation (The Commission for the Evaluation of Management Training and Degrees) and, a member of the Conseil national éducation-économie, an organization established by the French National Education Ministry to foster greater cooperation between business and higher education.

== Early life ==
Pascal Morand is the son of statistician engineer Joseph Morand and Françoise Grappin (known as Françoise Beucler). He graduated from HEC Paris in 1978 and obtained a postgraduate diploma (DEA) in organisational sciences from Paris-Dauphine University in 1979. In 1988, he earned a doctoral degree (Doctorat d’État) in economics from the University of Rouen, focusing on "bounded rationality and market economy," under the supervision of Christian de Boissieu.

== Career ==
Morand has focused his career teaching at the university level and fostering educational, professional and industrial ties between fashion and business. He began in education as a teaching assistant, then professor, of economics at the École supérieure de commerce de Rouen, Neoma, from 1978 to 1985. He was also a lecturer and teacher at the University of Paris 1 Panthéon-Sorbonne as well as at the HEC Business School from 1981 to 1987. In 1981, Morand was a visiting scholar at the Northwestern University in Chicago. From 1985 to 1987, he ran the post graduate degrees and international programs at ESCP Europe. Morand was the Director of the Institut Français de la Mode (IFM) from 1987 to 2006, and then Dean of ESCP Business School from 2006 to 2012. He was the Deputy Director General of the Chamber of Commerce and Industry of Paris Region from 2013 to 2015 in charge of studies, public affairs and policy.

Morand has been a member of the Board and then Director of the Centre textile de conjoncture et d’observation économique (CTCOE), a fashion and textile economic observatory, from 1992 to 1998, the year this institution merged with the Institut Français de la Mode; a member of the Board of the Union Française des Arts du Costume (UFAC) from 1992 à 2006; a member of the Board of the École nationale supérieure de création industrielle (ENSCI-Les Ateliers) from 2006 to 2011. Morand co-founded the Institute for innovation and competitiveness (i7) in 2009. In addition, he was president of the strategic advisory board of the Docks-Cité de la mode et du design from 2012 to 2014.

Morand expresses his own passion for creativity, fashion, design and innovation through writing and has penned numerous pieces on these subjects in addition to exploring the relationship between the business and culture. In particular, he published two books, one of which discussed the European economic and monetary union as a victory for Lutheranism and the other which explored the relationship between luxury and religions.

In his free time, Morand is a musician, singer-songwriter and interpreter.

== Public service ==
Morand has been active in the public sector and between 2000 and 2006, he led various French and European missions, notably for Christian Pierret, the Minister of Industry, and his successor Nicole Fontaine. One project led to the creation of the Cité de la mode et du design in Paris, located in Quai d'Austerlitz, in Paris. He also examined the consequences of the abolition of the multi-fiber agreements and the entry of China in the World Trade Organization on the fashion and textile industries.

Morand also led a Euro-mediterranean mission about the strategic repositioning of the Moroccan textile and apparel industry (2002–2003) in addition to completing several studies for the Moroccan government regarding tariff reform and the establishment of a design school (2003–2005)

Christine Lagarde, France's Economic Minister at the time, endorsed Morand with several missions about globalization innovation and the way to promote it and the impact of accounting standards on the economic crisis.

== Publications ==
- L’avenir d’une métaphore, (in collaboration with Alain Masson), Lectures, 1983.
- Le capitalisme hollywoodien et les mogols in Hollywood 1927-1941, la propagande par les rêves ou le triomphe du modèle américain (collective work under the direction of Alain Masson), Editions Autrement, Série Mémoires n°9, septembre 1991.
- Les stratégies d’implantation des groupes japonais dans la filière textile européenne, in collaboration with Thierry Noblot, Institut français de la mode, 1991.
- La transition vers la monnaie unique : les leçons de l’expérience européenne (collective work), ESCP & Université Argentine de l’Entreprise, 1996.
- Monnaie et Industrie in Repères Mode & Textile (collective work under the direction of Bruno Remaury), éditions IFM-, 1996.
- La victoire de Luther; essai sur l'Union économique et monétaire, Editions of the House of Human Sciences/Vivarium, 2001.
- Mondialisation et Régionalisation : le cas des industries du textile et de l’habillement (in collaboration with Michel Fouquin), Working document of the CEPII Centre d'études prospectives et d'informations internationales, n^{o} 2002–08, septembre 2002.
- La moda di Milano vista da Parigi in Moda a Milano, Stile e impresa nella città che cambia (collective work under the direction of Ampelio Bucci), Abitare Segesta Cataloghi, 2002.
- L’Argentine : du désastre au renouveau in Pour comprendre la crise argentine (collective work under the direction of Denis Rolland and Joëlle Chassin), Editions L’Harmattan, collection Horizons Amérique Latine, 2003.
- Les marchés du luxe après le 11 septembre in Repères Mode 2003 (collective work under the direction of Bruno Remaury), (Editions IFM-Regard Institut français de la mode, 2003).
- Quand la distribution impose ses règles, Sociétal, juillet 2004.
- Luxe, religions, cultures in Le luxe, essai sur la fabrique de l’ostentation (collective work under the direction of Olivier Assouly), IFM/Editions du Regard, 2004, réédition en 2012.
- La mondialisation et ses langages in Changement Social, n°9, L’Harmattan, 2006.
- Mondialisation : changeons de posture, La Documentation Française, 2007.
- Religion et consommation ostentatoire, Sociétal, juillet 2007.
- Pour une nouvelle vision de l’innovation (in collaboration with Delphine Manceau), La Documentation Française, 2009.
- Normes comptables et crise financière (in collaboration with Didier Marteau), La Documentation Française, 2010.
- Responsibility of Business Schools to train Leaders sensitive to Global Sustainability in Global Sustainability and the Responsibilities of Universities (collective work under the direction of Luc Weber and James Duderstadt), Economica, Glion Colloquium series n.7, 2012.
- Les religions et le luxe : l’éthique de la richesse d’Orient en Occident, Editions IFM - Editions du Regard, 2012.
- Le soft power culturel à l'heure de l'immatérialisme, Mode de recherche, n^{o} 19, Institut français de la mode, 2013.
- L'économie de la mode (in collaboration with Dominique Jacomet), Réalités industrielles, Les Annales des Mines, 2013.
- A few arguments in favor of a holistic approach to innovation in economics and management (in collaboration with Delphine Manceau), Journal of Innovation Economics and Management, 2014.
- L'impression 3D: porte d'entrée dans l'industrie du XXIème siècle (in collaboration with Joël Rosenberg et Dominique Turcq), CCI Paris Ile-de-France/Conseil général de l'armement, 2015.

== Awards and honors ==
- Chevalier in the French Legion of Honour (France)
- Chevalier in the Order of Merit (France)
- Chevalier in the Order of Arts and Letters (France)
- Commander in the order of the Ouissam Alaouite (Morocco)
- Montgolfier Prize of the Société d'encouragement pour l'industrie nationale
