= List of international prime ministerial trips made by Srettha Thavisin =

This is a list of international prime ministerial trips made by Srettha Thavisin, the 30th Prime Minister of Thailand from 22 August 2023 to 14 August 2024. Srettha Thavisin has made thirteen international trips to sixteen countries and dependencies during his premiership.

== Summary ==
The number of visits per country and dependency where Prime Minister Srettha travelled are:

- One: Cambodia, Brunei, Singapore, China, Saudi Arabia, Laos, Switzerland, Sri Lanka, Australia and Italy.
- Two: United States, Malaysia, Germany, France, Japan and Hong Kong.

== 2023 ==
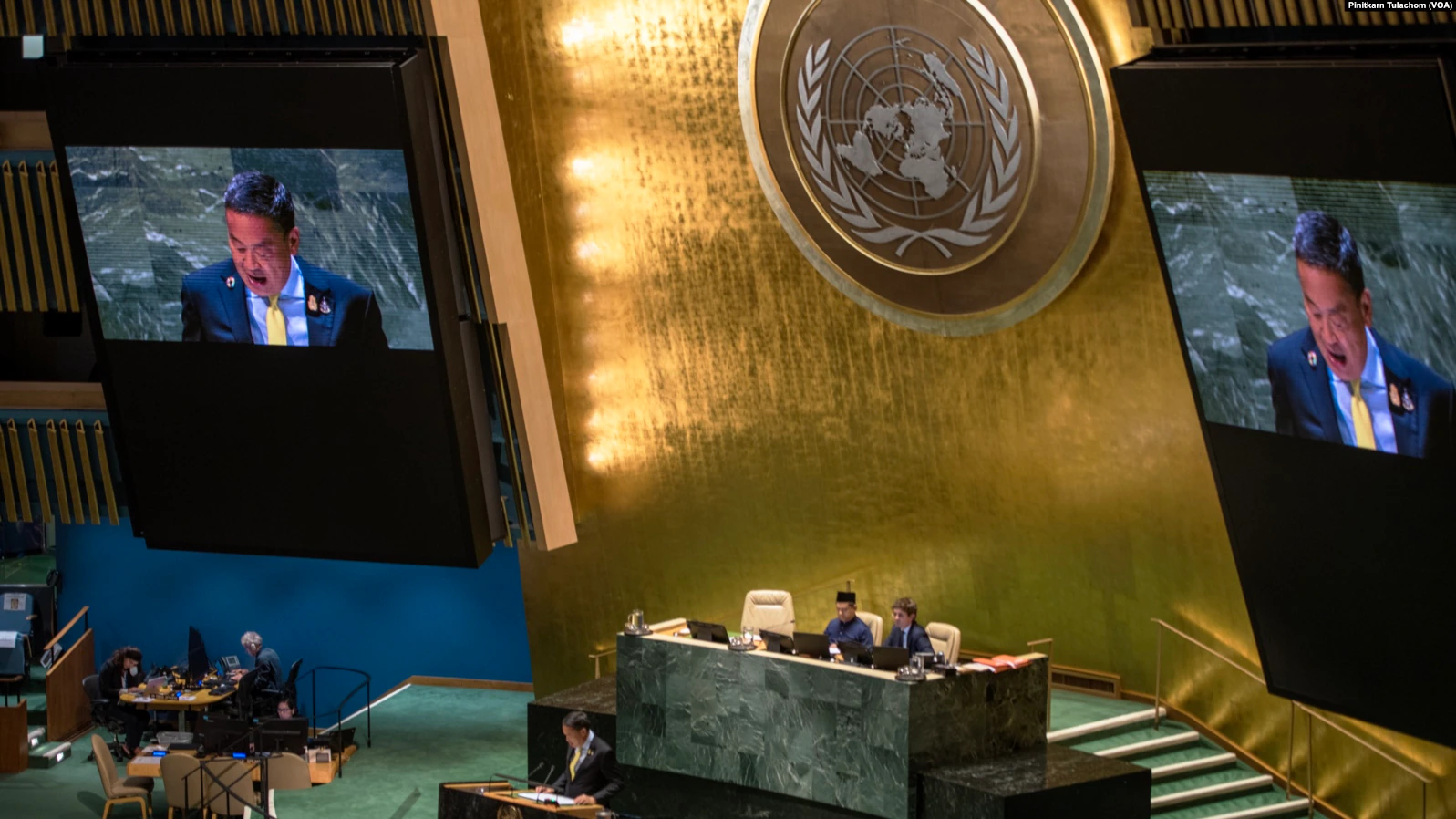
Srettha giving a speech at the Seventy-eighth session of the United Nations General Assembly in United Nations General Assembly Building, New York City, US, 22 September 2023

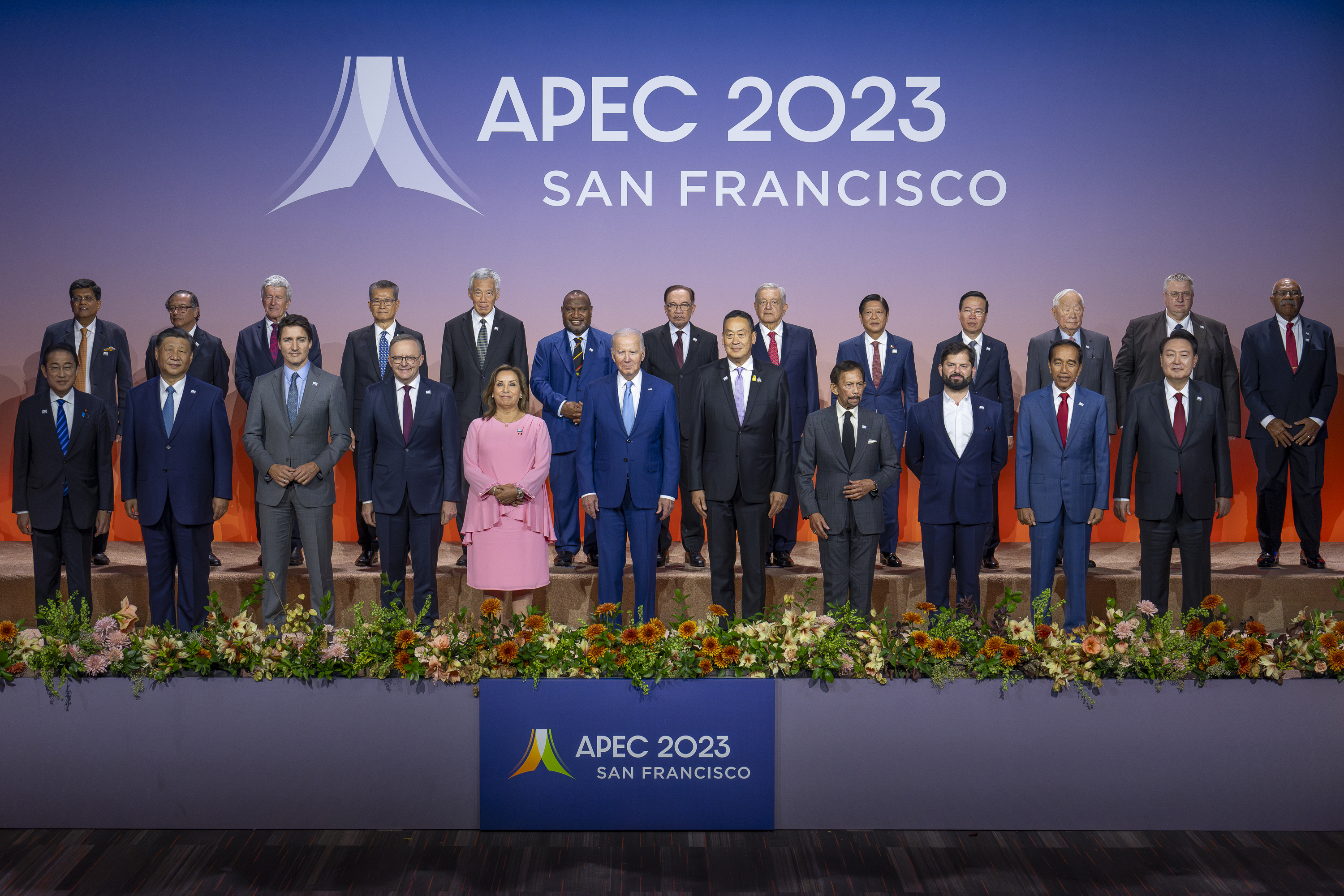
APEC 2023 leaders and guest leaders

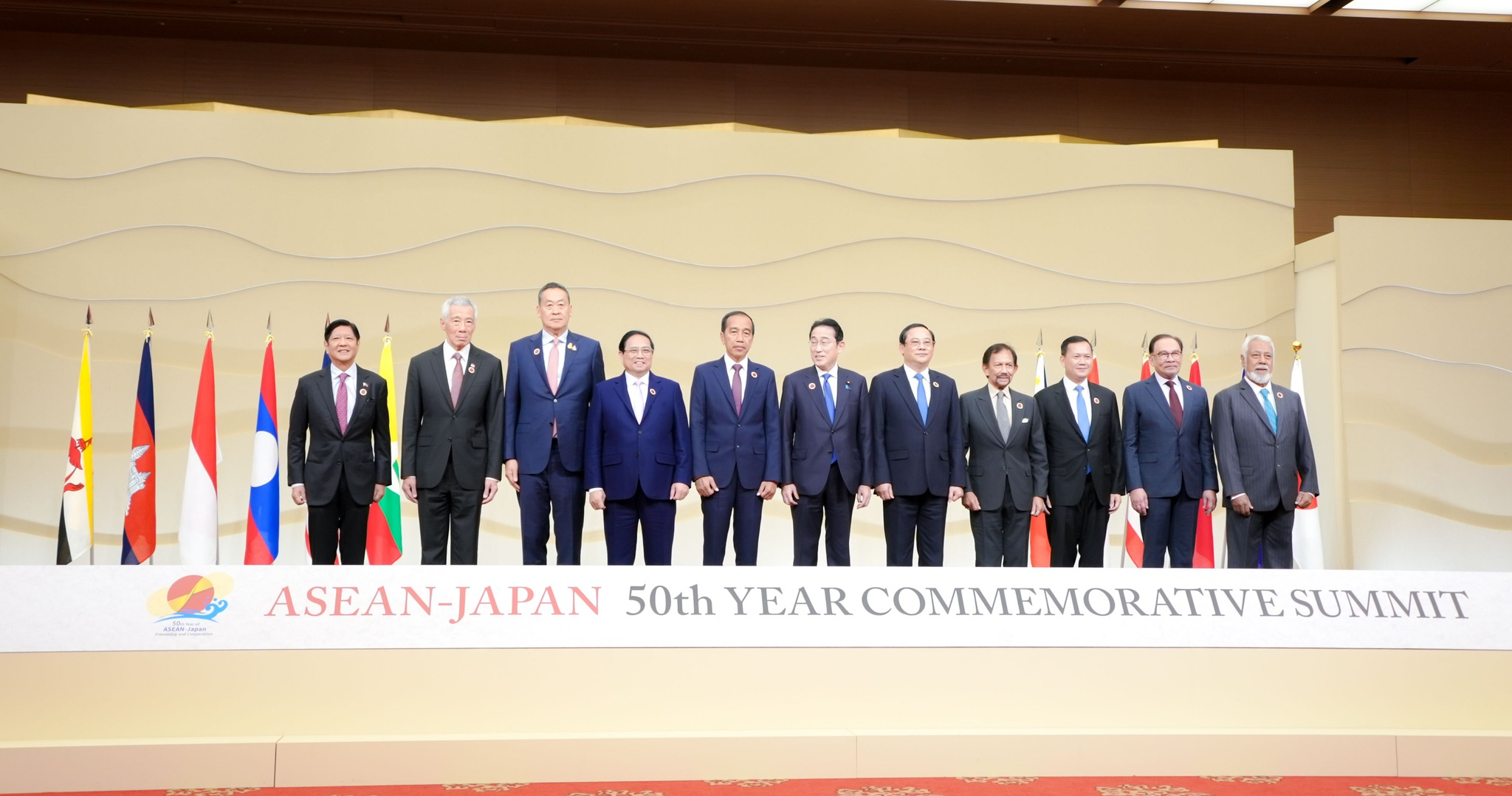
50th Year of the ASEAN–Japan Friendship Cooperation Summit leaders and guest leaders

#	Country	Location	Date	Details
1	United States	New York City	18–24 September	Working visit. Srettha attended the UNGA 78 where he met with UN Secretary-General António Guterres, US President Joe Biden, South Korean President Yoon Suk Yeol, Vietnamese Prime Minister Phạm Minh Chính, Estonian Prime Minister Kaja Kallas, Malaysian Prime Minister Anwar Ibrahim, FIFA President Gianni Infantino, J.P. Morgan & Co.'s chairman Jamie Dimon, Microsoft's vice-chairman Brad Smith, BlackRock's CEO Larry Fink, Tesla, Inc.'s CEO Elon Musk, and Alphabet Inc.'s CFO Ruth Porat. Srettha also made a visit to New York Stock Exchange.
2	Cambodia	Phnom Penh	28 September	Official visit. Invited by Prime Minister Hun Manet. Cambodia is Srettha's first trip to an ASEAN member state where he met with Prime Minister Hun Manet, President of the senate Say Chhum, President of the National Assembly Khuon Sudary, and Chairman of the Supreme Advisory Council Hun Sen.
3	Hong Kong	Hong Kong	9–10 October	Official visit. Invited by Chief Executive John Lee Ka-chiu where he meet with Chief Executive John Lee Ka-chiu.
3	Brunei	Bandar Seri Begawan	10–11 October	Official visit. Invited by Sultal Hassanal Bolkiah as Prime Minister of Brunei. Srettha's second trip to an ASEAN member state where he met with Sultal Hassanal Bolkiah.
3	Malaysia	Kuala Lumpur, Putrajaya	11–12 October	Official visit. Invited by Prime Minister Anwar Ibrahim. Malaysia is Srettha's third trip to an ASEAN member state where he met with Yang di-Pertuan Agong Abdullah, and Prime Minister Anwar Ibrahim.
3	Singapore	Singapore	12 October	Official visit. Invited by Prime Minister Lee Hsien Loong. Singapore is Srettha's fourth trip to an ASEAN member state where he met with President Tharman Shanmugaratnam, and Prime Minister Lee Hsien Loong.
4	China	Beijing	16–19 October	Official working visit. Srettha attended the 3rd Belt and Road Forum where he met with Russian President Vladimir Putin, CITIC Group's chairman Zhu Hexin, CRRC's chairman Sun Yongcai, Ping An Insurance's president Xie Yonglin, EVE Energy's chairman Liu Jincheng, Huawei's chairman Liang Hua, Alibaba International Digital commerce's CEO Fan Jiang, Geely's CEO Daniel li, Tencent's CEO Dowson Tong, and Xiaomi's CFO Alain Lam. Srettha also official travelled to meet with President Xi Jinping, Premier Li Qiang, and Chairman of the National People's Congress Zhao Leji
4	Saudi Arabia	Riyadh	19–21 October	Working visit. Srettha will attend the 1st ASEAN-GCC Summit where he met with Saudi Crown Prince Mohammed bin Salman.
5	Laos	Vientiane	29 October	Official visit. Invited by Prime Minister Sonexay Siphandone. Laos is Srettha's fifth trip to an ASEAN member state where he met with President Thongloun Sisoulith, Prime Minister Sonexay Siphandone, and President of the National Assembly Saysomphone Phomvihane. Also made a visit to the opening Khamsavath railway station.
6	United States	San Francisco, Stanford, Fremont	12–17 November	Working visit. Srettha attended the APEC United States 2023 where he met with Japanese Prime Minister Fumio Kishida, Canadian Prime Minister Justin Trudeau, Australian Prime Minister Anthony Albanese, United States Secretary of Commerce Gina Raimondo, Apple Inc.'s CEO Tim Cook, and TikTok's CEO Shou Zi Chew. Srettha also made a visit to Stanford University, and Tesla Fremont Factory.
7	Malaysia	Bukit Kayu Hitam	27 November	Working visit. Srettha travelled to explore the new Thailand–Malaysia border crossing point with Prime Minister Anwar Ibrahim.
8	Japan	Tokyo	14–18 December	Official working visit. Srettha attended the ASEAN–Japan Commemorative Summit where he met with Japanese Prime Minister Fumio Kishida, Japanese Minister of Economy, Trade and Industry Ken Saitō, Japan External Trade Organization's chairman Norihiko Ishiguro, Suzuki's president Toshihiro Suzuki, Honda's CEO Toshihiro Mibe, Mazda's CEO Masahiro Moro, Nissan's CEO Makoto Uchida, Mitsui & Co.'s chairman Tatsuo Yasunaga, Kubota's CEO Yuichi Kitao, and Panasonic's CEO Yuki Kusumi.

== 2024 ==
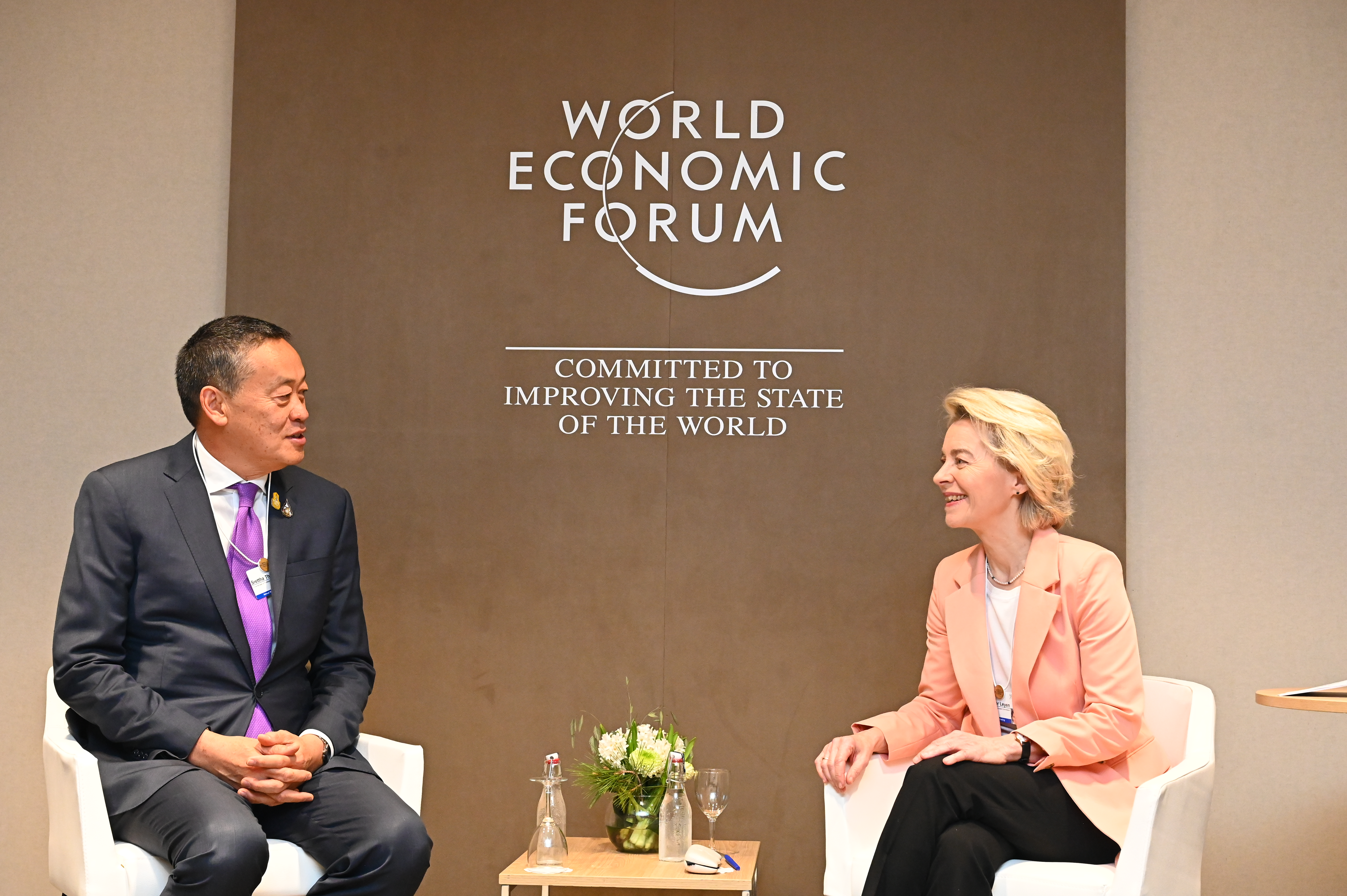
European Commission president Ursula von der Leyen with Srettha

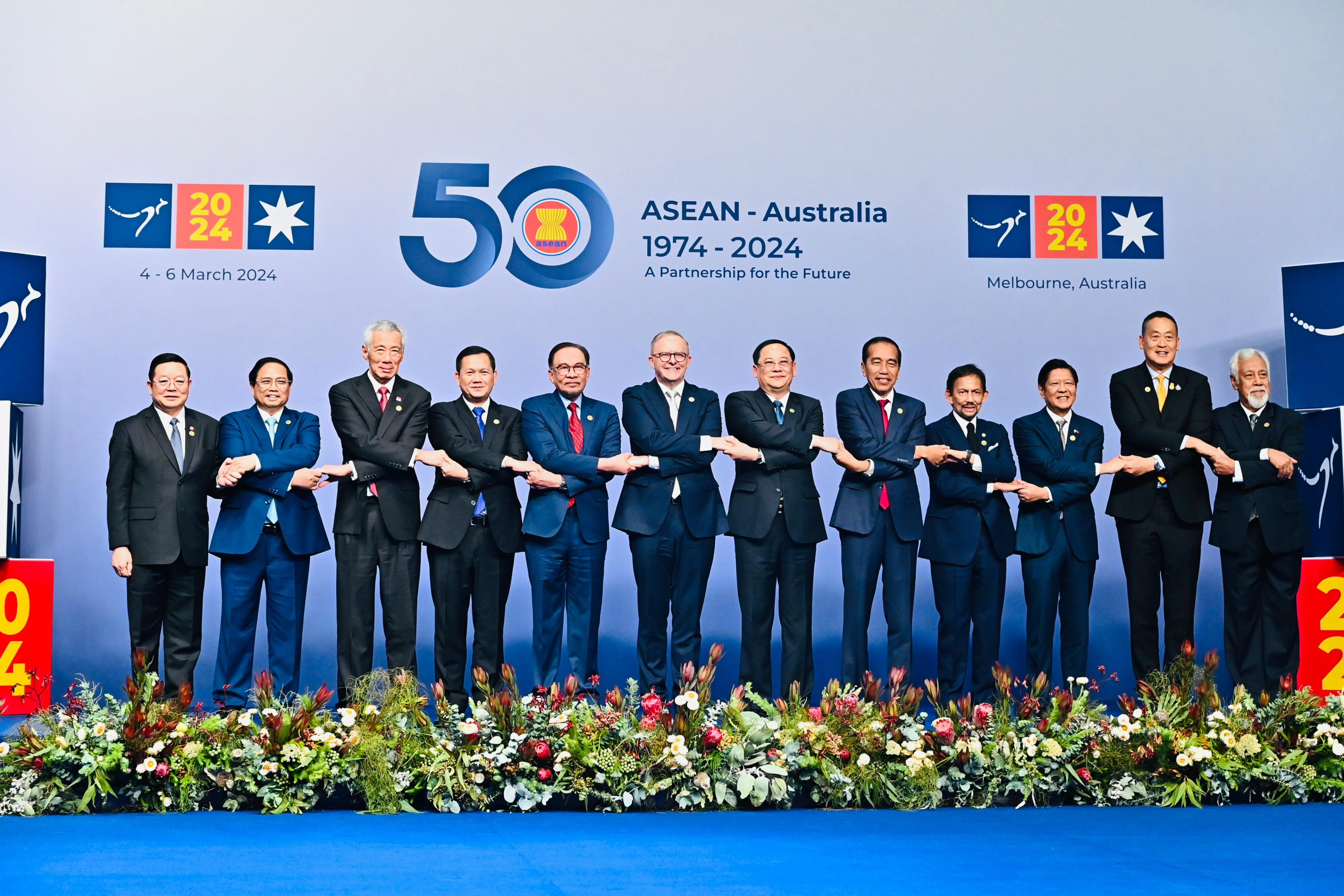
ASEAN-Australia leaders and guest leaders

#	Country	Location	Date	Details
9	Switzerland	Zürich, Davos	14–19 January	Working visit. Srettha attended the World Economic Forum 2024 where they pushed for foreign investment into the Chumpon-Ranong landbridge. In Davos, he met with Belgian prime minister Alexander De Croo, British former prime minister Tony Blair as owner of Tony Blair Institute for Global Change, Swiss president Viola Amherd, Cambodian prime minister Hun Manet, European Commission president Ursula von der Leyen, World Economic Forum chairman Klaus Schwab, DKSH's CEO Stefan Butz, DP World's chairman Sultan Ahmed bin Sulayem, PepsiCo's chairman Ramon Laguarta, The Coca-Cola Company's chairman James Quincey, Telenor's chair of the board Jens Petter Olsen, Saab AB's president Marcus Wallenberg, Nestlé's CEO Ulf Mark Schneider, and Robert Bosch's deputy chairman of the board of management Christian Fischer.
10	Sri Lanka	Colombo	3–4 February	Official and guest visit. Invited by President Ranil Wickremesinghe. And attended the 75th National Day of Sri Lanka ceremony.
11	Australia	Melbourne	4–6 March	Working visit. Srettha attend the ASEAN-Australia Special Summit marks 50 years of diplomatic relations. He also conducted bilateral talks with Malaysian prime minister Anwar Ibrahim, Lao prime minister Sonexay Siphandone, Australian prime minister Anthony Albanese, New Zealander prime minister Christopher Luxon, Fortescue's chairman Andrew Forrest, Linfox's chairman Peter Fox, Redflow's CEO Tim Harris, ANCA's CEO Martin Ripple, NextDC's CEO Craig Scroggie, and Hesta's CFA Dianne Sandoval.
11	Germany	Berlin	6–7 March	Working visit. Srettha attend the Internationale Tourismus-Börse Berlin 2024.
11	France	Paris	7–12 March	Official working visit. Invited by President Emmanuel Macron where he meet with Accor's CEO Sébastien Bazin, Fédération de la Haute Couture et de la Mode's president Pascal Morand, Michelin Guide's international Director Gwendal Poullennec, Comité Colbert's president Bénédicte Épinay, Valeo's CEO Christophe Périllat, Galeries Lafayette's general director Nicolas Houzé, Tang Frères's CEO Bounmy Rattanavan, Printemps's President Jean-Marc Bellaiche, LVMH's chairman Bernard Arnault, and Kering's CEO Jean-Marc Duplaix.
11	Germany	Berlin	12–14 March	Official visit. Invited by Chancellor Olaf Scholz.
12	France	Paris	15–17 May	Official working visit. To attend the Thailand-France Business Forum & Roundtable where he meet with President Emmanuel Macron.
12	Italy	Milan, Rome	17–22 May	Official visit. Invited by Prime Minister Giorgia Meloni.
12	Japan	Tokyo	22–24 May	Working visit. To attend the 29th Nikkei Forum where he meet with Malaysian Prime Minister Anwar Ibrahim.
13	Hong Kong	Hong Kong	29 May	Working visit. To attended the UBS Asian Investment Conference 2024

== Multilateral meetings ==
Srettha is scheduled to attend the following summits during his prime ministership:

Group	Year	
Group	2023	2024
UNGA	22 September, (United States) New York City	
EAS (ASEAN)	5–7 September, (Indonesia) Jakarta	
APEC	15–17 November, (United States) San Francisco	
COP	9–11 December, (United Arab Emirates) Dubai	
Others	BRF; 17–18 October, (China) Beijing	ASEAN-Australia; 5–6 March, (Australia) Melbourne
Others	ASEAN-GCC; 20 October, (Saudi Arabia) Riyadh	ASEAN-Australia; 5–6 March, (Australia) Melbourne
Others	ASEAN-Japan; 17 December, (Japan) Tokyo	ASEAN-Australia; 5–6 March, (Australia) Melbourne
██ = Did not attend

== See also ==
- Foreign relations of Thailand
