= WDCC =

WDCC may refer to:

- WDCC (FM), a radio station (90.5 FM) licensed to serve Sanford, North Carolina, United States
- Walt Disney Classics Collection
