= Naziha Mestaoui =

Belgian artist (1975–2020)

- نزيهة مستاوي
- Naziha Mestaoui
- Born: 1975; Brussels, Belgium
- Died: April 29, 2020 (aged 44–45)
- Education: La Cambre, Graz University of Technology
- Notable work: One heart, One tree
- Awards: Prix COAL (2014)
- Website: www.electronicshadow.org/nm/

External videos
- Naziha Mestaoui, au cœur du vivant (English subtitles), Lucia Wainberg
- “Naziha Mestaoui“, TEDxULB
- “Paris 2015 Interview with Naziha Mestaoui – 1Heart1Tree“, COP21 Hub Culture
- “1heart1tree Transformer la tour Eiffel en forêt virtuelle“ (French), TV5MONDE

Naziha Mestaoui (1975 – April 29, 2020) was a Belgian artist trained in architecture, who lived and worked in Paris. She worked both collectively (LAb(au), Electronic Shadow) and individually, and received awards in several countries. As an environmental artist and activist, she was best known for One Heart, One Tree at the United Nations Climate Conference (COP21) in December 2015. The participatory art installation supports reforestation on several continents.

Her work attempted to bridge "the virtual and reality, technology and nature, as well as what is visible and invisible."

== Early life and education ==
Mestaoui was born in 1975 in Brussels, Belgium, to a Tunisian father and a Belgian mother. Mestaoui trained as an architect. She did undergraduate work from 1993–96 at La Cambre in Brussels. From 1996-97 she studied at Graz University of Technology (T.U. Graz), working with Thom Mayne of Morphosis Architects.

She received a post-graduate diploma Architecte DPLG (Architecte diplômé par le gouvernement) from La Cambre in 1999.

== Collaborative works ==
=== LAb(au) ===
Mestaoui was a co-founder of LAb(au), an artists group in Brussels, Belgium which explored the impact of advanced technologies on art, from 1997 to 2000.

=== Electronic Shadow ===
Beginning in 2000, Naziha Mestaoui worked with Yacine Aït Kaci in the duo Electronic Shadow, pioneering and patenting techniques of videomapping in digital art.

They worked on a wide variety of projects including wearable computers (interactive i-skin) and immersive and interactive environments.

In works such as Warm and Cold, (2005) they used tactile sensors and chromic materials to develop haptic user interfaces in which people interact with images to control the surrounding space, transforming the boundaries between space and image.

Electronic Shadow has exhibited in galleries including the Museum of Modern Art in Manhattan, the Centre Georges Pompidou in Paris, and the Tokyo Metropolitan Museum of Photography.

At the Musée Granet in Aix-en-Provence in 2011, their solo exhibit drew more than 35,000 visitors. It was the first time that a Beaux-Arts museum had mounted an exhibition of digital artists.

They collaborated with choreographer and dancer Carolyn Carlson, in the creation of her work Double Vision (2006). The work is an hour-long solo dance, to ambient music composed by Nicolas de Zorzi. In the piece, Carlson wears a huge skirt of parachute silk that connects her to the stage. It becomes a screen for Electronic Shadow's light designs. A gigantic mirror above the stage provides a second viewpoint for the transformations happening onstage. The dancer's environment has been described as a "high-tech playground" filled with light and color.

For the 4th Biennale of Moscow in 2011, they worked with the musician 2square (Stephan Haeri of Télépopmusik) to create the interactive piece Chaos Theory. The work was presented at Galerie Iragui with the support of the French Embassy in Moscow.

Their permanent light installation Résonances was created as an interactive skin for the outside of the FRAC Centre in Orléans, France, which opened on September 14, 2013. As joint winners in the competition, they worked with architects Jakob + MacFarlane who created the prefabricated tubular structure known as The Turbulences. By placing diodes on the structural lines of the anodised aluminium casing, Mestaoui and Kaci created a real-time "interactive ‘veil of light'" that is responsive to local climate and environmental data.

== Independent projects ==
Naziha Mestaoui also worked independently. Her work was featured in a solo exhibition, Au-delà de l’invisible (Beyond the invisible), at Espace Krajcberg in Paris in 2014. Her works explored the place of humans in the world, both tribal and modern.

=== Echoing Bodies ===
The 2014 interactive installation Corps en résonance (Echoing bodies) generated sound and light displays in crystal bowls filled with water, in response to the movements of visitors. The installation was inspired in part by Tibetan singing bowls. As a bowl moves, it vibrates, moving the surface of the water and producing harmonic frequencies that can be both heard and seen.

=== One heart, One tree ===
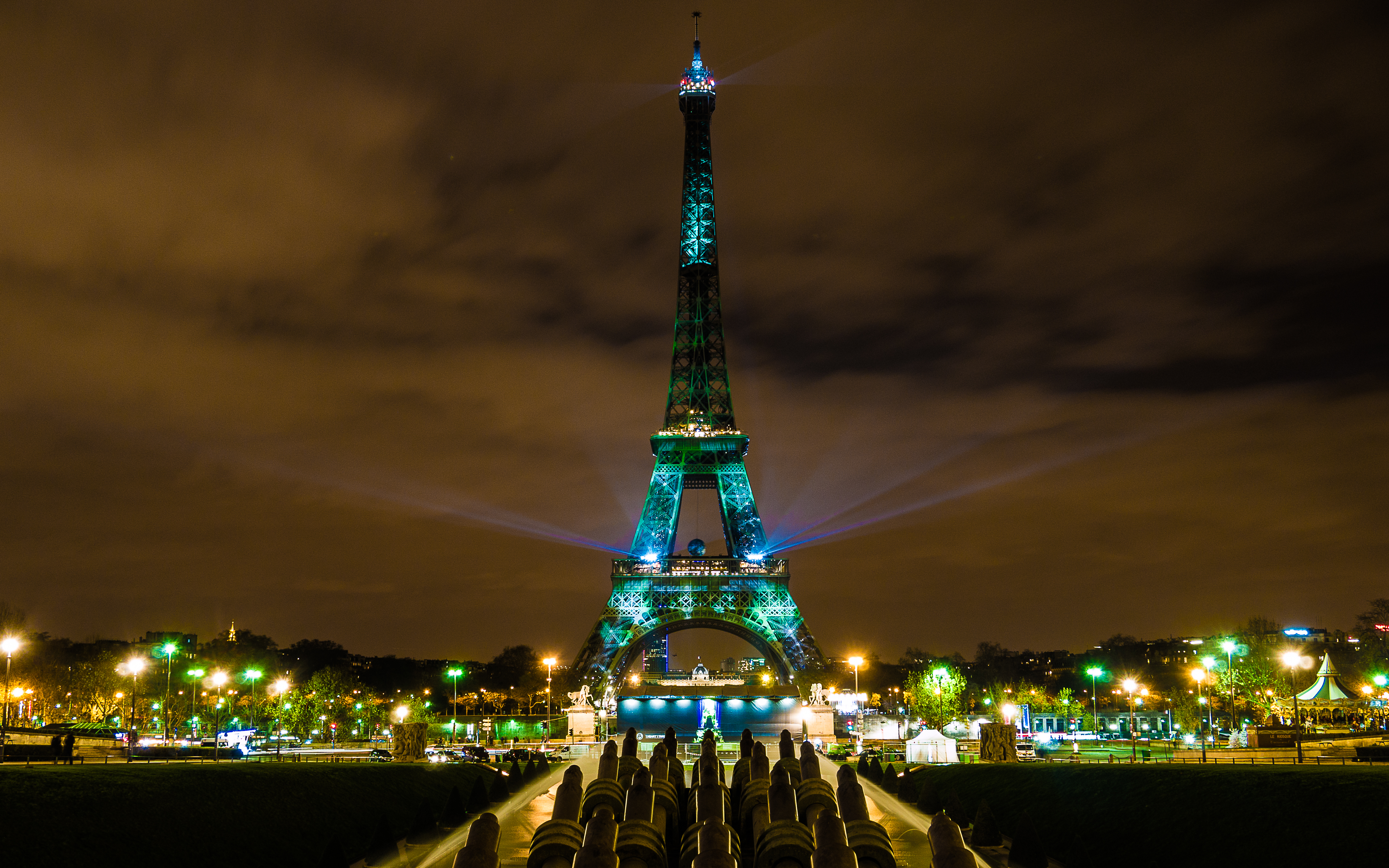
Eiffel Tower illuminated in green to show the "forest of light"

Naziha Mestaoui's light installation One heart, One tree was inspired by her experiences traveling among aboriginal peoples in the Amazon, India, and Oman. These include the Huni Kui and Ashaninka in Peru and Brazil. The project was crowdsourced through Kickstarter, and developed over a four-year period. An early version, entitled One Beat One Tree, was presented at the United Nations Conference on Sustainable Development (Rio+20) in 2012.

The images created as part of One heart, One tree were projected onto monuments in Paris during the United Nations Climate Conference (COP21) in December 2015. Buildings included the Eiffel Tower and the Hôtel de Ville, among others. Spectators used their smartphones to participate in creating the "forest of light", while listening to the music of Philip Sheppard. A heartbeat sensor on the smartphone gathered data that was used to generate a unique digital tree, that was then projected onto the building. 52,677 trees were created during the six days in which the participatory art project was displayed. For each computer-generated tree, a real tree will be planted, in Europe, Latin America, Africa or Asia, enabling participants in the art installation to also become participants in reforestation. The cost of planting is covered by the participants' donations (about $11 U.S.). Plans are underway to take the project to other cities around the world.

== Awards ==
- 2014, Prix COAL, art et environnement
- 2014, Prix du jury à La Biennale De L’UMAM pour l’oeuvre Corps en Résonance
- 2011, Talent de l’innovation, Prix du Centre de luxe et création (awarded to Electronic Shadow, with Yacine Aït Kaci)
- 2005, Japan Media Arts Festival, Jury selection prize in the Art division for the installation H2O
- 2005, Trophée Laval Virtual, Grand prize in the Category Architecture, Art and Culture for H2O
- 2004, Japan Media Arts Festival, Grand Prize, Art division for the installation 3 minutes
- 2004, Prix Ars Electronica, Honorary Mention in interactive art for 3 minutes
- 2004, Trophée Laval Virtual, Art and culture for the installation Ex-îles
- 1999, Prix de la Brique belge et Tech-art prize, prix de la chambre des ingénieurs flamands for Lightscape(s)
- 1997, 4ème prix, Concours d’urbanisme, Cultural capital Thessaloniki
