= LAb(au) =

LAb[au]
- Formation: 1997
- Location: Brussels, Belgium
- Coordinates: 50.85419°N 4.35186°E
- Members: digital art, electronic art
- Website: www.lab-au.com

LAb[au], laboratory for Art and Urbanism, is an artist group founded in 1997 in Brussels, Belgium. In their practice, the artists investigate the relationship between art and language through written words and other forms of coded language—semantics and signs—semiotics. Likewise, they take a linguistic approach, employing information and communication science in the field of art. Likewise, LAb[au] considers art an epistemology based on a linguistic approach, that further examines the influence of advanced technologies in the forms, methods, and content of art. Members are: Manuel Abendroth and Jérôme Decock. Former members were: co-founder Naziha Mestaoui (until 2000), Grégoire Verhaegen (until 2003), Pieter Heremans (until 2006), Alexandre Plennevaux (until 2009) and Els Vermang (until 2022).

From the name 'LAb[au]' one can read it as ‘LAB’ (standing for an experimental approach) or ‘BAU’ (ger. = construction / providing a link to Bauhaus The artist name plays on the difference between the phonetic and the written understanding, and as such underlines the group interest in the relation between art and language.

== Laboratory for Art and Urbanism ==
With a background in architecture its members and projects are concerned with the construct of ‘space’ and the way it can be planned, experienced, and conceptualised in the Information Age. The attention lies in the relation between architecture, light and advanced technologies.

The projects of LAb[au] deal with processes and systems based on different rules. This method is determined by the technological and artistic parameters and qualified by the artists as metadesign.

== MediaRuimte ==
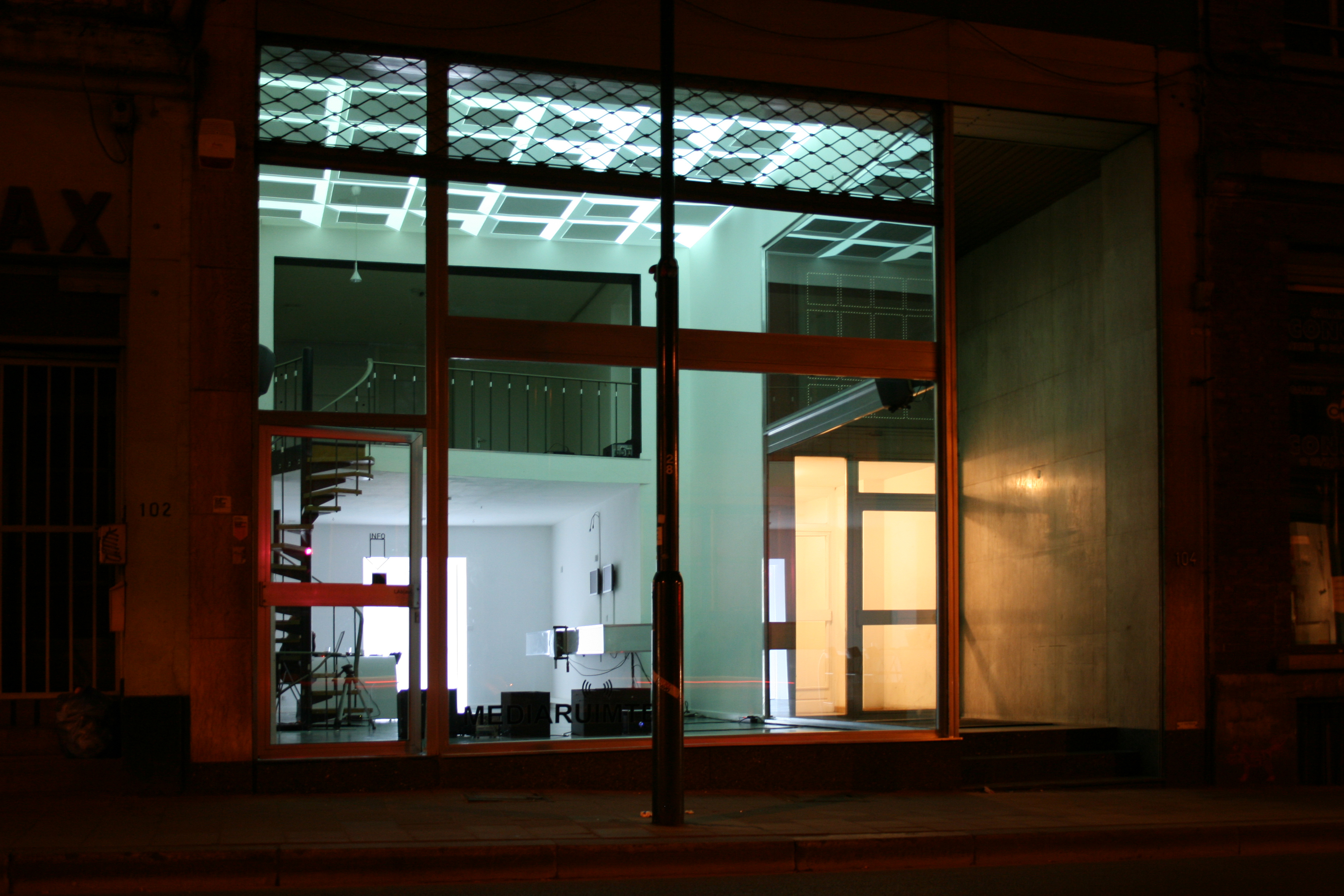
MediaRuimte gallery for electronic arts

The alliance between theory and practice motivated the group to found the gallery 'MediaRuimte' in the city centre of Brussels in 2003. The gallery stands for LAb[au]'s understanding as a collaborative art agency engaging in a trans-disciplinary work, being expressed through a program ranging not only over exhibitions, screenings and audiovisual performances, but also to conferences, artist-residencies and workshops. Featured artists range from Manfred Mohr to Nicolas Schöffer, Casey Reas, Limiteazero and Frank Bretschneider to Mika Vainio. The space closed in 2012.

== Société ==
In 2015 the members of LAb[au], Els Vermang and Manuel Abendroth, founded the exhibition platform Société to continue the experience of Mediaruimte, which closed in 2012. The new platform's focus was to examine the heritage of conceptual art on actual art practice through thematic group shows bringing both generations into dialogue. The exhibitions explored themes such as: Time, Measurements, Xerox art, and protocols, among many others.

== Solo-Shows ==
- 2024 : painting, writing, calculating, transcoding, Dan Galeria, Sao Paulo 09.08. - 05.10.24
- 2024 : POSSIBLES | PROBABLES, Botanique, Brussels, 29.05. - 04.08.24
- 2024 : FARBEN | FERNAB, Galerie La Patinoire Royale Bach, Brussels 21.05. - 28.07.24
- 2022 : Zeit Zeichen, Zeichen Zeit, Kunstmuseum Heidenheim 19.11.2022 - 26.02.2023
- 2020 : Ce mouvement qui deplace les lignes, Galerie La Patinoire Royale Bach, Brussels, 26.05 - 29.08.2020
- 2020 : yes, no: perhaps, Mario Mauroner Contemporary art, Vienna 18.01 - 21.03.2020
- 2019 : If Then Else, Casino Luxembourg Forum d’art contemporain, Luxembourg City, 27.09.-05.01.2020
- 2017 : Langage codé, Galerie Fontana, Amsterdam 04.11 - 18.02.2017
- 2016 : Langage codé, La Patinoire/Galerie Valérie Bach, Brussels 01.09 - 22.10.2016
- 2016 : Calculations, Permutations, Notations—The Mayor Gallery / Project Space Bermondsey, London, 13.01 - 31.01.2016
- 2015 : rouge, vert, bleu, blanc, Centre des arts d’Enghien-les-Bains, Paris, 09.04 - 28.06.2015
- 2014 : zéro | un - Galerie Denise René, Paris, 06.02 - 22.03.2014
- 2014 : writing, drawing, painting, DAM Gallery, Berlin, 31.01.-02.04.2014
- 2014 : binary waves, Le Centquatre in the context of the public art program, Paris 16.02 - 23.03.2014
- 2011 : Tessel, Musée de Moulage, Lyon 08.06 - 13.07.2011
- 2011 : framework f5x5x3 - Aubette, Ososphère Strassbourg 11.02 - 20.02.2011
- 2011 : diffraction, TAG institute, The Hague 07.12.2010 - 17.01.2011
- 2010 : m0t1v, Kunst-Station Sankt Peter, Cologne 08.01 - 12.02.2010
- 2009 : time | emit - DAM Gallery, Berlin 21.02 - 28.03.2009
- 2009 : fLUX - Galerie Roger Tator, Lyon 23.04 - 01.07.2009
- 2009 : m0t1v - Galerie Numeriscausa, Paris 30.04 - 06.06.2009
- 2008 : 16n framework f5x5x3 - Tschumi Pavillon, Groningen 18.12.2008 - 15.02.2009
- 2006 : space, 12m4s, Pierre Pergé, Le Grand Sablon, Brussels 07.09. - 17.09.2006
- 2005 : liquid space, Le Brakke Grond, Amsterdam 06.05 - 16.05.2005
- 2002 : eSPACE, Le Blac, Theatre Marni, Brussels, 17.05 - 26.05.2002
- 2000 : iSKIN, Musée de la Mode et du Textile, Le Louvre, Paris 10.10 - 29.10.2000

== Group exhibitions (selection) ==
- 2024 : Languages et Imaginaires, Gaité Lyrique, Paris, 02.09 - 06.09.24
- 2023 : The Seduction of the Bureaucrat, De Garage, Mechelen 12.03 – 04.05.2023
- 2023 : AXIOM#2, MAL ZEIT _ ZEIT MALEN, KBK, Brussels 11.02 – 26.02.23
- 2022 : The tallest towers start off the ground, DAN Galeria, São Paulo, 24.09 - 22.12.2022
- 2022 : On the Lockout, Fondation CAB, Brussels, 06.09.2022 – 06.01.2023
- 2022 : PEINTURE: OBSOLESCENCE DÉPROGRAMMÉE, Hospice Saint-Roch d'Issoudun 01.02 – 08.05.2022
- 2021 : X - FRAC des Pays de la Loire, Carquefou, 19.05 - 02.02.2022
- 2021 : Mika Vanio retrospective, KIASMA, Helsinki 20.8.2020–10.1.2021
- 2019 : Imaging Cities, Song Eun Art Space, Seoul, 25.03 - 08.06.2019
- 2019 : D’un soleil à l’autre, Base Sous-marine, Bordeaux 08.03 - 19.05.2019
- 2019 : Action <> Reaction, Kunsthal, Rotterdam 22.09.2018 - 20.01.2019
- 2018 : A Brave New World, MAAT, Lisbon, 22.10 - 28.10.2018
- 2018 : Untitled (monochrome), Richard Taittinger, New York 01.03 - 29.04.2018
- 2017 : Art Pavilion, Grand Palais World Exhibition, Astana 10.06 - 10.09.2017
- 2016 : Eutopia, Museum M, Leuven 20.10.2016 - 17.01.2017
- 2016 : Terminal P, La Panacée, Montpellier 17.06 - 28.08.2016
- 2016 : ACT, Asia Culture Center, Gwangju 25.11 - 31.07.16
- 2016 : Digital abstraction, Haus der elektronischen Künste, Basel 07.04 - 22.05.16
- 2016 : Exo-Evolution, ZKM, Karlsruhe 30.10 - 28.02.16
- 2014 : Physicality, Musée d’Art Contemporain, Montreal 23.05.-01.06.2014
- 2014 : Artist / Novelist, MOMA, New York, 08.01 - 31.03.2014
- 2014 : Noir et Blanc, Galerie Denise René, Paris 17.01 - 28.02.2014
- 2013 : Vasarely Hommage, Musée d’Ixelles, Brussels 17.10 - 19.01.2013
- 2013 : Poème Numérique, Atomium, Brussels, 22.06.-20.09.2013
- 2013 : space oddity, Le Grand Hornu CID, Hornu 18.11 - 10.03.2013
- 2013 : Noise, Biennale di Venezia, Venice, 30.05 - 20.09.2013
- 2012 : Artificial garden, Seoul Museum of Art, Seoul, 04.12 - 23.12.2012
- 2011 : Tender Buttons, Overpoort, Ghent 30.11 - 18.12.2011
- 2010 : West Arch, Ludwig Forum, Aachen 12.09 - 14.11.2010
- 2010 : From kinetic to digital art, Fondation Vasarely, Aix-en-Provenance, 02.06 - 11.07.2010
- 2010 : Digital Nights, Singapore Art Museum, Singapore 16.09 - 26.09.2010
- 2009 : Young Belgium Painters Award, Bozar, Brussels 25.06 - 13.09.2009
- 2009 : Holy Fire, iMAL, Brussels 18.04 - 30.04.2008
- 2008 : Emocao Art.ificial, Itau, Sao Paolo, 01.06 - 14.09.2008
- 2006 : Neo-beginners, TENT / Witte de With, Rotterdam 31.08 - 22.09.2006
- 2003 : Urban lab, Bauhaus Dessau, Dessau 10.10 - 18.10.2003
- 2003 : Polygone Den[c]ity, New Museum, New York 23.01 - 23.02.2003
- 2000 : La Beauté, Louvre, Paris 10.10 - 29.10.2000
- 1998 : transArchitectures 02 / 03, NAI, Netherlands Architecture Institute, Rotterdam 18.11 - 12.12.1998

== Public artworks ==
- 2028 : Source of Uncertainty, Podiumkunstengebouw, Leuven, Belgium
- 2026 : listen to the universe, RTT building Kortrijk, Belgium
- 2025 : fLUx, Union Station, Toronto, Canada
- 2024 : XXXXXXXX, Stadtbibliothek Heidenheim, Germany
- 2021 : Kontexte, crossover ‘Loredana Marchi‘ Brussels, Belgium
- 2019 : Zäit Wuert, Casino Luxembourg, Forum d’art contemporain, Luxembourg
- 2019 : Palimpsest, Wijkpark De Porre, Ghent, Belgium
- 2019 : 365, De Hoorn, Leuven, Belgium
- 2016 : 365, Quai 10 and La Vigie, Charleroi, Belgium
- 2016 : Lux Aeternae, AZF Mémorial, Toulouse, France
- 2014 : 10e-15, Centre de recherche Femto, Temis Science, Besançon, France
- 2014 : SiloScope, Quai Jules Guesde, Vitry-sur-Seine, Paris, France
- 2009 : mosaique 15x26, Maison de la Mécatronique, Annecy-le-Vieux, France

== Permanent artworks in semi-public collections ==
- 2021 : yes, no : perhaps - Hager Stiftung, Blieskastel, Germany
- 2017 : origamiSquare 59 squares - Linklaters, Madrid, Spain
- 2017 : origamiCeiling 160 Rhombi - Reynaerts, Duffel, Belgium
- 2017 : origamiCeiling 20 squares 54 kites - Cosnova, Frankfurt, Germany
- 2017 : origamiPenrose 71 kites and darts - Aegon Amersfoort, The Netherlands
- 2016 : origamiSquare 192 squares - Linklaters, Brussels, Belgium
- 2016 : SwarmDots - Fidelity, Luxembourg City, Luxembourg
- 2015 : chronoPrints - Zebrastraat, Ghent, Belgium
