= Les Abattoirs =

French museum and regional collection of contemporary art

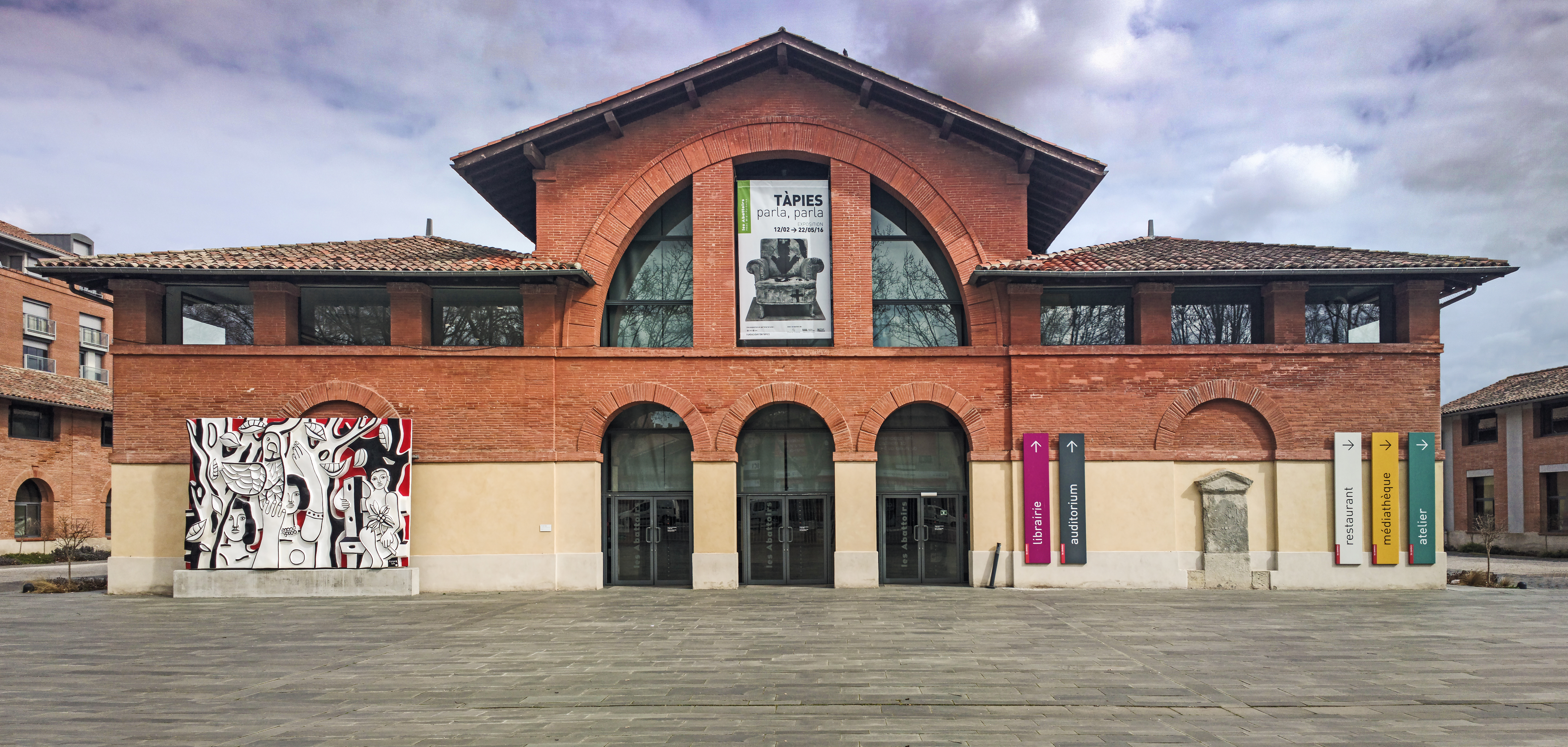
- Location: Toulouse, France
- Coordinates: 43°36′03″N 1°25′46″E
- Website: www.lesabattoirs.org
- Location of Les Abattoirs

Les Abattoirs, Musée – Frac Occitanie Toulouse (Occitan: Els Abatòris, Musèu – Frac Occitània Tolosa), combines a museum of modern and contemporary art (Musée) and a regional collection of contemporary art (Frac). It is located in the French Occitanie region, in the city of Toulouse. Les Abattoirs keep approximately 3,880 works and objects of all origins. Works of modern and contemporary art range for the oldest from 1934 (Alberto Magnelli) to 2020, for the most recent acquisitions (Teresa Margolles).

== History and organisation ==
The venue (whose name translates as the slaughterhouse) opened in 2000 in a former municipal slaughterhouse from 1823. It houses important works that were assembled from a specifically acquired collection and from several other existing collections, among which art collector Anthony Denney's donated collection, part of gallerist Daniel Cordier's donated collection, the former centre régional d'art contemporain de Labège collection and the former Frac Midi-Pyrénées collection. The museum's collection and the Frac's collection remain administratively separate.
