= Orange Cube =

Design showroom and Office building

- Le Cube Orange (French)
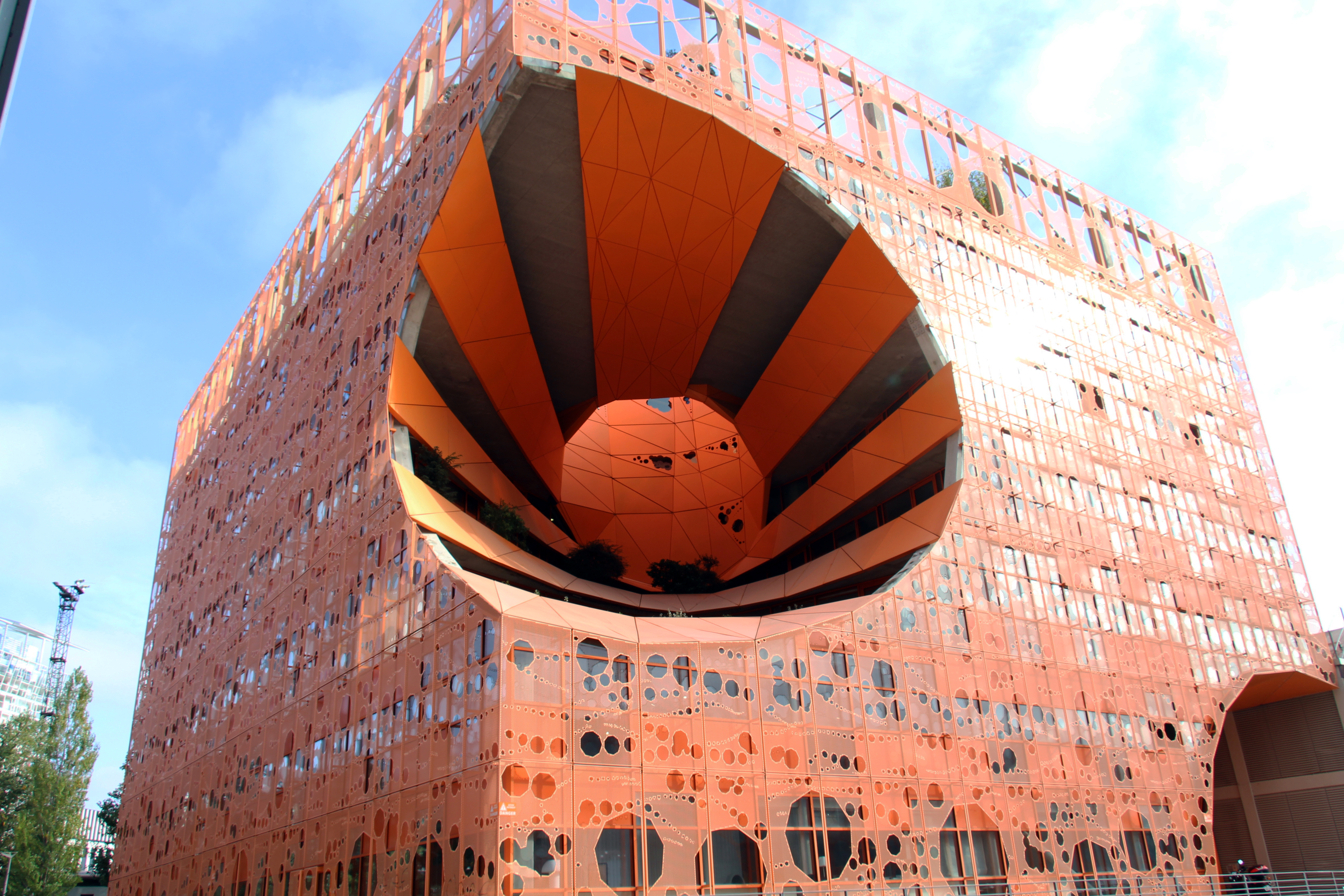
- The Orange Cube, viewed from the waterfront
- Alternative names: La Mimolette

General information
- Location: La Confluence quarter of 2nd arrondissement of Lyon
- Town or city: Lyon
- Country: France
- Coordinates: 45.73916°N 4.81459°E
- Completed: 2011
- Cost: €12 million

Design and construction
- Architecture firm: Jakob + Macfarlane

The Orange Cube is a design showroom and office building in the La Confluence quarter of the 2nd arrondissement of Lyon, France. Designed by the Paris-based architectural firm Jakob + MacFarlane, the building is best known for its orange color and hole-riddled cube shape, lending it the nickname "La Mimolette" after the similarly colored cheese. The Orange Cube was completed in 2011 at a cost of approximately €12 million, with a 6,284 m^{2} (67,640 sq ft) interior. It occupies a 29 m × 33 m (95 ft × 108 ft) footprint.

The building is the realization of Jakob + Macfarlane's winning design in a 2005 competition intended to create interest in the industrial Confluence area, one requirement of which was the inclusion of negative space; the building's two conical voids, as well as drawing in cool air, create, according to Architectural Record's Jenna M. McKnight, "an extraordinary dialogue with the river, almost bringing it inside." Others, including Telerama's Luc Le Chatelier and Valérie Disdier of the "Maison de l'architecture Rhône-Alpes" were more critical of the design. The Orange Cube's two facades are covered by twenty-five perforated, thermo-lacquered aluminum screens, all made locally.
