= Fonds régional d'art contemporain =

A Fonds régional d'art contemporain (Frac) is a public regional collection of contemporary art set in one of the metropolitan or overseas regions of France. There are currently 23 Fracs across the country, organised into a national network called Platform since 2005. Fracs are funded by regions, by the state through the Ministry of Culture and by municipalities. Originally without venues, Fracs are now hosted in repurposed historical buildings, or in purpose-built art museums, depending on the size of their collection.

== Founding and history ==
Fracs were founded by culture minister Jack Lang, as part of a decentralization policy to move aspects of governance out to regional governments. Starting in 1982, regional funds were set up to promote and support contemporary art by forming regional collections, and engaging in outreach to local communities and cultural institutions. For instance, it has often supported the creation of projects following the Protocol of the New patrons in France, developing over sixty artworks commissioned by local inhabitants.

The goals of the Frac program are:

- To build a heritage of contemporary art in French regions, and support the creation of new art through the combined actions of acquisitions and commissioning works. Each Frac may decide to specialize in a particular category of contemporary art.
- To disseminate funds widely within each region, developing regular partnerships with cultural institutions, local authorities and schools.
- To raise broad awareness in contemporary art methods, through tours, speakers, events with artists, and workshops with young people.

=== Next generation ===
Starting in 2011, the Frac next generation programme set out plans to build new physical museums for several of these collections:

- Bretagne (Rennes, designed by architect Odile Decq, opened July 6, 2012)
- Centre-Val de Loire (Orléans, designed by architects Jakob + MacFarlane, opened September 5, 2013)
- Franche-Comté (Besançon, designed by architect Kengo Kuma, opened April 6, 2013)
- Grand Large – Hauts-de-France (Dunkerque, designed by architects Lacaton et Vassal, opened November 16, 2013)
- Nouvelle-Aquitaine MÉCA (Bordeaux, designed by architects Bjarke Ingels Group (BIG) and FREAKS, opened June 28, 2019)
- Provence-Alpes-Côte d'Azur (Marseille, designed by architect Kengo Kuma, opened March 22, 2013)

== Frac collections ==
The 23 Frac collections, as of 2015:

Region	City	Name	Creation	Collection
Alsace	Sélestat	Frac Alsace	1982	1357 works, 489 artists
Aquitaine	Bordeaux	Frac Aquitaine	1982	330 artists, over 1000 works
Auvergne	Clermont-Ferrand	Frac Auvergne	1985	238 artistes
Bourgogne	Dijon	Frac Bourgogne	1984	650 works
Bretagne	Rennes	Frac Bretagne	1981	3928 works, 496 artists
Centre-Val de Loire	Orléans	Frac Centre-Val de Loire	1982	13424 works, 391 artists
Champagne-Ardenne	Reims	Frac Champagne-Ardenne	1984	680 works, 243 artists
Corse	Corte	Frac Corse		
Franche-Comté	Besançon	Frac Franche-Comté	1982	473 works, |255 artists
Île-de-France	Paris, 19th arrondissement	Le Plateau / Frac Ile-de-France		1347 works, 552 artists
Languedoc-Roussillon	Montpellier	Frac Languedoc-Roussillon		981 works, 372 artists
Limousin	Limoges	Frac Limousin	1982	1271 works, 311 artists
Lorraine	Metz	Frac Lorraine	1983	729 works, 277 artists
Midi-Pyrénées	Toulouse	Les Abattoirs, Musée - Frac Occitanie Toulouse		2332 works, 701 artists
Nord-Pas-de-Calais	Dunkerque	Frac Nord-Pas-de-Calais	1983	1272 works, 512 artists
Basse-Normandie	Caen	Frac Basse-Normandie	1983	979 works, |393 artists
Haute-Normandie	Sotteville-lès-Rouen	Frac Haute-Normandie		
Pays de la Loire	Carquefou	Frac des Pays de la Loire	1982	
Picardie	Amiens	Frac Picardie	1983	1538 works, 223 artists
Poitou-Charentes	Angoulême	Frac Poitou-Charentes	1983	801 works, 326 artists
Provence-Alpes-Côte d'Azur	Marseille	Frac Provence-Alpes-Côte d'Azur	1982	849 works, 389 artists
Rhône-Alpes	Villeurbanne	Institut d'art contemporain		
Martinique	Fort-de-France	Frac Martinique		
La Réunion	Saint-Denis	Frac Réunion		
