= Naziha Belkeziz =

Moroccan banker and CEO

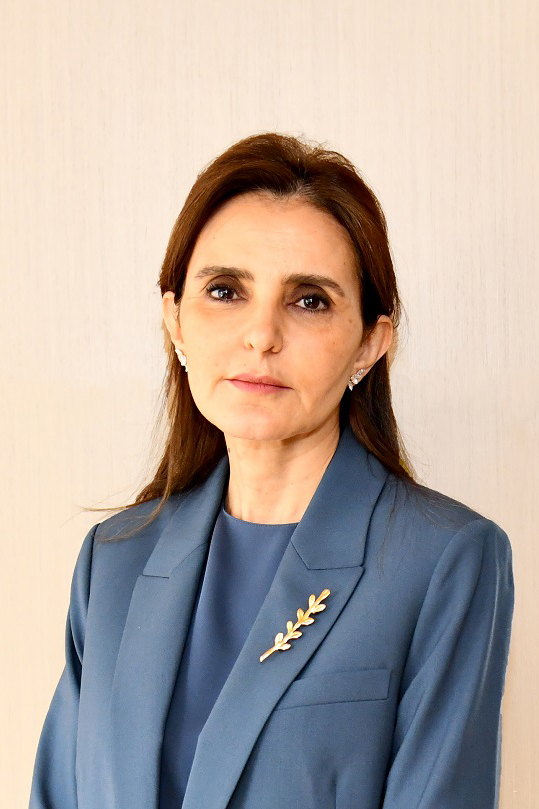
- Naziha Belkeziz in 2024
- Born: March 1968 (age 58); Rabat , Morocco
- Education: Paris Dauphine University, Conservatoire national des arts et métiers, Hassan II University of Casablanca
- Occupations: Banker, business executive
- Known for: CEO of Banque Centrale Populaire

Naziha Belkeziz is a Moroccan banker who is chairman and chief executive officer (CEO) at Banque Centrale Populaire SA and a treasurer and director at Education For Employment Maroc.

== Early life and education ==
Belkeziz was born in Rabat in 1968 to the Moroccan diplomat Moulay Abdallah Belkeziz, an ambassador to Tunisia and Algeria who held ministerial positions under the late King Hassan II.

Naziha Belkeziz earned her undergraduate degree in Management Sciences from Université Paris Dauphine-PSL and a graduate degree in accounting from the French engineering school Conservatoire National des Arts et Métiers. She received her doctorate in Morocco from Hassan II University of Casablanca.

== Career ==
In 1992, Belkeziz began her banking career at Banque Commerciale du Maroc.

Her earlier career positions included strategic roles at Attijariwafa Bank as chief economist and manager of marketing communications.

On 5 November 2024, the board of directors of the Banque Centrale Populaire (BCP) announced that Belkeziz was replacing the retiring CEO Mohamed Karim Mounir, making her the first woman to lead the banking group. Her previous position at BCP was as managing director of the Risk and Commitment Division.

Citing Belkeziz's more than 20 years of experience during "her rich and diverse career," the BCP Group said her responsibilities will include a focus on national economic financing and maintaining the bank's presence in 32 countries. She is tasked with boosting BCP's core businesses and leading future expansion especially in sub-Saharan Africa through its subsidiary Banque Atlantique.
