= Institut Français de la Mode =

French higher education institution

- Established: 1986; 40 years ago
- Affiliations: Conférence des Grandes écoles
- President: Sidney Toledano
- Rector: Xavier Romatet
- Location: Paris, France; 48.84122848510742°N 2.3688905239105225°E
- Campus: 34, quai d'Austerlitz 75013 Paris
- Website: ifmparis.fr
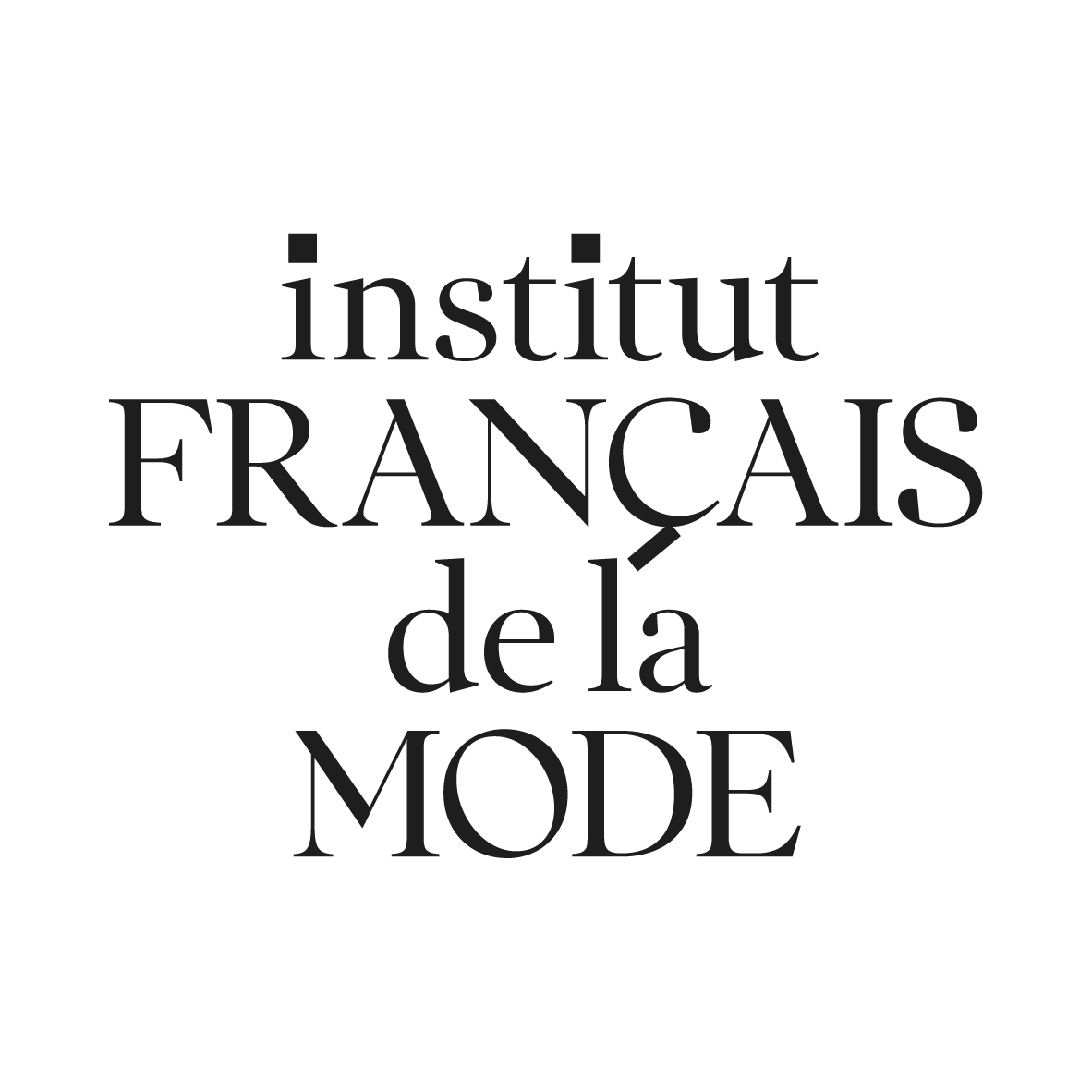

Institut Français de la Mode (IFM) (French for "French Institute of Fashion") is a higher education institution offering postgraduate courses and applied research for the fashion, luxury goods, design and textile industries, and creative industries more generally. In 2017, IFM was ranked number 1 worldwide for Fashion Business Masters programs, and number 2 worldwide for Fashion Design Masters programs by The Business of Fashion.

== History ==
In the early 1980s French authorities and representatives of the fashion industry suggested the creation of a fashion institute, aiming to train "the masterminds of couture and prêt-à-porter houses" as well as the textile industry. Jack Lang, Pierre Bergé, and heads of professional bodies and trade associations took up the issue.

Created in 1986 by the French Ministry of Industry and placed under its administrative supervision, IFM offers postgraduate education, executive education, research and expertise. Pierre Bergé, its founding Chairman, summarizes its mission in these words: "I have always believed there should be no barriers between the various joblines of our industry. I have always believed that you cannot do a good job if you don't understand those of others. In a nutshell, that people need to measure up, understand each other and work together".

In 1986, IFM created a Postgraduate Programme in Fashion, Design and Luxury Management in order to reinforce managerial skills within the industry. This programme aimed to promote the job of product manager for the fashion and luxuries industry, and leads to a variety of careers: supply management, marketing (of products and design in these industries), communications, sales, merchandising and distribution. Many senior managers and business leaders in the industry are alumni of this program. IFM's Postgraduate Programme in Fashion, Design and Luxury Management is recognised by the French Higher Education and Research Ministry for a period of six years. The degree is also registered by the French National Directory of Professional Certifications (level 1).

In 2000, the Fashion Design Postgraduate Program was created, as a way to strengthen links between management and design. This program, offered in English, offers three majors (Garment, Accessory, Image), and has attracted many talented people wishing to hone their creative skills in France. Selected designers are immersed in the business reality of partner companies, with whom they design prototypes (garments, shoes, leatherwork). Students hold an initial degree for fashion schools in France (école supérieure des arts appliqués Duperré, Studio Berçot, école de la chambre syndicale de la couture parisienne for haute couture, atelier Chardon Savard) and abroad such as Central Saint Martins College of art and design, Felicidad Duce, New York's Fashion Institute of Technology (FIT), Ecole nationale supérieure des arts visuels de La Cambre, or Antwerp's Royal Academy of Fine Arts. IFM's Fashion Design Postgraduate Programme is registered by the French National Directory of Professional Certifications (level 1).

As of September 2013 IFM offers another programme in English: the Master of Science in International Luxury Management (MSc Luxury). This programme is open to international students wishing to pursue an international career with French and European luxury companies.

Since 2009 Summer School programmes have been offered to non-specialized high school and college students in order to provide them with a basic picture of the culture of fashion and luxury, and an overview of creative industries in all of their dimensions: culture, joblines, economy, products, creative processes, image and communications.

Since 1987, IFM has been developing a range of executive education courses, with open-enrolment and custom-designed programs for companies (over 2,000 executives trained every year).

In 2004, an Executive MBA programme was launched in Global Fashion Management, compatible with a professional career or an entrepreneurial project, and with an international curriculum through partnerships with New York's Fashion Institute of Technology and Hong Kong Polytechnic University.

In 2024, the IFM launched the Executive MSc programme in Strategic Management of Fashion & Luxury—a hybrid, inquiry-based prgramme, designed for executives, managers and specialists looking to elevate their career, or transition into the industry. The programme is modular, allowing high-potential professionals the possibility of achieving a Masters-level diploma alongside working.

Since 1994 a large-scale scholarship scheme has been funded by a circle of patron companies, allowing IFM to encourage social diversity of its students. In 2015 this Circle of Patrons was made up of 16 companies and business foundations.

In 1999 IFM took on the Centre textile de conjoncture et d’observation économique, a specialized institution analysing production, consumption, distribution and international trade in the textile and garment industries. This institute for applied research and expertise became IFM's Economic Observatory, which produces and publishes market studies for business professionals in the industry.

IFM's Research department is also in charge of organizing a series of public conferences. Each year since 2009, it has co-ordinated a dozen conferences by academics and experts open to the general public.

== Activities ==
IFM programmes are open to holders of a higher education degree (levels M1 and M2), offering them specialized and vocational programs in the field of management and design. IFM alumni (2,000 in France and abroad) pursue careers in companies, or set up their own businesses.

As well as the humanities textbooks published by the Research department, IFM regularly produces business or market studies for business professionals.

== Networks and partnerships ==
The governing bodies of IFM Paris (Academic Affairs Council and Economic Affairs Council) are made up of senior managers and managing directors in the textile, fashion and design industries.

In 2013 IFM joined heSam (hautes études Sorbonne arts et métiers), an academic cluster for social sciences and humanities, engineering, private and public governance, design and heritage. This cluster is composed of universities and schools such as université Panthéon-Sorbonne (Paris 1), Conservatoire national des arts et métiers, école des hautes études en sciences sociales, ESCP Business School, ENA, and école nationale supérieure de création industrielle.

In 2006, IFM became a member of the Conférence des grandes écoles. Since 2011 IFM Paris has been officially recognized by the French state (decree published in the Official Bulletin for higher education and research, 14 July 2011).

In December 2008, IFM moved to new premises at the Docks, Cité de la mode et du design, quai d'Austerlitz in Paris.

IFM is a partner and organizer of an innovation network called R3iLab, promoting non-technological innovation for SMCs in the industry, in areas such as product design, marketing and sales. IFM's participation was supported and called for by the French Ministry of Industry.

IFM is also co-organizer, with the London College of Fashion, of European project WORTH, supported by the European Commission. This project promotes pan-European partnerships between designers and small- and mid-size companies, in order to develop innovative new fashion and lifestyle products.

== Structure and organization ==
=== Management ===
- President: André Beirnaert
- Dean: Dominique Jacomet (Xavier Romatet as of August 26, 2019)
- Executive Director: Sylvie Ebel

IFM is structured around 3 units:

- Education (executive education, postgraduate education, Executive MBA, programs for entrepreneurs, PhD)
- Expertise (Economic Observatory, market studies, publications and academic events)
- Information (library, internet and social media)

== See also ==
- Fashion design
