= Jakob + MacFarlane =

French architecture firm founded in 1998

The Orange Cube

Cité de la mode et du design

FRAC Centre

Jakob + MacFarlane is a French architecture firm founded in 1998 by Dominique Jakob and Brendan MacFarlane. It is headquartered in Paris.

== History ==
Dominique Jakob was born on 26 August 1966 in Paris, France. She studied at École d’architecture de Paris-Villemin (now known as École nationale supérieure d'architecture de Paris-Val de Seine) and graduated in 1991.

Brendan MacFarlane was born on 13 September 1961 in Christchurch, New Zealand. He graduated from the Southern California Institute of Architecture in 1984 and from the Graduate School of Design at Harvard University in 1990.

In 1998 they founded Jakob + MacFarlane in Paris. In January 2001, they were one of 25 mostly-young architecture firms selected to participate in the first exhibition of architecture facilitated by computer-aided design. Later in 2001, The Guardian noted their design of a restaurant atop the Centre Pompidou, for which the pair "beat Philippe Starck in the design competition", with a design likened to "the Bilbao Guggenheim, only rounder and shrunk".

In 2002, following the destruction of the World Trade Center in the September 11 attacks the previous year, the firm proposed that the site be "turned into a new World Peace Center, dominated by sinuous red and green towers that curve into the sky like twisting blades of grass". The pair later criticized the conduct of the World Trade Center Site Memorial Competition held to select a design for the rebuilding of the site, saying that "architects from around the world never really got what was at stake at Ground Zero", with proposals failing to focus on the improving the lives of people, and that "our profession gave the worst kind of response.

In 2007, the firm won the Globe de Cristal Award for best architect. In 2019, Jakob herself won the "Woman Architect Prize". The pair have also lectured as visiting professors in various European architecture programs.

== Significant projects ==
Significant projects include:

- New campus of the French University of Egypt in El Shorouk, Cairo (in progress).
- Connected House in Boulogne-Billancourt.
- Biomedical research center Méary (Paris Diderot University - Saint-Louis Hospital) in Paris
- Nadia et Lili Boulanger music and dance conservatory in Noisy-le-Sec.
- Boutique Editions de Parfums Frédéric Malle in Paris.
- Global headquarters of Euronews TV in Lyon.
- Orange Cube in Lyon.
- The Docks - Cité de la mode et du design in Paris.
- FRAC Centre in the Centre-Val de Loire region, France.
- New building for the Fonds régional d'art contemporain of the Centre-Val de Loire Region in Orléans.
- Restaurant Le Georges atop the Centre Pompidou.

== Exhibitions ==
- Venice Biennale of Architecture, 2008.
- School Gallery, Paris, 2014.
- Architekturforum Aedes, Berlin, 2017.
