= Cité de la mode et du design =

Building in Paris, France

Coordinates: 48°50′28″N 2°22′11″E

The Cité de la mode et du design on the Seine

The Cité de la mode et du design (City of Fashion and Design) is a building located at the site of the old general storehouses on the Quai d'Austerlitz in the 13th arrondissement of Paris, France. The public opening, originally scheduled for early 2008, took place in 2010.

IFM Paris (Institut Français de la Mode) has been located in the building since 2008. Art Ludique, a museum of exhibitions of contemporary art in comic books, manga, cinema, live animation and videogames, was also located in the building but left in 2019.

Located beside the Seine, between the Gare d'Austerlitz and the Bibliothèque nationale de France, The City of Fashion and Design was designed by architects Jakob + MacFarlane and is one of the most remarkable contemporary monuments of Paris with its bold architecture.^{according to?}
