= Naziha Syed Ali =

Pakistani investigative journalist

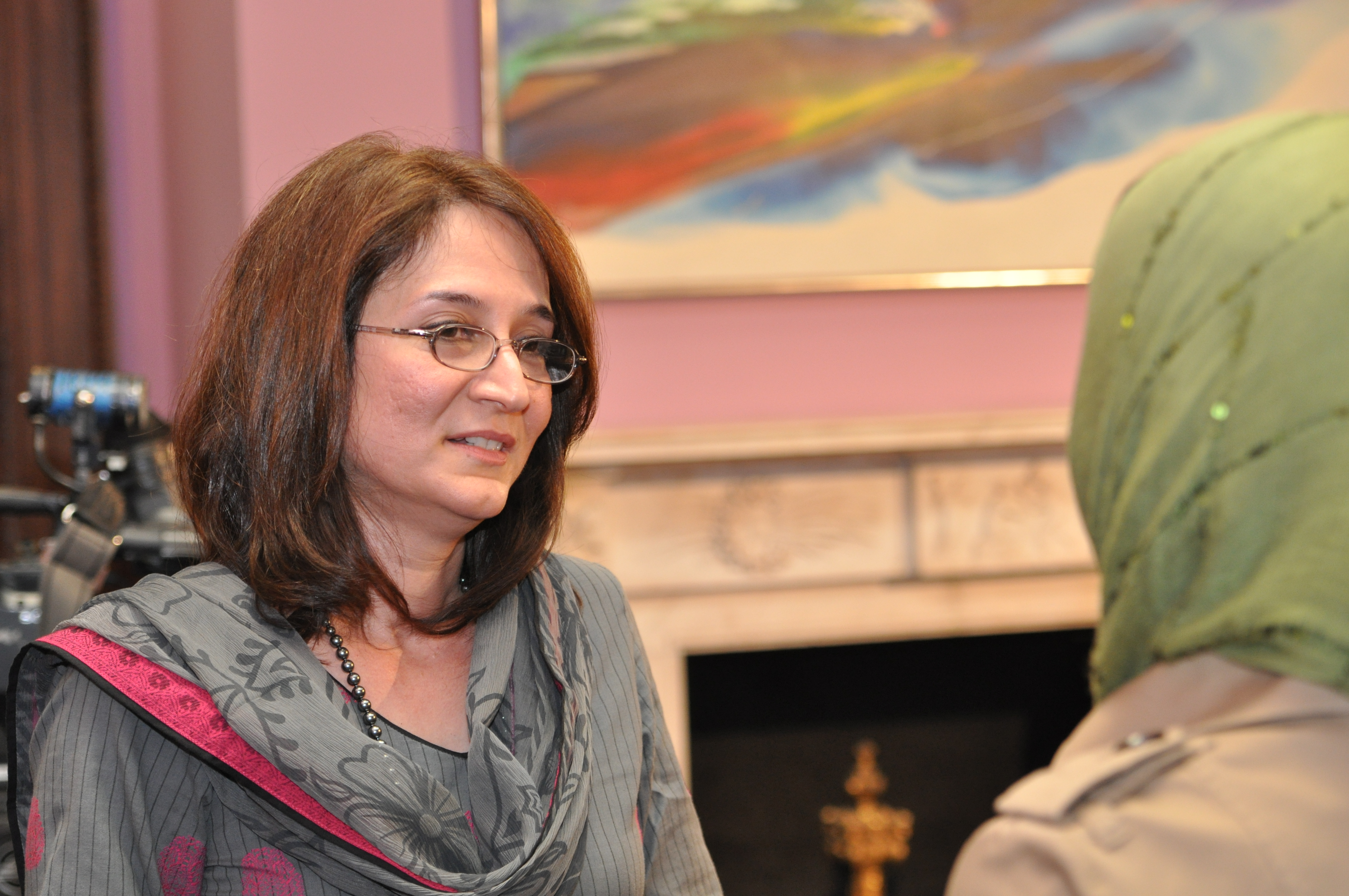
- Naziha Syed Ali in 2012
- Occupation: Journalist
- Known for: Investigative reporting

Naziha Syed Ali is a Pakistani investigative journalist who is an Assistant Editor at Dawn, she has carried out investigation into real estate corruption, police involvement in encounter killings and enforced conversion to Islam. In 2020 she was the subject of a half-hour profile by Owen Bennett-Jones on the BBC World Service.

In 2016, Naziha Syed Ali reported on collusion between Board of Revenue, Sindh, Malir Development Authority, the district administration and police to acquire land to complete Bahria Town Karachi, a privately owned gated suburb. In 2019 she returned to the story to expose the way in which the real estate developer had continued to extend its reach. She has also investigated the 'land mafia' in Karachi. Syed Ali has also reported for Newsline Magazine and Channel Four News (UK).

== Works ==
=== Articles ===
- (with Fahim Zaman) "Bahria Town Karachi: Greed unlimited". Dawn. 18 April 2016.
- (with Fahim Zaman) "The DHA City juggernaut rolls on in the name of development". Dawn. 18 December 2017.
- "Dawn Investigations: The shaky foundations of ASF Arabian Vista". Dawn. 4 February 2019.
- "Bahria Town Karachi: Greed unbound". Dawn. 28 September 2019.
- "The land mafia's rackets: A disaster foretold". Dawn. 14 September 2019.

=== Documentary films ===
- The miseducation of Pakistan, 2007
- Among the believers, 2016
