= Art Ludique =

Coordinates: 48.8405°N 2.3703°E

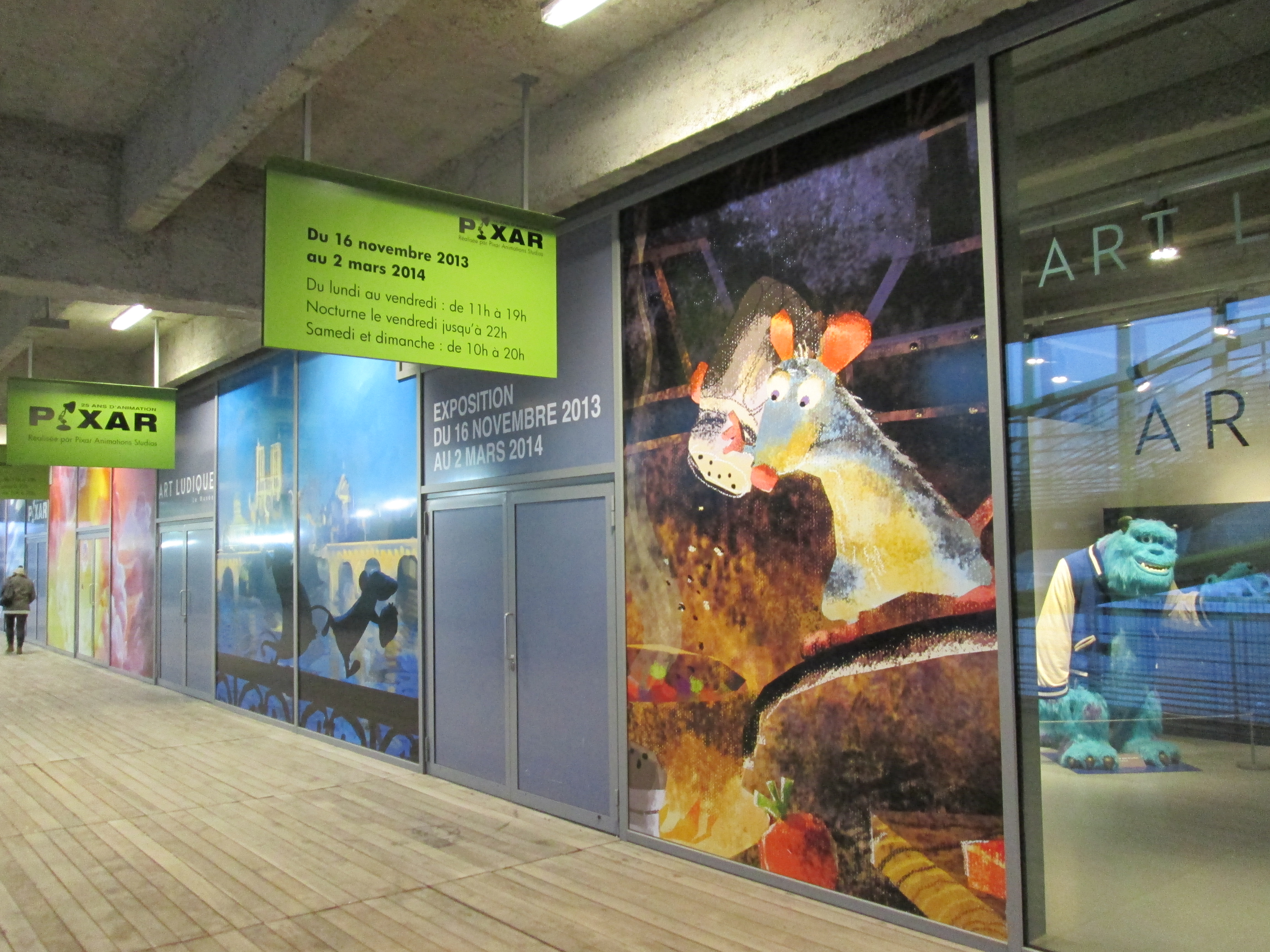
- The Museum, during the Pixar Exhibition.
- Established: 16 November 2013
- Location: 13th arrondissement of Paris, France
- Type: Museum
- Founder: Jean-Jacques Launier

Art Ludique – The Museum is a 1,200 m^{2} museum in the 13th arrondissement of Paris, France, formerly housed in Les Docks, cité de la mode et du design and inaugurated on 16 November 2013. As of September 2024, the museum is still looking for a permanent home after having left Les Docks in 2017.

== Creation ==
Jean-Jacques Launier founded the Arludik gallery, now run by his wife Diane Launier, before organising an exhibition of works by Moebius and Miyazaki at the Monnaie de Paris in 2004, followed by exhibitions on the art of Ice Age and of John Howe created for The Lord of the Rings. He has also written theoretical studies such as “Art Ludique”, published by Sonatine in 2011, and later decided to found a museum dedicated to contemporary art arising from the entertainment industry.

== Description ==
The museum holds several temporary exhibitions each year. A permanent collection is also being prepared, bringing together the most influential figurative narrative artists of the last few centuries, as well as contemporary artists from around the globe working in comic books, manga, cinema, live animation and videogames around a shared concept: ‘art ludique’. The museum opened with the exhibition “Pixar – 25 years of animation”, created in 2006 by Pixar and the MoMA, before hosting exhibitions dedicated to Marvel Superheroes and to Studio Ghibli's productions.

== Exhibitions ==
• Pixar – 25 years of animation: Art Ludique – The Museum was inaugurated with the exhibition "Pixar – 25 years of animation". Co-created by Pixar and the New York Museum of Modern Art in 2006, the exhibition opened in Paris on 16 November 2013 after having visited London, Tokyo, Helsinki and Mexico (amongst others). The exhibition brings together over 500 artworks (drawings, sculptures, storyboards...) and two attractions: the Toy Story Zootrope created for the exhibition that gives an illusion of movement, and the Artscape, an immersive panoramic animated film. The exhibition saw over 180,000 visitors.

• The Art of the Marvel Superheroes: this exhibition created for and by the museum opened its doors on 22 March 2014 with 300 pieces of original artwork, featuring the most famous superheroes from the Marvel universe, as well as preparatory drawings, storyboards and props from Marvel films such as Thor’s hammer Mjolnir, Iron Man’s helmet and Captain America’s shield, the original cover art from the first Silver Surfer comic, as well as digital paintings by Ryan Meinerding, artistic supervisor for the majority of Marvel films.

• Studio Ghibli Layout Design : Understanding the secrets of Takahata and Miyazaki animation : this exhibition was open from 4 October 2014 to 1 March 2015. It revealed over 1,300 preparatory drawings from the most famous films of the Japanese studio, among which My Neighbor Totoro, Spirited Away, Grave of the Fireflies or The Wind Rises.

• Aardman, Art That Takes Shape: the exhibition of the art of Aardman Animations, creators of characters such as Morph, Wallace and Gromit, Shaun the Sheep, or the stop-motion animation films Chicken Run or The Pirates! In an Adventure with Scientists!, is open from 21 March to 30 August 2015, presenting original sets from movies and shows, 350 drawings, sculptures, storyboards, film extracts, clips and advertisements.

• The Art in Video Games - French inspiration: the exhibition opened on September 25, 2015. It showcases the work of artists from French video game studios, such as Ubisoft, Spiders, Arkane, Osome, and Swing Swing Submarine, presenting more than 800 artworks: drawings and preparatory sketches, watercolors, sculptures and digital paintings. Emmanuel Ethis, in his contribution to the Nouvel Observateur, says that a video game is indeed a Total Art, because if it is ludique by nature, it also carries the sovereign ambition of being recorded in a connoted history, rich in correspondences and references to all art forms that preceded it, that we discover thanks to Jean-Jacques Launier, curator of the exhibition dedicated to French inspiration in the Art in the video games.
