= Frac Centre-Val de Loire =

French regional collection of contemporary art

- The Frac Centre-Val de Loire building by Jakob + MacFarlane
- Established: 1983
- Location: boulevard Rocheplatte, Orléans
- Coordinates: 47.9040°N 1.8963°E
- Type: Regional collection of contemporary art (Frac)
- Website: www.frac-centre.fr

The Frac Centre-Val de Loire, formerly known as Frac Centre, is a public collection of contemporary art of the Centre-Val de Loire region in France, part of the national Frac network. It is based in Orléans. In 2013, it moved onto the site of a former military base, with a new museum building designed by Jakob + MacFarlane.

== History ==
Since 1999, the Frac Centre-Val de Loire has organized a series of contemporary art exhibits featuring both local and global work, titled ArchiLab and focused on architecture. The collection includes some 13,000 works, 700 architectural models and more than 12,000 drawings. It traces the history of the visionary architects of the 1960s, the utopian and radical architecture of the 1970s, and the deconstructivists of the 1980s. It also features contemporary Japanese architects and illustrates the impact of digital technologies on architecture.

Other museums have held exhibits dedicated to the Frac Centre-Val de Loire collection, including Tokyo's Mori Art Museum and the Barbican's Future City exhibit in 2007.
