= Walt Disney Classics Collection =

Series of Walt Disney themed sculptures

The Walt Disney Classics Collection (WDCC) is a series of collectible sculptures of Walt Disney characters and scenes. The sculptures were initially produced under the supervision of the Disney animators, and were hand painted and produced in limited editions. They were introduced in July 1992. The sculptures often sold in the secondary market at a multiple of the initial sale price. They ceased production in 2012.
