= List of Pixar film references =

Beginning with Red's Dream and its references to previous Pixar short films, Pixar has included references in its films to other works produced by the studio. These have included cameo appearances, references to characters, objects, and titles of works. Additionally, such easter eggs or in-jokes can refer to Pixar staff, associates, or places or events from the company's past. Lastly, some things, such as A113, Pizza Planet, or actor John Ratzenberger have appeared in the majority of Pixar films, establishing a set of traditions that subsequent Pixar films try to include.

The following is a list of all documented self-referential nods contained within Pixar films and shorts that the various filmmakers have incorporated into their movies.

== Traditions ==
=== A113 ===
A113 is an Easter egg that has been inserted into several animated television shows and feature films as a homage to a classroom at CalArts, the alma mater of former Pixar/Disney executive John Lasseter and director Brad Bird, among others. Bird was the first to use the A113 Easter egg, on a car license plate in an animated segment entitled Family Dog in a 1987 episode of the television series Amazing Stories.

- Toy Story trilogy – A113 is the license plate number on Andy's mom's minivan, later replaced by a CUV in Toy Story 3.
- A Bug's Life – A113 is the code on a cereal box as Flik enters the bug city.
- Monsters, Inc. – On the news broadcast on TV, the newscasters are shaped like "A" and "1", while the background says 13. Additionally, when Randall gets beaten up in the caravan, the stars in the sky can be connected to read A113.
- Finding Nemo – A113 is the model code on the camera used by a scuba diver.
- The Incredibles – A113 is the conference room number in Syndrome's lair, mentioned by Mirage. Also, when Mr. Incredible is imprisoned, he is kept at level A1 in cell number 13.
- Cars – A113 is the number of the freight train that almost crashes into Lightning McQueen while he is first on his way to Radiator Springs. It is also Mater's license plate number in both the film and the related short film, Mater and the Ghostlight.
- Ratatouille – Git, the lab rat, has a tag on his left ear that reads "A113".
- WALL-E – A113 is the code for the directive given to the Axiom's autopilot to never return to Earth. This to date has been the largest involvement of the A113 Easter egg in the plot of a Pixar film.
- Up – A113 is the number of the courtroom where Carl Fredricksen is called in.
- Cars 2 – A113 is the number on Siddeley's tail. It remains the number on Mater's license plate, and it is part of the image number on the spy photo of Miles Axelrod's engine.
- Brave – ACXIII (A113 in Roman numerals) is carved above the doorway of the witch's cottage.
- Monsters University – A113 is the number of the lecture hall where James P. "Sulley" Sullivan and Mike Wazowski have their first class.
- Inside Out – When Riley Andersen heads to her new school in San Francisco, she is put in room A113. "A113" is also written in graffiti on a building in the scene where she is walking up a street going towards a bus and gets a call from her mother.
- The Good Dinosaur – A113 is formed from the sticks of the wooden fence of the cluckers' enclosure at Arlo's family's farm.
- Finding Dory – Seals Rudder and Fluke have "A1" and "13" tags on their tail fins. Also, near the end of the film a license plate on a truck reads "CALA113".
- Cars 3 – A113 is the number of Sterling's office space. Also, one of Ms. Fritter's victims' licence plate reads "A01-13L".
- Coco – One of Ernesto de la Cruz records in Miguel's attic hideout has a catalog number A-113. A113 also appears on the door of the Bureau of Family Grievances in the Land of the Dead.
- Incredibles 2 – A113 is spray-painted on the dumpster behind which Frozone is hiding from the Underminer's attack. The model name of the runaway maglev train that Elastigirl stops is MGLV-A113. Also, A113 is on the door of the editing room of Devtech, and it appears as the document code on the International Superhero Accord. Near the end of the film, Tony and Violet are going on a date at a movie theater showing a movie called "Dementia 113".
- Toy Story 4 – A vintage 1970s-style A113 sign appears in the antique store.
- Onward – A police officer calls Officer Bronco saying "we got a one-one-three in progress" on the radio.
- Soul – A113 appears on one of the street signs in the Hall of Everything.
- Luca – A113 is the number on Luca Paguro's train ticket to Genova.
- Turning Red – Meilin "Mei" Lee's dad uses a "Professional Model A113" line chalker at the Skydome. Also, during the end credits, A113 appears on the 4*TOWN concert tickets.
- Lightyear – A113 is seen outside the window of Alisha Hawthorne's office.
- Elemental – The "Now Approaching Element City" sign seen in the film's teaser trailer reads "A H Al" in the corner; the atomic numbers of hydrogen (H) and aluminum (Al) are 1 and 13, respectively. During the film itself, A113 is seen as a room number at City Hall in the scene where Wade Ripple's bag accidentally catches fire when he hides Ember Lumen.
- Inside Out 2 – The secret vault that holds Bloofy, Lance and Deep Dark Secret is labeled ACXIII, which is A113 in Roman numerals.
- Elio – Elio Solís' backpack says "Area 113".
- Hoppers – A113 is the room number on the door of the laboratory. When Dr. Sam shows Mabel Tanaka the chalkboard, a dog collar that translates thought is Idea #113.

=== John Ratzenberger ===
Described as "Pixar's good luck charm" by John Lasseter, actor John Ratzenberger played a role in every Pixar feature from Toy Story to Onward and subsequent sequels, including productions that were not produced by Pixar. (Note: Both Planes and its sequel were produced by Disneytoon Studios instead of Pixar, but were set in the world of Cars, while Monsters at Work was produced by Disney Television Animation, but was set in the Monsters, Inc. universe.)

- Toy Story, Toy Story 2, Toy Story 3, Toy Story 4, and Toy Story 5 – Hamm the piggy bank
- A Bug's Life – P.T. Flea
- Monsters, Inc., Monsters University, and Monsters at Work – Adorable the Abominable Snowman
  - In the seventh first-season episode of Monsters at Work, Ratzenberger also voices Bernard, Tylor Tuskmon's father.
- Finding Nemo – School of moonfish
- The Incredibles and Incredibles 2 – The Underminer
- Cars, Cars 2, and Cars 3 – Mack
  - At the end of Cars, there is a drive-in theater that shows John Ratzenberger as some of the parts of the movies, which are car-versions of Toy (Car) Story, A Bug's Life, and Monster (Trucks), Inc. Mack even notes that they keep using the same actor again.
- Ratatouille – Mustafa the waiter
- WALL-E – John
- Up – Tom the foreman
- Brave – Gordon the guard
- Inside Out and Inside Out 2 – Fritz the mind worker
- The Good Dinosaur – Earl the velociraptor
- Finding Dory – Bill the crab
- Coco – Juan Ortodoncia, a skeleton in the Land of the Dead with bad teeth
- Onward – Fenwick the cyclops construction worker

Although Ratzenberger himself did not participate in Soul, a computer-animated version of the actor can be seen 1-hour-and-8-minutes into the film as a tribute, when Joe Gardner (Mr. Mittens) chases 22 (Joe) into the Subway station. He is wearing a white dress shirt and a red tie.

=== Luxo Ball ===
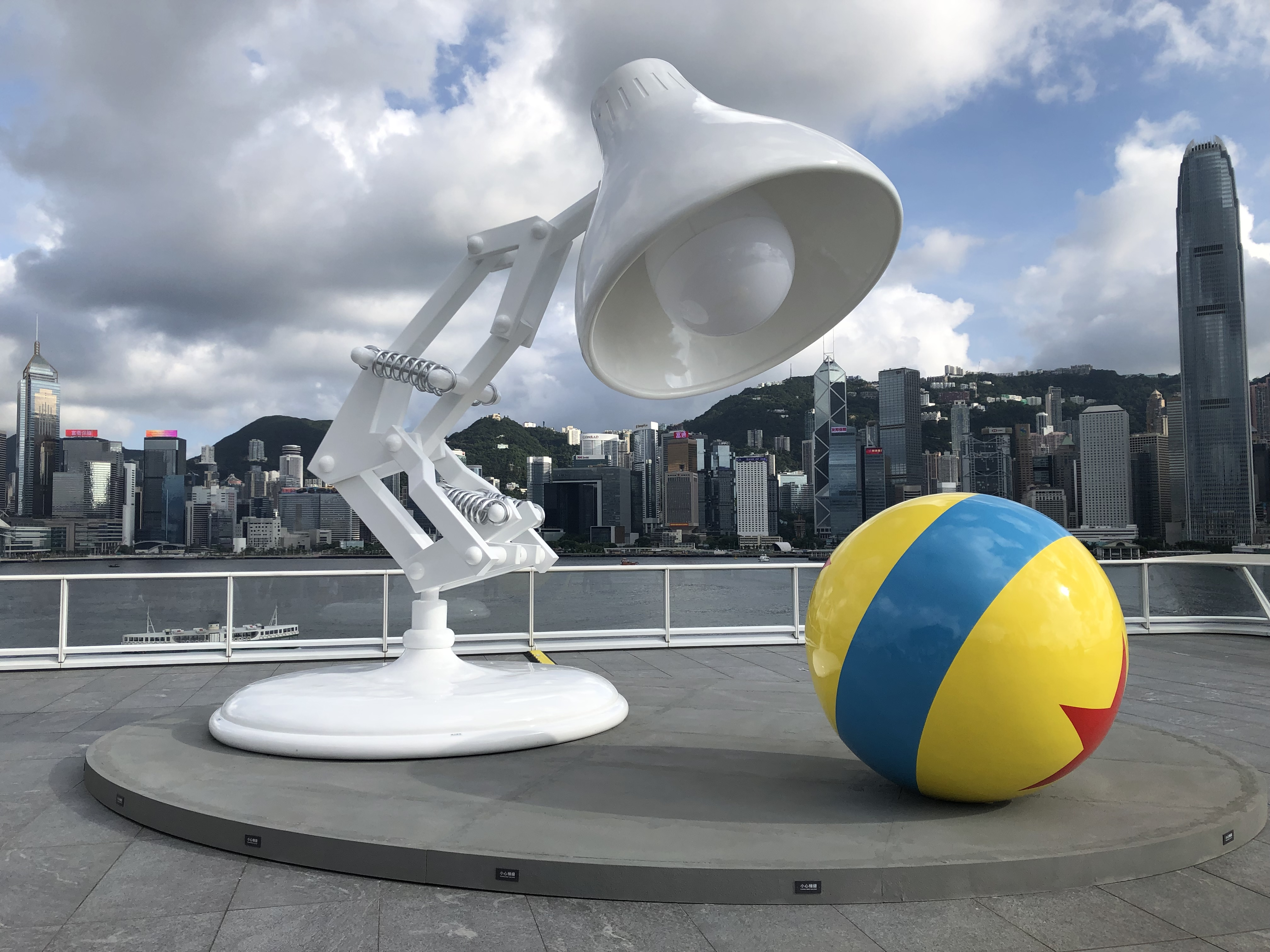
Luxo Jr (lamp) next to a Luxo ball

A yellow ball with a blue stripe and a red star, which was first shown in the short Luxo, Jr., has been shown in several Pixar feature films and shorts, most prominently in the Toy Story franchise, as well as the print Pixar icon.

- The ball's design pattern appeared on the floor of the circus ring in Red's Dream.
- When Buzz Lightyear demonstrates how he "flies" in Toy Story, he bounces off a Luxo Ball.
- In Toy Story 2, one Luxo Ball appears in a TV commercial for Al's Toy Barn. Several Luxo Balls can also be seen when the toys are in the store itself: when entering, one can be easily seen to the left; when leaving, a whole box of Luxo Balls can be seen to the left.
- A Luxo Ball appears in a trailer for Toy Story and Toy Story 2 double feature in Disney Digital 3-D.
- In Boo's room in Monsters, Inc.; When Boo returns to her room, she gives Sulley the ball.
- In the toy chest at the dentist office in Finding Nemo.
- In the Incredibles short film Jack-Jack Attack as one of the toys given to Jack-Jack by Kari.
- On the floor of a neighbor child's room and on one of Russell's merit badges in Up.
- In the teaser trailer for Toy Story 3, Bullseye rolls on the Luxo Ball and it forms the fake logo for the film. In the film itself, the ball is seen as a design on a tile in Sunnyside Daycare. The ball itself is also used as a volleyball by Chunk and Jack-in-the-Box during the credits.
- In Brave, a wooden version of the Luxo Ball is seen inside the witch's cottage.
- In Monsters University, the ball is drawn as graffiti on a wall during the Scare games.
- In Inside Out, the ball briefly appears during a flashback of young Riley playing hide and seek with Bing Bong.
- In The Good Dinosaur, the Luxo Ball is seen flying past Arlo and Spot in an odd scene where their bodies are switched.
- In Finding Dory, the Luxo Ball is seen as a design on a truck's steering wheel.
- In Cars 3, a Crazy 8 demolition derby car named Bill is painted in the ball's colors (red, yellow, and blue) and has balls on its wheels.
- In Coco, a Mexican wrestling mask has the colors of the ball and a red star on top.
- In Incredibles 2, the Luxo Ball is seen on a seal as a design on Jack-Jack's crib.
- In Toy Story 4, when Buzz is stuck at the wall of prizes, plastic rockets that have the star and the blue stripe from the Luxo Ball on them can be seen hanging next to him. The ball itself also appears in the antique shop.
- In Onward, the Luxo Ball is seen on a metal shield in the Manticore's Tavern.
- In Soul, a translucent version of the Luxo Ball can be seen to the left of the sink and the couch in 22's cardboard box home.
- In Luca, the ball is briefly seen on a tiled rooftop balcony of a building on the Italian Riviera during the bike race.
- In Turning Red, the ball is seen in the swimming pool at Tyler's party.
- In Elemental, the ball can be seen as the "o" in the "Popcorn" logo on the red and white container of popcorn that Wade holds.
- In Inside Out 2, the ball is seen in the parade of future careers inside Riley's mind.
- Win or Lose:
  - In "Coach's Kid", the ball is seen by a swing set in the same shot as the Pizza Planet truck during Laurie's run to the softball field to train.
  - In "Pickle", a miniature version of the ball is seen at the daycare, which Vanessa uses to prevent Zane from biting. The ball is also seen at the party.
- In Elio, the ball is seen on Elio's desk.

=== Pizza Planet ===
Pizza Planet is a fictional pizza restaurant that appears in Toy Story. In the film, it is a large, sci-fi-themed restaurant with arcade games including robot guards at the entrance. The company runs a fleet of derelict Toyota Hilux pickup trucks (as evidenced by the inscription on the tailgate; it is a Toyota inscription with the first and last two letters, "TO" and "TA", worn off so it simply appears as "YO") with a rocket on the roof featuring the restaurant's logo, as seen in Toy Story, Toy Story 2, and Toy Story 3 (though in Toy Story 2, the truck model is called a "Gyoza" as seen on the owner's manual). There is a Pizza Planet reference in every Pixar feature film to date except for the 2004 film The Incredibles. Lee Unkrich confirmed that there is no Pizza Planet truck anywhere in The Incredibles. Director Brad Bird said that he was too busy making the film to tell the animation team to insert the truck.

- In Toy Story, Woody sees the truck at the gas station and tells Buzz it is a spaceship with hyper-active hyperdrive which they head on it to the restaurant itself.
- In A Bug's Life, the truck appears in the scene where one insect warns another not to touch a motor home's bug zapper. A Pizza Planet cup also appears in the Bug City.
- In Toy Story 2, Mr. Potato Head sees the Pizza Planet truck parked outside Al McWhiggin's apartment building, which he, Rex, Hamm, Slinky Dog, and Buzz drive to the airport to save Woody.
- In Monsters, Inc., when a redneck mother is beating Randall with a shovel, the truck is on the far left side of the screen, next to the same motor home that appeared in A Bug's Life.
- In Finding Nemo, while Gill is explaining his plan to escape from the dentist office, a yellow Pizza Planet truck drives by.
- In Cars, there is an anthropomorphic Pizza Planet truck named Todd at the stadium for the final race. There also exists a diecast car of it.
- In Ratatouille, the Pizza Planet truck is briefly seen crossing the bridge over the Seine when Skinner is chasing Remy.
- In WALL-E, EVE scans the engine of a Pizza Planet truck for plant life shortly after her arrival on Earth, and shuts the hood afterwards.
- In Up, the Pizza Planet truck is seen on the street as Carl's house floats by, although the truck has more of a delivery van appearance than the actual truck in other films. An actual Pizza Planet truck can be seen in a parking lot when Carl has a fantasy of leaving Russell. At the end, when Carl takes Russell and Dug for ice cream, the real Pizza Planet truck can be seen parked.
- In Toy Story 3, Lots-o-Huggin' Bear, Big Baby, and Chuckles ride on the back of the Pizza Planet truck before they are bumped off. Pizza Planet is also seen as a calendar sponsor.
- In Cars 2, Todd the Pizza Planet truck is seen two times. He is first seen on the TV behind the bar. He is next seen at the Radiator Springs Grand Prix. He also appears in the background of a triptych poster of the film, in front of Buckingham Palace.
- In Brave, the Pizza Planet truck appears as a wood carving in the witch's cottage. John Lasseter commented in an interview that although the story of Brave takes place in the past, they found a way to put the Pizza Planet truck in the story.
- In Monsters University, the Pizza Planet truck is seen parked outside the Jaws Theta Chi house party.
- In Inside Out, the Pizza Planet truck is seen inside two memory orbs outside of headquarters in Riley's mind. The first is seen when Joy is chasing Bing Bong. The second is seen when Joy, Sadness and Bing Bong are on the train of thought.
- In The Good Dinosaur, an asteroid in the shape of the Pizza Planet truck can be seen in the asteroid belt. Director Peter Sohn indicated that the truck makes a second appearance in the film, which appears to be the shape made of two rocks in the rock structure.
- In Finding Dory, the Pizza Planet truck is seen in an underwater junkyard, which Dory, Nemo, and Marlin swim past before encountering a giant squid.
- In Cars 3, Todd the Pizza Planet truck can be briefly seen participating in the Crazy 8 demolition derby.
- In Coco, the Pizza Planet truck is seen in the montage of Miguel's grandmother Abuelita expressing her ban of music. It drives by Miguel's house playing music which Miguel listens to, at which point Abuelita closes the window to prevent him from listening further.
- In Incredibles 2, the truck is seen in an empty alleyway when Elastigirl ends her fight with a fake Screenslaver (the pizza delivery man).
- In Toy Story 4, the truck appears as a tattoo on Axel the Carnie's leg.
- In Onward, the Pizza Planet truck is seen near a toll booth, among a few other appearances. In fitting with the fantasy theme, the rocket now reads "Pizza Realm".
- In Soul, the truck is seen in the Hall of Everything when Joe and 22 first enter.
- In Luca, the Pizza Planet truck has been modified to be a delivery scooter, along with the other scooters that reside in Portorosso.
- In Turning Red, the Pizza Planet truck is seen on the street as Mei heads towards the 4*TOWN concert.
- In Lightyear, the truck can be seen on T'Kani Prime as Buzz and Sox leave to attempt a new hyperspace test.
- In Elemental, a wooden truck called a "Treeyota", which resembles Pizza Planet's, appears in the scene where Ember makes deliveries. Also, a Pizza Planet delivery boat appears in the scene where Cinder follows Ember to Wade's family apartment.
- In Inside Out 2, a miniature origami version of the Pizza Planet truck can be seen on a table next to Joy's bed.
- Win or Lose:
  - In "Coach's Kid", the truck appears at the start of Laurie's run toward the softball field to train.
  - In "Raspberry", the truck appears when Vanessa drives Rochelle home from the game, as well as in the parking lot of the middle school. Pizza Planet boxes are seen at the party.
  - In "Pickle", the truck appears in the parking lot in the scene where Vanessa talks to Rochelle after the game.
  - In "Steal", Pizza Planet boxes appear at the party.
  - The truck appears in the background of "Mixed Signals" in the scene where Yuwen speaks with Kai. (The scene from "Steal" from a different perspective.)
  - In "I Got It", a toy version of the truck appears in Kai's bedroom.
  - In "Home", the truck appears at the gas station.
- In Elio, the Pizza Planet truck can be briefly seen parked outside Gunther Melmac's house.
- In Hoppers, the truck appears as a toy model in the trophy case.
- In Toy Story 5, the Pizza Planet truck can be briefly seen driving past the toys on the road.

== Companies ==
To avoid overt product placement in Pixar films, a series of fictional companies are used as placeholders. Some appear only in one franchise (such as fictional NASCAR sponsors in Cars) but others serve as recurring themes.

=== Buy-n-Large (BnL) ===
Buy-n-Large is a fictional megacorporation that first appeared in WALL-E as the entity which controlled all economic and government services on the future Earth.

- WALL-E:
  - Buy-n-Large logos are seen throughout the movie and the company president appears in a message to the captain of the Axiom.
- Toy Story 3:
  - Buzz Lightyear's batteries are "BnL Alkaline".
- Cars 3:
  - One of the race tracks on which Jackson Storm is shown having a winning streak is called "BnL Raceway".
- Soul:
  - The Buy-n-Large logo is featured in one of the stickers.

=== Dinoco ===
Dinoco logo as it appeared in Toy Story (1995)

Dinoco is a fictional oil company that first appeared in Toy Story as a small gas station. It plays a central role as a key race car sponsor in the Cars franchise, and made a small cameo in WALL-E. The company's logo is a dinosaur, but with a Brontosaurus in Toy Story and a Tyrannosaurus in Cars (a reference to Sinclair Oil, which uses a similar dinosaur logo; the name, however, is similar to Sunoco, the current oil and gasoline sponsor of NASCAR).

- Toy Story:
  - Andy's Mom goes to the gas station to fuel and it's where Woody and Buzz fight and are left behind.
- Cars:
  - The company's branding uses a pale blue shade referred to as "Dinoco blue", originally created for Richard Petty's racecar. "The King", a veteran racer on the verge of retirement, is portrayed with Dinoco branding as #43, a Plymouth Superbird. Dinoco is the most lucrative sponsor in the Piston Cup, a parody of NASCAR's Grand National driver's trophy series, which was originally called Winston Cup lending its name to the "Dinoco 400" race at the "Motor Speedway of the South", an enlarged Bristol Speedway. Its owner Tex is a loyal, longtime sponsor of "The King". This corporate sponsorship is the primary trophy for which the race cars in Cars contend. The Dinoco brand is prominently featured in a lot of Cars-related merchandise.
- WALL-E:
  - The Dinoco name and logo appear on a lighter.
- Toy Story 4:
  - Bonnie's parents stop at a Dinoco gas station to fill up their RV.

=== Eggman Movers ===
Eggman Movers, also known as Eggman Moving, is a fictional moving company that has an anthropomorphic egg with a hat as a mascot and appears mostly throughout the Toy Story franchise. The company's name is a reference to Pixar production designer Ralph Eggleston.

- Toy Story:
  - An Eggman Movers moving truck is heavily featured in the climax of the film, as Andy's family moves from their old house to their new one.
- Toy Story 4:
  - An old advertising sign for Eggman Moving appears at the antique store.
- Toy Story 5
  - The tech devices featured were created by Eggman Tech.

=== Poultry Palace ===
Poultry Palace is a fictional chicken-based fast-food chain that first appears in the Toy Story short Small Fry.

- Toy Story 4:
  - During their road trip, Bonnie and her parents can briefly be seen eating at a Poultry Palace location.
  - At the antiques store, an old Poultry Palace sign can be seen.
- Onward:
  - A Poultry Palace cup can be seen on the gas station's counter.
- Lightyear:
  - Poultry Palace-branded cookies can be seen in the vending machine at the mining facility.

== Movies ==
=== Toy Story franchise ===
These Pixar films contain the following references to the Toy Story films, shorts, and television specials:

- A Bug's Life:
  - In one of the bloopers that play during the end credits, Flik, as he is about to take flight, quotes Buzz Lightyear's catchphrase "To Infinity and Beyond", instead of "For the colony, and for oppressed ants everywhere!".
  - One of the additional bloopers features Woody as a crewman, running the clapperboard, appearing after Dr. Flora accidentally pronounced Atta as "Princess Abba", and she, with Mr. Soil, jokes of it after.
- Monsters, Inc.:
  - Andy's cloud wallpaper is shown while Randall is practicing his scares.
  - When Boo returns home at the end, a Jessie doll is seen on her table. She then hands Sulley the doll.
  - A larger version of a clown toy from Andy's Room appears at the laugh floor at the end near the laugh canisters.
  - During a blooper, while Mike and Sulley are walking to work, they wait at a crosswalk next to Ted's leg, who roars and stomps his feet. The camera zooms out to reveal that the leg belongs to Rex, who then asks anxiously how it went, if he can do it again and promises to be taller. In the actual film, Ted makes chicken sounds.
- Finding Nemo:
  - When Nemo is frantically looking for a way to escape the fish tank in the dentist's office, a Buzz Lightyear action figure can be seen lying next to the toy box in the waiting room.
- Cars:
  - The tires of all the Piston Cup racers (including Lightning McQueen) are Lightyear Buzzard tires, a reference to Buzz Lightyear and Goodyear Eagle tires.
  - The drive-in theater shows Toy Car Story, featuring stylized car versions of characters Woody, Buzz Lightyear and Hamm.
- WALL-E:
  - Rex is seen in WALL-E's house.
  - Hamm can be seen in WALL-E's house when EVE visits.
  - The orange traffic cones from Toy Story 2 can be seen in garbage piles and WALL-E's room.
- Up:
  - The grape soda brand for the bottle cap that Ellie gives to Carl is the same as seen in the Buzz Lightyear commercial in Toy Story.
  - Lots-O'-Huggin' Bear can be seen as the balloons pass a child's room.
- Coco:
  - Woody and Buzz piñatas are seen in Santa Cecilia.
- Hoppers:
  - One of the green aliens can be seen on Mabel's phone case.

=== A Bug's Life ===
These Pixar films and shorts contain the following references to A Bug's Life:

- Toy Story 2:
  - The calendar in Andy's room shows a still image of ants carrying food and walking across a blade of grass.
  - When Mrs. Potato Head is waiting for her earring, she's reading a storybook retelling the events of A Bug's Life.
  - Heimlich can be seen as a small caterpillar, crawling on a branch just before Buzz cuts through. In the bloopers reel seen in some cuts of the film, this is expanded upon in a small scene where Heimlich and Flik discuss a potential sequel to A Bug's Life on the branch before getting knocked off by Buzz.
  - Some of the characters are seen as toys after the "NEW" banner at Al's Toy Barn is seen.
  - The tree on top of the hill during the "When She Loved Me" sequence is the same tree that tops Ant Island.
- Monsters, Inc.:
  - The place Randall gets banished to is the old trailer with the deadly bug light and the Pizza Planet truck.
- Cars:
  - The drive-in theater shows A Bug's Life, featuring stylized car versions of characters Flik, the circus bugs and P.T. Flea.
- Your Friend the Rat:
  - P.T. Flea appears when the rats are talking about fleas causing the Black Death.
- Toy Story 3:
  - When Woody climbs into the ceiling at Sunnyside, letters spelling ATTA, the name of the Princess are seen.
  - A toy version of Flik can be seen jumping away as the line of children are about to come back in from recess.
- Toy Story 4:
  - At the Second Chance Antiques store, the Casey Jr. cookie box as well as a "P.J.'s Pop" sign can be seen as store items.

=== Monsters, Inc. franchise ===
These Pixar films contain the following references to Monsters, Inc. or Monsters University:

- Finding Nemo:
  - The fish mobile found in the dentist's office is the same one featured in Boo's room.
  - Mike Wazowski can be seen swimming in scuba gear during the credits.
- Cars:
  - The drive-in theater shows Monster Trucks, Inc., featuring stylized car versions of characters Sulley, Mike, and the Abominable Snowman (here known as the Abominable Snowplow).
- WALL-E:
  - One of the many garbage cubes in the movie is the garbage cube Sulley had thought Boo was in. Also, a Mike Wazowski antenna ball is seen.
- Toy Story 3:
  - A girl in the Butterfly Room at Sunnyside Daycare looks like a slightly older Boo.
  - Toy versions of Boo and Mike Wazowski are seen in Sunnyside Daycare.
- Brave:
  - A wood carving of Sulley appears in the witch's hut, as an allusion to the studio's next film, Monsters University.
- Hoppers:
  - Idea #43 on the chalkboard stems from the question of turning vocal sounds into energy.
- Toy Story 5:
  - In the wedding sequence, Rex turns blue with purple spots, a reference to Sulley.

=== Finding Nemo franchise ===
These Pixar films and shorts contain the following references to Finding Nemo and Finding Dory:

- Monsters, Inc.:
  - On the wall behind the sushi chef at Harryhausen's, there is a clownfish.
  - Before Mike says "And he is....outta here!" as Sulley is throwing Randall through a door to the motor home from A Bug's Life, Nemo can be seen hanging on the wall.
  - Boo gives Sulley a Nemo toy before he leaves her room. (As Monsters, Inc. was made before Finding Nemo this was a sneak peek.)
- Boundin':
  - The arm that grabs the lamb belongs to the dentist.
  - The fish are based on Gurgle.
- WALL-E:
  - In the end credits, Crush appears as a mosaic.
- Toy Story 3:
  - Mr. Ray is on a shelf at the daycare.
  - One of the dolphins is on a shelf at the daycare.
  - A Nemo sticker is seen on Andy's toy dresser.
  - Images of Nemo and Dory are seen on the wall at Sunnyside Daycare when Buzz escapes the Caterpillar room.
- The Good Dinosaur:
  - Hank appears at the bottom of a river when Arlo learns to swim.
- Hoppers:
  - The young turtle that a young Mabel tries to free in her classroom is named Crush, which is the same name for the father turtle in the Finding Nemo franchise.
- Toy Story 5:
  - In the sequence where Lilypad is scrolling on a website called "Ribbit", an image of the ocean floor from the first Finding Nemo can be seen.

=== The Incredibles franchise ===
These Pixar films contain the following references to The Incredibles and Incredibles 2:

- Finding Nemo:
  - A young boy in the dentist's office is reading a Mr. Incredible comic book.
- Ratatouille:
  - Bomb Voyage appears as a mime.
- WALL-E:
  - A Frozone bobblehead is seen in WALL-E's truck. In some BnL advertisements, including those in the special edition DVD, there is a family who resembles the Parr family.
- Cars 2:
  - The marquee at the Radiator Springs Drive-In Theater reads "The Incredimobiles".
- Coco:
  - A themed Incredibles poster can be seen as Miguel and Hector make their way to the Land of the Dead talent show.

=== Cars franchise ===
These films and shorts contain references to Cars, Cars 2 or Cars 3:

- Finding Nemo:
  - A yellow Fiat 500 similar to Luigi can be seen driving across the street.
- Boundin':
  - Stanley makes a cameo appearance.
- The Incredibles:
  - When the Incredibles and Frozone fight against the Omnidroid, a non-anthropomorphic Doc Hudson can be seen parked in the background.
- WALL-E:
  - A Lightning McQueen toy is seen.
  - A Leak Less bottle is seen.
- Toy Story 3:
  - In the Western action sequence at the beginning of the film, the runaway train has the engine number 95, a reference to Lightning McQueen and the year the original Toy Story came out.
  - A Lightning McQueen-styled wooden car appears in the Daycare.
  - "ReVolting" batteries are seen on a table where some of the toys are playing cards. (ReVolting was the sponsor for Car #84.)
  - When Buzz shakes hands with Sparks, a tractor toy similar to the "cows" rolls past them.
  - The calendar in Andy's room which used to show an image from A Bug's Life now has a picture of a non-anthropomorphic Snot Rod from Cars. Both calendars, years apart, are turned to the month of August.
  - Finn McMissile is seen on a poster in Andy's room.
  - A firetruck that resembles Red is seen at Sunnyside Daycare.
  - A child at Sunnyside Daycare wears a shirt with a 95 emblazoned with a lightning bolt, a reference to Lightning McQueen.
- Finding Dory:
  - A truck driver has a Lightning McQueen Band-Aid on his right hand, alluding to Cars 3.
- Hoppers:
  - Idea #52 on the chalkboard is putting a human consciousness inside a car.

=== Ratatouille ===
These films contain references to the film Ratatouille:

- WALL-E:
  - Skinner's scooter can be seen in the junkyard.
- Cars 2:
  - In Paris, a car version of Gusteau's Restaurant is seen as "Gastow's" in the background.

=== WALL-E ===
These films contain references to the film WALL-E:

- Your Friend the Rat:
  - WALL-E can be seen driving a bus-like ship on a future human-colonized Mars.
- Hoppers:
  - The design of the cleaning robot in Idea #8 on the chalkboard is a direct match for WALL-E.

=== Up ===
These films contain references to the film Up:

- Ratatouille:
  - As Remy runs through Paris, a shadow of Dug is cast against a wall.
- WALL-E:
  - Carl's walker can be seen among WALL-E's collection.
- Toy Story 3:
  - One of the papers (which is a postcard) on top of Andy's dresser says "Carl and Ellie Fredricksen" on it.
- Toy Story 4:
  - At the Second Chance Antiques store, a painting of Charles Muntz and his four dogs playing poker can be seen.
  - Bo Peep's sheep pick up a cap of Grape Soda.
- Hoppers:
  - A Wilderness Explorer's Badge can be seen on Mabel's phone case.
  - Idea #113 on the chalkboard shows Dr. Sam's idea for a collar that translates a dog's barks into speech.
  - Idea #206 on the chalkboard shows a dog in a plane with the description, "What if we trained dogs to fly?"

=== Brave ===
These films or shorts contain references to the film Brave:

- Cars 2:
  - During the London chase scene, the Lemons crash into a pub. On the wall is a tapestry depicting Princess Merida and her family as cars.

=== Inside Out franchise ===
These films contain references to the films Inside Out and Inside Out 2:

- Finding Dory:
  - Riley made a cameo appearance alongside numerous children in the Marine Life Institute.
- Cars 3:
  - Two racecars are sponsored by the TripleDent brand, which in-universe is sold as a "spearmint-flavored dent filler".
- Incredibles 2:
  - A 60's styled TripleDent logo can be spotted as:
    - Helen gives chase to the Metrolev Train.
    - The Parrs go after a group of robbers in the film's final scene.
- Toy Story 4:
  - At the antique store, an old advertising sign for TripleDent gum and Bing-Bong's wagon can be seen.
- Onward:
  - In the gas station, TripleDent gum can be seen on the counter.
- Soul:
  - A Brang advertisement is seen on the subway, in reference to the startup company Riley's dad works for.
- Turning Red:
  - At the Daisy Mart, TripleDent gum can be seen in some display racks.

=== The Good Dinosaur ===
These films contain references to the film The Good Dinosaur:

- Monsters University:
  - Dinosaur toys resembling Arlo are seen on the floor during the last Scare Games event.
- Inside Out:
  - Dinosaur statues based on several characters from the film are seen in a flashback.

=== Coco ===
These films contain references to the film Coco:

- Cars 3:
  - Cruz uses an image of the Santa Cecilia Grave to motivate a homesick trainee.
  - The Shiny Guitar is hung on the wall behind the band playing at the Cotter Pin Bar in Thomasville.
- Toy Story 4:
  - A toy version of Héctor's guitar is among the wall of prizes.
  - On a record player at the Second Chance Antiques store, a Greatest Hits record of Ernesto de la Cruz can be seen.

=== Luca ===
These projects contain references to the film Luca:

- Elio:
  - One person says "Giulia from Italia," via the Ham radio in the spacecraft.

=== Turning Red ===
These projects contain references to the film Turning Red:

- Luca:
  - A 4*TOWN vinyl record can be seen in Giulia's room (titled 4*VILLAGI).
- Inside Out 2:
  - A 4*TOWN poster can be seen in Riley's room.
- Dream Productions:
  - "Nobody Like U" and "You Know What's Up" by 4*TOWN are featured in two of the episodes.

=== Lightyear ===
These films contain references to the film Lightyear.

- Turning Red:
  - Miriam's skateboard include stickers with the logo for Star Command as well as Sox.
- Hoppers:
  - The robot feline in Idea #92 on the chalkboard looks similar to Sox.

== Shorts ==
=== The Adventures of André and Wally B. ===
These films contain references to The Adventures of André and Wally B.:

- Red's Dream:
  - André is on a clock.
- Toy Story:
  - A book with the same title as the short is visible on Andy's bookshelf.
- WALL-E
  - Wally B. is seen.
- Toy Story 3:
  - Wally B. is seen on Bonnie's backpack.
- Toy Story 4:
  - A handkerchief with the name Wally B. written on it appears in the antique store.
- Soul:
  - André's head appears in one of the stickers which appear several times throughout the film.

=== Luxo Jr. ===
These films contain references to Luxo Jr.:

- Toy Story:
  - On Andy's desk is the older lamp, although painted red instead of gray. The same lamp is seen in Toy Story 2.
- Toy Story 2:
  - Scenes from the short film can be seen on Andy's TV when Hamm is quickly flipping through the channels.
- WALL-E:
  - When WALL-E builds a statue of EVE from garbage, one of her arms is the older lamp.
- Lightyear:
  - A Luxo Jr. constellation can be seen in outer space.
- Elio:
  - The older lamp is seen on Elio's desk.

=== Red's Dream ===
These films contain references to Red's Dream:

- Toy Story:
  - The title of this short film is seen on a book.
- WALL-E:
  - The unicycle is visible at the left of the screen as WALL-E falls from the ceiling.

=== Tin Toy ===
These films contain references to Tin Toy:

- Toy Story:
  - A book named after the short is on Andy's bookshelf: the author is Lasseter.
- Toy Story 2:
  - Billy can be seen several times briefly on one of the channels on Andy's TV when Hamm is quickly flipping through the channels.
- Toy Story 3:
  - The same toys are cowering beneath a counter as Rex approaches the door.

=== Knick Knack ===
These films contain references to Knick Knack:

- Toy Story:
  - Knick Knack is the title of a book on Andy's bookshelf.
- Toy Story 2:
  - Scenes from the short film can be seen on Andy's TV when Hamm is quickly flipping through the channels.
- Up:
  - During "Married Life", when Carl is at the Travel Agency, the brochure on the desk features a picture of "Sunny Miami," which includes the girl in the bikini from this short.

=== For the Birds ===
The following Pixar films reference For the Birds:

- Cars:
  - The birds are seen sitting on a powerline during the musical segment as Mack and Lightning drive across the country. They chirp as the camera pans by them.
- Inside Out:
  - The birds are seen sitting on a powerline in a scene where Riley and her parents are driving to San Francisco.

=== Geri's Game ===
These Pixar films contain the following references to Geri's Game:

- Toy Story 2:
  - Al hires a man resembling Geri to restore Woody (credited as 'The Cleaner'). As a further reference to the character, chess pieces are seen in the middle drawer of his toolbox.

=== Boundin' ===
These Pixar films contain the following references to Boundin':

- Cars:
  - During the opening race, just before a fan trailer whistles, a picture of the Jackalope is seen at the back of a van.

=== Purl ===
These Pixar projects contain the following references to the SparkShorts film Purl:

- Turning Red:
  - Mei has a doll of the titular character in her bedroom.
- Win or Lose:
  - A doll of the titular character is seen in Kai's bedroom in "I Got It".

=== Burrow ===
These Pixar projects contain the following references to the SparkShorts film Burrow:

- Turning Red:
  - The rabbit can be seen on Mei's notebook.
- Elio:
  - The rabbit can be seen on a bottle of sunscreen.

== Apple ==
These Pixar films contain the following references to Apple Inc.

- Monsters, Inc.:
  - The magazine at the end of the film has the caption "Scare Different.", a parody of Apple's slogan, "Think different."
- Cars:
  - There is a car with a livery sporting an Apple logo and the number "84" (referencing the Macintosh's launch year) competing in the Piston Cup.
- WALL-E:
  - WALL-E uses an iPod Classic to watch Hello, Dolly!. Furthermore, a Macintosh startup sound plays when his battery is charged.
  - AUTO is voiced by the MacinTalk voice synthesis software on classic Mac OS.
  - EVE was designed in consultation with Jonathan Ive, at the time a major industrial designer for Apple, who was instrumental in the designs of the iMac, iPhone and iPod, among other devices.
- Up:
  - Carl uses a mouse that closely resembles the Apple Mighty Mouse during the end credits.
- Toy Story 3:
  - Andy's laptop has an iTunes window open on it.
  - Molly can be seen listening to music on an orange iPod with the bundled Apple earphones.
  - Woody uses an iMac running Safari to see how far Sunnyside Daycare is.
- Cars 2:
  - Finn McMissile mentions to Mater that Holley Shiftwell's secret cover is designing iPhone apps.
- Brave:
  - The end credits feature a dedication to Steve Jobs, the founder of Apple and chief executive of Pixar, who died in 2011.
  - The character of Lord Macintosh could possibly be a reference and tribute to Steve Jobs.
- Inside Out:
  - The phones used by the characters in the film have an interface closely resembling that of iPhones before the iOS 7 redesign.
- Cars 3:
  - Two cars in the races are sponsored by Apple, as shown on their livery.
  - In a scene where Lightning McQueen calls Mater, Mater's device has the ringtone that FaceTime uses by devices running IOS 4-10. The said device also says iPad in the top left corner & FaceTime under McQueen's name, the monitor McQueen uses resembles later model iMacs. When Mater answers, the sound used is the same one when answering a FaceTime call.
  - Cruz's portable treadmill makes the Macintosh startup sound when turned on.
- Coco:
  - The first Apple Macintosh computer can be seen in an office from the Bureau of Family Grievances.
- Inside Out 2:
  - The scene where Anxiety instructs the workers in Imagination Land using a large screen, and the subsequent destruction of said screen by one of the workers throwing a chair, is a direct parody of Apple's 1984 Macintosh commercial.
- Toy Story 5:
  - The character Lilypad can be seen running terminal commands in a GUI resembling macOS, using the zsh shell set as the default since macOS Catalina. She also has a voice command function similar to Siri, activated by saying "Hey Lily" (referencing the "Hey Siri" functionality).

== Cast and crew ==
=== Cameos ===
These Pixar films contain cameo appearances by Pixar employees.

Actor	Toy Story	A Bug's Life	Toy Story 2	Monsters, Inc.	Finding Nemo	The Incredibles	Cars	Ratatouille	WALL-E	Up	Toy Story 3	Cars 2	Brave	Monsters University	Inside Out	The Good Dinosaur	Finding Dory	Cars 3	Coco	Incredibles 2	Toy Story 4	Onward	Soul	Luca	Turning Red	Lightyear	Elemental	Inside Out 2	Elio	Hoppers	Toy Story 5	Shorts
John Lasseter		Harry	One of the Rock 'em, Sock 'em, Robots									John Lassetire and a Gambling Car																				
Joe Ranft	Lenny	Heimlich	Wheezy	Peter "Claws" Ward	Jacques		Red and Jerry																									
Jeff Pidgeon	Mr. Spell, Robot and Aliens		Mr. Spell and Aliens	Thaddeus "Phlegm" Bile							Aliens																					
Andrew Stanton	Commercial Chorus	A Fly and Zapped Bug	Emperor Zurg		Crush and Seagulls		Fred										Crush														Emperor Zurg	
Bob Peterson				Roz	Mr. Ray					Dug and Alpha	Janitor			Roz			Mr. Ray	Chick Hicks											Universal Users Manual			Geri in Geri's Game
Pete Docter										Campmaster Strauch and Kevin					Father's Anger													Father's Anger				
Lee Unkrich			One of the Rock 'em, Sock 'em, Robots								Jack in the Box								Credited under "additional voices"													
Teddy Newton								Talon Labarthe			Chatter Telephone																					
Brad Bird						Edna Mode		Ambrister Minion												Edna Mode												
Bud Luckey						Rick Dicker					Chuckles																					Narrator in Boundin'
Brad Lewis												Tubbs Pacer																				
Lou Romano						Bernie Kropp	Snotrod	Alfredo Linguini																								
Peter Sohn						Mugger		Emile						Scott "Squishy" Squibbles		Forrest Woodbrush		Credited under "additional voices"						Ciccio		Sox						
Steve Purcell													The Crow								Dummies							Deep Dark Secret		Amphibian King		
Dan Gerson				Smitty and Needleman																												
Ralph Eggleston																																Birds in For the Birds
Doug Sweetland																																Presto DiGiotagione and Alec Azam in Presto
Ken Schretzmann							Mini Van																									

=== References ===
These Pixar films contain references to Pixar employees.

- Toy Story:
  - "Eggman Movers", the name of the moving company, is a reference to Pixar production designer Ralph Eggleston, who is known as "Eggman".
- A Bug's Life:
  - "P.J.'s Pop", the name of a fictional soda brand that appears on a bottle cap, is a reference to John Lasseter's son Paul James Lasseter.
- Finding Nemo:
  - Brad Bird's son Nicholas provided the voice of Squirt.
- Ratatouille:
  - Colette rides a Calahan motorcycle, a reference to director of photography Sharon Calahan.
- Toy Story 3:
  - Pins on the map in Andy's room correspond to the hometowns of the production staff.
- Toy Story 4:
  - In the antique store appears a Papa Rivera's Pure Pork Lard sign, which is a nod to Toy Story 4 producer Jonas Rivera, as well as a sign for Catmull’s Cream Soda, which is a homage to Pixar co-founder Edwin Catmull.
- Elio:
  - The radio that Elio tries to use to contact the aliens is called a "Domad", a reference to the film's finishing lead directors Madeline Sharafian and Domee Shi.

== Other ==
These Pixar films contain the following references to an assortment of other things.

=== Films ===
- Toy Story 3:
  - Totoro, from Hayao Miyazaki's 1988 film My Neighbor Totoro makes an appearance in Bonnie's room.
  - The number in Trixie's screen name (Velocistar237) is a reference to The Shining. The number 237 also appears on the license plate of the garbage truck.
  - The scene where Woody gets sucked into the cellar is a reference to a similar scene in The Evil Dead.
- Toy Story 4:
  - One of Buzz Lightyear's recorded sayings is "Open the pod bay doors!", a reference to Stanley Kubrick's 2001: A Space Odyssey, where the same line can be heard.
  - At the end of the film, when Duke Caboom jumps in front of a bright full moon, this is a homage to a famous similar shot in E.T.: The Extra-Terrestrial.
- Hoppers:
  - The plot of the film is similar to the Avatar franchise.
  - A skunk and a rabbit being together is similar to those in Disney's classic film Bambi.
- Toy Story 5:
  - "Love is a Song" from Bambi plays during the scene where the Buzz Lightyear army encounters various creatures in the woods.

=== TV shows ===
- Toy Story 3:
  - The lunchbox Buzz grabs in the landfill is of The Six Million Dollar Man.
- Elio:
  - The narrator who shares information about the Voyager spacecraft is voiced by Kate Mulgrew, who played Kathryn Janeway on Star Trek: Voyager.
- Hoppers:
  - Three bears in Mabel's bedroom are modeled after the lead characters from director Daniel Chong's Cartoon Network series We Bare Bears.
- Toy Story 5:
  - Dr. Nutcase, a hysterical toy stolen by a squirrel, is voiced by Matty Matheson, who played Neil Fak in The Bear.

=== Miscellaneous ===
- Toy Story 2:
  - The design of Al's car is based on the Ford Mystere concept car from 1955.
- Monsters, Inc:
  - The scene where Sulley thinks Boo has been crushed in a trash compactor is a reference to Marc Antony the bulldog thinking Pussyfoot has been killed in the cookie batter in the Merrie Melodies short Feed the Kitty.
- Toy Story 3:
  - Above Andy's closet is a street sign for W. Cutting Blvd., the street where Pixar’s original headquarters were located.
  - A pennant on one of Andy's walls reads "P.U.", for Pixar University, a development program for Pixar employees.
  - An application on Andy's bulletin board is for a college in Emeryville, the current location of the Pixar Studios.
- Toy Story 4:
  - The address of the antique store is street number 1200, a reference to the studio's address (1200 Park Avenue, Emeryville, California).
  - Some of the attractions at the fun fair are replicas of the Toy Story Mania attractions at Disneyland and Walt Disney World.
  - When Woody pretends to be a phone in the antiques store, his pose - holding the receiver of an old touchtone phone - resembles the classic Mickey Mouse phone that was ubiquitous in many homes in the 1970s and 1980s.
  - Duke Caboom is strongly inspired by real-life motorcycle stuntman Evel Knievel. His motorcycle is a reference to a toy motorcycle based on Evel Knievel, which, according to the commercials promoting it, was able to do some amazing stunts which it actually couldn't, very similar to Caboom and his motorcycle in the film.
- Onward:
  - One of the candy bars in the gas station's counter is called "Park Avenue", a reference to the studio's address (1200 Park Avenue, Emeryville, California).
- Elio:
  - Montez Middle School's address is "1200", a reference to the studio's address (1200 Park Avenue, Emeryville, California).
- Toy Story 5:
  - When Jessie visits a neighbor's house, one of the forgotten toys in the backyard is a Transformer.
  - Near the end of the film, Jessie says "Jumpin' Jehoshaphat!", the catchphrase used by the Looney Tunes character Yosemite Sam.

== See also ==
- List of fictional universes in animation and comics
- List of filmmaker's signatures
