= CRM114 =

CRM114 may refer to:

- CRM 114 (fictional device)
- CRM114 (program), used for filtering spam
