= See You Next Wednesday (disambiguation) =

See You Next Wednesday is a recurring gag in the films of John Landis.

See You Next Wednesday may also refer to:

- See You Next Wednesday (album), 2021 album by Belly
- See You Next Wednesday (RuPaul's Drag Race), an episode of RuPaul's Drag Race season 16

== See also ==
- See You Next Tuesday (disambiguation)
