= Brad Bird =

American filmmaker, animator, and voice actor (born 1957)

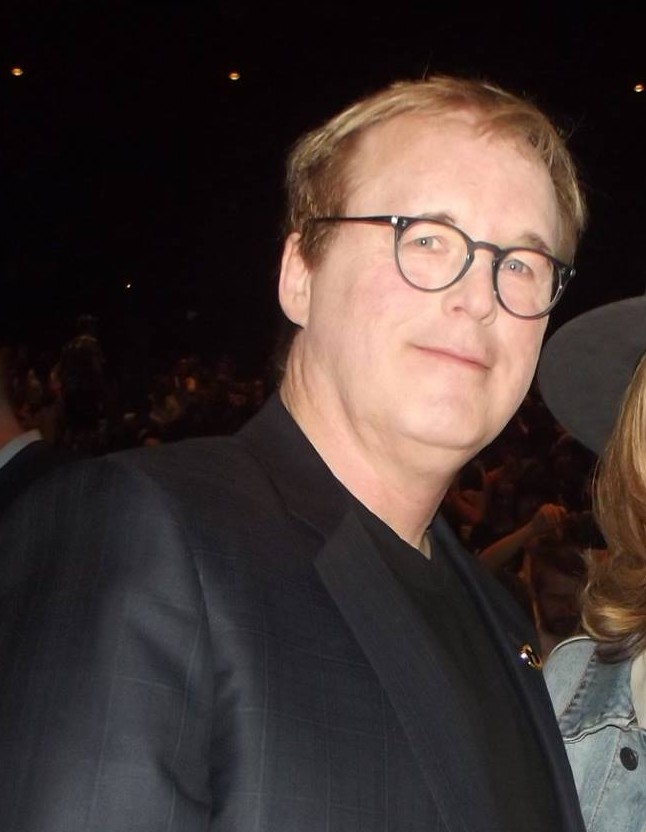
- Bird in 2018
- Born: Philip Bradley Bird; September 24, 1957 (age 69); Kalispell, Montana, U.S.
- Education: California Institute of the Arts (BFA)
- Occupations: Film director; screenwriter; producer; animator; voice actor
- Years active: 1977–present
- Employers: Walt Disney Animation Studios (1978–1984); Amblin Entertainment (1985–1989); Gracie Films (1989–1996); Warner Bros. Feature Animation (1997–2000); Pixar Animation Studios (2000–2018, 2024–present); Skydance (2010–2011, 2021–present)
- Spouse: Elizabeth Canney (m. 1988)
- Children: 3

Philip Bradley Bird (born September 24, 1957) is an American filmmaker, animator, and voice actor. The recipient of two Academy Awards, two BAFTA Awards and ten Annie Awards, he developed an interest in the art of animation early on, and completed his first short subject by age 14. Bird sent the film to Walt Disney Productions, leading to an apprenticeship from the studio's Nine Old Men. He attended the California Institute of the Arts in the late 1970s, and worked for Disney shortly thereafter.

In the 1980s, Bird worked in film development with various studios. He co-wrote Batteries Not Included (1987), and developed two episodes of Amazing Stories for Steven Spielberg, including its spin-off (based on a segment written by Bird for the show), the widely panned animated sitcom Family Dog. Afterwards, Bird joined the animated sitcom The Simpsons as creative consultant for eight seasons. He directed the animated film The Iron Giant (1999); though acclaimed, it was a box-office bomb.

Bird moved to Pixar where he wrote and directed two successful animated films, The Incredibles (2004) and Ratatouille (2007). They earned Bird two Academy Awards for Best Animated Feature wins and Best Original Screenplay nominations. He transitioned to live-action filmmaking with similarly successful Mission: Impossible – Ghost Protocol (2011), he then directed Disney's Tomorrowland (2015). He returned to Pixar to develop Incredibles 2 (2018), which became the second-highest-grossing animated film of all time during its theatrical run, and earned him another nomination for the Academy Award.

Bird has a reputation for supervising his projects to a high degree of detail. He advocates for creative freedom and the possibilities of animation, and has criticized its stereotype as children's entertainment, or classification as a genre, rather than an art.

== Early life ==
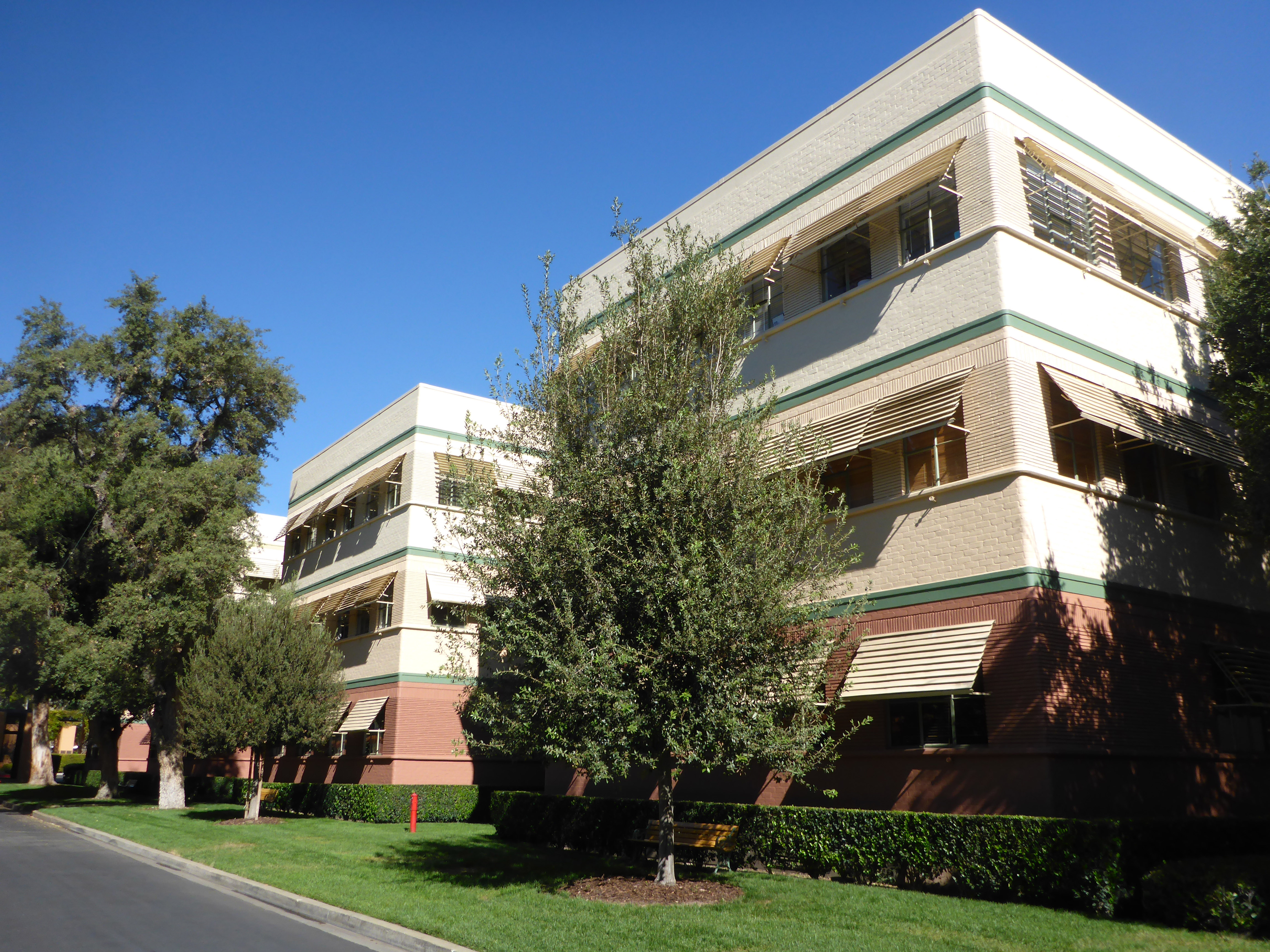
As a teen, Bird was awarded an internship to learn from Walt Disney's Nine Old Men at their California headquarters.

Philip Bradley Bird was born on September 24, 1957, in Kalispell, Montana, the youngest of four children to Marjorie A. (née Cross) and Philip Cullen Bird. His father worked in the propane business, and his grandfather, Francis Wesley "Frank" Bird, who was born in County Sligo, Ireland, was a president and chief executive of the Montana Power Company. Bird's fascination with filmmaking began at an early age. He started drawing at age three, with his first cartoons clear attempts at sequential storytelling. He was particularly enamored with animation after a screening of The Jungle Book (1967), and a family friend who had taken animation classes explained how the medium worked. Bird's father found a used animation camera that could shoot one frame at a time, and helped him set the device up for making films. Bird began animating his first short subject at age 11. In that same year, his family connection introduced him to composer George Bruns, who arranged a tour of Walt Disney Productions in Burbank, California. Bird met the Nine Old Men, the animators responsible for the studio's earliest and most celebrated features, and proclaimed he would join them one day.

Bird has characterized his parents as generous and supportive of his interests. His mother once made a rainy drive two hours each way to the only theater playing a reissue of Snow White and the Seven Dwarfs for Bird's education.

After two years, Bird had completed his first short, a fifteen-minute adaptation of The Tortoise and the Hare. On his parents' advice, to "start at the top and work your way down", he sent the film to his idols at Disney. The studio responded with an open invitation for Bird to stop by whenever in town, which led him to make several visits to the studio's California headquarters in the ensuing years. This opportunity—an "unofficial apprenticeship" of sorts—was "never offered" to anyone previously. He worked closely with Milt Kahl, whom he considered a hero. He began another film, which was more ambitious and in color, but the workload was intense. Instead, Bird focused on other interests in his high school years, including dating, athletics, and photography. "Animation is the illusion of life, and you can't create that illusion convincingly if you haven't lived it," he later remarked. The family relocated to Corvallis, Oregon in his youth, and he graduated from Corvallis High School in 1975.

That year, he was awarded a scholarship by Disney to attend the newly formed California Institute of the Arts (CalArts) in Valencia, California; Bird has joked he was a "retired" animator by the time he received this offer. Instead, he considered attending the acting program at Ashland University. After a three-year break, Bird chose CalArts and moved down south. Bird's classmates included prominent future animators such as John Lasseter, Tim Burton, and Henry Selick. Like many students, they were dazzled by the special effects in Star Wars (1977); both Lasseter and Bird agreed these feats were possible in animation. First-year students met in the room labeled A113—a small, sterile classroom with no windows. Bird later used A113 as an Easter egg in his films; it has since become a fixture of media made by the school's alumni. The first use of A113 was in the pilot episode for the short-lived television series Family Dog (1993). The pilot episode was a part of the series Amazing Stories (1985–1987), which aired February 16, 1987, and was titled "Family Dog". He used it for the license plate number on a van.

== Career ==
=== Development deals and collaboration with Spielberg (1978–1989) ===
Within two years, Bird accepted a job as an animator at Walt Disney Productions. Bird arrived at the studio in the midst of a transition: much of the studio's original creative staff were retiring, leaving the studio to a new generation of artists. What was left of the original staff got along with the newcomers, but Bird clashed with the middlemen in charge. While animating at Disney, he became a part of a small group of animators who worked in a suite of offices inside the original studio called the "Rat's Nest". There, Bird openly criticized the state of the studio, and characterized senior leadership as unwilling to take risk. He felt as though he was standing behind the studio's original principles. This volatile attitude prompted his firing by animation administrator Edward Hansen. He left Disney after only two years; he received credits on The Small One (1978) and The Fox and the Hound (1981), and went uncredited on Mickey's Christmas Carol (1983) and The Black Cauldron (1985).

Bird was dispirited with the state of the American animation industry, and he considered his departure from Disney as the end of his long-held love of the form. Still, he pulled together funds to make A Portfolio of Projects, a demo reel of potential animated projects, ones he felt the medium was capable of. Bird was hopeful of receiving financial backing from other studios, but ended up frustrated by Hollywood's development system: "for every good project I've made, I've got equally good projects that are sitting [un-produced by] various studios," he said in 2018. He relocated to the Bay Area, eager to become a part of its burgeoning film scene, which birthed films like Apocalypse Now and The Black Stallion. A longtime admirerer of Will Eisner's comic book The Spirit, Bird tried for several years to adapt it to feature animation, but studios declined, unwilling to take a risk given Disney's dominance. He briefly attempted a computer-animated film at Lucasfilm with Edwin Catmull, presaging his later work with Pixar. "He had all these ideas for making animated movies, but he didn't have a technical bone in his body and he didn't have any tolerance that you would need to have at the time to put up with some of the awfulness of the early technology," said Alvy Ray Smith. Bird's next credit was as an animator on the dark animated drama The Plague Dogs (1982); he was also fired by the film's director, Martin Rosen, during its production.

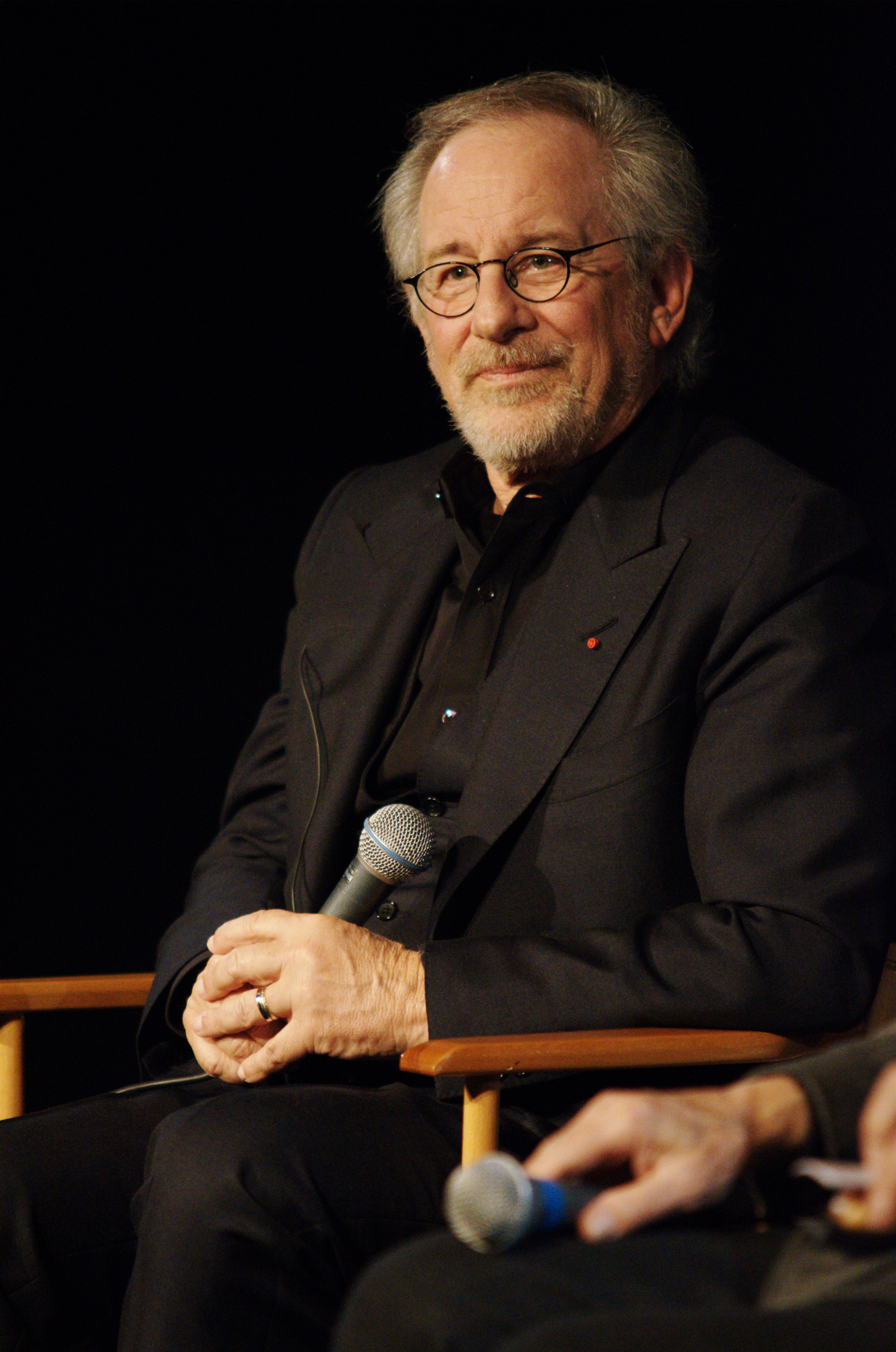
Early in his career, Bird collaborated with director Steven Spielberg.

One piece from his test reel, Family Dog, attracted the attention of director Steven Spielberg. Family Dog centered on a pet's perspective of his dysfunctional suburban family, and its original pencil test featured designs by Bird's classmate Tim Burton. Bird had hoped to develop the concept into theatrical shorts, like those from the golden age of American animation, but the market simply no longer existed. Instead, Bird moved back to Los Angeles and joined Spielberg's Amblin Entertainment, and became involved with his television program Amazing Stories, an anthology series which debuted in 1985. He co-wrote the screenplay for "The Main Attraction", the show's second episode, with Mick Garris. Spielberg enjoyed the script, and invited Bird to pitch other ideas. Bird storyboarded another Family Dog segment, which was decided to be adapted into an episode of Amazing Stories. The episode, which aired in 1987, was a ratings success. The experience was exciting for Bird; "Not only was Steven one of my favorite filmmakers, but he was powerful enough to clear space that allowed us creative freedom," he later remarked. Family Dog was later spun-off into its own half-hour sitcom, against Bird's urging and without his involvement, as he felt the idea would not work. He was also perturbed to see Burton's role in designing the characters overshadow his deeper contributions to the concept.

He was later brought on to co-write the screenplay for Batteries Not Included (1987), a comic sci-fi film that stemmed from an Amazing Stories outline. The film opened in fourth place domestically, and was overall a box office hit, generating $65.1 million on its $25 million budget. Bird also helped with Captain EO, a 3-D short film starring Michael Jackson viewed at Walt Disney theme parks. These successes brought Bird more opportunity, but he continued to spend many years in development hell with studios. He grew irritated with notes from middle management: executives he felt "would analyze your work and dictate everything you'd need to do to make it 'more pleasing to an audience'—and in the process would only make stories smaller and more like everything else," he complained. In his personal life, he wed Elizabeth Canney, an editor on Batteries Not Included. In 1989, Bird's sister Susan, with whom he was very close, was killed by her estranged husband in a murder-suicide. The event was traumatic for Bird; he felt emotionally "kind of gone in that period. I don't really have a lot of memories from it." He had enough funds to support himself for a time, so he simply rested: "I just kind of didn't do anything," he confessed.

=== The Simpsons and The Iron Giant (1989–1999) ===
Bird's cinematic sense of visual storytelling with Family Dog was uncommon in television animation to that point, mainly due to budgetary restrictions. Most television productions retained rudimentary cinematography, with frequent abuse of standard close-ups, medium angles, and establishing shots to move the story along. In contrast, Bird favored using more filmic techniques, using extreme angles, long panning shots, quick camera cuts, pushed perspective, and so on. Bird's work on Family Dog caught the eye of producers James L. Brooks and Sam Simon, who with Matt Groening were developing The Simpsons, the first prime time animated sitcom in decades for Fox. In 1989, Bird was invited to join Klasky Csupo (and later Film Roman), where he served as "executive consultant" for the show. The role required Bird oversee the script-to-animation pipeline 2–3 days per week; the first episode produced on which Bird received credit (save for the reworked cut of the pilot episode "Some Enchanted Evening") was "There's No Disgrace Like Home".

Bird worked on The Simpsons for its first eight seasons (with his final credited episode being "Treehouse of Horror VIII" (1997), the second episode of season nine to be produced), and directed the episodes "Krusty Gets Busted" (1990) and "Like Father, Like Clown" (1991). He also designed the character Sideshow Bob, who made his speaking debut in the former episode. In his role, Bird pushed the show's artists to visualize episodes as miniature films, taking inspiration from the work of Stanley Kubrick and Orson Welles. In the 1990s, he also contributed to other episodic animated sitcoms like The Critic and the first season of King of the Hill, both of which took cues from this established template. Bird called his work at The Simpsons a "golden opportunity", and said the material was more to his sensibility than the work he had done for Disney. He found the work fulfilling; he attended weekly read-throughs which he found delightful, and he considered the gig the only bright spot in the years following his sister's death. The show staff hoped to have Bird direct The Simpsons Movie (2007), but he was busy on Ratatouille, which came out the same year.

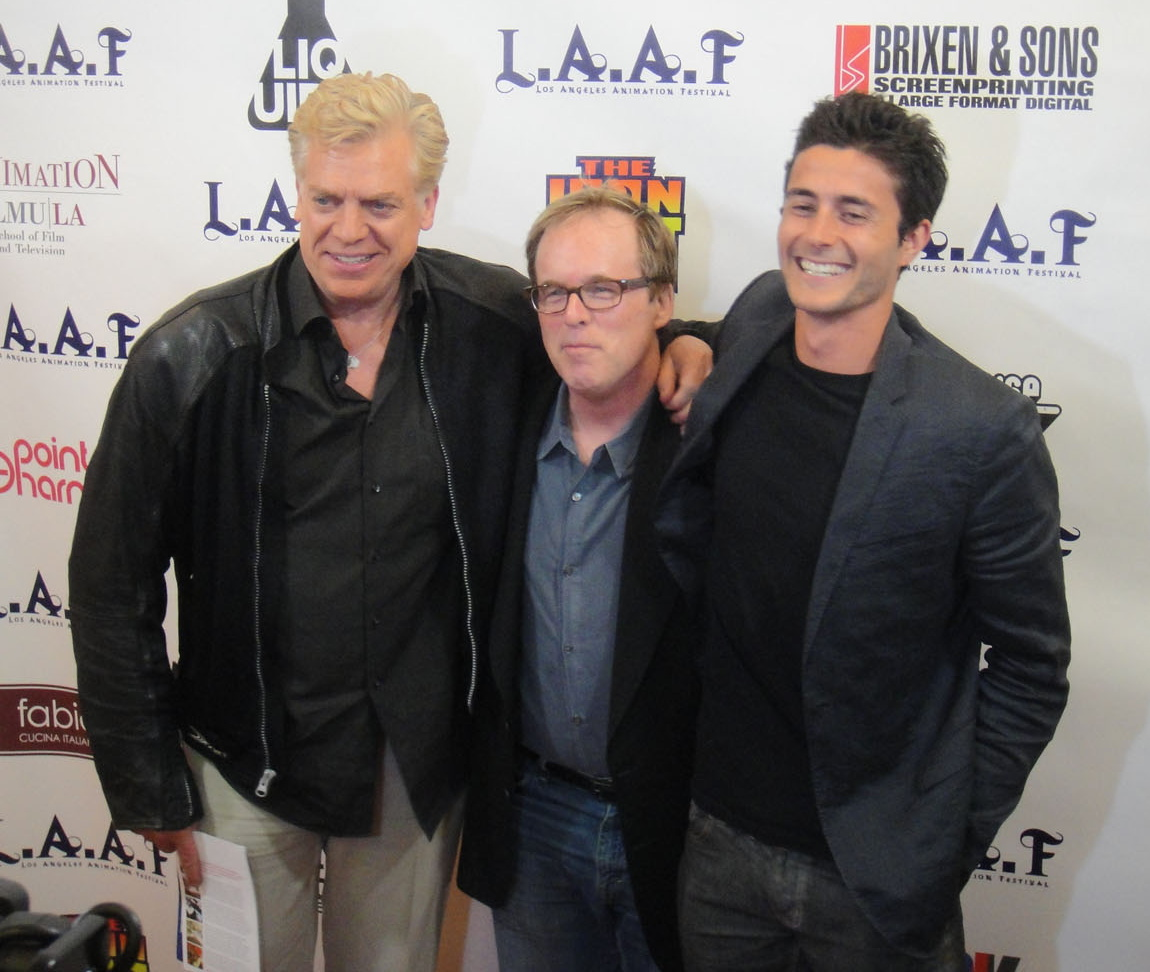
Christopher McDonald, Bird and Eli Marienthal in 2012 at an Iron Giant screening

Animation had a commercial and creative renaissance in the U.S. during the 1990s, with Hollywood studios eager to capitalize on the success of Disney's The Lion King (1994). Bird continued to shop around film ideas to studios throughout the decade, but grew frustrated with his lack of progress in his dream of directing a feature. He was momentarily signed to direct a live-action comedy, Brothers in Crime, at New Line Cinema, but it did not pan out. In addition, his growing family gave rise to other concerns. "I had anxiety about devoting my energy to work that was meaningful and spending time with my family, which was also meaningful to me. If I did one, would I fail at the other?" he worried. He poured these themes into a screenplay for The Incredibles, which he pitched to studios beginning in 1992. He also developed an original sci-fi feature titled Ray Gunn, with a script co-written by Matthew Robbins. Its futuristic story centered on a private detective in an Art Deco world of humans and aliens. Bird signed a production deal with Turner Feature Animation in January 1995, but the studio felt Ray Gunn would be too intense for its target demographic of young children. The following year, Turner merged with Time Warner, which contained the last three months of Bird's contract.

Warner executives set up a meeting, and made it clear they had no interest in Ray Gunn. Instead, they offered Bird several in-development projects, including a musical version of Ted Hughes' novel The Iron Man, first envisioned by the musician Pete Townshend. Bird read the novel and was "enchanted" by it; he was drawn to Hughes' rationale for writing the story, which was to comfort his children after the death of his wife, Sylvia Plath. Bird connected with its themes, relating it to his sister's death from gun violence. He revised the entire story to center on a central question: "What if a gun had a soul?" Warner leadership was sold and Bird signed the contract to direct The Iron Giant in December 1996. Bird penned the screenplay with Tim McCanlies, which centers on a young boy named Hogarth Hughes, who discovers and befriends a giant alien robot during the Cold War in 1957.

He was quickly faced with assembling a team with little time to spare; most big-budget animated films of the era were workshopped for years, whereas Bird only had two. Adding to the pressure was Bird's frequent disagreements with the film's co-producer, Allison Abbate. In a trade-off, the crew received significant creative freedom to make the film they wanted to make, though Bird occasionally fielded suggestions from executives to make the film more merchandisable or kid-friendly. The film scored highly on test screenings, but Warner neglected to secure prominent promotion for the movie as they were promoting Wild Wild West instead. The Iron Giant opened in August 1999 to rave reviews from critics, but very low ticket sales; theater owners discarded the picture after only a few weeks. Altogether, the movie grossed $31.3 million worldwide against its $50 million budget, which was considered a significant loss for Warner. Upon its arrival on home video, the film took on a cult following. Bird was disappointed by the failure of Giant; he visited multiple cineplexes only to view the film in empty auditoriums. Afterwards, he was briefly attached to direct a Curious George adaptation for Universal, but he instead set his sights toward another animation studio: Pixar.

=== The Incredibles and Ratatouille (2000–2008) ===
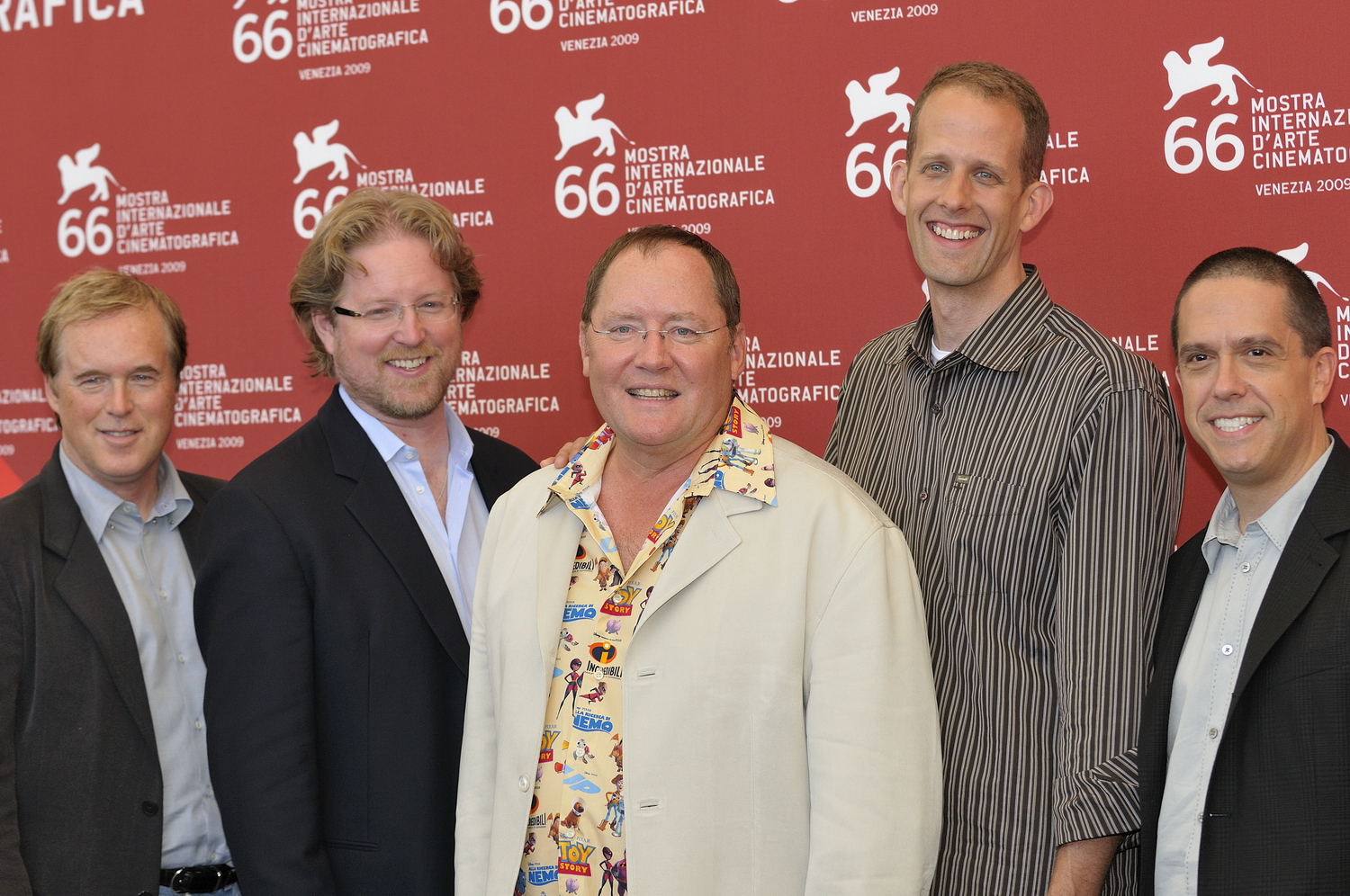
Bird, far left, with Pixar's senior creative team in 2009.

In the late 1990s, Bird collaborated again with his old friend John Lasseter, who went on to work for Pixar, the computer hardware maker that had recently moved into animation. The company released the first fully computer-animated feature film, Toy Story, in 1995. Bird was stunned by the film, and in 1997, the two began to negotiate Bird joining Pixar. In March 2000, Bird went to Pixar's Emeryville, California, campus and pitched his ideas, including The Incredibles, to Lasseter. The studio announced a multi-film contract with Bird in May of that year, making Bird the first outside voice for the studio, which previously required talent to rise through the ranks. He was excited to return to the Bay Area, where he had lived intermittently two decades prior. He purchased a home in Tiburon, across the bay from Pixar's Emeryville headquarters. He grew comforted by the "creative and supportive" atmosphere at Pixar, unlike many of the L.A. Studios he had worked for; he convinced a core team to join him up north, including artists Tony Fucile, Teddy Newton, and Lou Romano, all of whom had contributed development artwork for The Incredibles for much of the past decade.

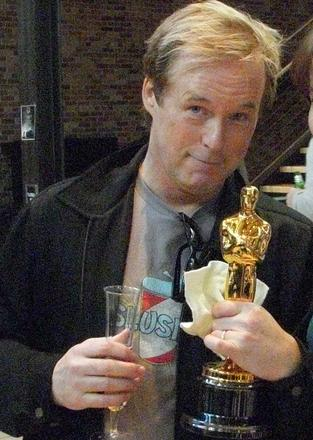
Bird won Academy Awards for both The Incredibles and Ratatouille.

Bird's first film, The Incredibles, follows Bob (Craig T. Nelson) and Helen Parr (Holly Hunter), a couple of superheroes, also known as Mr. Incredible and Elastigirl, who hide their powers in accordance with a government mandate, and attempt to live a quiet suburban life with their three children. Bob's desire to help people draws the entire family into a confrontation with a vengeful fan-turned-foe, Syndrome. Bird also provides the voice of costume designer Edna Mode, which he intended for Lily Tomlin before she convinced him to voice the character. As an inside joke, the character Syndrome was based on Bird's likeness (as was Mr. Incredible) and according to him, he did not realize the joke until the movie was too far into production to have it changed. The animation team was tasked with creating computer animation's first all-human cast, which required creating new technology to animate detailed human anatomy, clothing, and realistic skin and hair. Michael Giacchino composed the film's orchestral score, marking the first in a series of collaborations between the two men. The Incredibles was Bird's first global critical and box-office smash, grossing $631.4 million, making it the fourth-highest-grossing film of 2004. Bird won his first Academy Award for Best Animated Feature, and his screenplay was nominated for Best Original Screenplay. It was the first animated film to win the prestigious Hugo Award for Best Dramatic Presentation.

Bird's next project was Ratatouille (2007), which follows a rat named Remy, who dreams of becoming a chef and tries to achieve his goal by forming an alliance with a Parisian restaurant's garbage boy. The film was developed by Jan Pinkava, who worked on the concept for many years. By the time the project was slated to enter the animation process, Pixar leadership became concerned it was not ready. Bird was hired on in July 2005 to assess the mistakes and turn the project around in a short time. He disliked having to take over Pinkava's passion project: "It was a rough position to be in because I always come down on the side of the creator," he later said. However, he was also in position with Pixar as a member of their "brain trust"—a group of individuals who critique and help each other—so he felt the role came naturally. When Bird took over, much of the design work had been completed, but Bird wrote an entirely new script that eschewed much of its original dialogue. Giacchino returned to compose the Paris-inspired music for the film. Upon release, Ratatouille was another huge hit for Pixar; the film grossed $623.7 million and earned critical acclaim. It won the Best Animated Feature award at the 2008 Golden Globes; it was also nominated for five Academy Awards, including Best Original Screenplay and Best Animated Feature, which it won.

=== Mission: Impossible – Ghost Protocol and Tomorrowland (2008–2015) ===
Midway through the aughts, Bird was attached to direct an adaptation of James Dalessandro's novel, 1906, which chronicles the tumultuous earthquake that struck San Francisco a century prior. Due to the size and scale of such a project, three studios were to finance its making—Pixar, Disney, and Warner Bros.—but the project stalled. He paused when Pixar management asked he take over Ratatouille, and returned afterward. He attempted to rewrite 1906 to fit within the confines of a feature's length, but struggled. Instead, Bird helmed Mission: Impossible – Ghost Protocol, an installment of the action spy series Mission: Impossible, starring Tom Cruise.

Bird's foray into live-action filmmaking after a major career in animation had little precedent, according to critics. Cruise had been impressed by the style and storytelling of Incredibles, and urged Bird to contact him should he venture into the live-action sphere. The idea of combining the commercial aspects of a franchise—this was the third Mission sequel—and more artistic tones challenged Bird, who signed on to direct in May 2010. In the picture, Cruise reprises his role of Impossible Missions Force agent Ethan Hunt, who with his team race against time to find a nuclear extremist who gains access to Russian nuclear launch codes. Ghost Protocol was shot on location partially in Dubai, and includes a memorable scene when Cruise scales the newly erected Burj Khalifa. Upon release in December 2011, it became the highest-grossing film in the series up to that point, with $694 million worldwide. It was the fifth-highest-grossing film of 2011 as well as the second-highest-grossing film starring Cruise.

Though he was asked to direct Star Wars: The Force Awakens, Bird turned down the opportunity to focus on his new project: the sci-fi film Tomorrowland, named for the futuristic themed land found at Disney theme parks. Bird co-wrote the screenplay with Damon Lindelof. In the film, a disillusioned genius inventor (George Clooney) and a teenage science enthusiast (Britt Robertson) embark to an intriguing alternate dimension known as "Tomorrowland," where their actions directly affect their own world. The film ended up being a box-office bomb, losing Disney $120–150 million, and attracting a mixed critical response.

=== Incredibles 2 and Ray Gunn (2015–present) ===
Over the years, Bird mentioned the possibility of an Incredibles sequel in interviews. An official sequel was announced in 2014. Bird began writing its screenplay in earnest the next year; he attempted to distinguish the script from the breadth of superhero-related content released since the first film, focusing on the family dynamic rather than the superhero genre. The story follows the Incredibles as they try to restore the public's trust in superheroes while balancing their family life, only to combat a new foe who seeks to turn the populace against all superheroes. Though scheduled for release on June 21, 2019, the film was completed on an accelerated production schedule, as it was farther ahead in production than Toy Story 4, which required more development and was later released on that day; the two simply swapped years, with Incredibles 2 debuting in theaters on June 15, 2018. Giacchino returned to compose the score.

Incredibles 2 made $182.7 million in its opening weekend, setting the record for best debut for an animated film, and grossed over $1.2 billion worldwide, making it the second-highest-grossing animated film at the time, the highest-grossing Pixar film, and the fourth-highest-grossing film of the year. Incredibles 2 was named by the National Board of Review as the Best Animated Film of 2018. The film was nominated for Best Animated Feature at the 76th Golden Globe Awards and 91st Academy Awards, but lost both awards to Spider-Man: Into the Spider-Verse.

In June 2018, Bird mentioned the possibility of adapting 1906 as a TV series, and the earthquake sequence as a live-action feature film. In July 2026, at the San Diego Comic Con, Bird explained how further research helped him realize that the expansive narrative of corruption, the massive earthquake, and the devastating fire lends itself much better to an eight-episode miniseries format instead of a full-length feature film and claimed he might revive the project entirely.

Following Incredibles 2, Bird left Pixar to develop other projects. In January 2019, Bird revealed details about his development of an original musical film composed by Michael Giacchino that would blend live-action footage with 20 minutes of animation; no further information about the film has been provided since. Bird has also expressed interest in developing an animated Western or horror film. However, Bird returned to revive his long-dormant project Ray Gunn at Warner Bros. Feature Animation before he was approached by John Lasseter to produce it for Skydance. Bird signed a deal with Skydance in 2021 and reassembled frequent collaborators Giacchino, Teddy Newton, Tony Fucile, Darren T. Holmes, Jeffrey Lynch, and John Ratzenberger for the film, which was officially announced by Skydance the following year. According to The Hollywood Reporter, the presumptive production costs were estimated to be $150 million. This resulted in Skydance leaving its distributor deal with Apple TV+, in which they later partnered with Netflix. In joining Skydance, Bird was also part of a Skydance creative brain trust alongside fellow filmmakers including Lasseter, Rich Moore, and Vicky Jenson.

In August 2024, at the D23 Expo, Pixar chief creative officer Pete Docter announced Incredibles 3 was in development, with Bird returning. It was later revealed Bird was returning to write and executive-produce Incredibles 3 but would not direct due to his commitment to Ray Gunn. Peter Sohn was chosen by Bird and Docter to direct the film in Bird's place.

== Style and themes ==
I love all the arts, but I love movies most because they combine so many of them.

— Brad Bird

Bird says he was influenced by dozens of filmmakers, singling out early moviemakers Buster Keaton, Charlie Chaplin, and Harold Lloyd, to mid-twentieth century auteurs like David Lean, Alfred Hitchcock, Walt Disney, and Akira Kurosawa. More contemporary directors like Steven Spielberg, Francis Ford Coppola, Martin Scorsese, George Lucas, Hayao Miyazaki, and the Coen brothers have inspired Bird as well. His passion for the medium was evident even in his college years; friend John Lasseter remembered, "Brad would hang out all night talking about Scorsese and Coppola and how he could do what they did in animation." Bird himself has observed that his career was "very long, very delayed and full of disappointment," mainly because he aspired to "lofty" self-set expectations.

He has been characterized as controlling with an exquisite attention to detail. His "demanding, often punishing" direction has prompted some to consider him difficult to work with. Bird is outspoken about the potential of the art of animation, and has asked the public not refer to his films as cartoons. In the audio commentary for the home release of The Incredibles, Bird joked he would fight the next person to refer to animated movies as a "genre", as opposed to an art form. He has also taken exception to the classification of modern animated fare as solely for children or families; suggesting it discriminatory and belittling. He has expressed a love for hand-drawn animation and lamented its current absence from the industry.

Some critics have suggested that Bird's films reflect novelist Ayn Rand's Objectivism philosophy, which Bird has vehemently denied, saying that, "Me being the Ayn Rand guy is a lazy piece of criticism." Critic A.O. Scott originally advanced the idea that the Incredibles suggested a "feverish immersion" in "the philosophy of Ayn Rand," as the film's hero, Bob Parr, complains of society's "celebration of mediocrity," though Scott also noted the film's climax, in which Bob and his family learn to better serve society with their talents, would repudiate this idea. Some critics later pointed to Tomorrowland, in which a group of geniuses form a society sequestered from the rest of the world, as reminiscent of Atlas Shrugged and its Galt Gulch enclave. David Sims at The Atlantic has suggested Bird's films are instead "stories about the frustrations of unbridled creativity [...] In each film, there's an indelible recurring image: the frustrated genius, locked away in a dusty closet, obsessing over the talents he has to hide."

== Personal life ==
Bird and his wife Elizabeth (m. 1988) have three sons: Nicholas, who voiced Squirt in the Pixar film Finding Nemo and Rusty the bike boy in The Incredibles; Michael, who voiced Tony Rydinger in The Incredibles and its sequel; and Jack. Bird maintains properties in Tiburon, California, and Los Feliz, California.

== Filmography ==
Directed features
Year	Title	Distribution
1999	The Iron Giant	Warner Bros. Pictures
2004	The Incredibles	Buena Vista Pictures Distribution
2007	Ratatouille	Buena Vista Pictures Distribution
2011	Mission: Impossible – Ghost Protocol	Paramount Pictures
2015	Tomorrowland	Walt Disney Studios Motion Pictures
2018	Incredibles 2	Walt Disney Studios Motion Pictures
2026	Ray Gunn	Netflix

== Awards and nominations ==
In addition to his Academy Award, BAFTA Award and Saturn Award wins, Bird holds the record of the most animation Annie Award wins with eight, winning both Best Directing and Best Writing for each of The Iron Giant, The Incredibles and Ratatouille, as well as Best Voice Acting for The Incredibles. His eighth Annie was the 2011 Winsor McCay Award for lifetime contribution to animation.

Organizations	Year	Category	Title	Result
Academy Awards	2005	Best Original Screenplay	The Incredibles	Nominated
Academy Awards	2005	Best Animated Feature	The Incredibles	Won
Academy Awards	2008	Best Original Screenplay (Note: Shared with Jan Pinkava and Jim Capobianco)	Ratatouille	Nominated
Academy Awards	2008	Best Animated Feature	Ratatouille	Won
Academy Awards	2019	Best Animated Feature	Incredibles 2	Nominated
Annie Award	1999	Best Animated Feature	The Iron Giant	Won
Annie Award	1999	Directing in Feature Production	The Iron Giant	Won
Annie Award	1999	Outstanding Writing in a Feature Production (Note: Shared with Tim McCanlies)	The Iron Giant	Won
Annie Award	2004	Best Animated Feature	The Incredibles	Won
Annie Award	2004	Outstanding Directing in Feature Production	The Incredibles	Won
Annie Award	2004	Outstanding Writing in a Feature Production	The Incredibles	Won
Annie Award	2004	Outstanding Voice Acting in a Feature Production	The Incredibles	Won
Annie Award	2008	Best Animated Feature	Ratatouille	Won
Annie Award	2008	Outstanding Directing in a Feature Production	Ratatouille	Won
Annie Award	2008	Outstanding Writing in a Feature Production	Ratatouille	Won
Annie Award	2019	Best Animated Feature	Incredibles 2	Nominated
Annie Award	2019	Outstanding Directing in a Feature Production	Incredibles 2	Nominated
Annie Award	2019	Outstanding Writing in a Feature Production	Incredibles 2	Nominated
BAFTA Children's Award	1999	Best Feature Film (Note: Shared with Allison Abbate, Des McAnuff and Tim McCanlies)	The Iron Giant	Won
BAFTA Film Award	2007	Best Animated Film	Ratatouille	Won
Boston Society of Film Critics	2007	Best Screenplay	Ratatouille	Won
Chicago Film Critics Association	2007	Best Screenplay, Original	Ratatouille	Nominated
Hugo Awards	2000	Best Dramatic Presentation	The Iron Giant (Note: Shared with Tim McCanlies and Ted Hughes (Based upon the book))	Nominated
Hugo Awards	2004	Best Dramatic Presentation	The Incredibles	Won
Hugo Awards	2006	Best Dramatic Presentation	Jack-Jack Attack	Nominated
London Critics Circle Film Awards	2005	Screenwriter of the Year	The Incredibles	Nominated
Los Angeles Film Critics Association	1999	Best Animation	The Iron Giant	Won
Los Angeles Film Critics Association	2004	Best Animation	The Incredibles	Won
Los Angeles Film Critics Association	2007	Best Animation	Ratatouille (Note: Shared with Jan Pinkava)	Won
MTV Video Music Awards	1991	Best Special Effects in a Video	"Do the Bartman"	Nominated
Saturn Awards	2004	Best Writing	The Incredibles	Won
Saturn Awards	2007	Best Writing	Ratatouille	Won
Saturn Awards	2012	Best Director	Mission: Impossible – Ghost Protocol	Nominated
Science Fiction and Fantasy Writers of America	2000	Best Script	The Iron Giant	Nominated
Science Fiction and Fantasy Writers of America	2005	Best Script	The Incredibles	Nominated

== Critical reception ==
Critical response to films Bird has directed:

Film	Rotten Tomatoes	Metacritic	Cinemascore
The Iron Giant	96%	85	A
The Incredibles	97%	90	A+
Ratatouille	96%	96	A
Mission: Impossible – Ghost Protocol	93%	73	A-
Tomorrowland	49%	60	B
Incredibles 2	93%	80	A+
Average	88%	81	A

== Frequent collaborators ==
=== Cast members ===
Bird has cast certain actors and actresses in more than one of the films he has written and/or directed.

Collaborator	Batteries Not Included	The Iron Giant	The Incredibles	Ratatouille	Mission: Impossible – Ghost Protocol	Tomorrowland	Incredibles 2	Ray Gunn	Incredibles 3	Total
Elizabeth Peña	X mark		X mark							2
Frank Thomas		X mark	X mark							2
Ollie Johnston		X mark	X mark							2
Craig T. Nelson			X mark				X mark		X mark	3
Holly Hunter			X mark				X mark		X mark	3
Samuel L. Jackson			X mark				X mark		X mark	3
Teddy Newton			X mark	X mark	X mark	X mark	X mark			5
Eli Fucile			X mark				X mark			2
Maeve Andrews			X mark				X mark			2
Lou Romano			X mark	X mark						2
Sarah Vowell			X mark				X mark		X mark	3
Michael Bird		X mark	X mark				X mark			3
Himself		X mark	X mark	X mark			X mark	X mark		5
Kimberly Adair Clark			X mark				X mark			2
John Ratzenberger			X mark	X mark			X mark	X mark		4
Nicholas Bird			X mark				X mark			2
Peter Sohn			X mark	X mark						2
Patton Oswalt				X mark				X mark		2

=== Crew members ===
Bird has worked with various production crew members on more than one of the films he has written and/or directed.

Collaborator	Batteries Not Included	The Iron Giant	The Incredibles	Ratatouille	Mission: Impossible – Ghost Protocol	Tomorrowland	Incredibles 2	Ray Gunn	Incredibles 3	Total
Matthew Robbins	X mark							X mark		2
Teddy Newton		X mark	X mark	X mark			X mark	X mark		5
Tony Fucile		X mark	X mark	X mark			X mark	X mark		5
Mark Andrews		X mark	X mark	X mark			X mark			4
Peter Sohn		X mark	X mark	X mark			X mark		X mark	5
Lou Romano		X mark	X mark	X mark						3
Jeffrey Lynch		X mark	X mark		X mark	X mark	X mark	X mark		6
John Walker		X mark	X mark			X mark	X mark			4
Darren T. Holmes		X mark		X mark				X mark		3
Michael Giacchino			X mark	X mark	X mark	X mark	X mark	X mark		6
John Lasseter			X mark	X mark			X mark	X mark		4
David Ellison					X mark			X mark		2
Dana Goldberg					X mark			X mark		2

== See also ==
- A113
- Directors with two films rated A+ by CinemaScore

== Bibliography ==
- Paik, Karen (2007). To Infinity and Beyond!. Chronicle Books. ISBN 9780811850124.
- Price, David (2008). The Pixar Touch. New York: Alfred A. Knopf. ISBN 9780307265753.
