= List of filmmakers' signatures =

Some filmmakers include Easter eggs in many of their works, which become signatures or trademarks. These are usually inconsequential small elements like signs which are inside jokes, cameos or references to other works; however, there are several notable exceptions. For this list, the term filmmaker is used loosely and includes directors, producers, actors, animators, and production companies.

- A113 is added by alumni of the California Institute of the Arts, referring to the classroom used by graphic design and character animation students.
- Acme Corporation is a fictional corporation featured in Looney Tunes' Road Runner/Wile E. Coyote cartoons with outlandish products that often fail or backfire.
- CRM 114 was used by Stanley Kubrick, coming from the movie Dr. Strangelove.
  - In Back To The Future one of the knobs that Marty turns to adjust Doc Brown's giant amplifier is labelled "CRM 114".
- Hidden Mickey is a representation of Mickey Mouse that has been inserted subtly into Disney movies and other products.
- Sir Alfred Hitchcock cameos became one of Hitchcock's signatures; and fans would make sport of trying to spot his cameos. Cameos by the director are also a frequent feature of the films of Sir Peter Jackson.
- In most of John Woo's films, a character is often seen using a Beretta 92 handgun.
- Chuck Lorre used unique vanity cards on the end of every episode of his productions.
- Pixar includes several signatures such as A113, Luxo Jr.'s Luxo ball, Toy Story's Pizza Planet Truck, and "good luck charm" John Ratzenberger.
- Stan Lee cameos were a tradition in Marvel Comics films until Lee's death.
- Steven Spielberg's shooting star started by 'accidentally' capturing a meteor in "Jaws", although the accidental nature was later debunked.
- THX 1138 is used by George Lucas and Lucasfilm, and comes from Lucas's first movie THX 1138. Others have used just 1138, probably in reference to Lucas.
- A 1973 Oldsmobile Delta 88 appears in almost all of Sam Raimi's films.
- Billy Wilder used the name “Sheldrake” for white-collar characters in Sunset Boulevard (1950), The Apartment (1960), and Kiss Me, Stupid (1964).
- John Landis includes a poster for or otherwise refers to a fictional film called "See You Next Wednesday" in nearly all of his films.
- Quentin Tarantino often includes fictional brands such as the "Big Kahuna Burger" and "Red Apple" in most of the films he wrote or directed.
- Bruce Timm voices a cameo character in every animated DC film that he produced.
- Spike Lee's films often include his signature double-dolly shot; a surreal, floating effect.

== See also ==
- List of film and television directors
- Fictional brand
- Alan Smithee
- Wilhelm scream
