= Adam Pacitti =

English internet personality (born 1988)

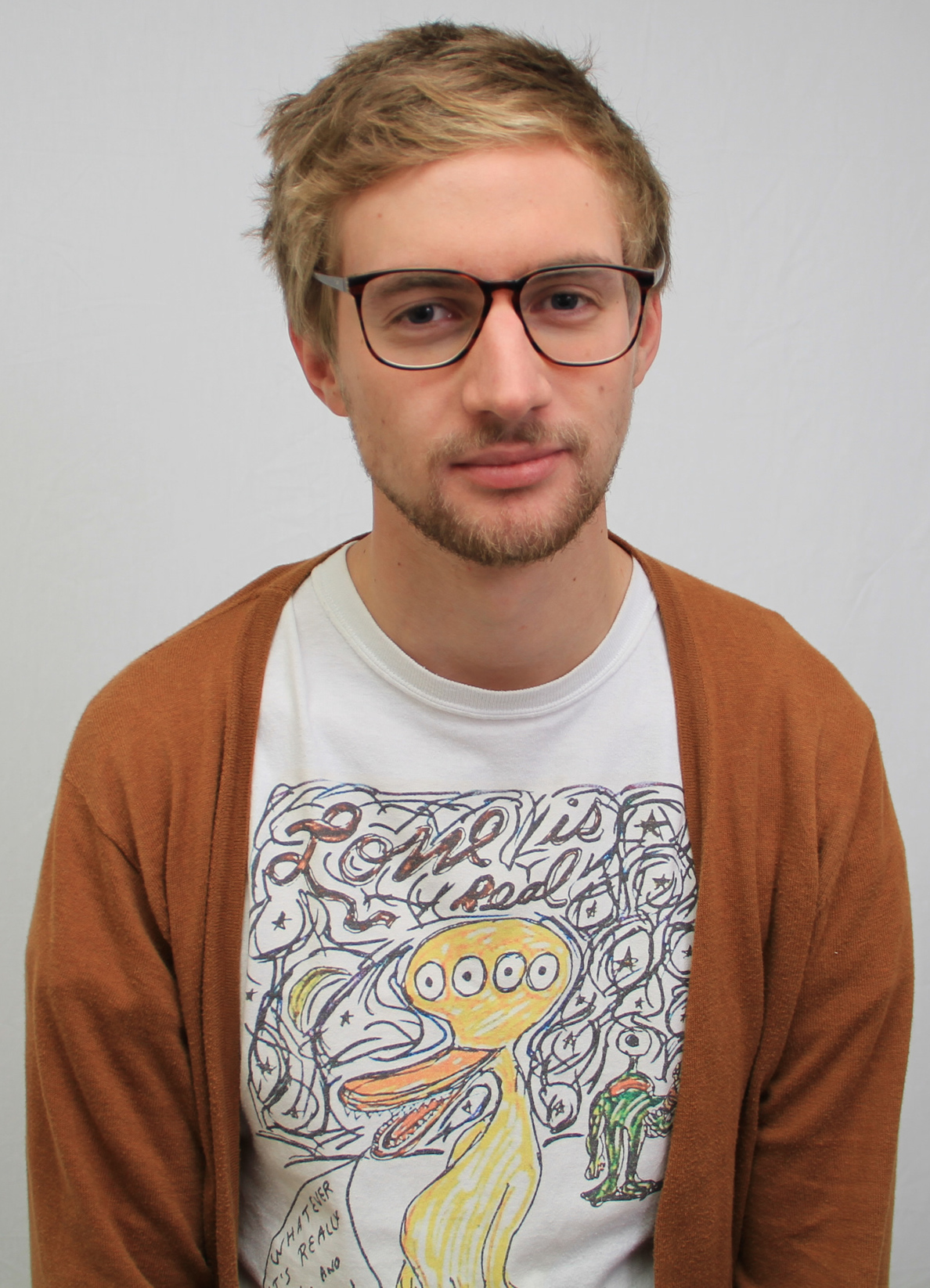
- Born: Adam Joseph Pacitti; 21 August 1988 (age 38)
- Education: University of Winchester
- Occupation: Online streamer
- Years active: 2008–present
- Known for: The Girl of My Dreams, Employ Adam, WhatCulture, Cultaholic

Adam Joseph Pacitti (born 21 August 1988) is an English streamer and former YouTuber, best known for his publicity stunts, and for founding professional wrestling infotainment company Cultaholic.

== Career ==
=== Pre-WhatCulture career ===
==== 2008: The Girl of My Dreams ====
In August 2008, while studying English at the University of Winchester, Pacitti launched an appeal to find "the most beautiful girl he has ever seen" in a dream of his. After the dream, he woke up 'immediately' in the early hours and drew a sketch of the girl, which has drawn comparisons to Ugly Betty. He subsequently created a website where people could log sightings of who they believed were his dream woman, or girls who believed they were her could contact him. The campaign garnered publicity on British television, including The Graham Norton Show, Richard & Judy, and GMTV, and even Australian breakfast programme Sunrise. Pacitti received a book deal for the campaign, in which he would travel around looking for the girl, however the company went into liquidation before the book could be published.

==== 2013–2015: Employ Adam billboard ====
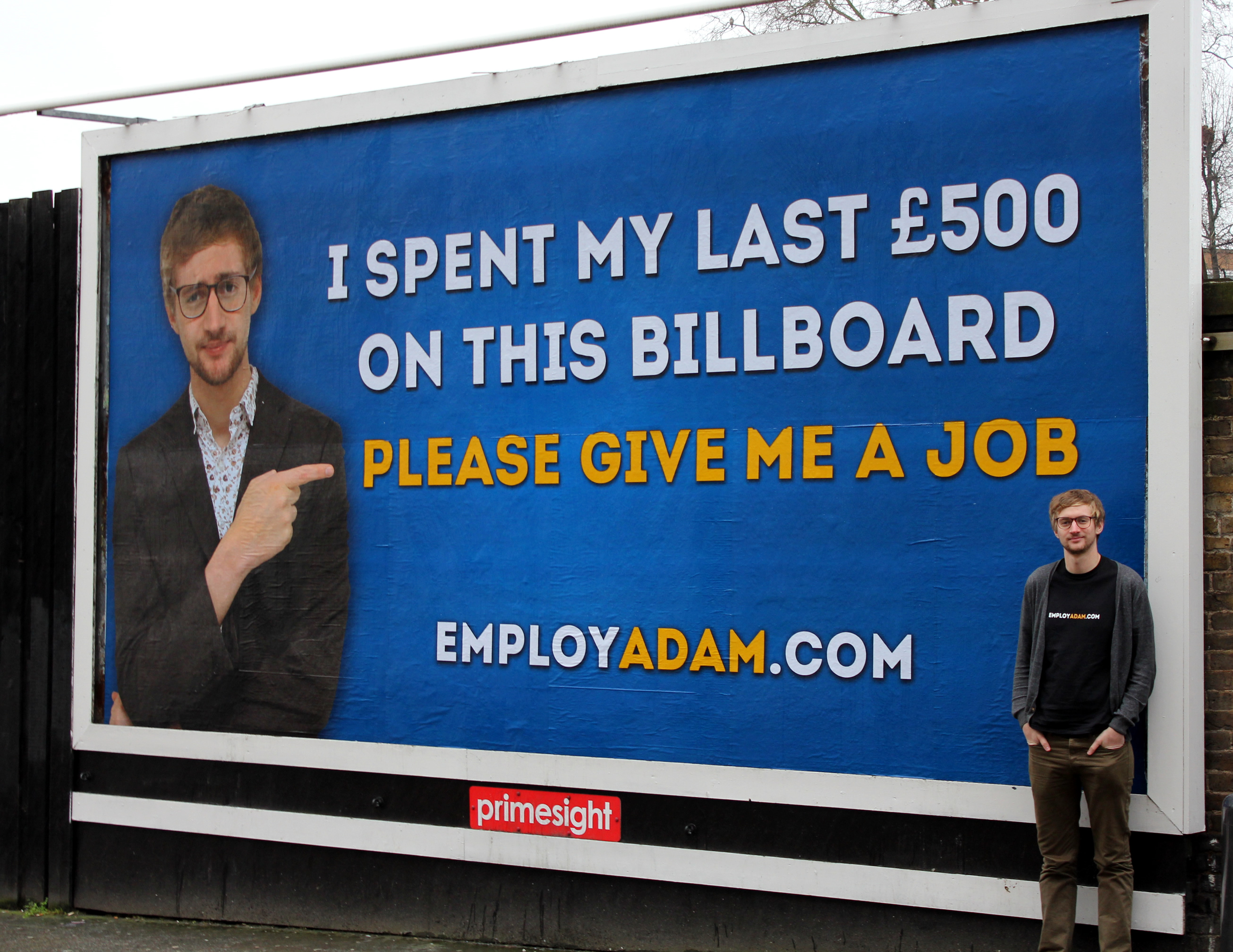
Adam Pacitti with the Employ Adam billboard

In January 2013, when he was an unemployed graduate, Adam spent the last £500 in his bank account on a billboard in Shoreditch, London, in hopes that he would find work from it. It promoted a dedicated campaign website, aptly named employadam.com. The website hosted a tongue-in-cheek video promoting his marketing skills, including his first-class degree in Media Production, to potential recruiters. In one part of the video, Pacitti stated: "I am looking for work in the ultra-competitive, cut-throat and slightly vacuous industry that is the media." He was successful with the stunt, being employed soon after by production company KEO Digital, where he landed a post as a junior producer. In February, one month after, he bought another billboard space, this time thanking people for helping him. It read: "I spent my first wage packet on this billboard. Thank you for helping me." This saw The Times dub him "the poster boy for jobseekers" in a headline.

=== 2015–2017: WhatCulture ===
After departing from KEO, Pacitti joined WhatCulture in 2015 as a video editor, before being quickly transitioned into an on-screen personality for the WhatCulture YouTube channel.

Alongside his co-star, Adam Blampied, Pacitti would star in a YouTube series called ‘Adam Vs Adam’.

==== WhatCulture Pro Wrestling (WCPW) ====
Following the success of the channel, the brand decided to launch their own independent wrestling promotion, named WhatCulture Pro Wrestling (WCPW). Pacitti served as the inaugural general manager, before it was sold and rebranded as Defiant Wrestling, which saw Stu Bennett named as his successor, before it finally folded as a promotion in August 2019, one year and 11 months later.

=== 2017–2025: Cultaholic ===
On 29 September 2017, just one day before WCPW rebranded as Defiant, WhatCulture issued a statement on Twitter announcing that Pacitti, Blampied, Driver, King and Tweddell had all made the decision to part ways with them, and that they would be leaving "in the coming weeks". Two weeks later, on Monday, 16 October, the group launched a new professional wrestling infotainment website and YouTube channel of their own, named Cultaholic. Shortly after the channel was announced, Pacitti's then-colleague Adam Blampied had his contract with Cultaholic terminated "with immediate effect", amidst news of sexual misconduct claims, which Blampied later publicly admitted to in an op-ed for The Independent.

On 11 June 2025, in a joint video statement with Cultaholic's other 3 founding members, Pacitti announced he would be leaving the company on good terms at the end of the month in order to pursue other opportunities.

==== GB News prank ====
On 13 June 2021, a new opinion-orientated television channel named GB News launched. The channel has a right-wing political bias, and upon launching, CNN reported the station were aiming to "take on woke warriors". Four days after its launch, on 17 June, Pacitti – a Labour Party supporter, who has shown support for Jeremy Corbyn and previously criticised the Conservative Party — pranked the station. He appeared live on Tonight Live with Dan Wootton via video chat during a segment with former actor Laurence Fox and political commentator Dan Wootton whilst they were taking questions from the public. Pacitti exclaimed: "Hello. I am a great fan of your work and also a great fan of comedy. I am a man that loves to laugh. I am of the belief that either one can joke about everything or nothing at all because somebody will always be offended by a joke. What are your thoughts on that?", as he was standing directly in front of a mirror and mooning the hosts in the reflection. They did not notice the prank, though viewers did.

==== C U Next Tuesday ====
In 2020, Cultaholic began creating content on Twitch, with Pacitti hosting a streaming series titled "C U Next Tuesday," which airs every Tuesday. Initially conceived as a one-off stream, "C U Next Tuesday" gained popularity as Pacitti presented classic British TV programs for viewers to enjoy alongside him. Despite the apparent deviation from wrestling, the show garnered a substantial and loyal following, with Pacitti noting "if you're passionate about something then that'll come across and it makes things more enjoyable to watch and I'm genuinely quite passionate about this stuff" and that there's "a level of unpredictability that only 90s British TV shows can offer." The title of the series is a backronym for the word "cunt", in line with other similar uses of the phrase "See You Next Tuesday".

=== 2025–present: Independent streamer ===
On 7 October 2025, Pacitti announced that he would return to streaming full time as an independent streamer, unaffiliated with Cultaholic. He continued his ‘C U Next Tuesday’ series, as well as adding additional weekly shows in the form of ‘Patch Notes’, and ‘Raised By The Internet’.

While primarily using Twitch as his streaming platform, Pacitti also hosts exclusive streams to subscription members of his Patreon.

== Personal life ==
Pacitti lives and works in the Gateshead and Newcastle upon Tyne area. He was born and raised in Ryde on the Isle of Wight.

In 2012, Pacitti graduated from university with a first-class degree in media production.
