= Your Friend the Rat =

2007 Pixar short film

- Poster
- Directed by: Jim Capobianco
- Written by: Jim Capobianco
- Story by: Jeff Pidgeon; Alexander Woo
- Produced by: Ann Brilz
- Starring: Patton Oswalt; Peter Sohn
- Narrated by: Tony Russel
- Edited by: Steve Bloom
- Music by: Alex Mandel(score); James G. Dashe (song)
- Production company: Pixar Animation Studios
- Distributed by: Walt Disney Studios; Home Entertainment
- Release date: November 6, 2007 (with DVD/Blu-ray)
- Running time: 11 minutes
- Country: United States
- Language: English

Your Friend the Rat is a 2007 American animated short film by Pixar, written and directed by Jim Capobianco. The special takes on the form of an educational film and stars rats Remy and Emile, the main protagonists of Ratatouille, who argue for the reconciliation of humans and rats. They use historical facts presented via various styles of animation in a style similar to the Adventures in Music shorts, Melody and Toot, Whistle, Plunk and Boom.

This is Pixar's only special to feature traditional animation; at eleven minutes, it is also the 3rd longest Pixar special to date. Along with 2D animation, the short also includes stop-motion animation, computer-generated imagery (CGI) and live-action, much like the children's television show, A Little Curious.

Like Ratatouille, Your Friend the Rat also features a musical sequence. This is also Pixar's only special to have a cameo of a protagonist of a film that would be released a year later, which was a cameo of WALL-E. Your Friend the Rat won the category of Best Animated Short Subject at the 35th Annual Annie Awards.

The short was not released in Japan until 2026 (due to the short containing comedic use of live-action footage of the Atomic Bomb).

== Plot ==
The special starts in with Remy introducing himself and his brother Emile to the audience and speaking on behalf of oppressed rats everywhere. Emile starts frowning about having to speak out, while Remy pulls a scroll and a two-dimensional animation starts by presenting the relation between a human and a rat in contrast with human/dog and human/cat relationships.

Remy points out that humans regarded rats in former times as sacred and luck-bringing. He mentions their sacredness in India for being the transport vehicle of the Hindu god Ganesh. He also says that during the Roman Empire, it was believed that a white rat crossing your path would bring good luck, while a black rat crossing your path would bring bad luck.

He moves on to discussing black rats (Rattus rattus) and their connection to the Black Death, pointing out that it was caused by fleas instead of rats, resulting in the death of one third of Europe's population, and just as many rats. Remy further presents the brown rat's (Rattus norvegicus) history, mentioning their part in ending the Black Death and their honorable position in the Chinese zodiac.

The symbiotic relationship between rats and humans is introduced before the second appearance of Remy and Emile in 3D animation. Emile pulls a scroll from the side and presents, through 2D animation all the interesting things rats could do and the benefits of rats for humans. He says that Jack Black was a rat catcher for Queen Victoria and that he kept the rats he captured as pets.

Their use for laboratory testing and as pets show that they can have a good relationship with humans. Concluding the presentation, Emile and Remy sing “Plan B” (a song about the relationship between rats and humans).

At the film's end, Remy attempts to ask the audience if rats and humans can make peace with each other. However, he is interrupted when a long and drawn-out (mostly satirical) disclaimer is shown asking children to stay away from rats, while Remy and Emile stand in front of it and try to remove it, urging the audience to ignore the warning and complaining about freedom of speech and lack of food.

== Cast ==
- Patton Oswalt as Remy, a bluish gray coloured rat, who complains about the way people treat rats.
- Peter Sohn as Emile, a brown rat. He loves to eat and sing, and seems to complain about the same subject as Remy does.
- Lou Romano as Linguini, who appears in 2D primarily to depict the majority of human characters in different costumes.
- Tony Russel as the Disclaimer Guy, the narrator saying the disclaimer at the end of the short.
- John Ratzenberger (uncredited) as P.T. Flea, a character from A Bug's Life who makes a cameo in the short, appearing when the rats discuss fleas causing the Black Death.
- Sigmund Vik as Norwegian Rat
- Jim Capobianco as the off-screen director, who complains that the script does not go right.

== Production ==
The 2D style of the short film depicting a fancy woman walking a rat as a pet

The idea of a 2D short was initiated by Jim Capobianco after Brad Lewis sent an email asking for extras for the DVD. Capobianco thought of an educational film bringing together all the information they gathered about rats in a funny way to the audience. The production of the short started during the last year of the Ratatouille production time and was finished in less than a year.

The animation is a mixture of CGI and 2D animation. Emile and Remy appear in CGI while their presentation is in 2D, which encompasses most of the short movie. The 2D animation in most scenes was done through traditional paper-based animation with digital ink and paint while a few scenes such as the Canada vs. Rats video game were done in Toon Boom. There is also a snippet of live-action film, a clip showing an Oriental rat flea.

During the production, a book called Your Friend the Rat: A Little Golden Book, which includes the music and lyrics to the song "Plan B," was created by Jim Capobianco.

== See also ==
- List of Pixar film references
- Our Friend the Atom
