= CRM 114 (fictional device) =

Fictional device in Dr. Strangelove

The CRM 114 on the B-52 in Dr. Strangelove

The CRM 114 Discriminator is a fictional piece of radio equipment in Stanley Kubrick's film Dr. Strangelove (1964), the destruction of which prevents the crew of a B-52 from receiving the recall code that would stop them from dropping their hydrogen bomb payloads onto Soviet territory. The device is one of several that malfunction in the film, along with Mandrake's telephones, the bomb doors failing to open and the Doomsday Weapon's misuse, a common theme in Kubrick's work of the failure of human planning.

The code became a running joke, in Kubrick's work and outside. Kubrick used a near homophone of "CRM 114", "Serum 114", for the name of a drug injected into Alex to help his reformation in A Clockwork Orange (1971). In the movie Eyes Wide Shut (1999), the morgue Bill visits is stationed in the hospital's corridor C, Room 114 (CRM 114).

The creators of the film Back to the Future also included an homage to Kubrick in the opening scene, as Marty powers up the sound amplifier and a sticker identifies the piece of equipment as the CRM 114.

== Real-life parallels ==
In Peter George's novel, Red Alert (1958), which was the basis for the film, the device is called the CRM 114. George was well-informed; under the U.S. military Joint Electronics Type Designation System (The "AN" System), CRM is the designator for an air-transportable cargo (C) radio (R) maintenance or test assembly (M) and 114 is a feasible series number. If the CRM 114 were a U.S. military item, its official number would be AN/CRM-114.

To ensure the enemy cannot plant false transmissions and fake orders, the CRM 114 is to be switched into the receiver circuit prior to receiving attack or attack cancellation orders. The three code letters of the period are to be set on the alphabet dials of the CRM 114, which will then block any transmissions other than those preceded by the set letters from being fed into the receiver.

Kubrick corresponded with George in 1963, while preparing the film, to make sure that the failure of the CRM 114 device could credibly interfere with the recall of an aircraft. George, who talked with a contact in the military, wrote, "Based on his and another expert's opinions, I am of the opinion that there is in fact no practical way of demonstrating inability to recall the bombers other than by the introduction of a device such as the CRM 114".

Prior to the introduction of addressed digital communications, some analog communications systems performed a function very similar to the fictional CRM 114. Some aircraft radios used SELCAL (selective calling), which muted the receiver unless an assigned tone was received. Ground mobile radios used a similar system called CTCSS (Continuous Tone-Coded Squelch System); this continues to be used in non-professional systems such as Family Radio Service (FRS) and PMR446.

== See also ==
- THX 1138
- A113
- List of filmmaker's signatures
