= Family Dog (TV series) =

1993 American-Canadian adult animated sitcom

- Genre: Comedy
- Created by: Brad Bird
- Written by: Brad Bird (short); Paul Dini; Dennis Klein; Sherri Stoner (series)
- Directed by: Brad Bird (short); Chris Buck (series)
- Voices of: Stan Freberg; Annie Potts; Mercedes McCambridge; Brad Bird; Scott Menville; Brooke Ashley; Marshall Efron; Stanley Ralph Ross; Jack Angel (short); Martin Mull; Molly Cheek; Danny Mann; Zak Huxtable Epstein; Cassie Cole; Bruce McGill; Deanna Oliver; Mary Kay Bergman (series)
- Theme music composer: Danny Elfman
- Composer: Steve Bartek
- Countries of origin: United States; Canada
- Original language: English
- No. of seasons: 1
- No. of episodes: 13 (3 unaired)

Production
- Executive producers: Steven Spielberg; Tim Burton; Dennis Klein
- Producer: Chuck Richardson
- Production companies: Amblin Television; Tim Burton Productions; Warner Bros. Television; Universal Television; Nelvana Limited

Original release
- Network: CBS
- Release: June 23 – July 28, 1993

Related
- Amazing Stories; Capitol Critters; Fish Police

Family Dog is an adult animated sitcom created by Brad Bird for CBS. It is based on a 1987 episode of Amazing Stories. It originally aired for a single season with thirteen episodes with 3 unaired, from June 23 to July 28, 1993. The series was about an average suburban family, the Binsfords, as told through the eyes of their dog named Jonah. The series was the first collaboration between executive producers Steven Spielberg and Tim Burton. It was also the first adult animated television series produced by Nelvana, after the 1983 film Rock and Rule and predating Bob and Margaret.

While the original Amazing Stories episode by Bird was praised, the series, which was delayed for years and made without Bird's involvement, was panned by critics and is considered one of the worst animated television series of all time; one critic called it "one of the biggest fiascos in television animation history, on both a creative and commercial level, in spite (but, in many ways, because) of the high-powered talent behind the project". One critic observed that the main problem with the show was that "the Binsford family was so repulsively selfish to the main protagonist that audience interest in their adventures was nil".

== Cast and characters ==
=== 1987 short ===
- Stan Freberg as Skip Binsford, the father
- Annie Potts as Bev Binsford, the mother
- Brad Bird as Jonah, a Bull Terrier and the family dog
- Scott Menville as Billy Binsford, the son
- Brooke Ashley as Buffy Binsford, the daughter
- Mercedes McCambridge as Miss Lestrange
- Marshall Efron as Burglar
- Stanley Ralph Ross as Burglar
- Jack Angel as Security Guard

=== 1993 series ===
- Martin Mull as Skip Binsford, the father
- Molly Cheek as Bev Binsford, the mother
- Danny Mann as Jonah, a Bull Terrier and the family dog
- Zak Huxtable Epstein as Billy Binsford, the son
- Cassie Cole as Buffy Binsford, the daughter

==== Recurring ====
- Bruce McGill as Martin Mahoney
- Deanna Oliver as Trish Mahoney
- Mary Kay Bergman as Katie, a female Chihuahua and neighbor's dog who Jonah has a crush on.

== Episodes ==
No.	Title	Directed by	Original release date
1	"Show Dog"	Chris Buck and Clive A. Smith	June 23, 1993
The Binsfords enter Jonah in a rodeo showcase of the stars, believing him to be specially talented. Meanwhile, all Jonah wants is a drink of water.
2	"Hot Dog at the Zoo"	Clive A. Smith	June 23, 1993
When the Binsfords take a trip to the zoo, their dog tags along and causes plenty of trouble.
3	"Doggone Girl Is Mine"	Clive A. Smith	June 30, 1993
When Al, an arrogant neighbor, takes his female chihuahua Katie for a walk, it happens: Jonah picks up the scent and is so enthusiastic about the female dog's scent that he only has one goal in mind – he has to get to know Katie. He manages to get Skip to a small exit, and indeed the two of them run into Al and Katie. To his great delight, the dog finds that his affection is mutual: Katie lovingly licks his face. At night, the four-legged friend in love sneaks into Al's house to bring his dream woman an old bone. After Katie has accepted his token of love, he returns home satisfied. What he doesn't know: Al wants to move to South Dakota next morning because of his divorce.
4	"Enemy Dog"	Clive A. Smith	July 7, 1993
When the pretentious Mahoneys pick up a vicious police dog from an auction, the Binsfords force their pooch to interact with it.
5	"Eye on the Sparrow"	Chris Buck and Clive A. Smith	July 7, 1993
Jonah cares for a sparrow who is unable to fly.
6	"Call of the Mild"	Chris Buck and Clive A. Smith	July 14, 1993
Jonah the family dog dreams of cavorting with the neighborhood strays, but he soon discovers that he does not have what it takes to run with the pack.
7	"Dog Days of Summer"	Chris Buck and Clive A. Smith	July 21, 1993
Jonah has a sweet dream: his long-dead parents are visiting and he proudly shows them around his home. Suddenly, the vicious neighbor's dog appears. While the family dog takes shelter in his kennel, his parents disappear, deeply disappointed by their son's cowardice – end of the dream. The next day, the Binsfords head to the beach; they are forced to contend with a trashy group of teens and their vicious bulldog, Scud.
8	"Party Animal"	Chris Buck and Clive A. Smith	July 21, 1993
After hosting the neighborhood block party, the Binsfords' house catches on fire.
9	"Family Dog Goes Homeless"	Klay Hall	July 28, 1993
Jonah the family dog befriends a homeless woman.
10	"Family Dog Gets Good and Sick"	Becky Bristow	July 28, 1993
After a neighborhood dog is run over, the traumatized family pet tries to distract himself by dreaming about his old love, Katie. However, he is bitten by a mosquito contaminated with toxic waste. The Binsfords bring their sick and aggressive four-legged friend to the vet – where the little dog can hardly believe his eyes: in the vet's waiting room he sees Katie with her master Al. After receiving a powerful shot against his infection, the befuddled Jonah is brought home, where he soon falls peacefully asleep in his kennel. Meanwhile, a small plane just over the Binsfords' property experiences engine trouble. The plane crashes – and Al, the owner of the plane, lands on the Binsfords' roof. Meanwhile, Katie lands right next to Jonah's kennel and escapes from her cage. She tries in vain to wake up her friend who is pumped full of medication. Finally, without further ado, Katie lies down next to him, happy to be reunited with her great love.

== Production ==
=== Background ===
TV Guide advertisement for original episode

In the original Amazing Stories episode, which aired in the show's second season in 1987, a dog named Jonah (a Bull Terrier simply called "the dog" who is voiced by Brad Bird) is the main character, portrayed in three stories:

The first story involves general misadventures around the house, with Jonah ignored and somewhat mistreated by his owners, originally named the Binfords (voiced by Stan Freberg, Annie Potts, Scott Menville, and Brooke Ashley).

The second part is a Christmas "home movie", narrated by the family, that culminates with Jonah eating the ham.

In the final and longest segment, a couple of burglars (voiced by Marshall Efron and Stanley Ralph Ross) break into the house while the family is out seeing a movie. When Jonah fails to protect the house from the thieves a second time, the father sends him to Gerta LeStrange's Dog Obedience School run by Gerta LeStrange (voiced by Mercedes McCambridge), so he can learn how to become a "quivering, snarling, white-hot ball of canine terror". The burglars hit the house yet again and flee from the now-aggressive dog, but return to their hideout to discover him still clamped to one thief's arm with his teeth. A police officer (voiced by Jack Angel) investigating the robberies raids the house and is immediately attacked by the dog. The burglars decide to use Jonah in their heists, earning them (and the dog) fame as the "Dog Gang". Jonah finally turns on the criminals, causing an auto accident in which they hit a police car and are busted. Jonah is returned to the Binford family, who now consider him their hero. In a final gag, the father, locked out of the house, sneaks into the backyard, where he's attacked by the dog, duly defending the property.

Written and directed by Brad Bird, with music by Danny Elfman and Steve Bartek, it was one of the most popular episodes of the Amblin Television/Universal Television weekly anthology television series, Amazing Stories. The story was animated by Dan Jeup, Ralph Eggleston, Chris Buck, Sue Kroyer, Gregg Vanzo, David Cutler, Rob Minkoff, Alan Smart, and Darrell Rooney from an animation production design by Tim Burton. The animation production was outsourced to Hyperion Pictures (then under The Kushner-Locke Company), and was shot in Sydney, Australia by Cinemagic Animated Films under animation director Cam Ford, with Kim Humphries as camera operator.

Spielberg's choice to make the episode using animation - especially combining the expense of high-quality animation with well-known voice actors - was considered risky and bold at the time. The first half of the special was later attached to the theatrical release of another Spielberg-produced project, The Land Before Time, because of the film's short length of just over an hour.

This short was the first time the Easter Egg A113 was ever used. Brad Bird used it on the license plate on the van and has since hidden it in every film he has directed. The Easter Egg has been popularized by Pixar films.

=== Development ===
Six years after the original Amazing Stories episode, a CBS series based on the episode was produced by Steven Spielberg and Tim Burton (who contributed to the production and character designs). It was written by Dennis Klein, Sherri Stoner and Paul Dini, and animated by Nelvana (who animated another Universal and Amblin show, Fievel's American Tails), but notably lacked the involvement of the original writer and director, Brad Bird, because he did not believe the short's premise would work as a television show. Largely hyped due to Spielberg's involvement, the series was plagued by production delays. It did not get past its original network order of 13 episodes. Ten episodes were finished by the Wang Film Productions animation house in Taiwan but the producers were dissatisfied with the results, so they halted production on the final three episodes and outsourced the ten episodes to Nelvana for "fixes and completions". The series was scheduled to debut on March 20, 1991 (and it was heavily promoted during the February 1991 broadcast of the Grammy Awards), but the animation was not completed in time for this premiere, so the series was ultimately pushed back until 1993. Frederick Coffin was originally cast as the voice of Skip Binsford, but Spielberg decided to replace him with Martin Mull, after animation was completed on the first three episodes. The budget for each episode rose from $650,000 to $1 million.

Despite the Amazing Stories short airing two months before the launch of the new Fox network and the original The Simpsons shorts as part of The Tracy Ullman Show, Family Dog eventually was lumped into a category of failed primetime animated series produced for the "Big Three" networks to compete with The Simpsons, alongside ABC's Capitol Critters and CBS's own Fish Police. Every program was canceled after only a few weeks. CBS burned off Family Dog in six weeks in the summer of 1993.

== Broadcast ==
Family Dog aired on CBS from June 23-July 21 of 1993.

== Home media ==
Complete series LaserDisc cover

The entire series was released as a LaserDisc box set, and various episodes of the show were released on VHS around the same time.

== Reception ==
The original short has been praised by critics alongside the likes of veteran animators Bill Melendez and Bob Kurtz.

When the show debuted, it was roundly panned for its crude scripts and cheap production values, both of drastically lesser quality than the episode which had spawned the series. It became a cult disaster.

== Video game ==
The show was adapted into a Super NES video game about the life of an everyday family dog. The player has to go three places such as the home where the dog lives, a dog pound and the woods to defeat stereotypical obstacles and enemies like a dog catcher and a cat.

Time Extension listed Family Dog as one of the worst SNES games.
