= See You Next Wednesday =

Recurring gag in oeuvre of John Landis

See You Next Wednesday is a recurring gag in most of the films directed by John Landis, usually referring to a fictional film that is rarely seen and never in its entirety. Most instances of See You Next Wednesday in Landis's films are different films, ranging from thrillers to sci-fi to adult movies.

Landis got the title See You Next Wednesday from the 1968 film 2001: A Space Odyssey. It is the last line spoken by Frank Poole's father during Poole's video letter from his parents.

== References in Landis's works ==
- In Landis's first film, Schlock (1973), See You Next Wednesday is mentioned twice and is also shown as a poster. Brief casting and plot descriptions are given each time that it is mentioned, making it clear that this is in fact two different films, both titled See You Next Wednesday.
- In the sketch comedy film The Kentucky Fried Movie (1977), the film is a melodrama presented in "Feel-Around," a technique where an usher stands behind each movie patron and does things to them as they occur in the film, enhancing the movie-going experience, at least until the scene where the woman puts a knife to the man's throat.
- See You Next Wednesday billboard as seen in The Blues Brothers
  In The Blues Brothers (1980), See You Next Wednesday is glimpsed on a billboard which also features a huge gorilla. It also appears on the cinema sign behind where the Nazi Pinto crashes through the road. It also says under the title on the marquee "Starring Donald Sutherland". Since Sutherland took $50,000 cash for his role in the Landis film Animal House instead of the offered 15%, he missed out on millions when the film became a huge hit. The film is directed by the fictional Carl La Fong, a reference to the W. C. Fields comedy It's a Gift (1934) and a character name that Landis has used as an anonymous credit on some of his other films.
- In An American Werewolf in London (1981), See You Next Wednesday is a porn film being shown in a seedy London pornographic theater. Advertised as "A Non-Stop Orgy", scenes from the movie are actually shown as the characters talk in the theater. A poster of See You Next Wednesday can also be seen on the wall in the Tube station.
- At the end of Coming Soon (1982) there is a series of clips from recent Universal Studios film trailers with the final being watercolor poster art for See You Next Wednesday, followed by Jamie Lee Curtis giggling at the inside joke.
- In Trading Places (1983), a poster for See You Next Wednesday is glimpsed in Ophelia's (Jamie Lee Curtis) apartment. On this poster it is directed by William Wyler and stars Laurence Olivier, Merle Oberon and David Niven (the real director and stars of the 1939 version of Wuthering Heights). The poster features the quote L'un des 10 meilleurs Films du Monde ("One of the 10 Best Movies in the World").
- In the music video for Michael Jackson's Thriller (1983), the phrase is spoken by a deputy sheriff in the werewolf film that Michael and his girlfriend are watching. It is also visible as a poster on the outside of the cinema as they leave.
- In the "Time Out" segment in Twilight Zone: The Movie (1983), an SS officer says "see you next Wednesday" in German.
- In Spies Like Us (1985), a U.S. Army recruiting poster can be seen behind Colonel Rhumbus (Bernie Casey) right after the vertical impact simulation scene that says "The army can teach you a skill. See You Next Wednesday."
- In Into the Night (1985), posters for the movie are shown.
- In Coming to America (1988), a poster for See You Next Wednesday is shown on a New York City Subway station. It stars Dan Aykroyd, Sybil Danning, Jamie Lee Curtis, Moe Howard, James Brown, and Kara Young.
- In the first episode of the 1990 TV series Dream On (which Landis directed), Martin (Brian Benben) says to his maid (Marianne Muellerleile), "See you next Thursday". She corrects him saying, "Wednesday".
- In the music video Black or White (1991), Michael Jackson throws a garbage can through the window of "See You Next Wednesday Storage Co."
- In Innocent Blood (1992), See You Next Wednesday is shown on a marquee.
- In The Stupids (1996), the phrase is seen on the back of the bus to which the kids chain their bikes.
- In the Masters of Horror episode "Family" (2006), the phrase is spoken by a cartoon character on TV.

== References in non-Landis works ==
- In the "Video Pirates" segment of Amazon Women on the Moon (1987), pirates find a treasure chest filled with golden video cassettes; among the numerous in-jokes visible on the tapes, one of the cassette cases is labeled "See You Next Wednesday" (while Landis directed several segments of the film, the "Video Pirates" segment was directed by frequent Landis collaborator Robert K. Weiss). The movie poster of the An American Werewolf in London version of SYNW (the Non-Stop Orgy) is in the Tower Records store in the last sketch of the movie.
- In the video game Deus Ex, an email found on Paul Denton's computer contains a notice from a movie rental company, mentioning the movies See You Next Wednesday and Blue Harvest.
- In the video game NetHack, the phrase "See you next Wednesday" can appear as graffiti on the floor.
- In the movie Win a Date with Tad Hamilton!, when Pete (Topher Grace) is flipping channels while Rosalee (Kate Bosworth) is on a date with Tad Hamilton (Josh Duhamel), a TV advertisement shows Hamilton riding a motorcycle over a hill, then drinking a soda while a Spanish-language voiceover says "¡Hasta el próximo miércoles!" (until next Wednesday)
- In the movie Hellboy II: The Golden Army, the film's name is on the marquee of a theater in the shot of a city street, but as "SEE YOU NEXT _ _ _ N _ SDAY".
- The video for Michael Bublé's song "Hollywood" features a cinema showing See You Next Wednesday.
- In the documentary American Grindhouse to which Landis contributed, "See You Next Wednesday" is included in the end credit list of film clips used with the production company "miracle".
- In the Doctor Who 2013 episode "Nightmare in Silver", written by Neil Gaiman, the Doctor's companion Clara Oswald uses the phrase as a goodbye late in the episode.
- It is the sign off slogan each week for The Soapbox Office Podcast.
- In the sign off on Full Frontal with Samantha Bee on September 19, 2015
- An issue of Ghost Rider 2099 has it written on a wall in one of the frames.
- An 8.5 by 11 inch copy of the See You Next Wednesday billboard as seen in The Blues Brothers (1980) is seen on the fridge in the short comedy film Annulment.
- In Sharknado 5, a theater marquee displays "See You Next Wednesday", with showings at 1:30 and 6:00. The movie posters show a dancing couple, and the (apparent) stars of Price, Goodman, Kessler, and Hirsch (first names are not quite legible). These are the surnames of the four main characters in An American Werewolf in London.
- In Episode 61 of the Japanese version of Kirby: Right Back at Ya!, King Dedede is shown eating potato chips and watching a vampire movie, where the vampire in question (although never shown), says this line; it was replaced with "How kind of you to drop in for a bite" in the dub.
- In Episode 5 of Babylon 5's first season Catherine Sakai says to Commander Jeffrey Sinclair "See you next Wednesday" as she leaves the station near the end of the episode. (This was not an intentional reference, and the show runner later noted that he would have changed it if he had known about the Landis connection.)

== See also ==
- List of filmmakers' signatures
- I'll gladly pay you Tuesday for a hamburger today
- See You Next Tuesday
- Thursday Next
