= A113 =

Easter egg used in media

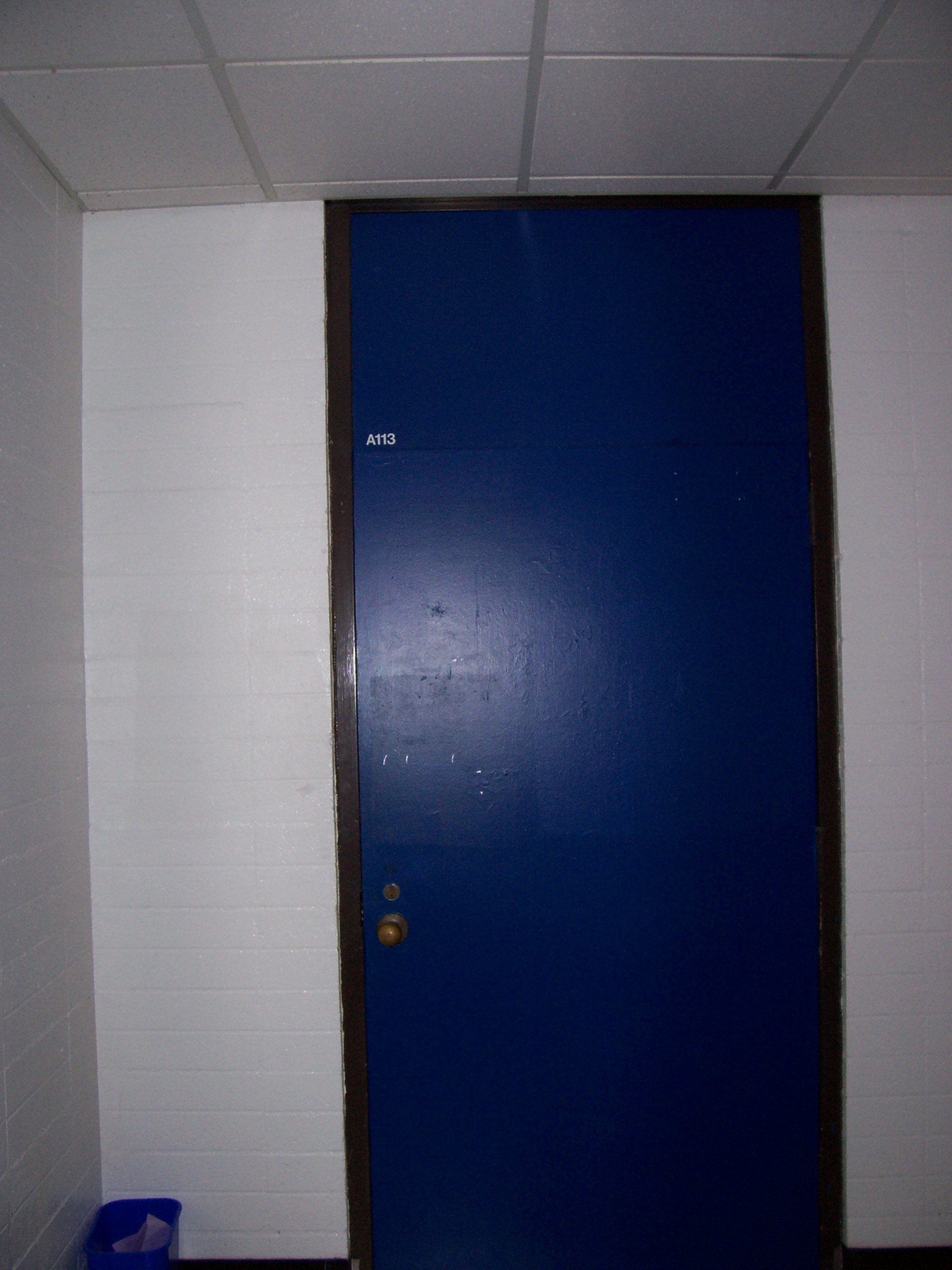
The door of Room A113 in 2005

A113 and its variants are an inside joke and Easter egg in media developed by alumni of California Institute of the Arts, referring to the classroom used by graphic design and character animation students.

== History ==
Students who have used the classroom include John Lasseter, Pete Docter, Chris Sanders, Tim Burton, Michael Peraza, and Brad Bird. It has appeared in several Disney films and almost every Pixar movie.

Brad Bird first used it for a license plate number in the "Family Dog" episode of Amazing Stories: "I put it into every single one of my films, including my Simpsons episodes—it's sort of my version of [caricaturist Al] Hirschfeld's 'Nina'." It also appears in South Park, Beavis and Butt-Head, Aqua Teen Hunger Force, Family Guy, American Dad!, Futurama, Robot Chicken, It's Always Sunny in Philadelphia, Doctor Who, Mission: Impossible – Ghost Protocol, Fallout 4, and Klaus (2019). The first movie Bird used it in was The Brave Little Toaster (1987), in which he worked on as an animator.

== See also ==
- List of Pixar film references
- List of filmmaker's signatures
- 42 – The Answer to the Ultimate Question of Life, the Universe, and Everything, first used by Douglas Adams in The Hitchhiker's Guide to the Galaxy, often used as an in-joke.
- Wilhelm scream
- Goroawase, a common Japanese language stylistic recourse in which numerical codes representing words are created with syllables that can be used to pronounce each numeral

== Bibliography ==
- Pixar (September 29, 2017). "Pixar Did You Know: A113 - Disney•Pixar". YouTube.
