= See You Next Tuesday =

See you next Tuesday is a common euphemistic backronym for the word "cunt" (C U next Tuesday) and can also refer to:

- See You Next Tuesday (band), an experimental deathcore band
- See You Next Tuesday (album), the second album by hip hop group FannyPack
- See You Next Tuesday (film), a 2013 independent film by Drew Tobia
- "See You Next Tuesday", a song by deathcore band The Acacia Strain that appears on their 2006 album The Dead Walk
- "C U Next Tuesday", a song by Kesha from the 2010 EP Cannibal
- "C U Next Tuesday", a song by Shakespears Sister from the 2019 compilation Singles Party
- "C U Next Tuesday", a weekly Twitch show hosted by Adam Pacitti
- "Seeya" (Deadmau5 song), a song by Deadmau5 from the 2014 album while(1<2), based on an earlier instrumental titled "Seeya Next Tuesday"

== See also ==
- See You Next Wednesday (disambiguation)
