= Lou Romano =

American animator and voice actor

- Occupations: Animator, voice actor
- Years active: 1992–present
- Employer(s): Pixar Animation Studios (2000–2009, 2021); Laika (2009–present)

Lou Romano is an American animator and voice actor. He did design work on Monsters, Inc. and The Incredibles, and provided the voices of Bernie Kropp in The Incredibles, Snot Rod in Cars, and Alfredo Linguini in Ratatouille.

Romano was interested in drawing and painting at an early age. He studied theater arts, performing in plays throughout junior high and high school. He studied acting at the San Diego School of Creative and Performing Arts (SCPA). After graduating in 1990, he studied animation at the California Institute of the Arts. He then completed workshops at The Groundlings in Los Angeles. He later went on to work as an art director and designer for animated projects, such as The Powerpuff Girls and The Iron Giant.

In 2000, Romano joined Pixar as the production designer of The Incredibles, for which he won an Annie Award in 2005. His artwork has been exhibited at the Museum of Modern Art and the Gallery at The Metropolitan Opera in New York City and has been published on the cover of The New Yorker. In 2009, Romano left Pixar to work at Laika in Portland, Oregon. He and his wife reside in the Bay Area.

== Filmography ==
- Whoopass Stew! (1992) – Voice of Amoeba Boys
- The Pagemaster (1994) – Effects assistant
- Dexter's Laboratory (1996) – Storyboard artist
- Cats Don't Dance (1997) – Effects assistant
- The Powerpuff Girls (1998-2000) – Background color designer, writer, storyboard artist
- The Iron Giant (1999) – Visual development
- Herd (1999) – Bible Boy #1
- The Trouble with Lou (2001) – Voice of Lou/Ciro Romano
- Monsters, Inc. (2001) – Visual development
- Monkeybone (2001) – Cop/Psychiatrist
- Boys Night Out (2003) – Voice
- The Incredibles (2004) – Production designer, voice of Bernie Kropp
- Jack-Jack Attack (2005) – Art director: lighting
- Cars (2006) – Voice of Snot Rod
- Ratatouille (2007) – Voice of Alfredo Linguini
- Your Friend the Rat (2007) – Voice of Alfredo Linguini
- Up (2009) – Art director: lighting
- Kinect Rush: A Disney-Pixar Adventure (2012) – Voice of Alfredo Linguini
- ParaNorman (2012) – Thanks
- Paperman (2012) – Visual development artist
- The Boxtrolls (2014) – Additional character designer
- The Little Prince (2016) – Production designer
- Kubo and the Two Strings (2016) – Concept artist
- Samurai Jack (2017) – Layout keys
- Dumbo (2019) – Concept artist
- The Lego Movie 2: The Second Part (2019) – Visual development artist
- Wonder Park (2019) – Art director
- Luca (2021) – Development artist
- Wendell & Wild (2022) – Production designer
- Ray Gunn (2026) - Special Thanks
