= Elastigirl =

Fictional character from The Incredibles

Helen Parr Elastigirl / Mrs. Incredible
- The Incredibles character
- Helen Parr / Elastigirl as seen in Incredibles 2
- First appearance: The Incredibles (2004)
- Created by: Brad Bird
- Voiced by: Holly Hunter (films, Disney Infinity series, Disney Speedstorm, Incredicoaster, commercials); E. G. Daily (video game, The Incredibles: When Danger Calls, Disney on Ice); Ally Johnson (Lego The Incredibles)

In-universe information
- Full name: Helen Parr (née Truax)
- Aliases: Elastigirl; Mrs. Incredible
- Occupation: Superhero; housewife
- Spouse: Bob Parr
- Children: Violet Parr (daughter); Dash Parr (older son); Jack-Jack Parr (younger son)
- Abilities: Superhuman elasticity; Shapeshifting

Helen Parr (née Truax), also known as Elastigirl or Mrs. Incredible, is a fictional character in Pixar's The Incredibles franchise. A superhero with superhuman elasticity, she is able to stretch and contort her body to extreme lengths and shapes. The wife of Bob Parr (Mr. Incredible) and mother of their three children, she first appears in the animated film The Incredibles (2004), where she and her family defy government-mandated retirement to battle the supervillain Syndrome. In its sequel, Incredibles 2 (2018), she is recruited to lead a public relations campaign in relegalizing superheroes, while a new villain attempts to tarnish their reputation permanently.

The character was created by The Incredibles' screenwriter and director, Brad Bird, who gave her elasticity to symbolize the multitasking demands placed on mothers. Animators used a layered rig system and custom deformation tools to animate her stretching abilities, establishing her as the most complex rig Pixar had used up to that point. For the sequel, which shifts focus to Helen, technological advancements made in the 14 years since the original film granted more complex animation of her stretching, hair, and clothing, while the writers also made a concerted effort to humanize her character. She is voiced by actress Holly Hunter.

Helen received a positive response from film critics, who praised her characterization, the animation of her superpowers, and Hunter's performance. Her depiction prompted discussions about feminism and gender roles, with some critics praising her confidence, while others argued that she reinforces traditional domestic expectations and offers mixed messages about working mothers. Helen has been recognized by multiple publications as one of Pixar's greatest characters and one of fiction's most notable on-screen mothers, while critics have discussed her role in relation to the scarcity of lead female superheroes in superhero films.

Following the release of the sequel, Helen's exaggerated physique became a topic of widespread media discussion. Some commentators viewed her curvy appearance as a positive representation of women's bodies in animation, while others expressed concern that the character was being sexualized in a film primarily aimed at children. The character's likeness has been used in various tie-in media and merchandise.

== Role ==
Helen Truax first appears in The Incredibles (2004) as Elastigirl, a superhero with superhuman elasticity. Following the government's ban on superheroes due to a series of accidents and lawsuits, she marries fellow superhero Bob Parr (Mr. Incredible) and retires. The couple has three children, Violet, Dash, and Jack-Jack, and insists that they conceal their own superpowers to remain undetected among civilians. While Bob struggles with the loss of his superheroic identity, Helen adapts to domesticity as a housewife easier than her family, but grows concerned by Bob's aloofness as he secretly resumes hero work. Suspicious of his behavior, Helen consults costume designer Edna Mode, who reveals Bob's actions and location, restores her confidence, and outfits her with a new super suit. She tracks Bob to Nomanisan Island, where she infiltrates the base of Syndrome (Buddy Pine), a crazed inventor and former superfan of Mr. Incredible's, who has turned against him for dismissing him as a child. Violet and Dash stowaway aboard her chartered jet, and they narrowly survive an attack from Syndrome's missiles. After reuniting with Bob on the island, the family is captured but manages to escape and return to Municiberg, where they defeat Syndrome's final Omnidroid. Back home, Syndrome attempts to abduct Jack-Jack, but the baby unexpectedly manifests powers and escapes. Helen catches Jack-Jack midair by transforming into a parachute, while Syndrome is ultimately killed when his own cape is caught in his aircraft. The film ends three months later, with the family preparing to confront a new threat, the Underminer.

In Incredibles 2 (2018), Helen is recruited by telecommunications moguls, siblings Winston and Evelyn Deavor, to lead a public relations campaign aimed at restoring public support for superheroes, who remain outlawed after the Parrs fail to apprehend the Underminer. Selected over Bob due to her lower history of collateral damage, Helen becomes the public face of the movement and undertakes solo missions designed to demonstrate the value of superheroes, while Bob remains home with their children. During one of Helen's missions, she encounters a mysterious villain called the Screenslaver, who uses hypnotic signals transmitted through television screens and goggles to control others. Helen eventually discovers that Evelyn is the Screenslaver, motivated by a belief that society's reliance on superheroes contributed to her parents' deaths. Evelyn hypnotizes Helen and Bob, and attempts to sabotage the campaign by forcing them to crash a luxury ship carrying several dignitaries into the city. Helen is ultimately freed when Jack-Jack uses his powers to remove her goggles, allowing her to free Bob and Frozone, and intercept Evelyn. With her family's help, Helen apprehends Evelyn during her attempted escape and, after stopping her from throwing herself to her death, hands her over to the police.

== Development ==
=== Creation ===
Screenwriter and director Brad Bird had pitched The Incredibles to Pixar as a scenario where a superhero family is forced to live as civilians in a witness relocation program. While the father is stuck reliving his past, Helen embraces their new life to the point that she has, according to Bird, set aside a part of her personality she believes she no longer needs, only to discover that she does miss it to some degree. Bird said that, by the end of The Incredibles, Helen "has no intention of slowing down ever, and is rediscovering and reawakening [the superhero] side of her". He created Helen as a tribute to "the typical modern-day mom", and cited his own wife, Elizabeth, as inspiration for the character. Wanting the family's powers to symbolize typical nuclear family roles, he gave Helen elasticity to represent mothers who are constantly balancing countless responsibilities and being pulled in multiple directions.

Originally, the script included a scene where Helen defends her decision to be a stay-at-home mother from a businesswoman who openly mocks the term. It was inspired by interactions Bird's wife had with her peers when she had first decided to be a homemaker and found that several people reacted dismissively. The scene was storyboarded but cut when the writers decided to open the film by introducing Helen and Bob as younger superheroes instead of a normal couple. One of the earliest ideas Bird had conceived for the film was when Helen notices her reflection after breaking into a supervillain's lair, and wearily acknowledges the weight she had gained since last donning a supersuit. Bird said this demonstrates some of the mundane, relatable feelings the titular family struggles with despite their extraordinary talents. Although there were some concerns that this moment would unintentionally undermine or sexualize the character, most of the crew understood Bird's intentions to make her more interesting, flawed, and relatable, and the scene was retained. Pixar had asked Bird to rewrite an argument between Helen and Bob because they feared it looked like she was being bullied by her husband. Instead of changing any dialogue, the director had Helen stretch to meet Bob's height to visually establish that "she's not intimidated by him, she's just as tough as he is".

In earlier drafts of the film, Bird had intended for Helen's friend, pilot Snug Porter, to fly her to Nomanisan Island himself, only to be killed when the plane is attacked and crashes into the ocean to emphasize the ruthlessness of the villains. Executive producer John Lasseter suggested that Helen fly the plane herself, which Bird protested, knowing he could not kill off Helen. Animators had also voiced concerns that it would be too time-consuming to design and cast a major character, only for them to die so early in the film. Eventually, Snug became too reliant on exposition at the expense of central characters and was ultimately reduced to a telephone conversation. Another discarded character, Xerek, had originally been envisioned as an ex-boyfriend of Helen's and the film's antagonist. He was written out and replaced by Syndrome, shifting the villain connection from Helen's past to Bob's and eliminating the ex-boyfriend subplot. Since the film's head of story was a military enthusiast, Bird made sure Helen's aviation terminology was authentic. Helen's call sign for her jet, India Golf Niner-Niner (IG99), is a reference to the animated film The Iron Giant (1999), which Bird also wrote and directed.

Because the character shares her name and some abilities with the DC Comics superheroine Elasti-Girl, Pixar made an arrangement with DC's parent company, Warner Bros., to use the name "Elastigirl" in The Incredibles, but refer to her as "Mrs. Incredible" outside of the film. According to comic book historian Peter Sanderson, DC had possibly neglected to renew the name's trademark, unintentionally allowing Disney to use it in the film.

=== Characterization and animation ===
Bird based much of Helen's personality on both his wife and his mother. He described Helen as more emotionally developed than Bob, having transitioned from superhero to civilian easier. According to the director, she, unlike Bob, considers herself to be a parent and wife first and foremost, over a crime-fighter. According to Helen's voice actress, Holly Hunter, the character possesses "total fearlessness" as a superhero, but also "a very strong, protective instinct" that extends to both her children and civilians. As the first Pixar film with an all-human cast, The Incredibles posed several unprecedented computer animation challenges. Bird prioritized the human characters feeling real over looking real, and insisted that Helen's stretching use "real physics", despite being "physically impossible". Deciding each character should move differently from each other, Bird said Helen's "buttery movements ... suggest that she could fit into any situation". Each member of the Parr family is based on a geometric shape, with Helen resembling a heart. Animator Lou Romano found it challenging to design her in a believable manner that showed her as both maternal and heroic. Incredibles 2 producer Nicole Paradis Grindle, who had worked as a simulation manager on the first film, specifically requested that Helen's second supersuit include tights to better represent women favoring less revealing clothing as they age, and referenced her own body to inform the character's design.

Her character model was built in Maya, rigged and animated using Pixar's proprietary tools, and rendered in RenderMan. To show the turmoil she endures when using her powers, the director decided a simple morph would not suffice. Helen's musculature was particularly difficult to master, since the character must stretch, bend, and fold herself into various shapes. Animators developed a program called a deformer, which allowed them to twist and turn the character as required, and mold her body and limbs into different shapes. Character supervisor Bill Wise believes Helen was likely the most sophisticated articulation rig Pixar had created to that point. Character articulation artist Mark Therrell explained that one of the most significant challenges Helen posed was creating an "attractive woman" that could be articulated in a traditional way, using natural human joints and proportions. He added that the team also needed to transition this rig into a "monster-like" form that still appeared elegant, slender, and feminine while performing actions that were humanly impossible. To achieve this, Therrell created two different rigs: the first was a standard rig, traditionally articulated using Pixar's proprietary animation software; the second was a "snake" rig that used the curve deformer on a duplicate of her geometry. By layering the snake rig on top of the standard rig, they were able to control a nearly identical version of Helen's body that remains hidden from audiences. Animators would animate Helen like any other human character, switching to a different rig when they needed her to stretch, and using control points along the curve to achieve various effects, such as constraining objects and wrapping her arms around telephone poles. To return to animating the original Helen, animators reduced her control point values back to zero.

To create the effect of Helen transforming into a parachute, the team adapted the curve deformer to use flat, surface-based geometry. They developed a flattened gingerbread man-like version of her body that moved in sync with her standard skeleton, which allowed them to venture beyond simple linear stretches and transitions into broader, more malleable shapes. In certain scenes, her costumes were animated using completely different software, such as when Edna is showing her newly designed supersuit for the first time, where it was a 2.5D matte painting created with Autodesk 3ds Max and rendered with SplutterFish's Brazil rendering system. Animator Dave Mullins worked on the scene where Helen nearly drops her telephone during her conversation with Edna for six weeks, and referenced video footage of himself performing the same actions to understand their dynamics. Similarly, animator Karen Kiser filmed herself and her children jumping off a dock to animate the scene where Helen and her children freefall from their downed jet. In 2004, media outlets reported that Mister Fantastic's role in the final act of the then-upcoming Fantastic Four (2005) film was expanded once filmmakers saw what The Incredibles had been able to achieve using Elastigirl's special effects.

=== Voice ===
Helen is voiced by American actress Holly Hunter. Bird cast Hunter because he found her voice possesses a combination of vulnerability and strength indicative of the character he had envisioned, who he described as just as resilient as she is flexible. Hunter had never voiced an animated character before, and welcomed the opportunity to expand her repertoire. She was also drawn to the film's "unconventional story about family and human dynamics".

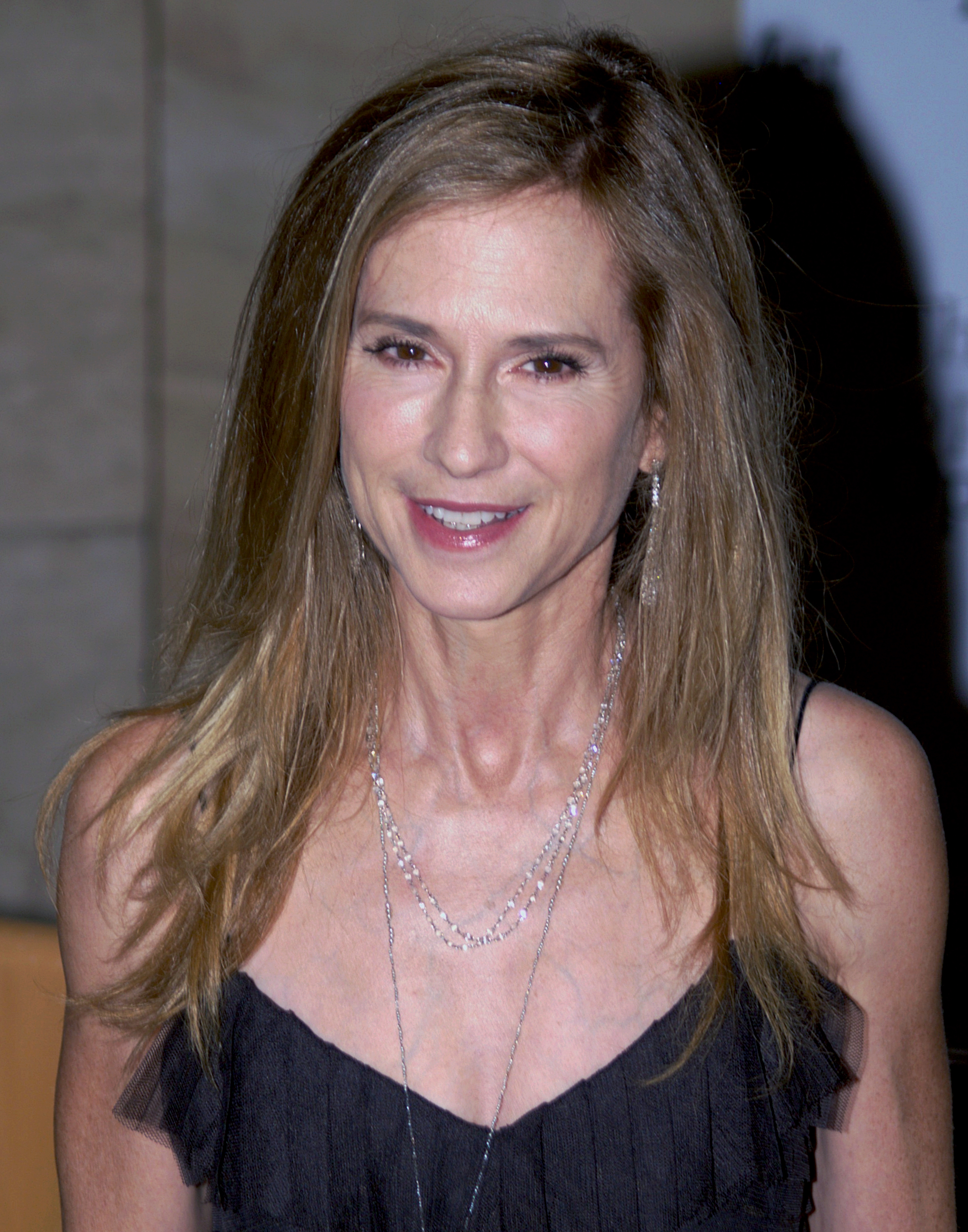
Actress Holly Hunter voices Helen in both Incredibles films.

Hunter did not read from a script or storyboards for much of her time working on The Incredibles. Instead, she relied on Bird's direction and knowledge of her character. Although a complete script had been written and available, she explained that avoiding it was inherent to the non-chronological manner in which animated projects are often completed. Bird would describe scenes and read as other characters from within her recording booth. She welcomed Bird's hands-on approach to directing, an intimacy she believes has been lost in live-action since monitors allow directors to maintain distance from their actors on set. The actress reportedly lost her voice during several recording sessions despite Bird's efforts to limit yelling and screaming, often requiring vocal rest. Hunter made sure to educate herself on the military terminology used during the plane crash scene, much of which she only recorded once. In addition to having played an air traffic controller in Always (1989), she read flight manuals and met with fighter pilots. Animators filmed Hunter's recording sessions to use as live-action reference. Although she worked closely with Bird, she remained surprised by the results of the final film due to her unfamiliarity with the animation process, which she was better prepared for by the sequel. She worked on The Incredibles for approximately two-and-a-half years.

Hunter opted to not ask Bird about a sequel, preferring any potential follow-ups to be conceived organically. She had first learned about the project when Bird's Tomorrowland (2015) was being released, and confirmed she would start recording for the sequel within a month of March 2016. Hunter described working on the sequel as more fun than the first film, as she was more familiar and comfortable with Bird's filmmaking process and Helen's character development, despite knowing little about the story itself. She attributed the cast and crew's willingness to return to Bird's genuine interest in crafting an authentic storyline for Helen. Bird revealed few details, initially only telling Hunter that Helen would be returning to work while Bob remains home with the children. However, she did not realize how much more substantial her role was until six months into recording Incredibles 2. In total, she recorded on-and-off for approximately one-and-a-half years. For the sequel, she only read scenes her character appears in, thus roughly half of the film remained a secret to her until she watched the completed version. Because the actors only recorded opposite Bird instead of each other, Hunter did not meet co-star Craig T. Nelson, voice of Bob, until approximately a year before Incredibles 2 was released.

Hunter had become a mother herself in-between The Incredibles and Incredibles 2. Having played mothers since the beginning of her career, she maintains that the role had never felt foreign due to her active imagination. She found it refreshing to see Elastigirl explore a persona beyond motherhood and domesticity, and noted that the character subverts the types of roles actresses her age are typically offered, particularly in live-action. Helen remained Hunter's only voice acting credit until her 2019 guest role on Bless the Harts.

=== Incredibles 2 ===
Helen became the protagonist of Incredibles 2. According to Bird, the core idea of Helen and Bob reversing roles had existed since 2004. Grindle confirmed that Bird had conceived Helen receiving her own mission 14 years before the sequel, which focuses on reminding her she "was really good at being a Super" before housework. Bird said that while the ending of the first film suggests the family's issues had largely been resolved, he knew there was still a part of Helen that missed being a superhero. Despite its apparent simplicity, Bird rewrote the scene where Helen and Bob discuss her working for DevTech several times to make sure Bob expresses some unhappiness without seeming overly childish or resentful. He also used the scene to establish that Helen's hesitancy is not about lacking confidence in herself, but rather prioritizing being a superhero to a lesser degree than her husband. Frequent Pixar director Andrew Stanton helped Bird recognize that the sequel's stakes would need to be significantly heightened to credibly motivate Helen—a devoted mother and law-abiding hero—to leave her family and violate laws she once staunchly defended, without compromising her character. The director acknowledged that Helen could easily be perceived as perfect or idealized, and set a personal goal to further humanize her in the sequel.

Bird insisted that Helen's expanded role was not inspired by #MeToo or Time's Up, but rather a decision that developed organically from the writers. Ultimately, they strove to revive the bold, action-oriented version of Helen introduced in the first film—the part of herself she had suppressed to care for her family. The sequel explores how she channels that same ambition when returning to the field as a mature woman, calling back to her interview in The Incredibles where she asserts that she is not interested in settling down. Although he appreciated audiences finding real-world parallels, Bird argued that Helen's action heroine self-rediscovery was equally integral in The Incredibles, and she remains the same strong female character. Similarly, Hunter said the sequel is about character revelation and its release during the movement was coincidental rather than intentional. Hunter explained that unlike the first film in which Helen resumes heroism out of necessity, she confronts "her own ambition head-on". The actress appreciated seeing a "full-fledged" version of her character boast traits she believes women are often taught to suppress, without compromising her femininity, and described the sequel's iteration of Helen as embodying both maturity and youthful energy. Furthermore, Hunter said the new dynamic mirrors real families where "a woman may be the sole breadwinner". She believes that showing a woman leading and solving problems could only have a positive impact on audiences, and interpreted Incredibles 2 as a metaphor for working mothers.

Helen's costumes were designed by Bryn Imagire. In Incredibles 2, she wears three different supersuits, in addition to her "everyday wardrobe". Her gymnast-like bodysuit was intentionally designed to be appropriate for the film's target audience. The supersuits in particular benefited from technological advancements that allowed for stretching and shrinking to accommodate her athleticism. Designers began by building one basic suit, then adjusting its shading and logos to create three distinct looks. For her newest supersuit, they drew inspiration from vintage wetsuits, and used darker colors to help her appear more inconspicuous at night, in contrast to her original red and white outfit. In-universe, the suit was created by Edna's competitor, Alexander Galbacki. His design was intentionally off-putting, serving as a commentary on how supersuits in modern superhero films have become less vibrant and colorful. The chosen palette, red and black, are also colors Bird enjoys himself. Character artists and costume designers based Helen's civilian wardrobe on 1950s and 1960s trends, particularly silhouettes worn by actresses Mary Tyler Moore, Marilyn Monroe, and Audrey Hepburn. While Helen's body shape was exaggerated to emulate the comic book style of superheroines, features such as her waist size were adjusted so she would look more natural wearing civilian clothes.

The team rewrote Helen's runaway train chase to be interrupted by a phone call from Dash searching for his sneakers to reemphasize Helen's family. Her largest solo action scene to that point, they extended the sequence to include more stunts for Helen, allowing her to keep up with the train without needing to slow it down prematurely. Meanwhile, the city itself was adjusted to accommodate Helen's navigation, including increasing the distance between buildings so she would appear less "haphazard" leaping between them. The "Elasticycle" was designed as an extension of her powers, matching her flexibility and agility. Animator Kureha Yokoo, a former motorcyclist, was consulted about the vehicle's design, movement, and riding. However, they avoided researching other motorcycle films to maintain originality, instead sourcing inspiration from various sports including motocross, water skiing, skateboarding, and Parkour, which they combined with Elastigirl's abilities. Simulation supervisor Tiffany Erickson Klohn described retaining Helen's hairstyle while she rode atop a train traveling at 200 miles per hour (320 km/h) as a significant challenge, which required new hair simulation software. Story supervisor Ted Mathot said that, at times, they struggled to humanize Elastigirl because "she's pretty close to perfect" in the first film, and worked to expose some of her flaws by having her struggle and make mistakes throughout the sequence. Bird explained that Helen's efficiency at fighting crime makes her less dynamic in certain contexts, such as when she has to exaggerate her actions for the Deavors' cameras. Director of photography Mahyar Abousaeedi used the camera to convey that Helen is a strategist and always "a couple steps ahead of the game", using her environment to her advantage, in contrast to Bob's approach.

Concept art for the character was designed by Bob Pauly and Tony Fucile. By Incredibles 2, the Incredibles' original animation system had grown obsolete, requiring the animators to rebuild returning characters such as Helen using new rigging tools. Mullins returned to supervise her animation and make sure animators understood the limits of her stretching. In addition to supplying them with rubber bands for reference, Mullins explained that, like rubber bands, Helen weakens the further she stretches. Furthermore, he clarified that the character only stretches when necessary, resisting the temptation to animate her stretching unnecessarily, while her head and face remain unchanged regardless of how far she stretches. Her expanded role provided animators with new rigging opportunities, allowing them to stretch Helen in ways not possible in the first film. Updated technology enabled greater secondary motion and articulation for a "softer" feel, particularly in her buttocks and thighs. The tentacle rigs used for Hank in Finding Dory (2016) served as inspiration for enabling Helen to stretch beyond her capabilities in the first film, and this approach was applied to her new rig.

== Powers and abilities ==
As Elastigirl, Helen's primary superpower is superhuman elasticity, which allows her to stretch and reshape her body into various sizes, lengths, and forms, while manipulating her own density and durability. She can mold her arms into arcs, curves, zigzags, and loop-the-loops. These abilities also extend to shapeshifting, which she uses to change her form into various shapes including speedboats, parachutes, and slingshots.

The reported extent of her abilities has varied across sources, with some such as the National Supers Agency (NSA) in The Incredibles stating she can stretch up to 100 feet (30 m) in length and compress herself to 1 millimeter thin. However, Syndrome's Operation Kronos database states she can stretch up to 300 feet (91 m). She has demonstrated some feats mimicking invulnerability and strength, such as leaping 80 feet (24 m), subduing physically stronger adversaries, and carrying heavy objects such as an RV. According to a paper published in the University of Leicester Open Journals, researchers examined the feasibility of Elastigirl stopping the runaway train in Incredibles 2 by stretching into the form of a parachute. They estimated that she would have needed to stretch to a diameter of approximately 20 ft (6.16 m) at a train speed of 150 mph, or 13 ft (3.90 m) at the maximum maglev speed of 375 mph. However, she is still susceptible to pain and discomfort, and Edna confirms she can injure herself if she stretches beyond her limit. The further she stretches, the less physically strong she becomes. One of her known weaknesses is exposure to sub-freezing temperatures. In Incredibles 2, Evelyn imprisons her in a refrigerated room, warning her that attempting to stretch in such conditions could cause her to "break". Bob Odenkirk, who voices Winston in Incredibles 2, described her as arguably "the most powerful character in the movie". Her powers are also shown to have practical applications "to meet the daily challenges of modern motherhood".

Her powers are similar to those of Mister Fantastic (Reed Richards) from the Fantastic Four, Elasti-Girl (Rita Farr) from Doom Patrol, and the DC superhero Plastic Man (Patrick "Eel" O'Brian). Comic book historian Peter Sanderson said Helen's powers "lend themselves to more active, aggressive uses, and hence are more appropriate for a contemporary superheroine" than those of her daughter, Violet, who can turn herself invisible and generate force fields. He noted that while she shares Mister Fantastic's powers, her emotional maturity is more similar to that of his wife, the Invisible Woman (Sue Storm), which possibly alludes to Helen telling Bob at the beginning of the first film that he should try being more flexible. In addition to her powers, Elastigirl is shown to be a skilled pilot and tactician, as well as an expert hand-to-hand combatant and motorcyclist. Writers Christos Gage and Landry Q. Walker described her as having been one of the world's best superheroes in her prime.

Hunter believes that the way Helen and Bob compete with each other using their superpowers reflects a quality they share in their relationship. Hunter said her character approaches superheroism and problem-solving "very differently from Mr. Incredible", including typically causing less collateral damage, and in maintaining an objectivity in contrast to Bob's hot-headedness. Hunter believes the lack of collateral damage supports the idea that Helen uses a mathematical approach when solving problems as a superhero. S. E. Fleenor of Syfy Wire observed that her flexibility extends beyond her superpowers to adaptability, demonstrating a willingness to change her mind when needed and a meticulousness in her decision-making. However, Reactor's Leah Schnelbach observed that "It's a fun irony that someone whose power is stretching is absolutely inflexible when it comes to her moral core". Mila Gauvin of The Harvard Crimson believes her fights in the sequel confirm "Elastigirl's physicality and ingenuity all at once, something Mr. Incredible never masters".

== Reception ==
Helen has been mostly well-received by reviewers of The Incredibles. Anthony Lane of The New Yorker called her its best character. Colin Low of Slant Magazine found the character to have the film's most interesting arc. In a review for The Spokesman-Review, Cheryl-Anne Millsap applauded Helen for gracefully balancing her roles as mother and superhero, embodying resilience and adaptability in ways that resonate with real women. Peter Bradshaw of The Guardian and Michael Boyle of /Film highlighted the downing of her jet as an engaging action sequence. Todd McCarthy of Variety and Jennifer Frey of The Washington Post were among critics who praised the animation, versatility, and in-universe applications of Helen's superpowers. Dana Stevens of Slate said she never tires of rewatching "Elastigirl stretching to her full length", and Devin Faraci of CHUD.com anticipated her elasticity being far superior to Mister Fantastic's in Fantastic Four. Helen's introductory interview, in which she expresses little interest in settling down and asserts her confidence as a female superhero, prompted commentary on her views regarding gender roles. Stuart Klawans of The Nation said Helen's willingness to trade her career for a house and children reinforces traditional gender stereotypes, despite uttering "one or two semi-feminist wisecracks". Meanwhile, Carla Meyer of the San Francisco Chronicle felt the film risks alienating female audiences by depicting Helen as a content homemaker instead of yearning for a superheroic career. She concluded that the character's eventual rediscovery of her confidence and ambition comes "almost, but not quite, too late". Collider reported that some critics found the character lacking a substantial role until the film's third act. At the 31st People's Choice Awards, Elastigirl was nominated for Favourite Animated Movie Star.

Film critics generally praised the decision to make Helen the central character of Incredibles 2. S. E. Fleenor of Syfy Wire credited the sequel with finally highlighting "the real hero of both films". The Boston Herald said she "remains animation's most dazzling super-mother". The character's action sequences were praised, particularly how her powers are showcased. Reactor's Leah Schnelbach found that, by giving Helen "most of those truly great action set pieces", the sequel improved on one of her few complaints about the first film. William Hughes of The A.V. Club lauded Helen's proficiency during the runaway train scene. Sam Machkovech of Ars Technica described her as "an absolute marvel of abilities, movement, and silliness", and declared the same scene one of the 20 best action film sequences. However, McCarthy complained that Helen's frequent confrontations with runaway vehicles risk becoming repetitive. In 2018, Helen was nominated for the Visual Effects Society Award for Outstanding Animated Character in an Animated Feature. Steven McIntosh of BBC Online reported that Helen's subversion of gender roles captivated both critics and audiences, with Mila Gauvin of The Harvard Crimson writing that the film "highlights women's strength to not only be great parents, but to also be just as competent, if not more so, than men in the workfield". Writers such as Ciara Wardlow of The Hollywood Reporter and Alexander Evangelista of Rappler noted that Helen's role reversal invited conversations about the patriarchy, feminism, and women's roles in society. In Gender in 21st Century Animated Children's Cinema, Manu Díaz Inglés argues that placing Helen at the center of the film's narrative inevitably engages several gender issues. Moya Crockett of Stylist appreciated the film for highlighting Helen as a strong and empowered yet flawed lead, whereas Maria Sherman of Jezebel said it empowered her without defaulting to superficiality. Anna Smith of The Guardian expressed excitement for "animation that bucked tired gender cliches even more than the first film had", but found the sequel lacking in compelling women compared to men. Writing for Bustle, Rachel Simon said although the film appears relevant to "the current push for more female superheroes and gender equality on-screen", she cautioned audiences that Incredibles 2 is not necessarily "meant to be an ode to female empowerment". The Cord reported that, in the months leading up to the film's release, several commentators vehemently condemned what they viewed as the film's "feminist agenda".

Several critics found aspects of the sequel's gender politics to be outdated, and offered mixed reviews of the film's perceived feminist themes. Slate's Inkoo Kang enjoyed only two scenes from Helen, feeling the sequel otherwise overemphasized "Elastigirl's guilt about being apart from her children". Cultural critic Glen Weldon argued that while the first film already establishes Helen as a superior hero to Bob unconstrained by gender norms, the sequel regresses by limiting her agency to action scenes. Writing for Epigram, Danny Shaw said any of the sequel's progress about feminism, gender roles, and relationships is undone when Helen is rescued by her family. Critics such as Andrea Thompson of the Chicago Reader, Patricia Puentes of CNET, and Eric Seitz of The Vindicator each argued that Helen's arc in Incredibles 2 regresses from the empowerment she demonstrated in the original film by reducing her role to a gender-swapped retread of her husband's journey and reinforcing traditional domestic norms. According to Rutgers University student researcher Khushi Patel, although Incredibles 2 was praised for its portrayal of equal gender roles and feminism, Helen's progression from supermom to superhero and back to supermom ultimately reinforces traditional gender norms and reflects conventional depictions of women in films and other media. The Florida Times-Union's Al Alexander said Helen's feminism already felt dated compared to the previous year's Wonder Woman (2017), and Justin Chang of the Los Angeles Times found her role as a female action hero more impactful within the context of the film's period setting than 2018. However, Ed Symkus of The Register-Guard defended Bird from accusations of attempting to capitalize on the trend of feminist-themed films in Hollywood, arguing that he had already been working on Incredibles 2 years before films such as Wonder Woman were released. The Guardian's Hanna Flint commended Disney for "giving its female characters more agency", noting that making Helen the breadwinner was "a progressive reflection of our modern world", but she felt this came at the cost of a poor depiction of Bob as a stay-at-home father. Both Kang and Charles Pulliam-Moore of Gizmodo agreed that Bob was undeserving of Helen's loyalty due to his behavior in the sequel, and Romper's Samantha Darby argued that Bob's actions only reinforce the perception that Helen is the Parrs' primary caregiver. Suzy Sammons of Dove.org rejected readings that focused on male domestic incompetence or framed the film as a simple feminist message, arguing that the film instead depicts Helen Parr as a capable working mother who balances her professional calling with a constant awareness of her family's needs. She praised the character as a positive portrayal of a strong partnership and a mother who prioritizes her family even while returning to work.

Hunter's performance in both films was well-received. Bradshaw deemed it "a genuine career highlight", and Scott Chitwood of ComingSoon.net praised her effortlessness in transitioning "from heroine to mom". Frey said Helen is enriched by Hunter's "earthy voice", while Jeff Vice of the Deseret News said she delivers the cast's standout performance. James Berardinelli argued that while her voice may be "a little too recognizable ... it doesn't take long for us to forget the actress as the character comes to life". On her work in the sequel, Peter Travers of Rolling Stone said Hunter "makes the newly emboldened character resonate onscreen like nobody's business", and Chang said she delivers a "powerhouse portrait of motherhood at its most resilient". IndieWire ranked her Pixar's third-best performance, behind Amy Poehler in Inside Out (2015). Writing for the same publication, Chris O’Falt named Hunter one of "The 20 Best Voice Performances of the Last 20 Years", in 2016. Entertainment Weekly ranked her sixth, and GameRant ranked her seventh. In the Vulture article "The 25 Best Animated Movie Voice Performances Since Aladdin", journalist Bilge Ebiri ranked her 21st and compared it to her work in Raising Arizona (1987). Backstage included Hunter's work in both films among "14 of the Best Voice Acting Performances of All Time". GoldDerby ranked it the third-best performance of her career, and Collider ranked it seventh, describing it as integral to both the film and "the creation of an icon". Variety ranked Hunter the 36th greatest acting performance from a superhero film, and gave her an honorable mention in recognition of the "13 Best Disney Voice Performances".

== Impact ==
=== Legacy and commendations ===
Helen has been consistently acknowledged in media retrospectives and rankings as one of Pixar's standout characters. Rolling Stone ranked Helen Pixar's 14th best Pixar character and second highest-ranking Incredibles character, behind Edna (ninth). In 2017, Vanessa Bogart of /Film named Helen her favorite Pixar character. Writing for the same publication, Josh Spiegel called her one of Pixar's most complex characters and ranked her seventh. She has been described by several publications as one of fiction's greatest on-screen mothers, including Time, the Los Vegas Review-Journal, Catholic Digest, Today's Parent, the Cape Cod Times, and The Birmingham News. In a 2013 user poll by LoveFilm, the character was voted the "top screen mum". Additional publications—including The Liberty Champion, Collider, The Daily Register, the Minnesota Star Tribune, and USA Today—have featured her among the best mothers in animation and film history. Within the context of animated films, Progga Paromita of Bdnews24.com recognized Helen as an example of an independent mother who maintains a compelling arc of her own, despite her supporting role in the first film. Deeming her the true hero of The Incredibles, writer and cartoonist Sarah Boxer said she not only subverts the trend of deceased or absent mothers in animated films, but suggests "a view of what animated movies could be—not another desperate attempt to assert the inalienable rights of men, but an incredible world where everyone has rights and powers, even the mothers". She has also been described as a positive female role model by outlets such as the San Francisco Chronicle and CNET. Tamina Summersgill of Palatinate said that, by positioning women in the workplace as beneficial to all parties, The Incredibles established "the working mother, [as] a role-model for viewers no matter their gender or generation". In an interview with The New York Times columnist Maureen Dowd, some members of the CIA's Band of Sisters named Helen their favorite female crime-fighter, and described themselves as "a work force of Elastigirls".

Helen's role in Incredibles 2 was widely regarded as culturally relevant, aligning with ongoing conversations about female representation, empowerment, and gender parity. Incredibles 2's release coincided with an increase in central female superheroes and action heroes in media. Chris Hayner of GameSpot wrote that the Incredibles franchise elevated this trend by "putting its female hero front-and-center, over her male counterpart ... send[ing] a powerful message to young viewers who still aren't used to seeing a female hero taking charge and leading the way". Several critics noted that Helen contributed to addressing Pixar's then-criticized lack of female representation. Writer and cartoonist Michael Cavna compared Pixar's promotional strategy for Incredibles 2 to the DC Extended Universe's emphasis on Wonder Woman as its "strongest recent move", noting that this perspective is also reflected by characters within the sequel. In 2018, Marc Snetiker of Entertainment Weekly said the character was underappreciated "for being a game-changing movie superhero back in 2004". Meyer called her the greatest female superhero film character until Wonder Woman (2017), and the genre's best-written superheroine since Catwoman in Batman Returns (1992). Both Meyer and Kaitlyn A. Cummings in Panic at the Discourse recognized Elastigirl for succeeding where female-fronted superhero films such as Catwoman (2004) and Elektra (2005) had failed. Having earned over $1 billion worldwide, Incredibles 2 was one of the highest-grossing films of 2018 and, according to Yahoo Finance, is one of the 20 highest-grossing female-lead films of all-time. Journalists have highlighted Helen's distinct role as a mother at the center of her film's narrative, particularly within the traditionally male-dominated action genre. Publications such as IGN, Yahoo! Life, Collider, and PhilstarLife.com have ranked her among the greatest superhero movie moms. Jack Shepherd of The Independent noted that, despite the ubiquity of superhero media by 2018, Helen remained "incredibly unique" as arguably the only mother to star in one of the genre's films, as well as one of the few leading superheroines "in recent cinematic history". Meanwhile, The Michigan Daily declared her "the most iconic superhero mom of all time" in 2021. However, scholar Michael Macaluso argued that critics' celebration of Helen's role in the sequel overlooks her equally significant role in the first film. Macaluso suggested that such responses risk simplifying feminist representation by treating Helen's strength as a new development rather than a continuation of her established character.

Media outlets have often highlighted Helen's significance as an action-oriented female character in film and animation, with Fandango naming her the bravest, strongest woman in Pixar history. Collider ranked her Pixar's second strongest female character. Writing for the same publication, Daniela Gama declared Helen "one of the earliest and most memorable female action heroes in animated movies", and ranked her the 25th "Best Action Movie Heroine of All Time". Rolling Stone ranked Elastigirl the eighth greatest movie superhero, and GameSpot ranked her the 30th most important superhero across all mediums. The Guardian recognized her as one of the 10 greatest action heroines, and Rotten Tomatoes ranked her the 26th most fearless and inspiring film heroine.

=== Body image and sexualization ===
Incredibles 2's release generated media discussion surrounding the portrayal and evolution of Helen's physique compared to the first film. Many fans expressed admiration for Helen's curvier body shape on social media, often describing it using the slang term "thicc". Internet searches for "Elastigirl thicc" and "Elastigirl dumb thicc" dramatically increased after the film's release, and scenes featuring the character's buttocks inspired various memes, GIFs, and YouTube videos. Attempting to rationalize the public's infatuation with her body, Jodi Walker of The Ringer and stop motion animator Bona Bones theorized that Helen's physique was designed not primarily to be sexually appealing, but rather to convey her role as a maternal figure through the use of common visual tropes. Walker attributed the public's increased fascination with Helen's figure to its alignment with contemporary beauty standards—particularly the emphasis on wide hips and small waists—which had become more desirable by the time of the sequel's release, in contrast to the limited attention the character received in 2004. Writers for The Michigan Daily observed that the emphasis on Helen's figure reflected evolving beauty standards, noting that Pixar's updated animation style, particularly in the depiction of motherly characters, aligned with these trends. They also described Helen as a "MILF", referencing her popularity in internet culture. Similarly, Vice's Nicole Clark argued that the trend stemmed from Helen's resemblance to "the living embodiment of our 2018 Instagram-influenced dreams—thicc, flexible, often walking with a hip swivel", and suggested that her design was not intended to sexualize, but rather to symbolize liberation from her former role as a stay-at-home mother.

Some reactions to the phenomenon were positive, and Helen's exaggerated hourglass figure became an unexpected source of body inspiration on social media. Brinton Parker of PopSugar reported that some women claimed the character helped them learn to love their own bodies, while USA Today's Carly Mallenbaum opined that, despite Helen's unrealistic proportions, the combination of her body type and confidence "shows a step in the right direction toward female inclusion on-screen", especially in contrast to Disney's own princess franchise. Joe reported that "In fairness it seems to be mainly women who are admiring Elastigirl's dumb thiccness". Rebecca Jennings of Racked expressed appreciation for the positive response to Helen's design, observing that her exaggerated body type was embraced by both straight and queer women, as a celebration of a physique rarely represented or attainable in reality. She predicted that the character will eventually be "inaugurated into the sexy queer character canon". However, Danny Shaw of Epigram countered that her appearance "seems designed only to fulfil the whimsical, sexual desires" of male cinephiles.

Film critic Anthony Lane's Incredibles 2 review in The New Yorker was widely criticized for its perceived oversexualization of Helen. Lane had first alluded to the character's sexuality in a 2011 Pixar profile, in which he implied that Helen's flexibility was an asset to sexual activity, and suggested that audiences had been suppressing sexual fantasies about her since 2004. In the same article, he described her as "a living joke about society's expectation that women should have it all". Some readers found Lane's review humorous, while others considered it disturbing. Critics generally agreed that Lane's opinions were more suitable for social media, like those of other fans, but deemed them inappropriate for a platform of The New Yorker's prestige. Gabriella Paiella of The Cut and Clark said the internet's fetishization of Helen was hardly limited to Lane's remarks, with Clark reporting that Lane's review only exposed lewd comments fans had already been sharing about the character on social media. Paiella criticized Lane for including overtly sexual commentary about an animated character in a review intended for a respected, mainstream publication, with Vice's Marie Solis suggesting that Lane's article was likely vetted by several editors and fact-checkers before its publication. In 2021, journalist Helen O'Hara said Lane's remarks reflect a broader trend of highly prolific male film critics making "grotesque" comments about female stars in their reviews, comparing his comments to those of David Thompson, Andrew Sarris, Todd McCarthy, and Harry Knowles. The Guardian's Guy Lodge reported that, of those who complained about Lane's article, few disagreed that the character was objectively sexually attractive. Writer Jeet Heer offered a more nuanced take that Lane had poorly articulated an otherwise "decent point" about the gradual pornification of comic book art, which they believe was supported by the impossible anatomy of Incredibles 2's female characters. Kang concurred that Lane's review was in poor taste but argued that the backlash it received was disproportionate, noting that sexualized excerpts were disproportionately emphasized and overshadowed Lane's commentary on other aspects of the character. Jennings observed that those expressing similar sentiments on social media lacked access to "one of the world's most respected magazines", and argued that women who shared these views reclaimed the platform from what "could otherwise be a very depressing place". Vice ranked it one of the "horniest" pop culture moments from 2018.

== In other media ==
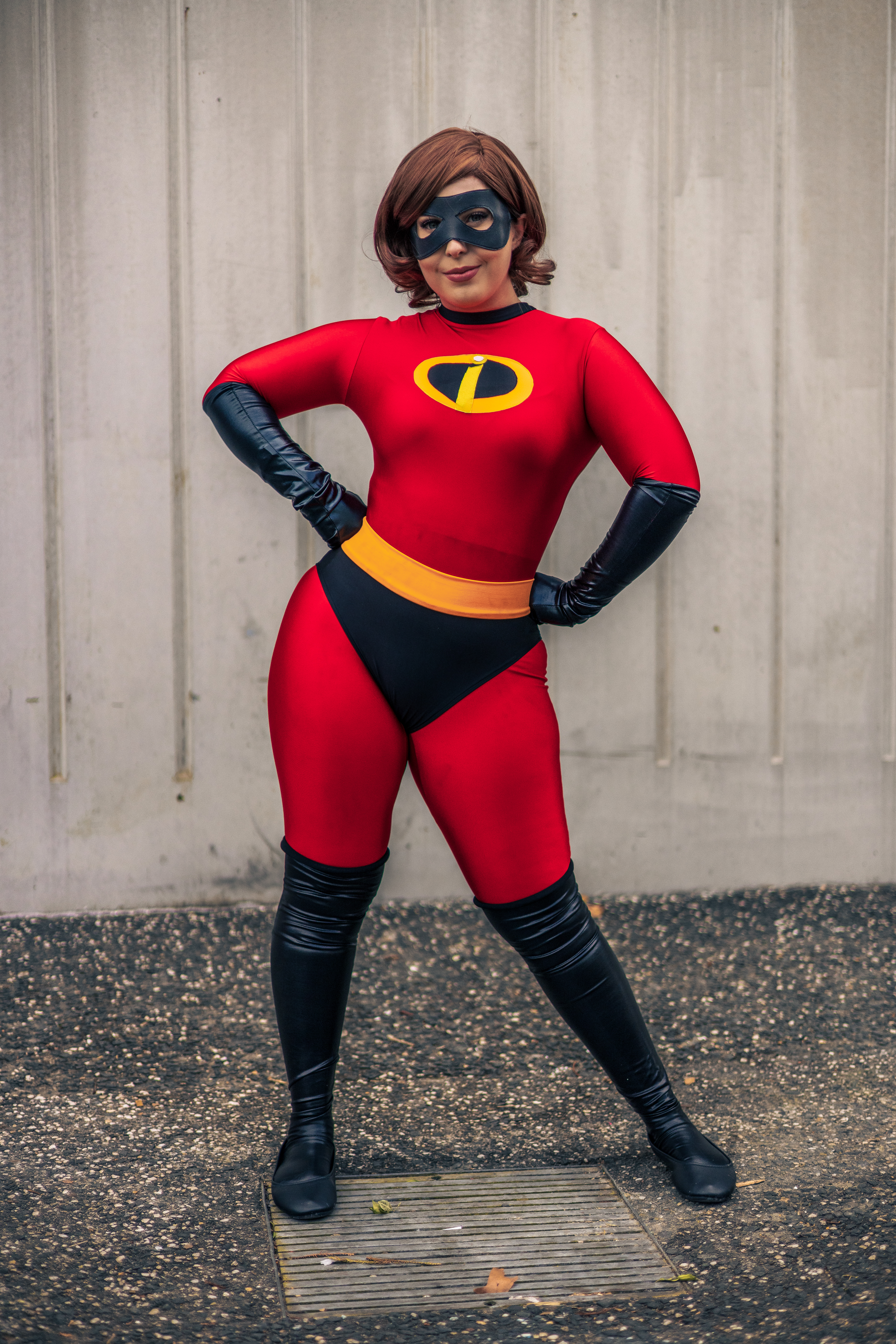
A cosplayer of Elastigirl at Supanova Expo in 2022

To avoid licensing issues with DC's own Elasti-Girl, Disney often markets their character as "Mrs. Incredible" instead of "Elastigirl" on much of their merchandise and promotional tie-ins for The Incredibles. In 2004, Disney installed a two-part billboard advertisement featuring Elastigirl stretching her arm from one panel to the other across a heavily trafficked area. Consumer goods corporation Procter & Gamble used the character to promote several home care brands, portraying her as a "multitasking supermom" who balances household chores with fighting crime, under the tagline "mom to the rescue". A TV spot showed the character performing feats such as bathing her children in the bathroom, while stretching to another part of their house to do laundry. A DVD bonus feature shows Elastigirl participating in a mock interview with Access Hollywood correspondent Nancy O'Dell. Several toys, action figures, and collectables based on the character's likeness have been released to support both films. McDonald's 2004 collaboration with The Incredibles included an Elastigirl Happy Meal toy with long, posable arms. Since at least 2011, Funko has released several vinyl figurines and accessories based on the character. To promote Incredibles 2 and its accompanying toy line, in May 2018, Disney released a vintage-style television commercial highlighting Elastigirl, which features her own theme song.

Elastigirl appears as a playable character in the 2004 video game adaptation of The Incredibles, with her solo missions emphasizing solving puzzles and stretching across distances over direct combat. She is a playable character in Lego The Incredibles (2018), in which she can stretch herself to access remote areas and transform into objects such as bouncy balls and trampolines. Beginning in 2024, the character is playable in the kart racing game Disney Speedstorm (2023). She is also playable in the Disney Infinity toys-to-life video game series, and has a non-speaking cameo in The Incredibles: Rise of the Underminer (2005). In 2024, Elastigirl, Mr. Incredible, and Frozone were added to Fortnite Battle Royale as purchasable skins. A Lego variant of the character was also released.

In Boom! Studios' comic book sequel to The Incredibles, Helen's ex-boyfriend, Xerek, is reimagined as the story's antagonist, but Incredibles 2 renders him non-canonical and obsolete. In 2018, the book Incredibles 2: A Real Stretch: An Elastigirl Prequel Story was released. It was written by Carla Jablonski and explores Helen's fighting crime during the golden age of Supers, prior to the events of The Incredibles. Rapper and singer Lisa included a song, "Elastigirl", on her debut studio album, Alter Ego (2025), inspired by the character.

Performers appear as the character at various Disney Parks, including Pixar Plaza at Disney's Hollywood Studios. Elastigirl is a popular selection for cosplay and fan art. During a Disney-themed episode of American Idol in 2023, singer and judge Katy Perry cosplayed as Elastigirl.

In July 2026, Pixar issued layoff notices for more than 100 employees on Elastigirl-themed letterhead, which featured the character replacing the "i" in the Pixar logo at the top of the document.
