= Craig T. Nelson =

American actor (born 1944)

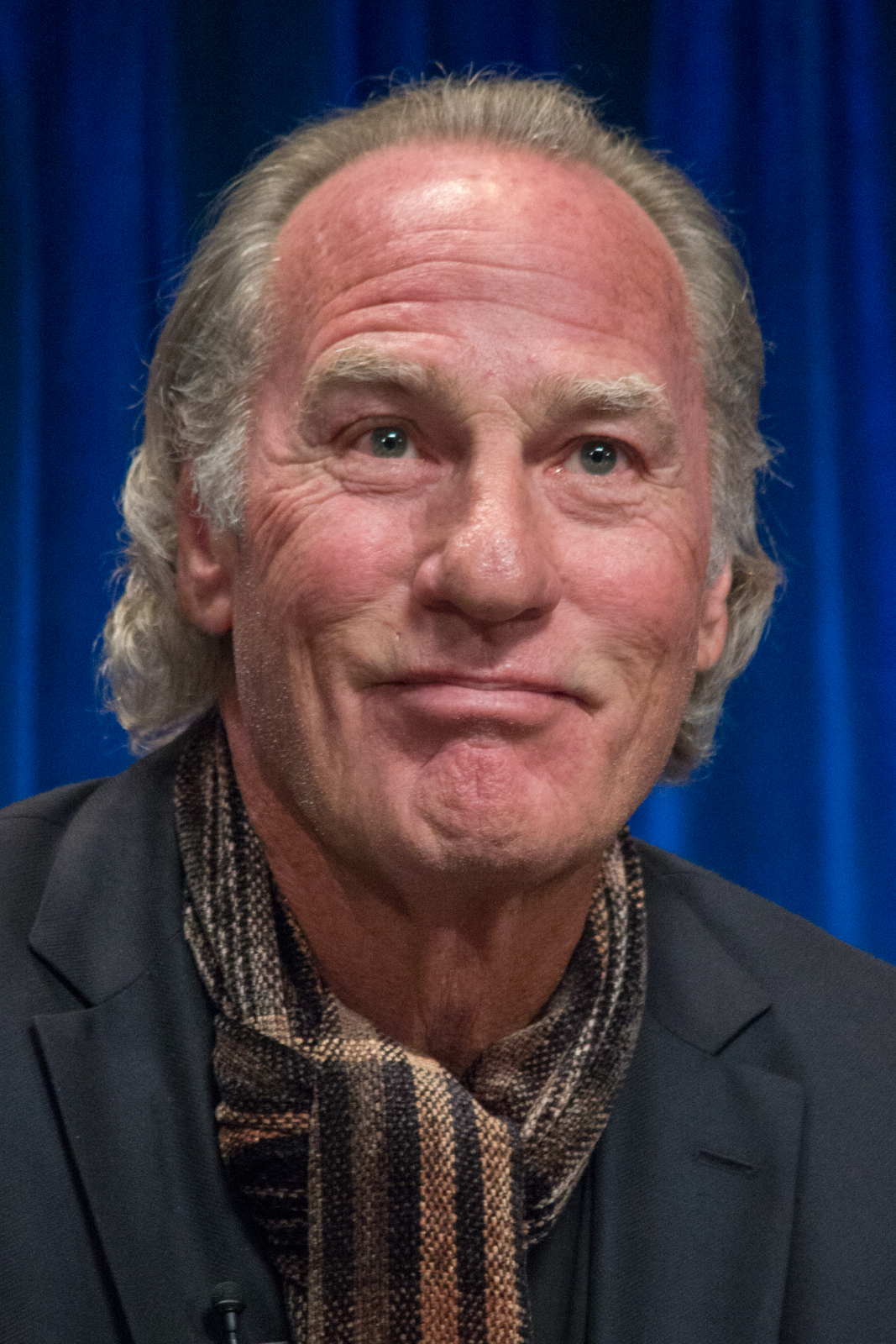
- Nelson at the Paleyfest 2013 panel for Parenthood
- Born: Craig Theodore Nelson; April 4, 1944 (age 82); Spokane, Washington, U.S.
- Occupation: Actor
- Years active: 1971–present
- Spouses: Robin McCarthy (m. 1965; div. 1978); Doria Cook (m. 1987)
- Children: 3

Craig Theodore Nelson (born April 4, 1944) is an American actor. He is known for his roles as Hayden Fox in the ABC sitcom Coach (for which he won a Primetime Emmy Award for Outstanding Lead Actor in a Comedy Series), Deputy Warden Ward Wilson in Stir Crazy (1980), Steve Freeling in Poltergeist (1982), Burt Nickerson in All the Right Moves (1983), Peter Dellaplane in Action Jackson (1988), Chief Howard Hyde in Turner & Hooch (1989), Alex Cullen in The Devil's Advocate (1997), Chief Jack Mannion in the CBS drama The District (2000–2004), Coach Goddard in Blades of Glory (2007), The Warden in the NBC sitcom My Name Is Earl (2007), and the voice of Mr. Incredible in the 2004 film The Incredibles and its 2018 sequel.

Nelson also starred as Zeek Braverman in the NBC drama series Parenthood (2010–2015) and recurred as Dale Ballard in the CBS sitcoms Young Sheldon (2019–2024) and its spin-off Georgie & Mandy's First Marriage (2024–present).

== Early life ==
Craig Theodore Nelson was born on April 4, 1944, in Spokane, Washington. His parents were Vera Margaret (née Spindler), a dancer, and Armand Gilbert Nelson, a businessman.

Nelson attended Lewis and Clark High School, where he played football, baseball, and basketball. Following high school, Nelson studied at Central Washington University. After flunking out, Nelson went to Yakima Valley College where he was inspired to study acting by his drama teacher, Mr. Brady. From Yakima, he went on to study drama at the University of Arizona on a scholarship.

In 1969, Nelson dropped out of school and moved to Hollywood to pursue an acting career. After first moving to California, he took up a job as a security guard at a soap factory until finding work as a comedy writer.

== Career ==
=== Early career ===
Nelson began his show business career as a comedian. He was an early member of The Groundlings improv and sketch comedy troupe. Nelson, Barry Levinson, and Rudy De Luca formed their own comedy team and were regular performers at The Comedy Store and on the short-lived The Tim Conway Comedy Hour (1970). In 1973, Nelson left the comedy world, explaining "the standup comedy life was pretty unfulfilling for me" and he settled in Montgomery Creek, California where there was no electricity and no running water; "it was contentment, The Waltons", he said. Nelson had different jobs during that time including janitor, plumber, carpenter, surveyor, and high school teacher in Burney, CA. He returned to acting five years later.

=== Film ===
Nelson was featured as a prosecuting attorney who opposes Al Pacino in the 1979 film ...And Justice for All, co-written by Levinson. He then played Capt. William Woodbridge in Private Benjamin (1980), Deputy Warden Ward Wilson in Stir Crazy (1980), and Steve Freeling in Poltergeist (1982), returning to the role for the sequel, Poltergeist II: The Other Side (1986). In 1983, Nelson appeared in Silkwood, directed by Mike Nichols and starring Meryl Streep. That same year, he played the high school football coach of Tom Cruise in the drama All the Right Moves and was one of the stars of director Sam Peckinpah's final film, The Osterman Weekend. He appeared in many other motion picture roles including Major Reeves in The Killing Fields (1984), Peter Dellaplane in Action Jackson (1988), Freddy Nefler in Troop Beverly Hills (1989), Chief Howard Hyde in Turner & Hooch (1989), Ed Peters in Ghosts of Mississippi (1996), and Alex Cullen in The Devil's Advocate (1997).

=== Television ===
Nelson's first TV series was the short-lived ABC series Call to Glory from 1984 to 1985. He became well-known when he starred as college football coach Hayden Fox in the ABC sitcom Coach from 1989 to 1997, and for which he won a Primetime Emmy Award for Outstanding Lead Actor in a Comedy Series. He also directed many episodes of the show. He then starred as chief of Washington, D.C.'s police department Jack Mannion in the CBS drama The District from 2000 to 2004. He went on to play the role of the Prison Warden in the NBC sitcom My Name Is Earl in 2007.

=== Later career ===
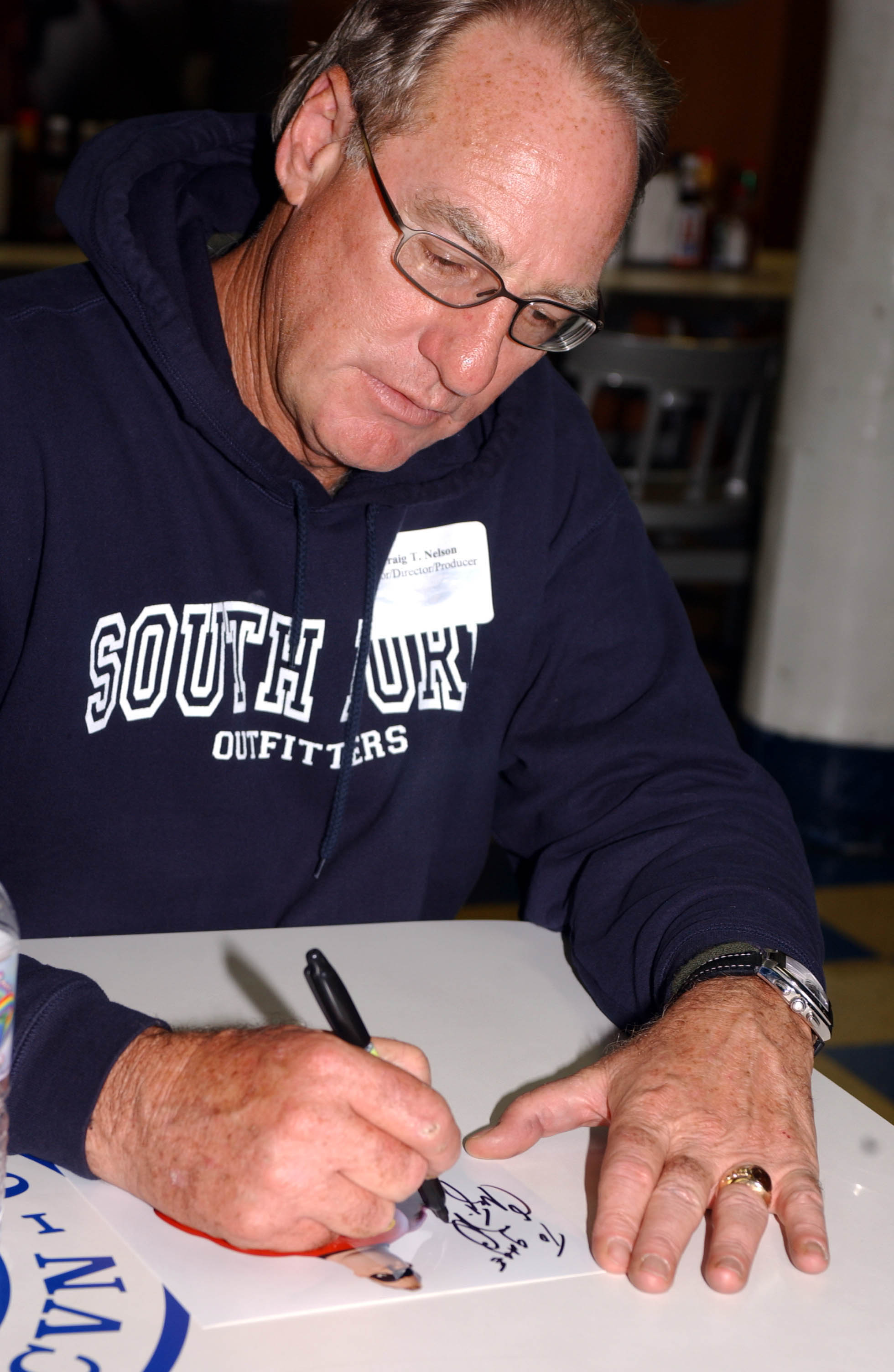
Nelson in 2004

Nelson provided the voice of Bob Parr (also known as Mr. Incredible) in the animated film The Incredibles (2004), and returned to the role for its long awaited sequel, Incredibles 2 (2018). Nelson also reprised the role again in the video games Kinect Rush: A Disney-Pixar Adventure and in the Disney Infinity video game series, except for the video game and The Incredibles: Rise of the Underminer, where he was replaced by actor Richard McGonagle. Nelson will reprise the role again in the third installment.

Nelson's subsequent films include 2005's The Family Stone as Diane Keaton's husband, 2007's Blades of Glory as an ice skating coach, 2009's The Proposal as Ryan Reynolds's skeptical father, 2010's The Company Men as a greedy CEO, and 2018's Book Club.

Nelson made a three-episode guest appearance on CSI: NY from 2008 to 2009 as a "nemesis" of Gary Sinise's Taylor. From 2010 to 2015, he starred in the NBC comedy-drama Parenthood as Ezekiel "Zeek" Braverman, the family patriarch. His production company is Family Tree Productions.

From 2019 to 2024, Nelson was part of the cast of Young Sheldon playing Dale Ballard, a local sports store owner, Missy's baseball coach, and Meemaw's boyfriend. In 2024, he continued the role on its spin-off Georgie & Mandy's First Marriage.

== Personal life ==
Nelson has three children from his first marriage to Robin McCarthy, though they later divorced. His second wife Doria Cook-Nelson is a freelance writer, president of a martial arts association, karate instructor, tai chi teacher, and a former film and television actress who had a featured role in the movie musical Mame.

Nelson is a motorsports fan and an avid racer. He first participated in the 1991 Toyota Celebrity Long Beach Grand Prix and finished ninth. In 1992, he founded Screaming Eagles Racing with John Christie and entered and drove a Toyota-engined Spice SE90 in the IMSA 1994 WSC, a Lexus-engined Spice SE90 in 1995 and a Ford-engined Riley & Scott Mk III in the 1996 and 1997 championships.

Nelson has voiced support for conservative beliefs and politicians. During the 2008 United States presidential election, he endorsed John McCain. In 2009, Nelson appeared on The Glenn Beck Program to announce that he was considering no longer paying income tax. In the same year, he appeared on Hannity to criticize government expansion.

Early in his career, Nelson struggled with alcohol and substance addiction. Nelson is a Christian and runs more than one addiction recovery program through his church.

Nelson is also a lifelong Green Bay Packers fan. On January 5, 2025, he eventually sang the National Anthem at Lambeau Field. He would later tell reporters "Me and the Packers go way back."

== Filmography ==
=== Film ===
Year	Title	Role	Notes
1971	The Return of Count Yorga	Sgt. O'Connor	
1973	Scream Blacula Scream	Sarge	
1974	Flesh Gordon	The Great God Porno	Voice; uncredited
1979	...And Justice for All	Frank Bowers	
1980	Stir Crazy	Deputy Warden Ward Wilson	
1980	The Formula	Geologist #2	
1980	Where the Buffalo Roam	Cop on Stand	
1980	Private Benjamin	Capt. William Woodbridge	
1982	Poltergeist	Steve Freeling	
1983	Man, Woman and Child	Bernie Ackerman	
1983	Silkwood	Winston	
1983	All the Right Moves	Coach Vern Nickerson	
1983	The Osterman Weekend	Bernard Osterman	
1984	The Killing Fields	Major Reeves	
1986	Poltergeist II: The Other Side	Steve Freeling	
1987	Rachel River	Marlyn Huutula	
1987	Red Riding Hood	Sir Godfrey / Percival	
1988	Action Jackson	Peter Dellaplane	
1988	Me and Him	Peter Aramis	
1989	Turner & Hooch	Chief Howard Hyde	
1989	Troop Beverly Hills	Fred Nefler	
1996	Ghosts of Mississippi	Ed Peters	
1996	I'm Not Rappaport	The Cowboy	
1997	The Devil's Advocate	Alexander Cullen	
1997	Wag the Dog	Senator John Neal	Uncredited
2000	The Skulls	Litten Mandrake	
2001	All Over Again	Cole Twain	
2004	The Incredibles	Bob Parr / Mr. Incredible	Voice
2005	Mr. Incredible and Pals	Bob Parr / Mr. Incredible	(commentary edition) Voice
2005	The Family Stone	Kelly Stone	
2007	Blades of Glory	Coach Darren Goddard	
2009	The Proposal	Joe Paxton	
2010	The Company Men	James Salinger	
2011	Soul Surfer	Dr. David Rovinsky	
2015	Get Hard	Martin Barrow	
2016	Gold	Kenny Wells	
2018	Book Club	Bruce Jutsum	
2018	Incredibles 2	Bob Parr / Mr. Incredible	Voice
2018	Auntie Edna	Bob Parr	Voice; Short film
2023	Book Club: The Next Chapter	Bruce Jutsum	
2025	Green and Gold	Buck	
2027	The Families Stone	Kelly Stone	Filming
2028	Incredibles 3	Bob Parr / Mr. Incredible	Voice; In production

=== Television ===
Year	Title	Role	Notes
1973	The Mary Tyler Moore Show	Charlie	Episode: "Mary Richards and the Incredible Plant Lady"
1978	Charlie's Angels	Stone	Episode: "Angels on the Run"
1978	Wonder Woman	Sam	Episode: "The Deadly Sting"
1979	How the West Was Won	Tugger	Episode: "The Rustler"
1979	Diary of a Teenage Hitchhiker	Driver	Television film
1980	The Promise of Love	Major Landau	Television film
1980	The White Shadow	Father Phil	Episode: "A Christmas Story"
1981	Inmates: A Love Story	Daniels	Television film
1981	Murder in Texas	Jack Ramsey	Television film
1981	WKRP in Cincinnati	Charlie Bathgate	Episode: "Out to Lunch"
1981–1982	Private Benjamin	Capt. Braddock / Col. Hogan	3 episodes
1982	Paper Dolls	Michael Caswell	Television film
1982	Chicago Story	Kenneth A. Dutton	Recurring role
1984–1985	Call to Glory	Col. Raynor Sarnac	Main role
1986	Alex: The Life of a Child	Frank Deford	Television film
1986	The Ted Kennedy Jr. Story	Senator Ted Kennedy	Television film
1989	Murderers Among Us: The Simon Wiesenthal Story	Major Bill Harcourt	Television film
1989–1997	Coach	Coach Hayden Fox	Main role
1990	Drug Wars: The Camarena Story	Harley Steinmetz	Miniseries
1990	Extreme Close-Up	Philip	Television film
1991	The Josephine Baker Story	Walter Winchell	Television film
1993	The Switch	Russ Fine	Television film
1993	The Fire Next Time	Drew Morgan	Miniseries
1994	Ride with the Wind	Frank Shelby	Television film
1994	Probable Cause	Lieutenant Louis Whitmire	Television film
1994	The Lies Boys Tell	Larry	Television film
1996	If These Walls Could Talk	Jim Harris	Television film; segment: "1996"
1998	Creature	Dr. Simon Chase	Miniseries
1999	To Serve and Protect	Tom Carr	Miniseries
2000	The Huntress	Ralph Thorson	Episode: "Pilot"
2000	Dirty Pictures	Simon Leis	Television film
2000–2004	The District	Chief Jack Mannion	Main role
2001	Yes, Dear	TV Actor	Episode: "Jimmy's Jimmy"; uncredited
2002	The Agency	Chief Jack Mannion	Episode: "Doublecrossover"
2007	My Name Is Earl	Warden Jerry Hazelwood	4 episodes
2008–2009	CSI: NY	Robert Dunbrook	3 episodes
2009	Monk	Judge Ethan Rickover	2 episodes
2010–2015	Parenthood	Ezekiel "Zeek" Braverman	Main role
2013	Hawaii Five-0	Tyler Cain	Episode: "He welo 'oihana"
2015	Grace and Frankie	Guy	5 episodes
2017	Raised by Wolves	Paul "Grampy" Kosinski	Television film
2019–2024	Young Sheldon	Dale Ballard	Recurring role
2024–2025	Pupstruction	PawPaw	Voice; 2 episodes
2024–present	Georgie & Mandy's First Marriage	Dale Ballard	4 episodes
2025	SpongeBob SquarePants	Coach Cod	Voice; episode: "Pigskin Pearl"

=== Video games ===
Year	Title	Role	Notes
2012	Rush: A Disney-Pixar Adventure	Bob Parr / Mr. Incredible	
2013	Disney Infinity	Bob Parr / Mr. Incredible	
2014	Disney Infinity 2.0	Bob Parr / Mr. Incredible	
2015	Disney Infinity 3.0	Bob Parr / Mr. Incredible	

=== Theme parks ===
Year	Ride	Role	Notes
2018	Incredicoaster	Bob Parr / Mr. Incredible	Voice

=== Theatre ===
Year	Title	Role	Notes
1983–1984	Friends	Harold (Okie) Peterson	
1998	Ah, Wilderness!	Nat Miller	

== Awards and nominations ==
Year	Title	Accolade	Results
1990	Coach	Primetime Emmy Award, Outstanding Lead Actor in a Comedy Series	Nominated
1991	Coach	Primetime Emmy Award, Outstanding Lead Actor in a Comedy Series	Nominated
1992	Coach	Golden Globe Award, Best Lead Actor in a Television Series - Comedy or Musical	Nominated
1992	Coach	Primetime Emmy Award, Outstanding Lead Actor in a Comedy Series	Won
1992	Coach	Viewers for Quality Television Award, Best Actor in a Quality Comedy Series	Nominated
1993	Coach	American Television Award, Best Actor in a Situation Comedy	Nominated
1993	Coach	Golden Globe Award, Best Lead Actor in a Television Series - Comedy or Musical	Nominated
1993	Coach	Viewers for Quality Television Award, Best Actor in a Quality Comedy Series	Nominated
1994	Coach	Golden Globe Award, Best Lead Actor in a Television Series - Comedy or Musical	Nominated
1995	Coach	Golden Globe Award, Best Lead Actor in a Television Series - Comedy or Musical	Nominated
1996	Ghosts of Mississippi	Award Circuit Community Award, Best Cast Ensemble	Nominated
2001	The District	Actor of the Year in a New Series	Nominated
2002	The District	Satellite Award, Best Lead Actor in a Series - Drama	Nominated
2004	The District	Prism Award, Best Performance in a Drama Series Episode	Nominated
2005	The Incredibles	MTV Movie + TV Award, Best On-Screen Team (shared with Holly Hunter, Spencer Fox & Sarah Vowell)	Nominated
2005	The Family Stone	Satellite Award, Best Supporting Actor in a Motion Picture - Comedy or Musical	Nominated
2005	The Incredibles	Visual Effects Society Award, Outstanding Performance by an Animated Character in an Animated Motion Picture	Won
2006	The Family Stone	AARP Movies for Grownups Award, Best Grownup Love Story (shared with Diane Keaton)	Won
2010		Ojai Film Festival Award, Lifetime Achievement award	Won
2012	Parenthood	Prism Award, Male Performance in a Drama Series Multi-Episode Storyline	Won
2015	Parenthood	Critics Choice Television Award, Best Supporting Actor in a Drama Series	Nominated
