= The Incredibles: Rise of the Underminer =

2005 video game

- Developers: Heavy Iron Studios; (PS2, Xbox, GC); Beenox (PC, Mac); Helixe (GBA, NDS)
- Publisher: THQ: JP: Sega
- Director: Gregory Ecklund
- Producers: Stephen Townsend; (PS2, Xbox, GC); Stephane Brault & Dee Brown (PC, Mac)
- Designer: Matt Coohill
- Programmers: Mark Pope (PS2, Xbox, GC); Sylvain Morel (PC, Mac)
- Artist: Scott Chiu
- Writer: Mark Andrews
- Composers: Michael Giacchino; Chris Tilton
- Series: The Incredibles
- Engine: RenderWare
- Platforms: Microsoft Windows; Mac OS X; Game Boy Advance; PlayStation 2; Xbox; GameCube; Nintendo DS
- Release: NA: October 24, 2005 (PC, Mac); NA: November 1, 2005; EU: November 11, 2005 (GBA, PC, PS2, Xbox); EU: November 25, 2005 (GC, NDS); JP: February 9, 2006 (PS2, GC, GBA, NDS)
- Genres: Action-adventure, beat 'em up
- Modes: Single-player, multiplayer

The Incredibles: Rise of the Underminer is a 2005 action-adventure video game which serves as an alternative sequel to the animated film The Incredibles (2004) as well as its associated video game tie-in. The GameCube, PlayStation 2, and Xbox versions were developed by Heavy Iron Studios, while Beenox handled the Microsoft Windows and Mac OS X versions, and the Game Boy Advance and Nintendo DS versions were developed by Helixe. A PlayStation Portable version developed by Pacific Coast Power & Light was also announced but never released. It features Mr. Incredible and Frozone fighting The Underminer's legion of robot minions. The game features cameo appearances by the rest of the Incredibles, though they are not playable characters and have no spoken lines. John Ratzenberger reprises his role of the Underminer in the video game, while Craig T. Nelson and Samuel L. Jackson are replaced by Richard McGonagle and Philip Lawrence as Mr. Incredible and Frozone, respectively. This is the first Pixar game to earn an E10+ rating by the ESRB.

Following the release of Incredibles 2 (2018), the events of this video game became non-canon.

== Storyline ==
The game picks up directly where the movie ended, as The Underminer drills out of the ground and declares his intention to rule the world. The Incredibles prepare to battle him when Frozone arrives. Mr. Incredible orders the rest of the Incredibles to take care of the Underminer's minions while he and Frozone defeat him. The two reach the Underminer's machine, but he quickly escapes underground. Mr. Incredible and Frozone pursue him. The two discover a computer containing the Underminer's plans and learn that he has created the Magnomizer, intending to reverse the position of the Earth's crust and fill the sky with extreme pollution to create an artificial underground.

Mr. Incredible and Frozone make their way to the Sludge Station, where the Magnomizer is located. After defeating the Magnomizer Guardian, they reach the roof of the Magnomizer and destroy it. As the entire Magnomizer building begins to collapse, Mr. Incredible and Frozone quickly escape through a giant drill, and it falls down a deep pit the machine makes when it falls through the ground. The Underminer, aware that Mr. Incredible and Frozone have destroyed the Magnomizer, activates the Crustodian, his most powerful robot. The Underminer begins his backup plan to create 100 giant Gilgenbots to conquer the world with. Mr. Incredible and Frozone fight their way to the Crustodian, destroying three Gilgenbots in the process. The Crustodian decides to cover up its failure by destroying the other 96 Gilgenbots. After defeating the Crustodian, who escapes, Mr. Incredible and Frozone take an elevator down to an underwater plant that originally supplied power to the Magnomizer, and now powers the Corrupterator, a giant machine meant to help the Underminer further his world-dominating goals.

Mr. Incredible and Frozone encounter a friendly robot named Dug who agrees to help them save a group of scientists that are trapped in the Corrupterator. Dug sabotages the Corrupterator and opens an elevator that leads Mr. Incredible and Frozone to the scientists. They rescue the captive scientists and confront the Underminer, but he escapes in the last remaining Gilgenbot. Mr. Incredible and Frozone take an elevator back to the surface on a rainy night, where the Underminer confronts them while piloting a smaller personal battle mech, with help from the Gilgenbot. After a struggle, the heroes finally defeat the Underminer, knocking him into the Gilgenbot and destroying both of them in a massive explosion. No sooner after the Underminer's demise, the rest of the Incredibles arrive to celebrate saving the world once more.

The game also has three bonus levels such as trying to protect the scientists from the Underminer's robots or trying to stop the drills in a parking lot.

== Reception ==
Reception

Aggregate scores
Aggregator	Score					
Aggregator	DS	GBA	GameCube	PC	PS2	Xbox
GameRankings	55%	54%	70%	69%	59%	59%
Metacritic	54/100	N/A	67/100	65/100	60/100	63/100

Review scores
Publication	Score					
Publication	DS	GBA	GameCube	PC	PS2	Xbox
Eurogamer	N/A	N/A	N/A	N/A	6/10	N/A
Famitsu	23/40	19/40	27/40	N/A	27/40	N/A
GameZone	6/10	N/A	N/A	N/A	N/A	N/A
IGN	6.3/10	N/A	6/10	6/10	6/10	6/10
Nintendo Power	5.5/10	N/A	7.5/10	N/A	N/A	N/A
Official U.S. PlayStation Magazine	N/A	N/A	N/A	N/A	2.5/5	N/A
Official Xbox Magazine (UK)	N/A	N/A	N/A	N/A	N/A	5/10
PALGN	N/A	N/A	N/A	N/A	4/10	N/A
PC Gamer (UK)	N/A	N/A	N/A	66%	N/A	N/A
TeamXbox	N/A	N/A	N/A	N/A	N/A	7.2/10
The Sydney Morning Herald	N/A	N/A	N/A	N/A	2.5/5	N/A

The game received "mixed or average reviews" on all platforms according to the review aggregation website Metacritic. In Japan, where Sega published the game on the GameCube, Nintendo DS, Game Boy Advance, and PlayStation 2 on February 9, 2006, Famitsu gave it a score of three sevens and one six for the GameCube and PlayStation 2 versions; one seven, one six, and two fives for the DS version; and one six, one five, and two fours for the Game Boy Advance version.
