= Mr. Incredible and Pals =

2005 American animated short film

- A scene from the film
- Directed by: Roger L. Gould; Brad Bird (commentary)
- Written by: Roger L. Gould; Brad Bird (commentary)
- Produced by: Ann Brilz
- Starring: Craig T. Nelson; Samuel L. Jackson; Pete Docter; Michael Asberry; Celia Schuman
- Narrated by: Roger L. Jackson
- Edited by: Steve Bloom
- Music by: Alex Mandel
- Production company: Pixar Animation Studios
- Distributed by: Walt Disney Home Entertainment
- Release date: March 15, 2005 (The Incredibles DVD)
- Running time: 4 minutes
- Country: United States
- Language: English

Mr. Incredible and Pals (also known as The Adventures of Mr. Incredible) is a 2005 American animated short film produced by Pixar which was included as a bonus feature on the DVD release of its 2004 feature film The Incredibles. It features the characters of Mr. Incredible and Frozone from the feature, plus a "cute animal" rabbit sidekick named Mr. Skipperdoo, chasing and capturing the supervillain Lady Lightbug.

== Plot ==
The episode begins with Mr. Incredible, Frozone, and Mr. Skipperdoo looking over the site of the West River Bridge, which has been stolen, leaving cars stuck on both sides of the river. When Mr. Skipperdoo finds a rivet from the missing bridge, Mr. Incredible discovers it is radioactive and denounces the culprit to be the villainess Lady Lightbug (described by Mr. Incredible as "sinister, yet lovely"). Vowing to amend the situation, Frozone builds a temporary bridge of ice to keep the traffic going, and the three skate away to find their nemesis.

Arriving at an abandoned fairground, Mr. Incredible searches for Lady Lightbug by lifting up various buildings but cannot find her under any of them. Mr. Skipperdoo hops to point out that the missing bridge is above him. Suddenly, Lady Lightbug flies out and informs them all of her evil plan to steal the free world's bridges, creating massive traffic jams and thus destroying their economies. She then proceeds to shoot a line of radioactive silk out of her abdomen, ensnaring Frozone. Mr. Incredible throws a Ferris wheel at her, to which she dodges. He then hops in a roller coaster, which takes off flying toward Lady Lightbug. Mr. Incredible then knocks her out of the air, defeating her.

The missing bridge is restored and everything returns to normal thanks to Mr. Incredible, Frozone, and Mr. Skipperdoo; Mr. Incredible adds, "and democracy." Meanwhile, on top of the bridge, Lady Lightbug is trapped in a large jar and imprecates the heroes for her imprisonment. The end of the episode features a brief teaser of the next episode which features a gigantic anthropomorphic ear of corn yelling, "I'll crush you, Mr. Incredible!" before laughing evilly as the two prepare to fight.

=== Commentary ===
In addition to the many in-jokes and animation references included in this film, Craig T. Nelson and Samuel L. Jackson provided a DVD commentary for the fictional show, acting in character as Mr. Incredible and Frozone as if sitting down and watching the cartoon for the first time. The in-universe background behind Mr. Incredible and Pals stated that several years before the Supers were banned, Mr. Incredible and Frozone licensed their names and images to a television animation company, and this was the pilot episode for an animated television series that never aired due to the Super ban. The two supers are watching this pilot for the first time several years after it was produced.

The commentary of the two characters provides additional entertainment for the DVD's viewers, as they react with shock and disbelief to the poor quality of the film. While Mr. Incredible tries to remain optimistic for the show and makes excuses for its terrible quality, Frozone is aghast and disgusted at its campiness and supposed racism (the show's version of himself appears to be white, or "tan" as Mr. Incredible claims). He is also annoyed by Mr. Skipperdoo (an opinion shared by Mr. Incredible) and Lady Lightbug. By the end of the short, Frozone is so annoyed that he walks out of the commentary at the end, demanding the episode never be aired.

== Cast ==
- Roger Jackson as The Narrator and Evil Cornhead
- Pete Docter as Mr. Incredible
- Michael Asberry as Frozone
- Celia Schuman as Lady Lightbug

Commentary

- Craig T. Nelson as Mr. Incredible
- Samuel L. Jackson as Frozone

== Background and production ==
The film is animated in the style of limited animation that intentionally parodies the low budget and low-quality television Saturday-morning cartoons that aired regularly during the 1950s and 1960s. During this time, television animation studios were contracted to turn out high quantities of product on low budgets, which resulted in many television cartoons that have been derided and mocked by television critics, film, and animation historians, and audiences in general. Mr. Incredible and Pals uses a number of the cost-saving techniques and tropes found in these shows, such as:

- Still shots of drawn scenes, rather than actual frame-by-frame animation.
- Actual footage of live actors' mouths moving instead of animated lips on the characters, a technique known as Synchro-Vox. The most well-known example of this form of "animation" was the Clutch Cargo series.
- A Cold War era plot pitting true, freedom-loving American superheroes against a stereotypical "Communist" supervillain.
- The sidekick (which Frozone is portrayed as) being ensnared by the supervillain so that complete emphasis can be placed on the main hero, who nevertheless thanks the sidekick for his involvement in stopping the villain.
- Frozone speaking in forced "beatnik" slang, showing the out-of-touch depiction of minority characters in animated works at the time.
- A "cute animal" sidekick only added for "children's appeal." In this film, a glasses-wearing rabbit named Mr. Skipperdoo does nothing but hop up and down, yet his actions are seen as crucial to solving the "mystery" that comprises the plot of the episode.

Mr. Incredible and Pals is the first of three short films produced by Pixar Animation Studios, which were animated in traditional 2D hand-drawn animation rather than computer animation. The second film, Your Friend the Rat, was produced in 2007, and included as part of the DVD release of Ratatouille. The third, Day & Night, produced in 2010, was theatrically released with Toy Story 3. The latter two films feature a combination of hand-drawn and CGI animation.

== References in other media ==
In the Disney kart racing video game Disney Speedstorm, Mr. Skipperdoo and Lady Lightbug were added as non-playable crew members that boost players' stats in the December 2024 "Save the World" update, themed after The Incredibles franchise.
