= Mr. Incredible =

Fictional character from The Incredibles franchise

Robert Parr Mr. Incredible
- The Incredibles character
- Bob Parr/Mr. Incredible as he appears in Incredibles 2
- First appearance: The Incredibles (2004)
- Created by: Brad Bird
- Voiced by: Craig T. Nelson (films, Kinect Rush: A Disney-Pixar Adventure, Disney Infinity series, Incredicoaster, commercials); Pete Docter (Mr. Incredible and Pals); Richard McGonagle (video games); Jeff Bergman (Lego The Incredibles)

In-universe information
- Full name: Robert Parr
- Alias: Mr. Incredible
- Nickname: Bob
- Species: Human
- Occupation: Superhero; Claims adjuster (formerly)
- Spouse: Helen Parr (wife)
- Children: Violet Parr (daughter/eldest child); Dash Parr (eldest son); Jack-Jack Parr (youngest son)
- Nationality: American
- Abilities: Superhuman strength; Near invulnerability; Danger sense; Skilled strategist; Enhanced speed and agility; Expert hand-to-hand combatant; Super accuracy

Robert "Bob" Parr, also known as Mr. Incredible, is a fictional superhero who appears in Pixar's animated superhero film The Incredibles (2004) and Incredibles 2 (2018). He is a superhero who possesses superhuman strength, durability, and stamina. He is married to Helen Parr, also known as Elastigirl, and has three children named Violet, Dash, and Jack-Jack. He is voiced by Craig T. Nelson in the films, while in Mr. Incredible and Pals and the video games, he is voiced by Pete Docter, Richard McGonagle, and Jeff Bergman. He was created by writer/director, Brad Bird, and is partly based on Bird's father, with Bird stating, "He's a little bit like my dad, because my dad was a great guy, really funny and smart, and I love him dearly".

== Development ==
Mr. Incredible is voiced by Craig T. Nelson. Nelson had always wondered about wanting to do a voice role after he recalled seeing The Iron Giant again; he did his voicework when not working on The District, which he was starring in at the time of the sessions, which took over two years. Nelson would reprise the role again in its 2018 sequel. In video games, he is voiced by Richard McGonagle.

== Appearances ==
=== Films ===
==== The Incredibles ====
On the day he is set to marry his fiancée Helen (also known as Elastigirl), Bob Parr (also known as Mr. Incredible) rescues a falling man from suicide by catching him and diving through a window of the skyscraper he is jumping from. Inadvertently discovering that the skyscraper is being robbed by a supervillain called Bomb Voyage, he confronts the villain, when a young fan of Mr. Incredible, Buddy Pine, flies in with rocket boots. Bob rejects him as his sidekick, Buddy impulsively tries to help anyway, Bomb Voyage sneaks a bomb onto Buddy's cape, and Bob is forced to let Bomb Voyage go to save Buddy. This results in the bomb exploding on an elevated track, and Bob stops a train from falling off the track, nevertheless injuring dozens. Bob's collateral damage lawsuits turn public opinion against superheroes. The government initiates the Superhero Relocation Program, forcing "supers" to abandon their exploits.

Fifteen years later, Bob, Helen, and their children Violet, Dash, and Jack-Jack live in the city of Metroville and keep their superpowers secret. Bob has trouble adapting to civilian life. He is often absorbed in superhero news and is an absent-minded father. He also drags his increasingly reluctant best friend Lucius Best (also known as Frozone) into reliving "the glory days" by being vigilantes every Wednesday night, lying to both of their wives. At work, Bob is an insurance adjuster, often giving clients in-depth knowledge of bureaucratic loopholes at the cost of his own company. During a lecture in his supervisor, Gilbert Huph's office, Bob notices and attempts to stop someone getting mugged but Huph threatens to fire him, causing Bob to hospitalize him by throwing him through several walls. The government keeps the incident quiet, and Bob does not tell Helen about being fired.

Bob also receives a message from a white-haired woman named Mirage asking him to fight an Omnidroid, a tripod-like robot that has gone rogue, in exchange for money which would have far exceeded his annual salary. Bob secretly takes up the offer, claiming to Helen that he is going to a business conference. He flies to an island called Nomanisan, defeating the robot after learning its armor can only be pierced by its own weapons. After returning from battling with the droid, Bob starts to get into shape, expecting more work from Mirage. He takes his damaged old superhero costume to designer Edna Mode, who also makes new superhero costumes for the entire family. Bob is personally revitalized after this, lavishing attention and gifts on his family. Helen becomes suspicious before Bob's second trip to Nomanisan, partially hearing Mirage on the phone and noticing a white hair on his old superhero costume, as well as Edna's repair stitches.

On his second trip to Nomanisan, Bob learns that Mirage is working for Buddy, who is now going by the superhero name Syndrome. Syndrome's new Omnidroid overwhelms Bob, although he manages to escape and evade detection. As he infiltrates Syndrome's base, he learns that many of the supers from the past had been killed by Syndrome and the Omnidroid's predecessors, and also of Syndrome's plan to unleash an Omnidroid on Metroville. Meanwhile, Helen visits Edna and discovers that Bob has both been fired, and has been doing hero work behind her back. She activates a beacon Edna built into the suits to find Bob, inadvertently causing him to be captured while still inside Syndrome's base. Helen borrows a private plane to travel to Nomanisan, with Violet and Dash as stowaways. After the family is reunited, they escape to Metroville with Mirage's help, and Bob reconciles with his family, apologizing for being an absent-minded father. Together, Frozone and the Parrs fight to stop the Omnidroid and destroy it. When returning home, the Parrs figure out that Syndrome is trying to kidnap Jack-Jack, but Jack-Jack's own shapeshifting superpowers manifest and he escapes. Syndrome is sucked into a jet turbine by his own cape. Three months later, the Parrs witness the arrival of a new supervillain, the Underminer, and instead of hiding their powers, put on their masks.

==== Incredibles 2 ====
The Incredibles and Frozone battle The Underminer and successfully prevent him from destroying City Hall, but are unable to stop him from robbing a bank and escaping. The collateral damage gives the jealous government the perfect excuse to shut down the Superhero Relocation Program, denying the Parrs and other superheroes financial assistance. Violet's love interest Tony Rydinger discovers her superhero identity, causing agent Rick Dicker to erase his memory of her.

Wealthy businessman Winston Deavor and his sister Evelyn, who run the media and telecommunications giant DevTech, propose secret missions for superheroes which will be recorded and publicized to regain public trust. Winston chooses the less accident prone Elastigirl over Mr. Incredible for the initial missions. Bob struggles in his new role as a stay-at-home parent: trying to help Dash with math homework, Violet's heartache over Tony standing her up for their first date (due to his memory wipe), and Jack-Jack wreaking havoc with his burgeoning superpowers. Edna Mode develops a suit to help control Jack-Jack's abilities. Meanwhile, Elastigirl encounters supervillain "the Screenslaver", who projects hypnotic images via TV screens. After preventing him from destroying a crowded commuter train, and thwarting his attempt to assassinate an ambassador, she tracks him to an apartment building and unmasks him as a pizza deliveryman who claims to have no recollection of his actions.

At a party celebrating the Screenslaver's arrest, Winston announces a summit of world leaders to legalize superheroes, hosted aboard his luxury yacht, the Everjust. Elastigirl discovers that the arrested pizza deliveryman is not Screenslaver but was being controlled by hypnotic goggles. Evelyn forces the goggles onto Elastigirl, revealing herself to be the Screenslaver. While keeping her restrained via a chair in a freezing cold room to limit her stretching abilities, Evelyn explains her grudge against superheroes since her father was killed by burglars while trying to call superheroes for help instead of hiding, during the banning and relocation of superheroes 15 years before; (unlike Winston who rightfully believed the lack of superheroes was the reason) and her mother's subsequent death due to heartache. She plans to sabotage her brother's summit by causing a catastrophe to irreparably tarnish the reputation of all superheroes, ensuring they remain outlawed forever and the public will not return to relying on superheroes to handle crises. She lures Bob into a trap and sends a group of hypnotized superheroes to subdue the Parr children. Frozone tries to protect them but is overwhelmed.

Violet, Dash, and Jack-Jack escape in a refurbished Incredibile, the supercar once owned by their father, and reach Winston's yacht. On board, the hypnotized Mr. Incredible, Elastigirl, and Frozone recite a vindictive manifesto on air designed to paint superheroes as a threat, and then subdue the ship's crew, aim the yacht at the city, and destroy the controls. Jack-Jack removes Elastigirl's goggles; she in turn frees Mr. Incredible and Frozone. The Incredibles and Frozone release the other mind-controlled superheroes, and all work together to turn the yacht from crashing into the city. Elastigirl apprehends Evelyn attempting to escape in a jet. Superheroes regain legal status around the world.

Some time later, Tony accompanies Violet to a movie with the family. When the Parrs spot a carload of bank robbers, Violet leaves Tony at the theater, promising to be back in time, and the Incredibles suit up and give chase in their Incredibile.

== Reception ==
Bob has received a generally positive reception from reviewers. Scott Nye of Slant Magazine praised the maturity of his story arc, particularly his rejection of his job in pursuit of his dream and his acknowledgement of his responsibilities to his family. The Austin Chronicle considered Bob's yearnings to return to his old superhero life to be realistic and touching. Stephanie Zacharek from Time positively commented on the realism of Bob in Incredibles 2 as an exhausted stay-at-home father and considered his adjustment to his wife's superhero work to be an exploration of the fragile male ego. Staff at The Ringer had a mixed response when assessing Bob's parenting skills but found him to be a competent father who attempts to fix his mistakes and learns about the challenges of raising children. In a Forbes review of Incredibles 2, staff writer Scott Mendelson thought that the role reversal of Bob and Helen's working life was handled with sensitivity and noted that Bob is not depicted as a completely incapable father, but instead attempts to better himself to be a responsible parent, even asking for help from others when necessary. Film critic Mark Kermode felt that middle-aged viewers would be able to identify with Bob's parenting struggles and the challenges of feeling sidelined.

== In popular culture ==
In September 2021, Mr. Incredible became the subject of an internet meme commonly referred to as "Mr. Incredible Becoming Uncanny". The meme features an illustration of Bob Parr, who becomes more traumatized, distorted and horrific. In 2022, the meme got more popular and more phases were added, including the sequel, "Mr. Incredible Becoming Canny". He becomes happy/ascended instead of traumatized.
