= The Incredibles (video game) =

2004 video game

- Developers: Heavy Iron Studios (PS2/GC/Xbox) (Note: Ported to Mac OS X and Windows by Beenox); Helixe (GBA)
- Publisher: THQ (Note: Published by Aspyr for Mac OS X)
- Director: Shiraz Akmal
- Producers: Stephen Townsend; Nabil Yared & Dee Brown (PC, Mac)
- Designer: Kirk Tome
- Programmers: Daniel Sass; Sylvain Morel (PC, Mac)
- Artists: Alex Carbonero; Jeffrey Berting
- Writer: Mark Andrews
- Composer: Michael Giacchino (Note: Additional music by Chris Tilton and Tim Simonec)
- Series: The Incredibles
- Engine: RenderWare
- Platforms: Game Boy Advance; GameCube; Mac OS X; PlayStation 2; Windows; Xbox
- Release: NA: November 1, 2004; EU: November 5, 2004; AU: November 16, 2004
- Genres: Action-adventure, beat 'em up, platformer
- Mode: Single-player

The Incredibles is an action-adventure video game based on Disney/Pixar's 2004 film of the same name developed by Heavy Iron Studios and published by THQ. The game was released for the Game Boy Advance, GameCube, Mac OS X, PlayStation 2, Windows and Xbox. Samuel L. Jackson (Frozone/Lucius Best), Spencer Fox (Dash), Sarah Vowell (Violet), and Jason Lee (Buddy Pine/Syndrome/Incrediboy) reprise their roles from the film, with the rest of the cast being replaced by different voice actors. The game's music was composed by Michael Giacchino, who also scored the film.

== Gameplay ==
The gameplay is split into levels with the player controlling a different member of the Incredible family in each stage. Mr. Incredible has platform-based gameplay that features hand-to-hand combat and flipping switches to advance to new areas. Mrs. Incredible's gameplay utilizes the character's stretch powers to swing through her surroundings as well as attacking foes. As Violet, the player uses her invisibility powers to sneak past obstacles and enemies in stealth-based levels. When controlling Dash, the fast-moving son of the Incredibles, levels are focused on racing and timed gameplay.

The Xbox version of the game has an extra level that was able to be downloaded via Xbox Live.

== Plot ==
The mime-styled, French supervillain Bomb Voyage attempts a bank heist in the fictional American city of Metroville. Bob Parr, alias Mr. Incredible, guided by his friend, the ice-powered superhero Frozone (secretly Lucius Best), works to stop his plans. Meanwhile, the metamorphic heroine Elastigirl (secretly Helen Truax), battles against Voyage's mime minions across the Metroville skyline stretch. Mr. Incredible captures Bomb Voyage in the bank when his fanboy, Buddy Pine, shows up. Mr. Incredible is dismissive of Buddy Pine, and Bomb Voyage plants a bomb on Buddy's cape. Buddy flies away with his rocket boots to notify the police. Mr. Incredible notices the bomb on Buddy's cape and grabs hold of Buddy. Mr. Incredible and the bomb both fall onto a rooftop, where the bomb detonates harmlessly as Bomb Voyage appears in a helicopter. Voyage attempts to kill Mr. Incredible with bombs, rockets and laser beams, but Mr. Incredible throws the bombs back at the helicopter, causing it to spin wildly out of control, heavily damaged. Bomb Voyage flees the scene.

Fifteen years later, superheroes across America have been long-since sued and outlawed for causing too much public destruction and are forced by the US government (chiefly the CIA) to permanently remain in their civilian identities and live normal lives. Mr. Incredible has married Elastigirl, who has become Helen Parr, and they have three children together: Violet (who possesses force-field and invisibility powers), Dash (a 190+ mph speedster), and Jack-Jack (who does not appear to have obtained any superhuman abilities).

After narrowly escaping an apartment inferno on an illegal heroic excursion with Frozone, Mr. Incredible is approached by a mysterious woman named Mirage, who tells him about a secret organization based on a remote South Pacific island called Nomanisan. Meanwhile, Dash is late for school and has to race through the Metroville traffic to reach his school on time.

The organization's latest invention, the Omnidroid Mark 08, is endangering the island and its personnel. After a rough beach landing on Nomanisan Island, Mr. Incredible encounters numerous hostile robots before he finds and destroys the Omnidroid during a volcanic eruption. The battle is witnessed by Mirage and her anonymous employer through the eyes of a robotic bird. The shadowy employer remarks that Mr. Incredible's victory is surprising, and asks Mirage to issue him new assignments.

After weeks of rigorous training and having received an improved suit from superhero tailor Edna Mode, Mr. Incredible returns to Nomanisan well-prepared for another mission. When he reaches the conference room, he fights through numerous armed security guards, deadly robots and laser systems in the robot arena, but once he reaches the empty meeting room, an improved Omnidroid (the Mark 09), appears from behind a huge sliding wall and grabs Mr. Incredible, overpowering and trapping him. The Omnidroid's creator, Syndrome, appears, who is Mirage's secret employer and reveals himself to be an adult Buddy Pine. He wants revenge on Mr. Incredible by killing off him and the world's other superheroes. Mr. Incredible is remorseful for his treatment of Syndrome, and escapes his clutches by jumping off the great falls. He evades Syndrome's life-sign scanner by hiding behind the skeletal remains of his superhero friend Gazerbeam (whom Syndrome had previously dispatched in an undersea cave). He is later captured and imprisoned in Syndrome's base when he breaks into the villain's secret computer room, learning of Syndrome's plans to unleash his perfected Omnidroid (the Mark 10) on Metroville. Syndrome then intends to take credit for stopping the robot and saving the city, tarnishing the reputations of Mr. Incredible and his allies in the process, before he becomes the world's only super using his weaponized inventions.

Elastigirl flies to Nomanisan island to rescue her husband and safely stores a stowed-away Violet and Dash in a cave, sneaking into Syndrome's complex. She works her way through the hidden base and into Syndrome's volcanic lair. The next morning, Violet and Dash accidentally activate a robotic cockatoo's alarm system and are forced to use their powers to escape Syndrome's guards. After a 100-mile dash through the jungle and across the beaches and lakes of the island, and Violet's crossing of Syndrome's henchmen (thanks to the use of her invisibility), the two learn not to be ashamed of their powers and work together, combining their abilities to form the Incredi-ball. They battle henchmen and robots, eventually finding their parents, with Mirage having had a change of heart and freeing Mr. Incredible.

As the Incredible family meets up outside the secret lava labs, Mirage helps them activate and launch one of Syndrome's rockets from the rocket silo, which they use to reach Metroville, where the Omnidroid is wreaking havoc on the populace. The Incredibles and Frozone work together to destroy the robot, stop Syndrome and save the world. Syndrome escapes from the battle in the city, but is killed offscreen when he attempts to kidnap Jack-Jack Parr as revenge. The Incredibles meet with their family friend and CIA agent Rick Dicker, who acquits and relieves them of their lives as superheroes in hiding, and they are loved by the public again for their efforts.

== Reception ==
Reception

Aggregate score
| Aggregator | Score | | | | |
| Aggregator | GBA | GameCube | PC | PS2 | Xbox |
|---|---|---|---|---|---|
| Metacritic | 55/100 | 63/100 | 55/100 | 62/100 | 64/100 |

Review scores
| Publication | Score | | | | |
| Publication | GBA | GameCube | PC | PS2 | Xbox |
|---|---|---|---|---|---|
| Electronic Gaming Monthly | N/A | 6.33/10 | N/A | 6.33/10 | 6.33/10 |
| Eurogamer | N/A | N/A | N/A | 4/10 | N/A |
| Famitsu | 23/40 | N/A | N/A | 29/40 | N/A |
| Game Informer | N/A | 6.5/10 | N/A | 6.5/10 | 6.5/10 |
| GameRevolution | N/A | C | N/A | C | C |
| GameSpot | 6.3/10 | 6.1/10 | N/A | 6.1/10 | 6.1/10 |
| GameSpy | 2.5/5 | 3.5/5 | N/A | 3.5/5 | 3.5/5 |
| GameZone | 7/10 | 7/10 | 7/10 | 7/10 | 6.9/10 |
| IGN | N/A | 6.5/10 | 6.5/10 | 6.5/10 | 6.5/10 |
| Nintendo Power | 3.2/5 | 3.7/5 | N/A | N/A | N/A |
| Official U.S. PlayStation Magazine | N/A | N/A | N/A | 3.5/5 | N/A |
| Official Xbox Magazine (US) | N/A | N/A | N/A | N/A | 8.2/10 |
| PC Gamer (US) | N/A | N/A | 49% | N/A | N/A |
| The Sydney Morning Herald | N/A | 2.5/5 | N/A | 2.5/5 | 2.5/5 |

The Incredibles received "mixed" reviews on all platforms according to the review aggregation website Metacritic. In Japan, where it was ported on December 2, 2004, Famitsu gave it a score of 29 out of 40 for the PlayStation 2 version, and 23 out of 40 for the Game Boy Advance version.

Electronic Gaming Monthly called it a "reasonably entertaining" but "underwhelming" experience with "boring levels", "sluggish controls", "annoying, timed puzzles", "steep difficulty", and "cheap deaths". IGN reviewer Juan Castro gave it a 6.5 "okay" score, saying that the game "nails the feel of the movie and boasts varied gameplay" but that "sloppy control and tired gameplay muddles the experience."

=== Sales ===
According to the NPD Group, The Incredibles was one of the best-selling movie-based video games from 2004 to 2005, generating $57.4 million in profit. In the United States, The Incredibles' Game Boy Advance release sold 1 million copies and earned $29 million by August 2006. During the period between January 2000 and August 2006, it was the 15th highest-selling game launched for the Game Boy Advance, Nintendo DS or PlayStation Portable in that country.

By July 2006, the PlayStation 2 version of The Incredibles had sold 740,000 copies and earned $24 million in the United States. Next Generation ranked it as the 87th highest-selling game launched for the PlayStation 2, Xbox or GameCube between January 2000 and July 2006 in that country. Combined console sales of the Incredibles series reached 1.5 million units in the United States by July 2006. The PlayStation 2 version also received a "Platinum" sales award from the Entertainment and Leisure Software Publishers Association (ELSPA), indicating sales of at least 300,000 copies in the United Kingdom.

By February 2006, the game sold 6 million copies.

== Sequel ==
Continuing after the events of the game, a sequel titled The Incredibles: Rise of the Underminer was released in 2005. Rise of the Underminer serves as an alternative sequel to the first game and film, featuring Mr. Incredible and Frozone as playable characters, with the option of two-player cooperative play as a new addition. The game revolves around Mr. Incredible and Frozone as they team up together to defeat the Underminer and stop his robot army from taking over the world.
