= Jennifer Frey =

American sportswriter (1968–2016)

- Born: May 23, 1968; St. Louis, Missouri, U.S.
- Died: March 26, 2016 (aged 47); Washington, D.C., U.S.
- Education: Harvard University
- Occupation: Journalist
- Children: 1
- Writing career
- Years active: 1992–2016
- Genre: Sports

Jennifer Marie Frey (May 23, 1968 – March 26, 2016) was an American sportswriter.

== Biography ==
Frey was born in St. Louis and grew up in Allegany, New York, the child of a professor and a schoolteacher. She attended Allegany Central School and as a sophomore began interning for the Olean Times Herald. She went to college at Harvard University.

After college, Frey interned at the Detroit Free Press, then the Miami Herald. She went on to write for the Philadelphia Daily News and The New York Times. When interning in Detroit, she once approached baseball player Jack Morris for a clubhouse interview and he responded by stating: "I don't talk to women when I'm naked unless they're on top of me or I'm on top of them." The remark further attracted criticism when team president Bo Schembechler called it a predictable remark.

In 1995, she joined The Washington Post, writing for the sports page, then the style section. Writing of Frey in 1997, David Carr called her "a certified prodigy who can do it all: X's and O's, empathetic profiles, and hard takedowns when the situation requires it."

A single mother, Frey had one daughter. Frey was diagnosed with bipolar disorder.

Frey died of organ failure due to alcoholism on March 26, 2016, at the age of 47.

== See also ==
- List of people with bipolar disorder
- List of sports writers
