= Rush: A Disney–Pixar Adventure =

2012 video game

Kinect Rush: A Disney–Pixar Adventure
- Original Kinect Rush cover art; the remaster's cover art adds Finding Dory imagery between the Ratatouille and Toy Story portions on the left and Cars, Up and The Incredibles portions on the right.
- Developer: Asobo Studio
- Publisher: Microsoft Studios
- Director: David Dedeine
- Designer: David Dedeine
- Artists: Olivier Ponsonnet; Patrice Bourroncle
- Writer: Chris Roma
- Composers: Tilman Sillescu; Alexander Röder; Benny Oschmann; Jochen Flach; Alex Pfeffer
- Platforms: Xbox 360; Xbox One; Microsoft Windows
- Release: March 20, 2012: Xbox 360; NA: March 20, 2012; JP: March 22, 2012; AU: March 22, 2012; EU: March 23, 2012; Xbox One, Microsoft Windows; WW: October 31, 2017
- Genre: Platform
- Mode: Single-player

Kinect Rush: A Disney–Pixar Adventure, later remastered as Rush: A Disney–Pixar Adventure, is a 2012 platform video game based on Pixar films, released for Kinect on Xbox 360. Announced on March 8, 2012 and released later that month, the game is similar to Kinect: Disneyland Adventures, but players instead are taken through the worlds of eight (later nine) of Pixar's movies: Up, Toy Story, Toy Story 2, Toy Story 3, The Incredibles, Cars, Cars 2, and Ratatouille with the game hub set in a local park.

In August 2017 at Gamescom 2017, Microsoft announced that Rush: A Disney–Pixar Adventure (without the Kinect name) would be remastered and re-released for Xbox One and Microsoft Windows 10. The remaster, which was released on October 31, 2017, supports 4K resolution, high dynamic range visuals, traditional controls alongside Kinect for Xbox One, enhancements for Xbox One X and adds a new world based on the 2016 Pixar film Finding Dory.

== Gameplay ==
In Rush: A Disney–Pixar Adventure, the player begins the game by creating an avatar with the Kinect sensor. The player's avatar changes based on the Pixar film they are playing, such as a car in Cars or a superhero in The Incredibles. The game takes place in the third-person and the levels are an action-adventure take. Most of the gameplay consists of collecting coins, getting a high score, and performing specific tasks.

== Reception ==
Reception

Aggregate score
Aggregator	Score
Metacritic	68/100

Review score
Publication	Score
IGN	6/10

Review aggregator Metacritic gave the game a rating of 68 out of 100, which indicates "mixed or average reviews".

Reviewer Steven Hopper of IGN gave the game a rating of 6 out of 10, saying that the game is "sure to give kids plenty of exercise", but "control issues make for a frustrating experience at best".
