= Guilty: 30 Years of Randy Newman =

Box set by Randy Newman
- Released: November 3, 1998
- Recorded: 1962–1996
- Label: Rhino
- Producer: Gregg Geller (Compilation)

Randy Newman chronology
Randy Newman's Faust (1995)	Guilty: 30 Years of Randy Newman (1998)	Bad Love (1999)

Guilty: 30 Years of Randy Newman is a four-disc box set released in November 1998 that chronicles the first three decades of singer songwriter Randy Newman's musical career. Despite the title, the set actually covers 34 years of Newman's work, with the earliest track on the set being 1962's "Golden Gridiron Boy", and the latest tracks coming from the 1996 soundtrack of James and the Giant Peach.

== Track listing ==
=== Disc One ===
1. "Love Story (You and Me)"
2. "Bet No One Ever Hurt This Bad"
3. "Cowboy"
4. "The Beehive State"
5. "I Think It's Going to Rain Today"
6. "Davy the Fat Boy"
7. "Have You Seen My Baby?"
8. "Let's Burn Down the Cornfield"
9. "Mama Told Me Not to Come"
10. "Suzanne"
11. "Old Kentucky Home"
12. "Sail Away"
13. "Lonely at the Top"
14. "Last Night I Had a Dream"
15. "Political Science"
16. "Burn On"
17. "Memo to My Son"
18. "You Can Leave Your Hat On"
19. "God's Song (That's Why I Love Mankind)"
20. "Rednecks"
21. "Birmingham"
22. "Marie"
23. "Guilty"
24. "Louisiana 1927"
25. "Kingfish"
26. "Baltimore"
27. "Rider in the Rain"

=== Disc Two ===
1. "Short People"
2. "Little Criminals"
3. "In Germany Before the War"
4. "I'll Be Home"
5. "It's Money That I Love"
6. "Ghosts"
7. "The Girls in My Life (Part I)"
8. "William Brown"
9. "I Love L.A."
10. "Mikey's"
11. "My Life Is Good"
12. "Miami"
13. "Real Emotional Girl"
14. "Take Me Back"
15. "Song for the Dead"
16. "Dixie Flyer"
17. "New Orleans Wins the War"
18. "Four Eyes"
19. "It's Money That Matters"
20. "I Want You to Hurt Like I Do"
21. "Can't Keep a Good Man Down"
22. "Bleeding All over the Place" [Alternate Mix]
23. "Happy Ending"

=== Disc Three ===
1. "Golden Gridiron Boy"
2. "Vine Street" [Demo]
3. "Love Is Blind" [Demo]
4. "Don't Ruin Our Happy Home" [Demo]
5. "Goat"
6. "Gone Dead Train"
7. "Tickle Me" [Live]
8. "Maybe I'm Doing It Wrong" [Live]
9. "Yellow Man" [Live]
10. "Magic in the Moonlight" [Live]
11. "Beat Me Baby" [Demo]
12. "Simon Smith and the Amazing Dancing Bear"
13. "Let Me Go"
14. "Jesus in the Summertime" [Demo]
15. "Going Home (1918)" [Demo Version]
16. "Interiors" [Demo]
17. "Pretty Boy"
18. "Something to Sing About" [Demo]
19. "Ballad of the Three Amigos" [Demo Version]
20. "My Little Buttercup" [Demo Version]
21. "Blue Shadows on the Trail" [Demo Version]
22. "Happy" [Demo]
23. "Longest Night" [Demo]
24. "Days of Heaven" [Demo Version]
25. "What Have You Done to Me" [Demo]
26. "Masterman and Baby J" [Demo Version]
27. "Lines in the Sand"
28. "Gainesville" [Demo Version]
29. "Feels Like Home" [Live]
30. "My Name Is James" [Demo Version]
31. "Laugh and Be Happy" [From Cats Don't Dance/Demo]

=== Disc Four ===
1. "Rev Running" [From Cold Turkey]
2. "Change Your Way" [From Ragtime]
3. "Clef Club, No. 1" [From Ragtime]
4. "Clef Club, No. 2" [From Ragtime]
5. "Ragtime" [From Ragtime]
6. "Prologue 1915-1923" [From The Natural]
7. "Natural" [From The Natural]
8. "Introduction/I Love to See You Smile" [From Parenthood]
9. "Kevin's Party (Cowboy Gil)" [From Parenthood]
10. "1914" [From Avalon]
11. "End Title" [From Avalon]
12. "Leonard" [From Awakenings]
13. "Dexter's Tune" [From Awakenings]
14. "Clocks" [From The Paper]
15. "Make up Your Mind" [From The Paper]
16. "Opening" [From Maverick]
17. "Tartine de Merde" [From Maverick]
18. "You've Got a Friend in Me" [From Toy Story]
19. "Woody and Buzz" [From Toy Story]
20. "I Will Go Sailing No More" [From Toy Story]
21. "Heaven Is My Home" [From Michael] Sung by Valerie Carter
22. "James and the Giant Peach Main Title" [From James and the Giant Peach]
23. "Clouds" [From James and the Giant Peach]
24. "Good News" [From James and the Giant Peach]
