= Lonely at the Top: The Best of Randy Newman =

Compilation album by Randy Newman
- Released: 18 May 1987
- Recorded: 1968–1983
- Genre: Rock
- Length: 69:34

Randy Newman chronology
| Trouble in Paradise (1983) | Lonely at the Top: The Best of Randy Newman (1987) | Land of Dreams (1988) |

Lonely at the Top: The Best of Randy Newman is a 1987 compilation album by Randy Newman. It was not issued in the U.S.

In 2000 it was voted number 476 in Colin Larkin's All Time Top 1000 Albums.

== Track listing ==
All tracks written by Randy Newman

=== Original album ===
Side one
| No. | Title | Length |
|---|---|---|
| 1. | "Love Story" |
| 2. | "Livin' Without You" |
| 3. | "I Think It's Going to Rain Today" |
| 4. | "Mama Told Me (Not to Come)" |
| 5. | "Sail Away" |
| 6. | "Simon Smith and the Amazing Dancing Bear" |
| 7. | "Political Science" |
| 8. | "God's Song (That's Why I Love Mankind)" |
| 9. | "Rednecks" |
| 10. | "Birmingham" |

Side two
| No. | Title | Length |
|---|---|---|
| 1. | "Louisiana 1927" |
| 2. | "Marie" |
| 3. | "Baltimore" |
| 4. | "Jolly Coppers on Parade" |
| 5. | "Rider in the Rain" |
| 6. | "Short People" |
| 7. | "I Love L.A." |
| 8. | "Lonely at the Top [Live]" |

=== Reissues ===
Remastered and reissued on CD format in 1998 with four extra tracks ("Old Kentucky Home", "In Germany Before the War", "Christmas in Cape Town" and "My Life Is Good") inserted into the running order. Additionally, the order of "Louisiana 1927" and "Marie" was reversed on the 1998 reissue.

| No. | Title | Length |
|---|---|---|
| 1. | "Love Story (You and Me)" |
| 2. | "Livin' Without You" |
| 3. | "I Think It's Going to Rain Today" |
| 4. | "Mama Told Me (Not to Come)" |
| 5. | "Old Kentucky Home" |
| 6. | "Sail Away" |
| 7. | "Simon Smith and the Amazing Dancing Bear" |
| 8. | "Political Science" |
| 9. | "God's Song (That's Why I Love Mankind)" |
| 10. | "Rednecks" |
| 11. | "Birmingham" |
| 12. | "Marie" |
| 13. | "Louisiana 1927" |
| 14. | "Baltimore" |
| 15. | "Jolly Coppers on Parade" |
| 16. | "Rider in the Rain" |
| 17. | "In Germany Before the War" |
| 18. | "Short People" |
| 19. | "Christmas in Cape Town" |
| 20. | "My Life Is Good" |
| 21. | "I Love L.A." |
| 22. | "Lonely at the Top [Live]" |
