= Satirical music =

Music genre

Satirical music describes music that employs satire or was described as such. It deals with themes of social, political, religious, cultural structures and provides commentary or criticism on them typically under the guise of dark humor or respective music genres. Topics include sexuality, race, culture, religion, politics, institutions, taboo subjects, morality, and the human condition.

== History ==
Satirical route in music has been explored countless times; from premodern ballads such as the 4th-century BCE Song of Songs (Note: The Shephard Hypothesis posits that "true love" of the unknown girl for the unnamed shepherd is greater that it resisted the emperor of lands, Solomon.) to classical, avant-garde, and modern popular music. Such examples are:

Classical
Satirical ballets, operas, ballads, and plays include Le Bourgeois gentilhomme (1670), Il Girello (1682) by Alessandro Melani, L'Europe galante (1697), Poly (1729), Le carnaval des revues (1860) by Jacques Offenbach, La belle Hélène (1864), Ariadne auf Naxos (1912), third movement of Lieder eines fahrenden Gesellen (1897), Die Dreigroschenoper (1928), Neues vom Tage (1929), L'amour des trois oranges (1921), The Rake's Progress (1951), 17th-century composer Molière, and 20th-century composer György Ligeti.

Satire in contemporary music

Other topics
- In popular music; Hip hop; comedy rock; punk rock; extreme metal; vaporwave

Popular
American folk singer Bob Dylan, (1961–) soul musician Gil Scott-Heron (1969–2011), humorist and rock musician Frank Zappa (1955–1993), surreal funk musicians George Clinton (1955–) and Parliament Funkadelic, hardcore punk band Dead Kennedys (1978–) grindcore band Anal Cunt (1988–2011), and punk rock band The Kominas (2004–).
Avant-garde
Musicians that combined satire and avant-garde include Throbbing Gristle (1975–), Negativland (1979–), Culturcide (1980–), and the so-called Americana absurdum movement comprising monks (1964–1967), The Residents (1969–) especially their albums The Residents Present the Third Reich and Roll (1976) and Commercial Album (1980), DEVO (1973–), and Talking Heads (1975–1991). Another example is a digital hardcore album Alec Empire vs. Elvis Presley (1998).

== Satire in counterculture ==
Counterculture and avant-garde music scenes characterized by being "aggressive in sound, challenging in content" that spawned popular music such as hip hop and heavy metal display satirical taboo transgressions.

According to British sociologist Keith Kahn-Harris, "tongue-in-cheek attitude" and irony has been a fundamental "part of the UK extreme scene" by often adopting camp and comic elements to transgress what outsiders to the scene find "acceptable;" e.g. appropriating Holocaust imagery to advance a position pertaining to abortion or animal rights. Other times, like in the case of black metal, exaggerating tropes and behaviors within music cultures or society. In hip-hop culture, especially gangsta rap and 1990s rappers like Missy Elliott, transgressive humor of rap "revolve[s] around the established movements of gangsta realism and progressive Afrocentrism" to the point of exaggerated albeit critical self-deprecation.

Vaporwave, an Internet music genre, samples corporate video work, old advertising jingles, and music of the so-called economic boom period of the 1980s like smooth jazz or contemporary R&B, and distorts them to produce a sort of repetitious slowed-down, pitch-shifted, intentionally low-fi music that was praised as a commentary on "corporate cultures of capitalism" or consumerism for its ambivalent satirical musical tone. One of vaporwave albums utilizing satire is James Ferraro's album FARSIDEVIRTUAL (2011).

== Satire in popular music ==
Ambiguity of satire has contributed to popular misinterpretations of music that adopted it. For instance, Bruce Springsteen's "Born in the U.S.A." (1984) listed in Rolling Stone's "The 500 Greatest Songs of All Time" and RIAA's Songs of the Century was written as a satire yet canonized as a "patriotic rock anthem," a designation that ignores the message "how far political leaders had strayed from the values the country was founded on," criticizing the establishment with the memorable chorus. As Springsteen adds, it is about the working-class man going through

[A] spiritual crisis, in which man is left lost. It's like he has nothing left to tie him into society anymore. He's isolated from the government. Isolated from his job. Isolated from his family ... to the point where nothing makes sense.

== Popular satires ==
=== Parody ===
Parody music in the truest sense is a type of work that seriously imitates a well-known original and simultaneously covertly satirizes the environment of which that original is a part (compare, pastiche which does not perform the latter and is conflated with "homages") while at worst is copying an original composition for a "parodic effect" only.

=== Comedic satire ===
Overtly comedic strains of satire include comedy and novelty music, typically focused on broad-appeal jokes and caricatures. Both arriving with popular music in the 1940s and 1950s, comical spoofs of music genres and performers contributed to a popular mainstream strain of satire.

Stan Freberg's satirical contribution was "Green Chri$tma$" (1959) which targeted and offended advertisers but he was not against advertising and personally created an effective Coca-Cola campaign himself. Popular satirical comedian Weird Al Yankovic contributed with "Frank's 2000 TV" (1992)—song about a love/hate relationship with pop culture and technology and "Young, Dumb & Ugly" (1993)—song about snotty outlaw posturing. California punk band The Offspring expressed a humorous satire style in "Come Out and Play" (1994)—song about teenage gang violence and "Pretty Fly (For a White Guy)" (1998)—song about 1990s poor youth posturing adopted by an upper-class young suburbanite.

On the other hand, Tom Lehrer is known for his style of comic morbid juxtapositions and satirical culture criticisms, e.g. "Poisoning Pigeons in the Park" pairs inoffensive melody with Charles Addams-esque lyrics:

We'll murder them all, amid laughter and merriment
Except for the few we take home to experiment

Meanwhile, "My Home Town" catalogues prostitution, pornography, murder, arson among common people using a nostalgic tone. Lehrer's humorous music with social and political satire overtones attracted censorship and negative press which he reprinted on the sleeve of his albums. By word-of-mouth reputation he sold 370,000 copies by the end of the 1950s and developed a following in Australia, Denmark, and England. Lehrer contributed with "The Folk Song Army," "National Brotherhood Week," "I Wanna Go Back to Dixie," "So Long, Mom (I'm Off to Drop the Bomb)," and "We Will All Go Together When We Go" which examine society and the failings of both left- and right-wing.

Randy Newman, an Americana-themed humorist, fused old time-style music with sardonic off-color lyrics and has contributed to satire with 12 Songs (1970), Sail Away (1972), and Good Old Boys (1974). Newman's song "Rednecks" (1974), banned in Boston, Massachusetts and its airplay restricted for containing the word 'nigger', starts as a stereotypical depiction of "racist rednecks" from the South and ends up illustrating less overt racism in the Northern United States:

Now your northern nigger's a Negro
You see he's got his dignity
Down here we're too ignorant to realize
That the North has set the nigger free
Yes he's free to be put in a cage
In Harlem in New York City
And he's free to be put in a cage in the South-Side of Chicago
And the West-Side
And he's free to be put in a cage in Hough in Cleveland
And he's free to be put in a cage in East St. Louis
And he's free to be put in a cage in Fillmore in San Francisco
And he's free to be put in a cage in Roxbury in Boston
They're gatherin' 'em up from miles around
Keepin' the niggers down"
