= The Randy Newman Songbook Vol. 1 =

Studio album by Randy Newman
- Released: September 30, 2003
- Recorded: January–February 2003
- Studio: Conway, Hollywood, California
- Genre: Singer-songwriter
- Label: Nonesuch
- Producer: Mitchell Froom

Randy Newman chronology
Bad Love (1999)	The Randy Newman Songbook Vol. 1 (2003)	Harps and Angels (2008)

Professional ratings
Review scores
Source	Rating
AllMusic	4/5 stars

The Randy Newman Songbook Vol. 1 is the eleventh studio and first songbook album by American musician Randy Newman and contains newly recorded, stripped-down versions of some of his best-known songs, performed by him singing and playing the piano without accompaniment.

The album spans a 33-year period, from early songs like "I Think It's Going to Rain Today" and "Living Without You" to "The World Isn't Fair" from his Bad Love album (1999). Also included are three instrumental extracts from his film scores.

== Details ==
Re-recording older songs forced Newman to reassess his previous work. "I was surprised at the consistency. Whether good or bad, there were no real jumps in quality or drop-offs that I could tell when I listened to it. There were no real bad surprises. A lot of things I would have done differently, in terms of tempo or arrangement."

Newman said the album was different to his other work. "It's sort of an ugly Norah Jones record. You can put it on and eat potato chips and drink Pepsi to it, unlike my other records," he said.

== Track listing ==
All tracks composed and arranged by Randy Newman

1. "Lonely at the Top" (actually a medley of the uncredited "Dexter's Tune", an instrumental from Awakenings and "Lonely at the Top") – 3:13
2. "God's Song (That's Why I Love Mankind)" – 3:23
3. "Louisiana 1927" – 2:56
4. "Let Me Go" – 2:37
5. "Rednecks" – 3:05
6. "Avalon" (Instrumental) – 0:58
7. "Living Without You" – 2:16
8. "I Think It's Going to Rain Today" – 2:57
9. "You Can Leave Your Hat On" – 2:32
10. "It's Money That I Love" – 2:16
11. "Marie" – 2:56
12. "When She Loved Me" (Instrumental) – 1:03
13. "Sail Away" – 2:58
14. "The World Isn't Fair" – 3:07
15. "Political Science" – 2:02
16. "The Great Nations of Europe" – 3:24
17. "In Germany Before The War" – 3:49
18. "Ragtime" (Instrumental) – 1:25

== Personnel ==
Randy Newman – vocals, piano

== Lyric changes ==
A line in "It's Money That I Love" was changed from "it'll get you a half-pound [230 g] of cocaine and a 16-year-old girl" to "it'll get you a half-pound of cocaine and a 19-year-old girl" (in the USA, the age of consent varies between 16 and 18 on a state-by-state basis).
