= Baltimore (Randy Newman song) =

1977 song by Randy Newman

Single by Randy Newman

from the album Little Criminals
- B-side: "You Can't Fool the Fat Man"
- Released: 1978
- Recorded: 1977
- Genre: Rock
- Length: 3:35
- Label: Warner Bros.
- Songwriter: Randy Newman
- Producers: Lenny Waronker, Russ Titelman

Randy Newman singles chronology
"Short People" (1977)	"Baltimore" (1978)	"Rider in the Rain" (1977)

"Baltimore" is a song written by Randy Newman that was first released on his 1977 album Little Criminals as well as a single. It has been covered by several artists, including Nina Simone, Nils Lofgren and the Tamlins.

== Lyrics and music ==
The singer of "Baltimore" is a man who lives in Baltimore but faced with the problems of the city resolves to leave and never return. Asbury Park Press critic Gar Joseph described the song as a social commentary song about a "desperate ghetto youth's longing for escape from a dying city." The lyrics provide images of the city of Baltimore from the 1970s such as prostitutes and drunkards and other signs of hopelessness in a city that seems to be dying. The song starts with the image of a "beat up little seagull" on marble stairs trying to find the ocean. Newman said that this line always bothered him, saying that it's "a little long but it's obviously setting a scene." The images in the song were inspired by a National Geographic article, as Newman had never actually been to Baltimore other than passing through by train when the song was written.

AllMusic critic Matthew Greenwald described "Baltimore" as a "fabulous, downcast, and heavy ballad." According to Greenwald, the music is driven by "a soulful series of riffs and chord changes that accurately mirror the subject matter." Financial Times writer David Cheal noted that the song takes a long time before reaching the refrain of "Oh, Baltimore Man, it's hard just to live". Cheal describes the music as being based on a circling piano motif, which builds tension until the tension is relieved when the drums come in at the refrain.

== Reception ==
Greenwald praised Newman's version as "one of Randy Newman's most underrated songs" and praised the image of the lonely seagull as "striking" and a good representation of a depressed city losing its battle with nature. John Milward of the Chicago Daily News Service called the song a "classic". Milward particularly praised Newman's vocal performance of the beautiful and "bittersweet melody" of the refrain, which Milward interpreted as an acknowledgement by the protagonist that "the siren call of the dying city can't be escaped", even as he is driving away. Kansas City Star writer Robert W. Butler claimed that it featured "one of the most compelling unions of melody, arrangement and lyrics" that he had heard. Joseph called it "poignant" and "urgent". Lexington Herald-Leader staff writer Pam Parrish called it "a good candidate for the thinking man's song of the year." Evening Sun writer Patrick Ercolano described it as "a less-than-cheery look at urban America." Newman biographer Kevin Courrier criticized Newman's version of "Baltimore" for lacking "the detailed precision of a comparable social commentary piece like 'Louisiana 1927'". He also felt that Newman did not "commit himself emotionally".

The song was included on several of Newman's compilation albums, including Lonely at the Top: The Best of Randy Newman in 1987, Guilty: 30 Years of Randy Newman in 1998 and The Randy Newman Songbook Vol. 2 in 2011.

== Controversy ==
The song was criticized in the city of Baltimore due to the negative depiction of the city. Baltimore Comptroller Hyman A. Pressman wrote a poem criticizing Newman for being "all wet" by downgrading the city, especially when "he hasn't seen our neighborhoods". When Newman later played in the city, he received letters both praising him and denouncing him. Newman later stated that "I couldn't legitimately defend my extensive knowledge of the town. The song just came out." He also said "A lot of my songs are about places I sort of never been to or don't know well. They have a kind of romance to me, just the names of them, American names." He further noted that the song is not meant to specifically criticize Baltimore but rather is a general lament about urban decay.

== Cover versions ==
"Baltimore"

Single by Nina Simone

from the album Baltimore
- B-side: "Forget"
- Released: 1978
- Recorded: 1978
- Genre: R&B; reggae
- Length: 4:37
- Label: CTI
- Songwriter: Randy Newman
- Producer: Creed Taylor

Nina Simone singles chronology
"My Sweet Lord" (1973)	"Baltimore" (1978)	"The Family" (1979)

Nina Simone covered "Baltimore" in 1978 as the title track of her album Baltimore and as a single. Simone treats it a reggae song. Financial Times writer David Cheal notes that Simone's version "smoothes out the contrasts between verse and chorus" relative to Newman's version but nonetheless manages to generate a sense of unease. Simone biographer Alex Coles noted that in the verses Simone's delivery "emphasizes the harshness of the images" but in the refrain she "conveys a succinct sense of empathy."

Classic Rock History critic Rena Sherwood rated Simone's version of "Baltimore" to be the 7th best cover of a Randy Newman song, praising the "funky twist" and "reggae beat".. She stated that "While Newman sounded at the breaking point, Simone sounds merely world-weary and somehow wiser than the chaos all around her." Allmusic critic Joseph McCombs also praised Simone's version. Philadelphia Daily News critic Rich Aregood called the song "excellent" and said that Simone's performance "makes you feel every depressing inch of that city." Buffalo News critic Ceaser Williams called Simone's version "hypnotically tender and tough, subtle and searing." Coles stated that "the subtly of Simone’s performance demonstrates how a protest song and a love song need not be mutually exclusive." Courrier felt that Simone effectively addressed Newman's apparent lack of commitment by treating the song as a dirge.

Nils Lofgren released a six minute version of "Baltimore" on his 1979 album Nils. Allmusic critic Joe Viglione praised the drumming on this version and said that "It's is fun to hear Newman's work put in this setting." Daily Illini critic Alan Mandel praised the vocal performance and guitar and organ playing and called this version "properly emotional". Courier News critic Karen Hammerdorfer called this version "haunting". Courrier described it as having "gritty passion" that is missing from Newman's version. On the other hand, Asbury Park Press critic Robert Santelli called Lofgren's version "somewhat overdone and excessive".

The Tamlins released a version of the song in 1979. This is also a reggae version song, and according to Cheal generates an even greater mood of despair than Simone's version and "brings an almost biblical quality to the song." Allmusic critic Jo-Ann Greene said the Tamlins' version had a "funky feel, enhanced by the sharp brass, but with a distinctive island sound, then cut through with a clubby atmosphere and a militant, rootsy aura." Courrier felt that the Tamlins' version addressed his criticism of Newman's version by discarding Newman's "lackluster arrangement" and making the song sound like "a band of explorers attempting to bring the city back to life."
