= Red, White and Maddox =

Musical based on the life of Lester Maddox

- Cover of the production's Broadway Playbill
- Music: Don Tucker
- Lyrics: Don Tucker
- Book: Don Tucker; Jay Broad
- Productions: 1968 Atlanta; 1969 Broadway

Red, White and Maddox is a satirical musical revue with music and lyrics by Don Tucker and book by Tucker and Jay Broad. The play debuted in Atlanta in October 1968 and later had a 41-performance run on Broadway from January 26 to March 1, 1969. The play was conceived by Broad, who at the time was the director of the Theatre Atlanta theatrical company. Modeled as a fictional biography of Georgia Governor Lester Maddox, the play is split into two acts. The first act chronicles Maddox's foray into politics as a firebrand segregationist, culminating in him becoming governor of the state. The second act, set in the future, details Maddox becoming president of the United States.

The play was controversial upon its debut in Atlanta and may have contributed to Theatre Atlanta being evicted from their theater. After this, company management entered into discussions with producer Edward Padula, who helped move the production to the Cort Theatre on Broadway. The play received mixed reviews from New York critics, who contended that the subject matter was of local importance and not of enough notability to merit a Broadway production. However, Clive Barnes of The New York Times praised Jay Garner's performance of Maddox, and Richard Watts Jr. of the New York Post expressed enjoyment with the soundtrack. Due to the play's short run on Broadway, a planned album was cancelled, though several singles were recorded. In February 1970, a television adaptation was aired on WNEW-TV.

== Plot ==
The play is a fictional biography on Maddox, chronicling his political career. The action is divided into two acts, with the first titled "One Hundred Years Later" and the second titled "One Hundred Years Too Late". Act One details Maddox's business career and initial forays into politics as a segregationist, culminating in his governorship of Georgia. Act Two is a fantasy set in a future where Maddox has become president of the United States. The play concludes with Maddox initiating a nuclear holocaust that destroys the world.

== Characters and cast members ==
The principal cast members for the Broadway production of Red, White and Maddox, who were all credited as "The Kids".

- Georgia Allen as Alberta
- Fran Brill as Student Leader
- Lois Broad as Cynical Campaigner
- Ronald Bush as The Senator
- Fred Chappell as Air Force General
- Mitchell Edmonds as Governor of Indiana
- Karl Emery as Standard Bearer
- Clarence Felder as Interlocutor
- Gary Gage as General of the Armies
- William Gammon as Radio Commentator
- Elaine Harris as Student Delegate
- Ted Harris as Buttercup Boy
- Christopher Lloyd as Bombardier
- Bettye Malone as Rock Singer
- Ted Martin as Boy from the New Left
- Sandy McCallum as The Redneck
- Muriel Moore as Virginia Maddox
- Arlene Nadel as Girl from the New Left
- Steve Renfroe as Political Commentator
- Judy Schoen as Little Mary Sue
- Susan Shaloub as Protestor
- William Trotman as C.I.A. Chief
- James Weston as Rock Singer
- Jay Garner as Lester Maddox

The principal production team for the Broadway production of Red, White and Maddox.

- Direction – Jay Broad and Don Tucker
- Producer - Edward Padula
- Associate Producers – William Domnitz and Arthur Miller
- Scenery and Costumes – David Chapman
- Lighting and Design Supervision – Richard Casler
- Visual Materials – Bill Diehl Jr.
- Musical Direction – Uncredited

For the Atlanta production, costumes were designed by both David Chapman and David Charles, while additional lyrics were provided by Ronald Axe.

== Background ==
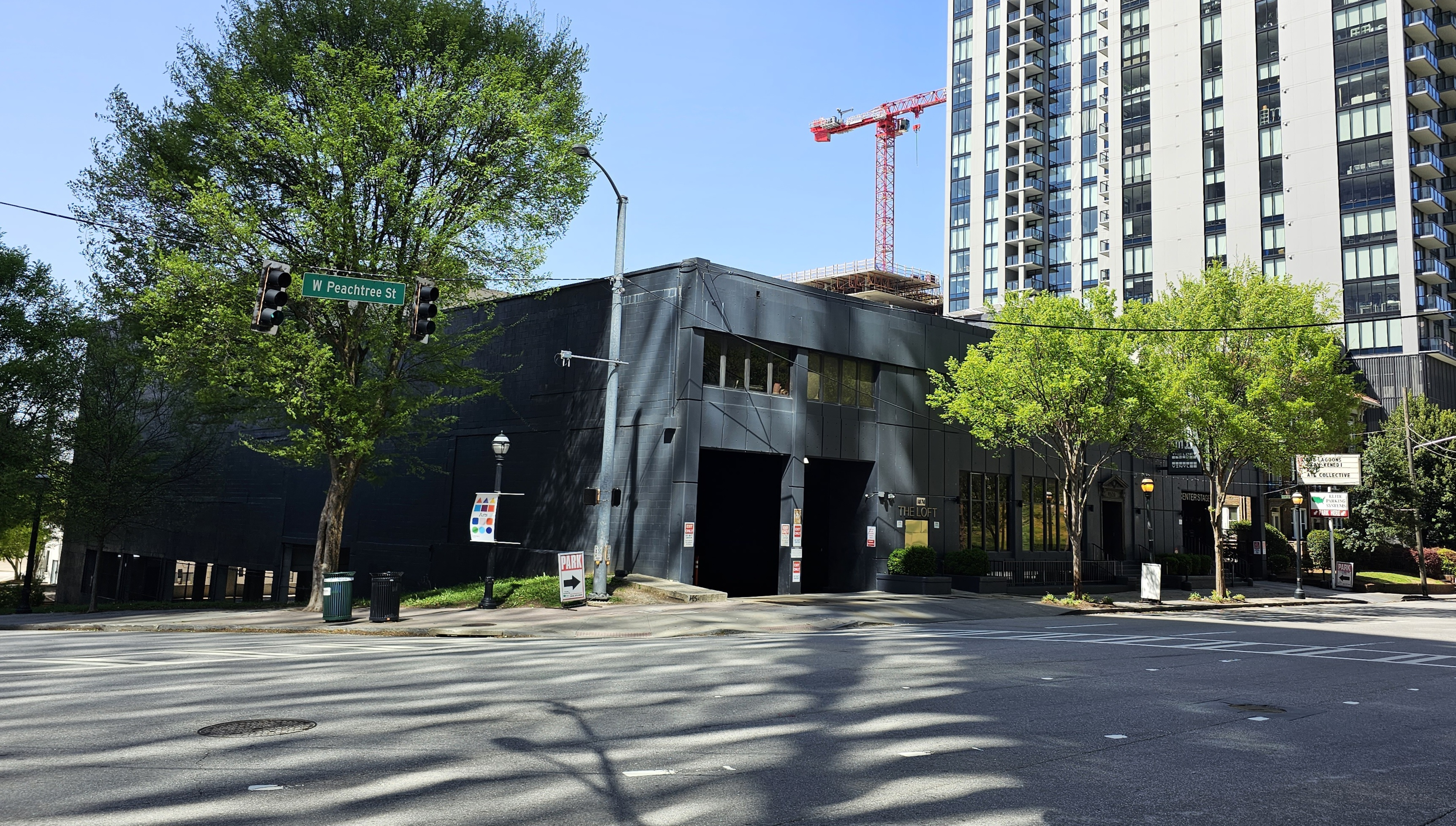
The original venue in Atlanta (pictured 2023), now known as Center Stage

Theatre Atlanta was a theatrical company established in 1957 through the merger of two other companies. In 1965, the company hired Jay Broad as a stage director, having previously worked with other companies and receiving notability for directing an off-Broadway adaptation of Life Is a Dream. As director, Broad began to shift the company from a primarily community theatre operation to a more professional one, hiring a team of a dozen actors consisting of both local amateurs and professionals from cities such as New York City who were members of the Actors' Equity Association. Around the same time, a new venue was being constructed for the company by Frania Lee, daughter of businessman H. L. Hunt, who intended the theater to be a memorial for her daughter, who had died along with many of Atlanta's art society in a recent plane crash. The theater opened with a production of The Royal Hunt of the Sun in 1966. During his early years as director, Broad developed a reputation for politically controversial plays, such as a production of MacBird! and a production of Caesar and Cleopatra wherein Cleopatra was played by African American actress Diana Sands. Through the 1967–68 season, the company performed before over 85,000 spectators.

For the 1968–69 season, after failing to develop another original production, Broad decided to create a satirical revue based on the life of Lester Maddox, the governor of Georgia. Maddox was well-known for his racist and conservative policies, and in the summer of 1968, he was running for president in that year's election. The play, subtitled "A Thing with Music", was developed by Broad and Don Tucker, with the two modeling their script after real sayings and quotes from Maddox, which were referred to as "Lesterisms". According to historian Joseph Wesley Zeigler, the play was an adaptation of The Riddle of Lester Maddox, a biography of Maddox by Bruce Galphin, a columnist for The Atlanta Constitution.

== Production history ==
=== Atlanta ===
The play debuted in Atlanta in October 1968, beginning a three-month run. While a commercial success, the production was the source of controversy and conflict between the company and Lee, who owned the theater. Lee, who was sympathetic to right-wing politics, found the play offensive, and one day after its debut, she issued an eviction notice to the company. After a series of legal disputes, the company was officially evicted on January 4, 1969. While the evictions may have been due in part to political issues, rent arrears were also noted as a contributing issue, with Broad later stating, "In all fairness to her ... we were not too prompt in our rent payments". After the eviction, the company began to seek relocation to a Broadway theatre. The company's management sent letters containing good reviews of the play to 40 Broadway managers and producers. Producer Edward Padula responded and helped relocate the production.

=== Broadway ===
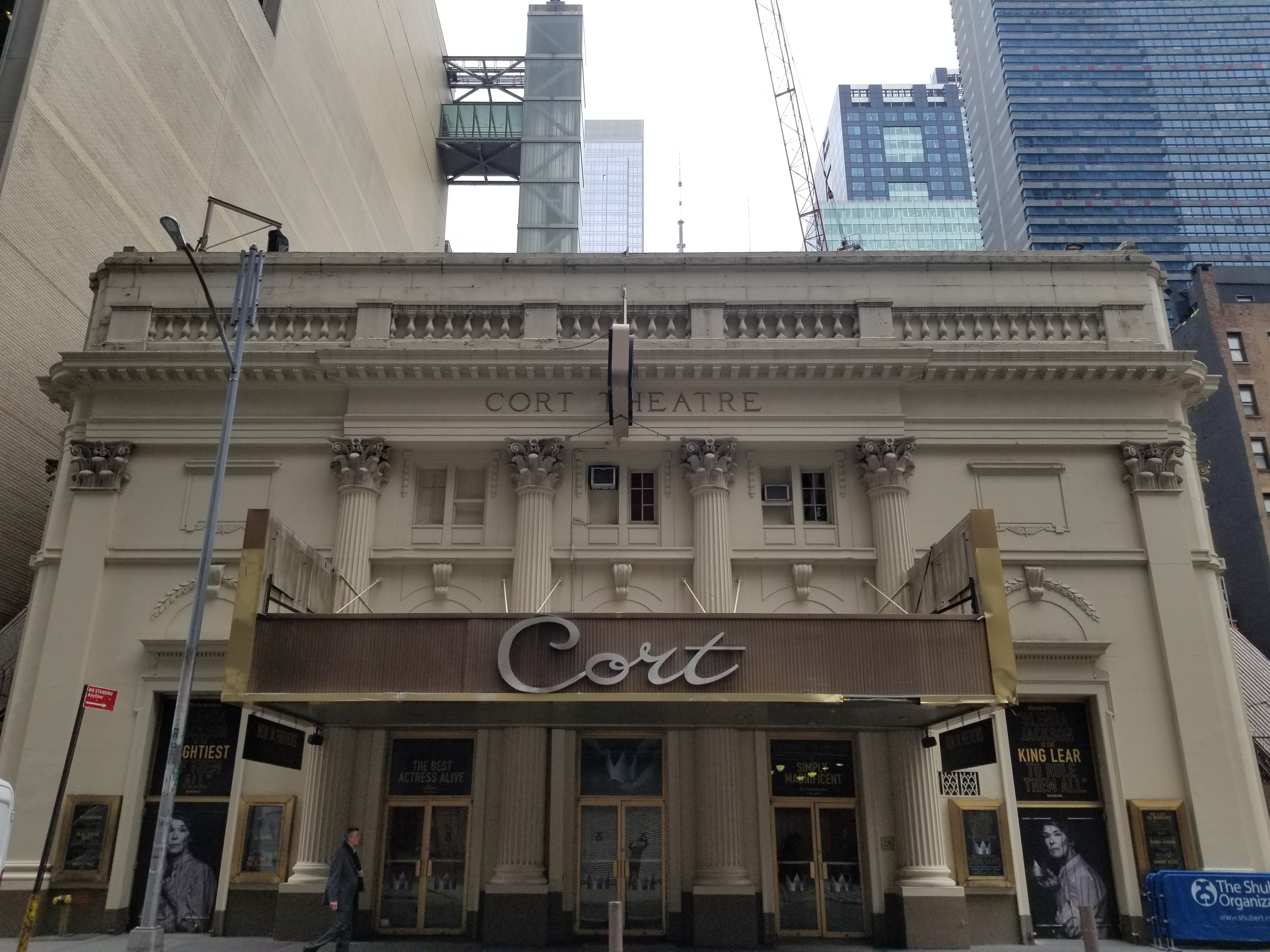
The production had a 41-performance run at the Cort Theatre (pictured 2019) in New York City.

The play debuted on Broadway at the Cort Theatre on January 26, 1969, (Note: Some sources state that the play made its Broadway debut in February, with one source giving an exact date of February 9. However, several sources state that the production debuted on January 26, including the Playbill published for the play.) as the last play to debut that month. According to theatre historian Steven Suskin, the play was one of several politically and socially boundary-pushing plays to have a Broadway run after the debut of Hair in 1968. The play ran for 41 performances at the venue, ending its run on March 1.

== Musical numbers ==
=== Act One ===
- "What America Means to Me" – Company
- "Givers and Getters" – Company
- "Jubilee Joe" – Company
- "Ballad of a Redneck" – Men
- "First Campaign Song" – Salvation Army Band, Company
- "Hoe Down" – Company
- "Phooey" – Jay Garner
- "Second Campaign Song" – Salvation Army Band, Company
- "God Is an American" – Company

=== Act Two ===
- "Hip-Hooray for Washington" – Jay Garner
- "City Life" – Company
- "Song of the Malcontents" – Company
- "The General's Song" – Company
- "Little Mary Sue" – Company
- "Billie Joe Ju" – Company
- "The Impeachment Waltz" – Company
- "Red, White and Maddox Kazoo March" – Company

An album was scheduled to be recorded by Metromedia Records, though it was cancelled due to the short run that the play had on Broadway. However, singles were recorded by Capitol Records, Columbia Records, and Metromedia of "Jubilee Joe".

== Critical reception ==
The play received mixed reviews from critics, with many noting that the local appeal that the play had had in Atlanta was absent from its Broadway run. Theatre historian Gerald Bordman later stated that the play was better received in Atlanta, where it was more politically relevant, than in New York City, a sentiment echoed by historian and critic Steven Suskin. John Simon, in a review for New York, stated that, although the play had some funny and memorable moments, it was overall "bland", further saying of Maddox, "... this is hardly a fit subject for full-scale satire. In Atlanta, where the show originated, perhaps ..." Richard Watts Jr. of the New York Post criticized the amateur nature of the play, but found the soundtrack enjoyable, singling out "Jubilee Joe" in particular. Clive Barnes of The New York Times also gave the play a mixed review, criticizing its local appeal, but he singled out Garner's lead performance, calling the actor a "joy" who was "fantastically funny" and "tellingly accurate".

== Television adaptation ==
In February 1970, an edited version of the play was aired by WNEW-TV in New York. Critic Jack Gould of The New York Times called the broadcast "only limitedly amusing", giving additional criticism to the edits made for television and saying that "on TV its bite was never particularly hard and its pace was seldom varied".

== Sources ==
- Allen, Frederick (1996). Atlanta Rising: The Invention of an International City 1946-1996. Marietta, Georgia: Longstreet Press. ISBN 978-1-4616-6167-2.
- Bordman, Gerald (2001). American Musical Theater: A Chronicle (3rd ed.). Oxford: Oxford University Press. ISBN 978-0-19-977117-2.
- Davis, Michael (2008). Street Gang: The Complete History of Sesame Street. New York City: Viking Press. ISBN 978-0-670-01996-0.
- Dietz, Dan (2014). The Complete Book of 1960s Broadway Musicals. Lanham, Maryland: Rowman & Littlefield. ISBN 978-1-4422-3072-9.
- Gould, Jack (February 13, 1970). "TV: 'Red, White and Maddox' on Air". The New York Times. p. 75. ISSN 0362-4331. Archived from the original on January 6, 2023.
- Guernsey, Otis L. Jr. (1987). Curtain Times: The New York Theater, 1965-1987 (First Applause ed.). New York City: Applause Theatre Book Publishers. ISBN 978-0-936839-24-0.
- "Broadway Play Is a Spoof of Georgia's Governor Maddox". Jet. XXXV (21). Johnson Publishing Company: 58–59. February 27, 1969. ISSN 0021-5996. OCLC 1781708.
- Jones, Kenneth (January 24, 2011). "Jay Garner, Comic Actor Who Played Politicians in Musicals 1776, La Cage and Whorehouse, Dies at 82". Playbill. Archived from the original on January 30, 2011.
- Little, Stuart W. (January 20, 1969). "Onstage 1969". New York. 2 (3): 57–61.
- "Red, White and Maddox". Playbill. January 26, 1969. Archived from the original on June 13, 2020.
- Schanke, Robert A. (2011). Queer Theatre and the Legacy of Cal Yeomans. New York City: Palgrave Macmillan. ISBN 978-0-230-11988-8.
- Short, Bob (1999). Everything is Pickrick: The Life of Lester Maddox. Macon, Georgia: Mercer University Press. ISBN 978-0-86554-662-2.
- Simon, John (February 17, 1969). "Red, White...and Bland". New York. 2 (7): 50.
- Suskin, Steven (2002). Broadway Yearbook, 2000-2001. Oxford: Oxford University Press. ISBN 978-0-19-515637-9.
- Willis, John (1994). Theatre World: 1991-1992 Season. Vol. 48. New York City: Applause Theatre Book Publishers. ISBN 978-1-55783-142-2.
- Zeigler, Joseph Wesley (1973). Regional Theatre: The Revolutionary Stage. Minneapolis: University of Minnesota Press. ISBN 978-1-4529-1142-7.
