= Georgia Allen =

American actress (1919–2014)

- Allen around 1997
- Born: Georgia Williams Allen; May 12, 1919; Beaumont, Texas, United States
- Died: January 11, 2014 (aged 94); Atlanta, Georgia, United States
- Education: University of California, Santa Barbara
- Occupation: Actress
- Years active: 1949–2006
- Spouse: Thaddius S. Allen (1942–2009; his death)

Georgia Williams Allen (May 12, 1919 – January 11, 2014) was an American actress. She was active from 1949 to 2006, beginning in local theater before progressing to both television and movie roles.

== Early life ==
Allen was born in Beaumont, Texas. She later moved, via Cleveland, Ohio, to Atlanta, Georgia, where she became an educator in the public school system.

== Acting career ==
Allen was a repertory player with Atlanta University Summer Theater for thirty years (1949 to 1979). In that time, Allen appeared in a political satire musical called Red, White and Maddox about Atlanta's Governor Lester Maddox. The show premiered in Atlanta and followed with a short run on Broadway.

Her first screen role was as the mother of Clifton Davis' character, Gus, in Together for Days (1972). After a five-year break, she returned in 1977 as Mrs. Jones in Greased Lightning. She appeared in four television movies between 1979 and 1982, then several more from the mid-1980s onward. Between 1990 and 1994, she appeared as three different characters in the television series In the Heat of the Night. In 1997, she played Lucille Wright, the real-life cateress of the parties hosted by Kevin Spacey's character, Jim Williams, in Midnight in the Garden of Good and Evil. Wright died in 2025, aged 105.

=== Awards ===
Allen was awarded the Bronze Jubilee Award by WETV in 1979; the Ray McIver Award by the Just Us Theater in 1993; and the Legacy Award by Jomandi Productions, also in 1993.

Her last-known appearance was as Ruby in Madea's Family Reunion (2006).

== Personal life ==
Allen was educated at Clark College in Atlanta, graduating in 1942. That same year, she married Thaddius S. Allen, with whom she had a daughter and a son during their 67-year marriage.

She earned her master's degree at the University of California, Santa Barbara.

== Death ==
Allen died on January 11, 2014, having survived her husband by five years. She is interred in Atlanta's Crest Lawn Cemetery.
