= Etta James (1973 album) =

Studio album by Etta James
- Released: 1973
- Recorded: Sunset Sound Factory, Hollywood
- Genre: Funk, soul, R&B
- Label: Chess; CH-50042
- Producer: Gabriel Mekler

Etta James chronology
Losers Weepers (1971)	Etta James (1973)	Come a Little Closer (1974)

Professional ratings
Review scores
Source	Rating
AllMusic	3.5/5 stars
Christgau's Record Guide	B

Etta James (also known as Only a Fool) is the tenth studio album by American blues artist Etta James, released in 1973.

== Reception ==
The Allmusic review awarded the album 3½ stars stating "A mixture of funk and blues-rock, the new direction turned out dark and brooding... The reinvented James went over well with the public. The album garnered good sales and was even nominated for an Grammy Award".

The album reached peak positions of number 154 on the US Billboard 200 and number 41 on the Billboard R&B chart.

== Track listing ==
No.	Title	Writer(s)	Length
1.	"All the Way Down"	Catherine C. Williamson, Trevor Lawrence, Gabriel Mekler	5:34
2.	"God's Song (That's Why I Love Mankind)"	Randy Newman	3:36
3.	"Only a Fool"	Trevor Lawrence, Gabriel Mekler, Etta James	2:38
4.	"Down So Low"	Tracy Nelson	3:38
5.	"Leave Your Hat On"	Randy Newman	3:22
6.	"Sail Away"	Randy Newman	3:57
7.	"Yesterday's Music"	David Clayton-Thomas, William "Smitty" Smith	4:15
8.	"Lay Back Daddy"	Catherine C. Williamson, Trevor Lawrence, Gabriel Mekler	2:40
9.	"Just One More Day"	Otis Redding, Steve Cropper, McElvoy Robinson	3:20

== Personnel ==
- Etta James - vocals
- Ken Marco - guitar
- Chuck Rainey - bass guitar
- William "Smitty" Smith - keyboards
- Kenny "Spider Webb" Rice - drums
- King Errisson - percussion, congas
- Trevor Lawrence - horn arrangements
- Jimmie Haskell - string arrangements
