= Baltimore (album) =

Studio album by Nina Simone
- Released: January 1978
- Recorded: January 1978
- Studios: Studio Katy, Brussels
- Genres: R&B; jazz; pop; reggae
- Length: 36:49
- Label: CTI/Epic/CBS
- Producer: Creed Taylor

Nina Simone chronology
The Great Show Live in Paris (1974)	Baltimore (1978)	Fodder on My Wings (1982)

Baltimore is the fourteenth studio album by American singer-songwriter and pianist Nina Simone, released in January 1978 by CTI Records. Due to a lack of promotion, and Simone's dissatisfaction with the record, it became a commercial failure, failed to chart, and also received mixed reviews from critics. Baltimore would also become her first and only album released under her contract with CTI Records. The title track was originally written and recorded by Randy Newman in 1977.

== History ==
Nina Simone (born Eunice Kathleen Waymon) was signed to CTI Records after the veteran jazz producer Creed Taylor saw her perform live in 1977 at Drury Lane, and together they would record "Baltimore," Simone's first album since 1974's It Is Finished.

However, sessions for the album were very tense: Simone disagreed with Taylor's production choices—particularly his interest in a reggae sound, which first caused Simone to ask "What is this corny stuff?" Simone's dissatisfaction delayed production, but she would eventually record her vocals for the album in a single hour-long sitting. Simone would later recall of the historic barn where Baltimore was recorded "a basement in Belgium where I was forced to sing songs in order to get out of there."

Simone would later say of the album, "The material was not my personal choice, and I had no say whatsoever in the selection of songs. It was all done before I could make any decisions," leaving it unclear whether Simone—who had notably insisted on creative control in her contracts with previous labels—is referring to the final selection of tracks included on the album or the entire selection of songs ever recorded for it. While Simone may not have had full control over the song selection, she had previously chosen to perform several of the album's songs live, including "Music for Lovers" as early as 1966 (suggesting that she had some say in the songs recorded for Baltimore, as it is unlikely that Taylor would have chosen this song on his own.)

Several of the songs on Baltimore were performed for Simone during the concert Taylor attended before signing her to record Baltimore, including "Balm in Gilead," "Rich Girl," "Everything Must Change," and "That's All I Want from You." Additionally, Simone would rerecord "If You Pray Right," retitled "Heaven Belongs to You," on her album Fodder on My Wings and performed "If You Pray Right" and "Baltimore" for her live 1987 album Let It Be Me.

The album failed to do well commercially, although it received substantial press attention. Critical reception for Baltimore was mixed.

The title track was released as a single in the UK, US, and Australia in 1978, and "The Family" was released as a single in the US in 1979.

In early 2025, Miss Simone's brother, Dr. Samuel Waymon, released "Baltimore" (In Four Movements), in Mill Spring, North Carolina.

In the "official video" that accompanied release of his arrangement, Dr. Waymon examined the history and significance of Newman's composition and explained his rationale in selecting it. The production includes additional imagery highlighting societal conflicts in Baltimore, Maryland (USA) and similar communities throughout the world.

== Critical reception ==
Professional ratings
Review scores
Source	Rating
All About Jazz	positive
AllMusic	2.5/5 stars
Christgau's Record Guide	B−
Rolling Stone	favorable

The New York Times noted Simone's "deep, mannish voice and her aloofness."

== Track listing ==
Side 1
No.	Title	Writer(s)	Length
1.	"Baltimore"	Randy Newman	4:37
2.	"Everything Must Change"	Benard Ighner	3:57
3.	"The Family"	John Hurley, Ronnie Wilkins	4:57
4.	"My Father"	Judy Collins	4:54

Side 2
No.	Title	Writer(s)	Length
1.	"Music for Lovers"	Bart Howard	3:40
2.	"Rich Girl"	Daryl Hall	3:11
3.	"That's All I Want from You"	Fritz Rotter	2:53
4.	"Forget"	Ralph Colucci, David Matthews	2:54
5.	"Balm in Gilead"	Traditional	2:24
6.	"If You Pray Right"	Traditional	3:17

== Personnel ==
=== Musicians ===
- Nina Simone – vocals, piano
- Eric Gale – guitar
- Gary King – bass
- Chuck Israels, Homer Mensch, John Beal - double bass
- Jimmy Madison – drums
- Nicky Marrero – percussion
- Al Schackman – musical director, piano on "Baltimore"
- Jerry Friedman – guitar on "The Family" and "Rich Girl"
- Will Lee – bass on "Rich Girl"
- Andy Newmark – drums on "Rich Girl"
- David Matthews – string arrangements, piano on "The Family" and "Forget"
- String section:

- Barry Finclair, Charles Libove, David Nadien, Harry Glickman, Harry Lookofsky, Herbert Sorkin, Marvin Morgenstern, Max Ellen, Richard Sortomme – violin
- Alfred Brown, Emanuel Vardi, LaMar Alsop – viola
- Alan Shulman, Charles McCracken, Jonathan Abramowitz – cello

- Albertine Robinson, Babi Floyd, Deborah McDuffie, Frank Floyd, Jo Armstead, Maeretha Stewart, Milt Grayson, Ray Simpson – backing vocals

=== Production ===
- Creed Taylor – producer, liner notes
- David Palmer – engineer
- White Gate – album photography
- Sib Chalawick – album design
