= Our New Orleans: A Benefit Album for the Gulf Coast =

Compilation album by Various artists
- Released: December 6, 2005
- Recorded: September, October, 2005
- Genre: Soul, R & B, Jazz
- Label: Nonesuch Records
- Producer: Robert Hurwitz, David Bither

Professional ratings
Review scores
Source	Rating
Entertainment Weekly	B+ 18 November 2005

Our New Orleans: A Benefit Album for the Gulf Coast is an album which presents songs recorded in September and October 2005, shortly after the failure of misdesigned levees flooded New Orleans in the wake of Hurricane Katrina (see: Effect of Hurricane Katrina on New Orleans) With the destruction of their hometown fresh in their minds, New Orleans artists set about making music that directly acknowledges the city.

Funds from the sale of the record was donated to Habitat For Humanity to aid those affected by the Hurricane Katrina disaster.

== Track listing ==
1. "Yes We Can Can" – Allen Toussaint
2. "World I Never Made" – Dr. John
3. "Back Water Blues" – Irma Thomas
4. "Gather By The River" – Davell Crawford
5. "Cryin' In The Streets" – Buckwheat Zydeco
6. "Canal Street Blues" – Dr. Michael White
7. "Medley" – The Wild Magnolias
8. "When The Saints Go Marching In" – Eddie Bo
9. "My Feet Can't Fail Me Now" – Dirty Dozen Brass Band
10. "Tou' Les Jours C'est Pas La Meme" – Carol Fran
11. "L'ouragon" – BeauSoleil
12. "Do You Know What It Means To Miss New Orleans" – Preservation Hall Jazz Band
13. "Prayer For New Orleans" – Charlie Miller
14. "What a Wonderful World" – Wardell Quezergue Orchestra – (featuring Donald Harrison)
15. "Tipitina And Me" – Allen Toussaint
16. "Louisiana 1927" – Randy Newman, Louisiana Philharmonic Orchestra
