= Sail Away (Randy Newman album) =

Studio album by Randy Newman
- Released: May 23, 1972
- Recorded: 1971–1972
- Studios: Amigo, Western, and Poppi (Los Angeles)
- Genre: Orchestral pop
- Length: 30:07
- Label: Reprise
- Producers: Lenny Waronker, Russ Titelman

Randy Newman chronology
| Randy Newman Live (1971) | Sail Away (1972) | Good Old Boys (1974) |

Sail Away is the third studio album by American musician Randy Newman, released on May 23, 1972. It was produced by Lenny Waronker and Russ Titelman and issued on Reprise Records. While all of its songs were written and composed by Newman, several had already been recorded by other artists.

== Composition ==
As with all of Newman's early albums, several of its songs had been previously recorded by other artists. In this case, "Simon Smith and the Amazing Dancing Bear" had been a UK hit for Alan Price in 1967 and was recorded by Harry Nilsson on his 1969 album Harry. "Dayton, Ohio - 1903" had been recorded by Billy J. Kramer as a single in 1969, while Newman and Nilsson recorded a version together for Nilsson's 1970 album Nilsson Sings Newman, and then years later Newman alone (with altered lyrics) for a Nutrasweet television commercial. Newman himself had also previously recorded "Last Night I Had a Dream" as a single, issued in September 1968. The version heard on Sail Away is a re-recording with a notably different arrangement.

"You Can Leave Your Hat On" was later recorded by Joe Cocker in 1986 and this version was featured on the soundtrack of the 1986 film 9½ Weeks starring Kim Basinger. A version by Tom Jones appeared on the soundtrack of the 1997 film The Full Monty.

"He Gives Us All His Love" was also initially written and recorded by Newman in a sparser and slower arrangement for the 1971 film Cold Turkey. The film issued no soundtrack album, and the first commercially available recordings of this song were issued by Sundance (March 1971) and Ed Ames (October 1971).

The song "Lonely at the Top" was written specifically with Frank Sinatra in mind, although he never recorded it. Newman himself had already released it (in a solo live performance) on his previous album, Randy Newman Live (1971).

== Reissue ==
The album was reissued by Rhino Records on May 5, 2002, with several previously unreleased bonus tracks.

== Legacy ==
Professional ratings
Review scores
| Source | Rating |
|---|---|
| AllMusic | 5/5 stars |
| The Encyclopedia of Popular Music | 5/5 stars |
| Christgau's Record Guide | A− |
| Rolling Stone | (favorable) |

In 2000 Sail Away was voted number 582 in Colin Larkin's All Time Top 1000 Albums. That same year, it was ranked number 268 on Rolling Stone's list of the 500 Greatest Albums of All Time. The album was also included in the book 1001 Albums You Must Hear Before You Die.

Brian Wilson has said that this album profoundly affected him at the time of its release, briefly keeping him from sliding further into depression and mental illness. In particular, Wilson noted that he listened to Sail Away "over and over" while physically writing down the lyrics which would become the Beach Boys' Mount Vernon and Fairway fairy tale EP. In 2021, Wilson ranked Sail Away third on his list of "5 Albums I Can't Live Without" for Spin.

"Burn On" plays over the opening titles of the 1989 movie Major League. According to the film's director, David S. Ward, he chose the song because it was the only one he knew of that was about Cleveland, Ohio, which is where the movie takes place. The chorus of the song, "burn on, big river, burn on," refers to when the Cuyahoga River caught fire due to pollution in 1969.

The song "Old Man" plays during the closing credits of Noah Baumbach's 2017 film The Meyerowitz Stories.

== Track listing ==
All tracks are written by Randy Newman.

Side one
| No. | Title | Length |
|---|---|---|
| 1. | "Sail Away" | 2:56 |
| 2. | "Lonely at the Top" | 2:32 |
| 3. | "He Gives Us All His Love (from Cold Turkey (1971 Film))" | 1:53 |
| 4. | "Last Night I Had a Dream" | 3:01 |
| 5. | "Simon Smith and the Amazing Dancing Bear" | 2:00 |
| 6. | "Old Man" | 2:42 |

Side two
| No. | Title | Length |
|---|---|---|
| 1. | "Political Science" | 2:00 |
| 2. | "Burn On" | 2:33 |
| 3. | "Memo to My Son" | 1:56 |
| 4. | "Dayton, Ohio – 1903" | 1:47 |
| 5. | "You Can Leave Your Hat On" | 3:18 |
| 6. | "God's Song (That's Why I Love Mankind)" | 3:36 |

CD bonus tracks
| No. | Title | Length |
|---|---|---|
| 13. | "Let It Shine" | 1:40 |
| 14. | "Maybe I'm Doing It Wrong" (studio version) | 1:21 |
| 15. | "Dayton, Ohio - 1903" (early version) | 1:53 |
| 16. | "You Can Leave Your Hat On" (demo version) | 2:45 |
| 17. | "Sail Away" (early version) | 3:18 |

== Charts ==
| Chart (1972) | Position |
|---|---|
| United States (Billboard 200) | 163 |
| Australia (Kent Music Report) | 42 |

== Personnel ==
- Randy Newman – piano, vocals
- Ry Cooder – slide guitar on "Last Night I Had a Dream" and "You Can Leave Your Hat On"
- Russ Titelman – guitar
- Jim Keltner, Earl Palmer, Gene Parsons – drums
- Jimmy Bond, Chris Ethridge, Wilton Felder – bass guitar
- Milt Holland – percussion
- Louis Kaufman – concertmaster
- Abe Most – alto saxophone on "Lonely at the Top"

Technical

- Lenny Waronker – co-producer
- Russ Titelman – co-producer
- Randy Newman – arranger
- Emil Newman – conductor on "Sail Away" and "Burn On"
- Larry Marks – conductor on "Old Man"
- Lee Herschberg – engineer, mixing
- Bruce Botnick – engineer
- Bob Kovach – engineer
- Donn Landee – engineer
- Harold "Lanky" Linstrot – engineer
- Judy Maizel – production assistant
- Trudy Portch – production assistant
- Mike Salisbury – graphics, photography
