= There Is a Balm in Gilead =

Traditional African American spiritual

Song
- Written: 19th century
- Genre: Spiritual

"There Is a Balm in Gilead" is a traditional African American spiritual dating back to at least the 19th century. Its refrain appears in Washington Glass's 1854 hymn "The Sinner's Cure", although the hymn is substantially based on an earlier work by John Newton.

The "balm in Gilead" references the Old Testament, particularly Jeremiah 8:22, but the spiritual's lyrics focus on the New Testament concept of salvation through Jesus Christ. In the Old Testament, the balm of Gilead is a healing compound, symbolizing spiritual medicine for Israel and sinners.

The 1973 edition of the Primitive Baptist songbook Harp of Ages features "Balm in Gilead" with verses from a Charles Wesley hymn. The second verse of the spiritual also appears in versions of another spiritual, "(Walk That) Lonesome Valley", illustrating the common practice of shared verses in camp meetings and revivals. Nina Simone recorded a rendition of the song on her 1978 studio album Baltimore.

== History ==
The "balm in Gilead" is a reference from the Old Testament, but the lyrics of this spiritual refer to the New Testament concept of salvation through Jesus Christ. The Balm of Gilead is interpreted as a spiritual medicine that is able to heal Israel (and sinners in general). In the Old Testament, the balm of Gilead is taken most directly from Jeremiah chapter 8 v. 22: "Is there no balm in Gilead? Is there no physician there? Why then is there no healing for the wounds of my [God's] people?" (Another allusion can also be found in Jeremiah chapter 46, v. 2 and 11: "This is the message (of the Lord) against the army of Pharaoh Neco … Go up to Gilead and get balm, O Virgin Daughter of Egypt, but you multiply remedies in vain; here is no healing for you" – see also Jeremiah chapter 22, v. 6.)

The first appearance of the spiritual in something close to its current form is uncertain. A version of the refrain can be found in Washington Glass's 1854 hymn "The Sinner's Cure", (see link below) where it is in 7s.6s.7s.6s rather than the Common Meter of today's refrain. Glass attributed this hymn to himself, but like several of the hymns so attributed, it is substantially the work of another. He attached to one of John Newton's Olney hymns of 1779 this refrain:

There is balm in Gilead,
To make the wounded whole;
There's power enough in heaven,
To cure a sin-sick soul.

There is no mention of the balm of Gilead in Newton's poem, but it begins:

How lost was my condition
Till Jesus made me whole!
There is but one Physician
Can cure a sin–sick soul.

The similarities in the refrain make it likely that it was written for Newton's verse.

The 1973 edition of the 1925 7-shape Primitive Baptist songbook Harp of Ages has an unattributed song "Balm in Gilead" with a similar chorus, but verses drawn from a Charles Wesley hymn, "Father I Stretch My Hands to Thee".

The second verse quoted below ("If you can't...") is also found in some versions of another well-known spiritual "(Walk That) Lonesome Valley". "Wandering verses", as they are often called, are quite common in the camp meeting and revival context, and were already found in by 1800 in the African-American community, as shown by Richard Allen's 1801 A Collection of Hymns and Spiritual Songs Selected from Various Authors.

A version of the song was recorded by the singer Nina Simone on her album Baltimore.

== Traditional lyrics ==
Chorus:

There is a balm in Gilead
To make the wounded whole;
There is a balm in Gilead
To heal the sin-sick soul.

Some times I feel discouraged,
And think my work’s in vain,
But then the Holy Spirit
Revives my soul again.

(Chorus)

If you cannot sing like angels,
If you can’t preach like Paul,
You can tell the love of Jesus,
And say He died for all.

(Chorus)

== Alternative lyrics ==
Chorus:

There is a balm in Gilead,
To make the wounded whole;
There is a balm in Gilead,
To heal the sin-sick soul.

Sometimes I feel discouraged,
And think my work’s in vain,
But then the Holy Spirit
Revives my soul again.

(Chorus)

If you cannot preach like Peter,
If you cannot pray like Paul,
You can tell the love of Jesus,
And say He died for all.

(Chorus)

Don't ever feel discouraged,
'Cause Jesus is your friend,
And if you lack for knowledge,
He'll not refuse to lend.

== Recordings ==
Recordings include:

- Paul Robeson on his 1945 album Spirituals
- George Beverly Shea on his 1957 album A Billy Graham Crusade in Song
- Rahsaan Roland Kirk on his 1972 album I, Eye, Aye: Live at the Montreux Jazz Festival, 1972
- Nina Simone on her 1978 album Baltimore
- Jessye Norman on her 1979 album Negro Spirituals
- Nana Mouskouri on her 1990 album Oh Happy Day
- Sweet Honey in the Rock on its 1995 album Sacred Ground
- Karen Clark Sheard on her 1997 debut album Finally Karen
- Toshi Reagon on the 1998 television soundtrack Africans in America
- Larry Willis on his 2003 album Sanctuary
- Leon Bibb and Eric Bibb on their 2004 album A Family Affair
- "Balm of Gilead", a song by the Sunday Service Choir on its 2019 album Jesus Is Born
- Jeanne Lee on Archie Shepp's 1969 album Blasé
- Charles Lloyd on his 2000 album The Water Is Wide
