= He Gives Us All His Love =

Song by Randy Newman

from the album Sail Away
- Released: 1972
- Genre: Gospel, satire
- Length: 1:52
- Label: Reprise Records
- Songwriter: Randy Newman
- Producers: Lenny Waronker and Russ Titelman

"He Gives Us All His Love" is a song written and performed by Randy Newman. It first appeared in the 1971 film Cold Turkey, for which it served as a sort of theme song and played during the opening and closing credits. Newman re-recorded the song for his album Sail Away the following year.

The ballad is both brief (running 1:52 in its Sail Away version) and very sparsely arranged. It opens with the delicate sounds of a string section and is maintained by Newman's piano in a slow "four to the bar" tempo.

The song is gospel-influenced and shares both musical and thematic similarities with such American hymns as Jesus Loves Me. It does not, however, discuss Christian themes of redemption but merely gives a testament of faith ("He's smiling down on us from up above / And he's givin' us all his love").

The tone of the song is bittersweet; the succinct lyrics include the assertion that the divine witnesses human suffering ("he hears the babies crying / he sees the old folks dying") and include the implication that being seen, and loved, might comfort. More explicitly, the narrator tells the listener "...you can lean on him." As Newman himself is an atheist and regularly included satire in his compositions, the song can be interpreted through that lens as a sarcastic critique of religion, as it portrays a god who witnesses human suffering but merely "gives us all his love" while doing nothing tangible to intervene.

The song has sometimes been taken at face value, however, and has been covered by Wanda Jackson and Sherie Rene Scott, both born-again Christians.

It has also been covered by Roy Ayers, Birtles & Goble, Ross D. Wyllie and others. Some versions are extended to four minutes or more in length and few, if any, are as brief as Newman's original rendition.

== Re-release ==
In the belated 2007 CD issue of the Cold Turkey soundtrack (which was Newman's first film work, and had never been issued in any format to that time), the two original versions of this song as featured in the film were included (2:35" and 2:03"). In the first version as played over the film's opening credits, the song segues into a choral gospel number called "I Love the Lord"; this portion is omitted from the soundtrack.

== See also ==
- Dystheism
- Misotheism
