= God's Song (That's Why I Love Mankind) =

1972 song by Randy Newman

Song by Randy Newman

from the album Sail Away
- Released: 1972
- Genre: Rock
- Length: 3:36
- Label: Reprise
- Songwriter: Randy Newman
- Producers: Lenny Waronker; Russ Titelman

"God's Song (That's Why I Love Mankind)" or simply "God's Song" is a song written by Randy Newman that was first released on Newman's 1972 album Sail Away.

== Music and lyrics ==
Allmusic critic Matthew Greenwald described "God's Song (That's Why I Love Mankind)" as a New Orleans-style blues that's "built around some simple but highly effective ragtime and blues piano riffs and chord changes". Music professor James E. Perone said that it incorporates elements of the blues and black spiritual traditions. Newman biographer Kevin Courrier noted elements of gospel music.

The lyrics contain much black humor. Music critic Robert Hilburn described the lyrics as "humorous" but with "thought-provoking touches" that could be considered as making fun of some people's faith. Perone commented on the song's sarcasm and nihilism. The song begins with Seth asking God why people must die after Cain kills Abel. It includes a dialogue between religious leaders and God. Christian, Jewish, Buddhist and Hindu religious leaders ask God over satellite TV to let them be if He won't take care of them. God announces that "man means nothing" - less than even cactus plants and yucca trees. He also announces that he laughs at peoples' prayers and thinks people are crazy for having faith in Him after he burns down people's cities and kills their children.

Hilburn summed up the theme of the song as "a kind God overlooking a world in turmoil". Michael Butters of the Daily News pointed out that while on the surface it may appear that Newman is making fun of God, he is actually making fun of man's view of God. Post Crescent critic Bonnie Wagner explained that according to Newman, the reason that God loves mankind is that people are dumb enough to worship him despite all the trouble He dispenses. Courrier suggested that even though God loves mankind because even though people are fool, they are His fools. Music journalist Steve Turner went further, stating that in the song Newman adopts the voice of a deity that thinks it's funny that people worship and adore him despite all the calamities he inflicts on them. Although Turner stated that the song suggests belief in a malicious, he also stated that this is not Newman's actual position; rather, Newman makes the suggestion in order to "expose what he sees as the fallacy" of religions such as Judaism and Christianity. Courrier saw connections between the themes of this song and those of the Kurt Weill's and Bertolt Brecht's 1928 song "What Keeps Mankind Alive?" and with "The Grand Inquisitor" story told by Ivan Karamazov within Fyodor Dostoevsky's 1880 novel The Brothers Karamazov.

Newman stated that the song was not intended to mock religion or insult religious believers. Rather, Newman stated that "I view him like a view the ether. He's just not there. I'm not going to actively go out there and say 'Stop following false idols,' but I don't believe he's there. Flying saucers – God – I don't believe in them."

== Reception ==
Hilburn called "God's Song (That's Why I Love Mankind)" a "premiere moment" of Sail Away. Greenwald praised its "masterful" construction. Allmusic critic Mark Deming called it "one of the most bitter rants against religion that anyone committed to vinyl prior to the punk era." Winston-Salem Journal critic Jim Shertzer called it a "major triumph" and an "arresting and troubling piece of writing" that's "strikingly delivered" and a tune that will generate discomfort for the listener. Anchorage Daily News critic Al Rudis said that "If you are religious and easily offended, 'God's Song' is not for you." Anderson Daily Bulletin critic Michael Main called it a "masterpiece".

"God's Song (That's Why I Love Mankind)" has been released on several of Newman's compilation albums, including Lonely at the Top: The Best of Randy Newman, Guilty: 30 Years of Randy Newman and The Randy Newman Songbook Vol. 1.

== Cover versions ==
Etta James covered "God's Song (That's Why I Love Mankind)" on her 1973 album Etta James. Newman considered this one of his favorite covers of any of his songs. Newman said "It took some courage because the song is pretty rough for the community she comes from. And her version really takes God on more than mine does. I didn't hit him hard at all." Allmusic critic Quint Kik called it a "hair-raisingly sarcastic interpretation." The Record critic Allen Macaulay said that James' version is "sufficiently sardonic to suggest sacrilege."

Tracy Nelson covered the song in 1978 on Homemade Songs. Mathilde Santing covered it in 1993 on Mathilde Santing Sings Randy Newman (Texas Girl & Pretty Boy).
