= Fodder on My Wings =

Studio album by Nina Simone
- Released: 1982
- Recorded: January 1982
- Studio: Studio Davout, Paris
- Genre: Vocal; African; world; soul; worldbeat
- Length: 36:22
- Label: Carrere
- Producer: Yves Chamberlan, Giancarlo Cerri

Nina Simone chronology
Baltimore (1978)	Fodder on My Wings (1982)	Nina's Back (1985)

Professional ratings
Review scores
Source	Rating
AllMusic	3.5/5 stars
Tom Hull	B+
Pitchfork	8.3/10

Fodder on My Wings is an album by singer/pianist/songwriter Nina Simone. It is part of her later works, and can be regarded alongside Baltimore (1978) as one of her better achievements of that period. It is however a rather obscure album and not widely distributed. The album is one of Simone's most introspective and personal works, with songs about her father's death and her (not always pleasant) stay in Liberia, Trinidad, and Switzerland. There is some confusion about the actual title of the album and the song with almost the same title on the album, being called "Fodder on My Wings", "Fodder in My Wings", "Fodder in Her Wings" interchangeably. In 2015, the album was reissued on CD in the US by Sunnyside. In April 2020 the album was reissued on vinyl, CD and digital format with an alternative track-listing and new album artwork.

John Lewis of Uncut writes: "Simone's last decent studio LP sees her tentatively entering '80s worldbeat territory".

== Composition ==
A worldbeat album, Fodder on My Wings features an array of styles that reflect the "cultural dislocation" of Simone's time living in Liberia, Trinidad, Switzerland and Barbados. According to critic John Lewis, "there are Afro-Cuban horn blasts, African drums and intense Caribbean rhythms, along with some very 1980s-sounding flirtations with digital synths and slap bass." He adds that "There Is No Balm in Gilead", an old hymn which Simone previously sung on Baltimore (1978), is re-recorded in French as "a slow, dubby waltz", while "I Was Just a Stupid Dog to Them" is a "funky, minor-key calypso" song.

== Song information ==
"Le peuple en Suisse", on this track Simone talks about the people in Switzerland, where she lived for several years. This was not a happy time for her, and Simone found the people in Switzerland very empty and unloving.

== Cover art ==
The album cover shows a painting made by Gabriel Jarnier.

== Track listing ==
All songs written by Nina Simone except where noted.

Original LP

1. "I Sing Just to Know That I'm Alive" – 2:23
2. "Fodder in Her Wings" – 5:34
3. "Vous êtes seul, mais je désire être avec vous" – 5:30
4. "Il y a un baume à Gilead" – 2:21
5. "Heaven Belongs to You (Le ciel t'appartiendra)" – 3:38
6. "Liberian Calypso" – 2:59
7. "Thandewye" – 5:31
8. "I Was Just a Stupid Dog to Them" – 2:25
9. "Color Is a Beautiful Thing" – 1:03
10. "There Is No Returning (Le peuple en Suisse)" – 4:58

Additional CD tracks

11. "Alone Again (Naturally)" (Gilbert O'Sullivan, Simone) – 6:27
12. "Stop" – 2:19
13. "They Took My Hand" – 0:34

The bonus tracks were first released on the digital reissue of the album in 1988 on the French CY Records label. The CD's track order varies from the original LP.

2020 Reissue

In April 2020, the album was reissued on vinyl, CD, and digital format by Verve/UMe/Universal with an alternative track listing and new album artwork.

1. "I Sing Just to Know That I'm Alive" – 2:23
2. "Fodder in Her Wings" – 5:35
3. "Vous êtes seul, mais je désire être avec vous" – 4:30
4. "Il y a un baume à Gilead" – 2:21
5. "Liberian Calypso" – 2:59
6. "Alone Again (Naturally)" - 6:27
7. "I Was Just a Stupid Dog to Them" – 2:25
8. "Color is a Beautiful Thing" – 1:03
9. "Le peuple en Suisse" – 4:58
10. "Heaven Belongs to You" - 3:38
11. "Thandewye" – 5:31
12. "Stop" - 2:19
13. "They Took My Hand" – 0:34

== Personnel ==
- Nina Simone – vocals, piano, tambourine, harmony vocals, arrangements, conductor
- Sylvin Marc – bass, vocals
- Paco Sery – percussion
- Sydney Thaim – congas, bells, wood block

== Charts ==
Chart performance for Fodder on My Wings
Chart (2020)	Peak position
Austrian Albums (Ö3 Austria)	57
Portuguese Albums (AFP)	29
US Jazz Albums	22
