= Edward Padula =

Edward Padula (January 24, 1916 – November 1, 2001) was an American theatre producer, stage manager, and occasional director and writer.

Born in Newark, New Jersey, Padula began his theatrical career by directing the book for the early Lerner and Loewe collaboration The Day Before Spring in 1945. A full decade passed before he returned to Broadway as a stage manager, working on such productions as No Time for Sergeants (1955), Rumple (1957), God and Kate Murphy, and Saratoga (1959).

In 1958, Padula began to audition songwriting teams for a musical about American teenagers he hoped to produce. Lee Adams and Charles Strouse won the job on the third tryout, and Padula linked them with book writer Michael Stewart. Bye Bye Birdie (1960) not only proved to be the producer's most successful project, but also won him the Tony Award for Best Musical. Following All American (1962) and Bajour (1964), producer Padula donned the hats of book writer and director as well for the ill-fated A Joyful Noise (1966), which closed after four previews and twelve performances. Its major distinction was the introduction of choreographer Michael Bennett to the theatrical community.

Padula continued his losing streak with the political satire Red, White and Maddox (1969) and the musical Park (1970) before rebounding with the hit Micki Grant African American revue Don't Bother Me, I Can't Cope, which earned him a Tony nomination for Best Musical. It was his last Broadway production.

Padula died of a heart attack in Bridgehampton, New York, aged 84. The tony is currently at the house of his niece.
