= Bad Love (album) =

Studio album by Randy Newman
- Released: June 1, 1999
- Recorded: 1997–1999
- Studios: Sunset Sound; Sound Factory; Capitol (Hollywood)
- Genre: Rock
- Length: 44:45
- Label: DreamWorks
- Producers: Mitchell Froom, Tchad Blake

Randy Newman chronology
| Guilty: 30 Years of Randy Newman (1998) | Bad Love (1999) | The Randy Newman Songbook Vol. 1 (2003) |

Bad Love is the tenth studio album by American singer-songwriter Randy Newman, released on June 1, 1999. It was Newman's first solo album since 1995's Randy Newman's Faust and followed a 3-year hiatus during which Newman had focused on film soundtracks, receiving several Academy Award nominations.

== Background ==
The album finds Newman bitter and satirical – as "biting as ever, yet unafraid to tackle personal and heartfelt concerns". Newman tackles issues such as the state of American culture in "My Country", which chronicles suburbia's growing dependence on television, and "The World Isn’t Fair", which takes a look at the world through the eyes of Karl Marx. Another subject is aging – "Shame" takes a negative look at an "older man courting a younger woman" via the barbed lyrics and an exchange between the lead vocalist and the backing singer. "I’m Dead (But I Don't Know It)" is more self-referential in dealing with aging rock stars and commenting: "Everything I write sounds the same / Each record that I’m making / Is like a record that I’ve made / Just not as good".

"Every Time It Rains" was composed for Michael Jackson but he declined to record it, while "I Miss You" was composed for Newman's ex-wife.

Newman later said, "Before I started Bad Love, I wasn't exactly sure I could do a rock 'n' roll record at 65, or however old I was. But I was satisfied that it was a good record. Maybe my best record."

This album was Newman's only release for DreamWorks Records.

== Critical reception ==
Professional ratings
Review scores
| Source | Rating |
|---|---|
| AllMusic | 3.5/5 stars |
| The Austin Chronicle | 5/5 stars |
| Chicago Sun-Times | 3.5/4 stars |
| Entertainment Weekly | B+ |
| Hot Press | 10/12 |
| Rolling Stone | 3.5/5 stars |
| The Village Voice | A |

It received generally positive reviews from critics, placing 11th in the 1999 Pazz & Jop Critics Poll.

AllMusic stated that the songs on Bad Love "should rest comfortably alongside his other four-star offerings."

== Track listing ==
All songs written by Randy Newman.

1. "My Country" – 5:40
2. "Shame" – 4:54
3. "I'm Dead (But I Don't Know It)" – 3:25
4. "Every Time It Rains" – 3:33
5. "The Great Nations of Europe" – 3:26
6. "The One You Love" – 3:39
7. "The World Isn't Fair" – 2:44
8. "Big Hat, No Cattle" – 4:24
9. "Better Off Dead" – 4:03
10. "I Miss You" – 3:55
11. "Going Home" – 2:06
12. "I Want Everyone to Like Me" – 2:59

== Personnel ==
- Randy Newman – vocals, piano, arranger, conductor
- Steve Donnelly – guitar
- Greg Leisz – pedal steel guitar
- Brandon Fields – saxophone
- Martin Krystall – saxophone
- Jack Nimitz – saxophone
- Brian Scanlon – saxophone
- Tom Scott – saxophone
- Stu Blumberg – trumpet
- Oscar Brashear – trumpet
- Bruce Fowler – trombone
- George Thatcher – trombone
- James Self – tuba
- Mitchell Froom – keyboards
- Greg Cohen – bass
- Pete Thomas – drums
- Carmen Carter, Donna Davidson, Linda Harmon, Scottie Haskell, Luana Jackman, Teresa James, Melissa Mackay, Kate Markowitz, Bobbi Page, Sally Stevens-Eskew, Carmen Twillie, Terry Wood, Herb Pedersen – background vocals
