= Little Criminals =

Studio album by Randy Newman
- Released: September 23, 1977
- Recorded: July–September 1977
- Studios: Warner Bros. Recording Studios (North Hollywood); The Burbank Studios (Burbank)
- Genre: Rock
- Length: 38:21
- Labels: Warner Bros.; Reprise
- Producers: Lenny Waronker; Russ Titelman

Randy Newman chronology
Good Old Boys (1974)	Little Criminals (1977)	Born Again (1979)

Little Criminals is the fifth studio album by American singer-songwriter Randy Newman. Like most of Newman's work, the album eschews traditional pop-music themes ("I'll Be Home" is the only love song on the album) in favor of musical story-telling, often featuring quirky characters and cynical views. The first song on the album – "Short People" – became a hit single in its own right. The album itself peaked at #9 on the US Billboard 200 chart, Newman's highest-charting album to date.

Some of the instrumental work and backing vocals on the album are performed by members of the Eagles. In particular, Glenn Frey played guitar on two tracks, Joe Walsh played guitar on three tracks, and Don Henley and Tim Schmit sang background vocals on one track each. Frey and JD Souther, who had earlier been the duo Longbranch Pennywhistle, sang background vocals on three tracks.

Newman wrote, conducted and played keyboards on all tracks. Synthesizers were programmed by Michael Boddicker.

In September 1977 the British music magazine NME published the following interview with Newman talking sardonically about his then new release: "There's one song about a child murderer," Newman deadpans. "That's fairly optimistic. Maybe. There's one called 'Jolly Coppers on Parade' which isn't an absolutely anti-police song. Maybe it's even a fascist song. I didn't notice at the time. There's also one about me as a cowboy called 'Rider in the Rain'. I think it's ridiculous. The Eagles are on there. That's what's good about it. There's also this song 'Short People'. It's purely a joke. I like other ones on the album better but the audiences go for that one."

"Baltimore" was covered by Nina Simone, Nils Lofgren, the Tamlins, David Gray, Billy Mackenzie, Lianne La Havas, Jazmine Sullivan, Mink Stole, and Dr. Samuel Waymon.

"In Germany Before the War" was covered by British band Diesel Park West on their covers album "God Only Knows" in 1992, and by Marianne Faithfull on her album Easy Come, Easy Go, in 2009. The song "I'll Be Home", meanwhile, had been written by Newman years previously, and was originally recorded in 1970 by Harry Nilsson on his album Nilsson Sings Newman and by Tim Hardin on his 1972 album Painted Head.

The album's cover artwork is a photographic portrait of Randy Newman by Bob Seidemann. It shows Newman standing on the West 7th Street overpass above the I-110 freeway in the Financial District of Los Angeles.

== Critical reception ==
Professional ratings
Review scores
Source	Rating
AllMusic	3.5/5 stars
The Encyclopedia of Popular Music	4/5 stars
Rolling Stone	3/5 stars
The Village Voice	B+

The New York Times opined that Little Criminals "is the first Newman album with a full complement of musical witticisms to match the verbal ones." Record World said that the single "Baltimore" "is as serious as 'Short People' was funny, and its haunting melody and dramatic lyric linger well." The album placed 8th in the 1977 Pazz & Jop Critics Poll, and in 2000 it was voted number 468 in Colin Larkin's All Time Top 1000 Albums.

== Track listing ==
All tracks are written by Randy Newman.

Side one
No.	Title	Length
1.	"Short People"	2:54
2.	"You Can't Fool the Fat Man"	2:44
3.	"Little Criminals"	3:04
4.	"Texas Girl at the Funeral of Her Father"	2:40
5.	"Jolly Coppers on Parade"	3:46
6.	"In Germany Before the War"	3:39

Side two
No.	Title	Length
7.	"Sigmund Freud's Impersonation of Albert Einstein in America"	3:02
8.	"Baltimore"	4:02
9.	"I'll Be Home"	2:47
10.	"Rider in the Rain"	3:54
11.	"Kathleen (Catholicism Made Easier)"	3:35
12.	"Old Man on the Farm"	2:14

== Personnel ==
==== Musicians ====
- Randy Newman – vocals, piano, keyboards, synthesizers, arrangements, conductor
- Michael Boddicker – synthesizer programming
- Ralph Grierson – piano (4)
- Waddy Wachtel – guitar (1, 5, 9–10)
- Glenn Frey – guitar (3, 8), backing vocals (1, 8, 10)
- Joe Walsh – guitar (3, 11), slide guitar (3)
- Ry Cooder – mandolin (11)
- Klaus Voormann – bass (1, 5, 9)
- Willie Weeks – bass (2, 3, 7–8, 10–11)
- Milt Holland – congas (1, 2, 5), percussion (3, 8)
- Jim Keltner – drums (1, 5, 7, 9), temple blocks (5)
- Andy Newmark – drums (2, 3, 8)
- Rick Marotta – drums (3, 8, 10–11)
- J. D. Souther – backing vocals (1, 8, 10)
- Timothy B. Schmit – backing vocals (1)
- Don Henley – backing vocals (10)

==== Technical ====
- Produced by Lenny Waronker and Russ Titelman
- Engineered by Lee Herschberg and Loyd Clifft
- Remix engineer – Lee Herschberg
- Cover photography – Bob Seidemann (at 1013 7th Street, Los Angeles, California)
- Cover design – Mike Salisbury
- Production assistants – Sue Bridgman and Noel Newbolt

== Charts ==
=== Weekly charts ===
Chart (1977–1978)	Peak position
Australian Albums (Kent Music Report)	29
Canadian Albums (RPM)	9
Dutch Albums (Album Top 100)	3
New Zealand Albums (RMNZ)	26
US Billboard 200	9

=== Year-end charts ===
Chart (1977)	Position
Dutch Albums (Album Top 100)	18
Chart (1978)	Position
Canada RPM 100	47
US Billboard 200	53

== Sales and certifications ==
Certifications for Little Criminals
Region	Certification	Certified units/sales
Canada (Music Canada)	Gold	50,000^{^}
Netherlands (NVPI)	Gold	50,000^{^}
United States (RIAA)	Gold	500,000^{^}
^{^} Shipments figures based on certification alone.
