= Short People =

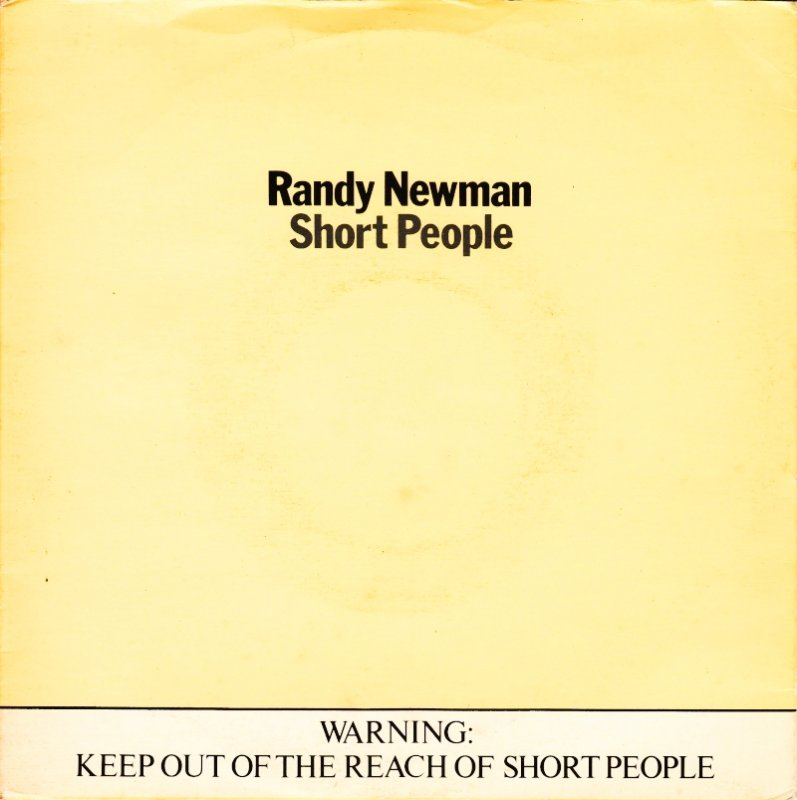
- UK cover

Single by Randy Newman

from the album Little Criminals
- B-side: "Old Man on the Farm"
- Released: November 1977
- Recorded: 1977
- Genre: Novelty rock
- Length: 2:54
- Label: Warner Bros.
- Songwriter: Randy Newman
- Producers: Lenny Waronker, Russ Titelman

Randy Newman singles chronology
"Birmingham" (1974)	"Short People" (1977)	"Baltimore" (1977)

Official video
- "Short People" on YouTube

"Short People" is a song by Randy Newman from his 1977 album, Little Criminals. With lyrics scathingly criticizing short people, Newman intended the song as a parody of prejudice. As with many of his songs, Newman wrote the song from the viewpoint of a biased narrator.

== Production and reception ==
The song follows a basic musical formula with bass and drums centering on Newman's catchy pop piano line in the key of A major. A small brass section and an electric guitar occasionally rise into the mix and conga drums, played by Los Angeles–based session musician Milt Holland, also feature prominently in the song.

Although Newman had never charted a single before, and his preceding album, Good Old Boys, had been the first to reach the Top 150 on Billboard’s Pop Albums chart, "Short People" soon gained attention as a novelty song. It became a major hit on radio, peaking at No. 2 on the Billboard Hot 100 for three weeks. It became a gold record. The song was included in most of Newman's greatest hits albums. Record World said the single was "one of the funniest of any year." Newman re-recorded the song for his 2016 album The Randy Newman Songbook Vol. 3.

In 1978, Isaiah Dixon, a member of the Maryland House of Delegates, sought to propose a law to make it illegal to broadcast "Short People" on the radio. However, Maryland's Attorney General, Francis B. Burch, advised that such a law would violate the First Amendment to the United States Constitution.

Newman would later grow to dislike the song and its success, eventually calling it a "bad break", a "novelty record like 'The Chipmunks'" and said received several threats who thought his criticism of short people was serious. He said, "I had no idea that there was any sensitivity, I mean, that anyone could believe that anyone was as crazy as that character. To have that kind of animus against short people, and then to sing it and put it all in song and have a philosophy on it."

== Chart performance ==
=== Weekly charts ===
Chart (1977–1978)	Peak position
Australia	12
Belgium (Ultratop 50 Flanders)	22
Canada Top Singles (RPM)	2
Canada Adult Contemporary (RPM)	1
New Zealand (Recorded Music NZ)	21
U.S. Billboard Hot 100	2
U.S. Billboard Adult Contemporary	25
U.S. Cash Box Top 100	1

=== Year-end charts ===
Chart (1978)	Rank
Canada Top Singles	30
U.S. Billboard Hot 100	41
U.S. Cash Box	15

== Sales and certifications ==
Region	Certification	Certified units/sales
United States (RIAA)	Gold	1,000,000^{^}
^{^} Shipments figures based on certification alone.

== Personnel ==
=== Musicians ===
- Randy Newman ‒ lead vocals, piano, synthesizer
- Glenn Frey ‒ backing vocals
- JD Souther ‒ backing vocals
- Jim Keltner ‒ drums
- Klaus Voormann ‒ bass guitar
- Milt Holland ‒ congas
- Timothy B. Schmit ‒ backing vocals
- Waddy Wachtel ‒ electric guitar
- Mike Boddicker ‒ synthesizer

=== Technical ===
- Lee Herschberg ‒ recording, mixing, mastering
- Lenny Waronker ‒ producer
- Loyd Clifft ‒ engineer
- Russ Titelman ‒ producer

== See also ==
- List of Cash Box Top 100 number-one singles of 1978
