= William Price Fox =

American novelist

- Born: William Price Fox Jr. April 9, 1926; Waukegan, Illinois, U.S.
- Died: April 19, 2015 (aged 89)
- Education: University of South Carolina
- Occupation: Novelist
- Spouse: Sarah Gilbert (Fox)
- Children: 2

William Price Fox (April 9, 1926 – April 19, 2015) was an American novelist, who wrote Southern Fried and Doctor Golf. Fox has contributed to publications such as Sports Illustrated, the Los Angeles Times, USA Today and Atlantic Monthly.

== Early life ==
William Price Fox Jr. was born in Waukegan, Illinois and lived in South Carolina most of his life. In 2008, he moved to Baltimore, Maryland and then Washington, D.C.

== Education ==
Fox dropped out of high school to join the U.S. Army Air Forces during World War II. He lied about his age in order to enroll. After his military service ended, Fox finished the coursework to receive his high school diploma. He later graduated from the University of South Carolina and studied writing under Caroline Gordon.

== Professional ==
Fox taught writing at the famed Iowa Writers' Workshop and was the Writer-In-Residence at the University of South Carolina until 2007.

== Journalism ==
Fox wrote for USA Today, the Atlantic Monthly, Golf Digest, Golf Illustrated, Golf Magazine, Sports Illustrated, The Saturday Evening Post, Millionaire Magazine, American Heritage, the Los Angeles Times, and the Village Voice, as well as countless other publications.

== Critical reception ==
"And then I got into this writer, William Price Fox, who wrote Dixiana Moon and a lot of short stories. He's just great with detail." Bruce Springsteen, Musician

"The picaresque slapstick of Pitching Tents reminds me of early William Price Fox, where the novelist doesn't seem to be so much writing and plotting as mixing up his own special brew." James Wolcott, Vanity Fair

"If stores had the good taste and decency to separate books by sensibility, [Brett] Butler would fit right next to writers like Lee Smith and William Price Fox, Southerners whose emotions go a mile deep and who remain tough and funny in very dark circumstances." Charles Taylor, Salon

Kurt Vonnegut Jr (--on Fox's Southern Fried ):

Thank God—at last, a humorist who can make us laugh! What an idea! Bill Fox stands a good chance of capturing the laugh Americans used to give to Mark Twain in simpler times. He's brilliant.

P.G. Wodehouse (--on Fox's Doctor Golf): "It's just the golf book that was needed ... very funny!"

John Updike (--on Fox's Doctor Golf): "Golf in the Kingdom" put me in mind of another curious devotional work, William Price Fox's "Doctor Golf."Doctor Golf, a fanatic even quainter and keener than Shivas Irons, runs a thirty-nine-member golf sanctuary in Arkansas called Eagle-Ho, refers to "young Hagen," advocates caddy flogging, sells by mail order a clanking, cumbersome line of golf paraphernalia, and conducts a large correspondence. When one correspondent writes,"I am in my 65th year and I have been seized by golflike a mouse in the claws of a golden eagle,"Doctor Golf congratulates him:

Dear Sir, Only after the fetters of youth have been flung aside can golf enter. Only then can the man know the folly of his adolescent belief of the swing answering to the man and perceive the joy and the truth of the complete man answering to the swing. And, as the years and the eagles cascade by, the even greater joy is realized when he stands in the bright sunlight of complete fulfillment and comes to realize that the swing is the man.

The swing is the man. The Dance of Shiva, Michael Murphy ("Golf in the Kingdom") concludes, is at the heart of everything. Doctor Golf is more mystical still:

The swing by its very nature transcends the human form. The swing is there when you pass on ... The swing, sir ... is like the blue in the sky, immutable, eternal, indeed transcendental.

Walt Kelly (creator of Pogo-- on Fox's Moonshine Light/Moonshine Bright): "He has put down a modern generation of gasoline crazy kids in its true, bittersweet, hilarious best and, thank God, worst ... As we understand the 1850s ... because of a couple of histories of boys written by a fellow named Twain, so here can we get a slippery eyeball on the speed boys of today ... these boys are universal ... these are southerners who are very boy."

Richard Yates (on Fox's Ruby Red): "William Price Fox is a natural-- and better still, he's an original ... the story is wholly alive and couldn't have been brought to life by anyone else. I think it's a beautiful piece of work."

== Writer's Workshop Series for P.B.S. ==
Fox organized and hosted the Writer's Workshop series on PBS, featuring interviews and workshops with these famous writers:

- James Dickey
- Nora Ephron
- John Gardner
- John Hawkes
- John Irving
- Pauline Kael
- James Alan McPherson
- George Plimpton
- Reynolds Price
- Susan Sontag
- Stephen Spender
- William Styron
- Kurt Vonnegut
- Tom Wolfe

== Personal life ==
Bill was married to novelist/artist Sarah Gilbert (Fox). They have one daughter named Jenkins. He had a son, Colin, and a daughter, Kathy, from previous marriages. He died on April 19, 2015, ten days after his 89th birthday.

== Bibliography ==
- Southern Fried
- Southern Fried Plus Six
- Moonshine Light, Moonshine Bright
- Ruby Red
- Dixiana Moon
- Chitlin Strut and Other Madrigals
- Hurricane Hugo: Storm of the Century
- Golfing in the Carolinas
- South Carolina: Off The Beaten Path
- Doctor Golf
- Satchel Paige's America (voted as one of the best books of 2007 by The Library Journal)
- Wild Blue Yonder

== Notes ==
William Price Fox - New York Times obituary
