= Lester Maddox =

American politician from Georgia (1915–2003)

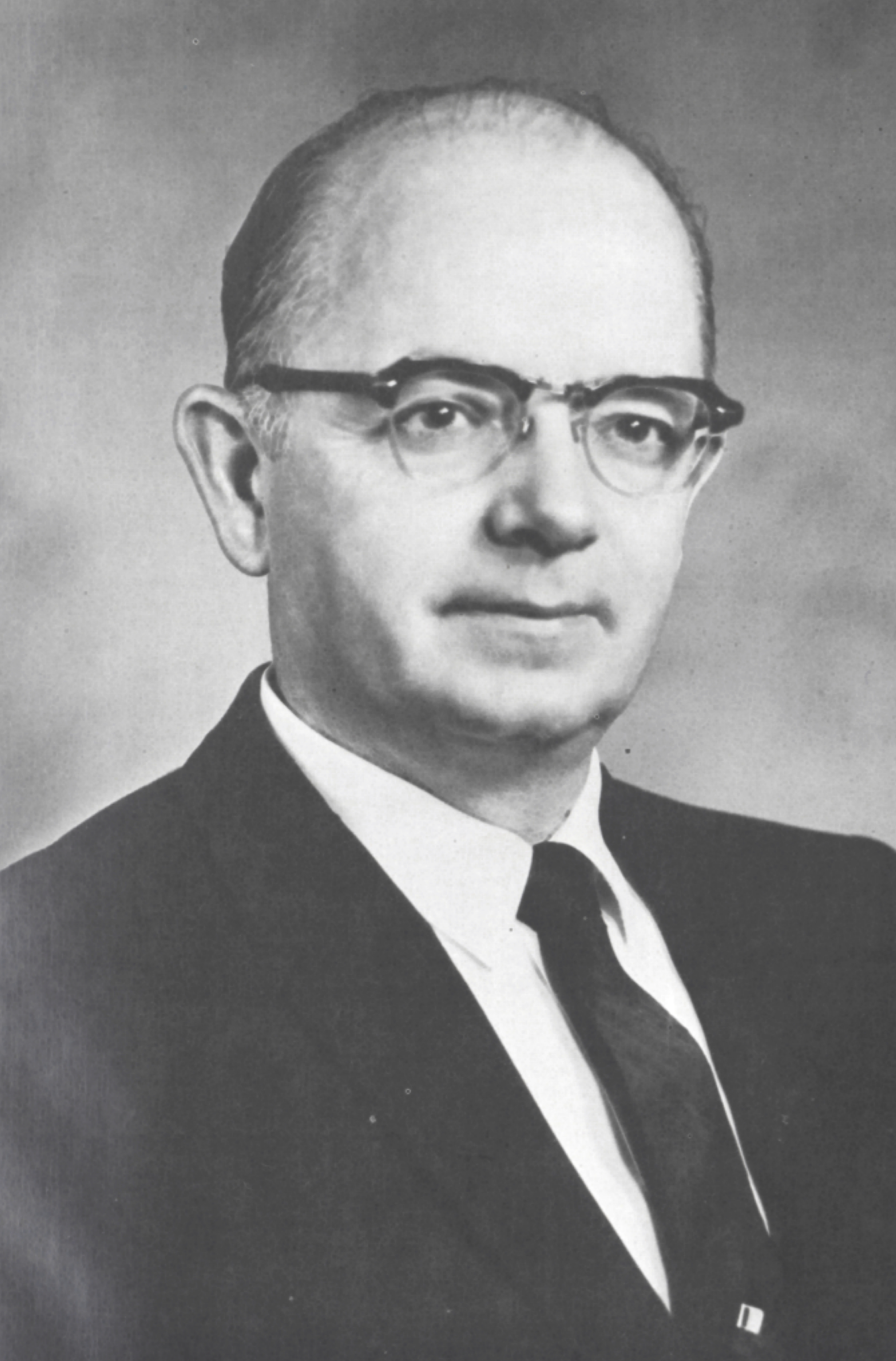
- Maddox in 1967

75th Governor of Georgia
- In office January 10, 1967 – January 12, 1971
- Lieutenant: George T. Smith
- Preceded by: Carl Sanders
- Succeeded by: Jimmy Carter

7th Lieutenant Governor of Georgia
- In office January 12, 1971 – January 14, 1975
- Governor: Jimmy Carter
- Preceded by: George T. Smith
- Succeeded by: Zell Miller

Personal details
- Born: Lester Garfield Maddox; September 30, 1915 Atlanta, Georgia, U.S.
- Died: June 25, 2003 (aged 87) Atlanta, Georgia, U.S.
- Resting place: Arlington Memorial Park; Sandy Springs, Georgia, U.S.
- Party: Democratic
- Other political affiliations: American Independent (1968, 1976)
- Spouse: Hattie Virginia Cox (m. 1935; died 1997)
- Children: 4

Lester Garfield Maddox Sr. (September 30, 1915 – June 25, 2003) was an American politician who served as the 75th governor of Georgia from 1967 to 1971.

A populist Southern Democrat, Maddox came to prominence as a staunch segregationist, when he refused to serve African-American customers in his Atlanta restaurant, the Pickrick, in violation of the Civil Rights Act of 1964. He was soon after elected governor in 1966. Ineligible to run for a second consecutive term in 1970, he sought and won election as lieutenant governor instead, serving alongside his successor as governor, Jimmy Carter. Maddox later ran for president in 1976 for the American Independent Party.

== Childhood ==
Maddox was born in Atlanta, Georgia, the second of nine children born to Dean Garfield Maddox, a steelworker, and his wife, the former Flonnie Castleberry. Maddox left school shortly before graduation to help support the family by taking odd jobs, including real estate and grocery. He received his high school diploma through correspondence courses. During World War II, Maddox worked at the Bell Aircraft factory in Marietta, Georgia, producing the B-29 Superfortress bomber.

== Restaurant ownership ==
In 1944, Maddox, along with his wife Hattie Virginia (née Cox, 1918–1997), used $400 in savings to open a combination grocery store-and-restaurant called Lester's Grill. Building on that success, the couple then bought property on Hemphill Avenue near the Georgia Institute of Technology campus to open up the Pickrick Restaurant.

Maddox made the Pickrick a family affair, with his wife and children also working with him. Known for its simple, inexpensive Southern cuisine, including its specialty, skillet-fried chicken, the Pickrick soon became a thriving business. The restaurant also provided Maddox with his first political forum. He placed advertising which featured cartoon chickens in the Atlanta newspapers. Following the 1954 Brown v. Board of Education decision of the United States Supreme Court, these restaurant ads began to feature the cartoon chickens commenting on the political questions of the day. However, Maddox's refusal to adjust to changes following the passage of the Civil Rights Act of 1964 manifested itself when he filed a lawsuit to continue his segregationist policies. Maddox said that he would close his restaurant rather than serve African Americans. An initial group of black demonstrators came to the restaurant but did not enter when Maddox informed them that he had a large number of black employees. In April 1964, more African Americans attempted to enter the restaurant. Maddox confronted the group with a bare pickaxe handle. Maddox provides the following account of the events:

Mostly customers, with only a few employees, voluntarily removed the twelve Pickrick Drumsticks, (a euphemism for pickaxe handles) from the nail kegs on each side of the large dining room fireplace. They had been forewarned by the arrival of Atlanta's news media of an impending attempted invasion of our restaurant by the racial demonstrators and once the demonstrators and agitators arrived, the customers and employees pulled the drumsticks (pickaxe handles) from the kegs and went outside to defend against the threatened invasion.

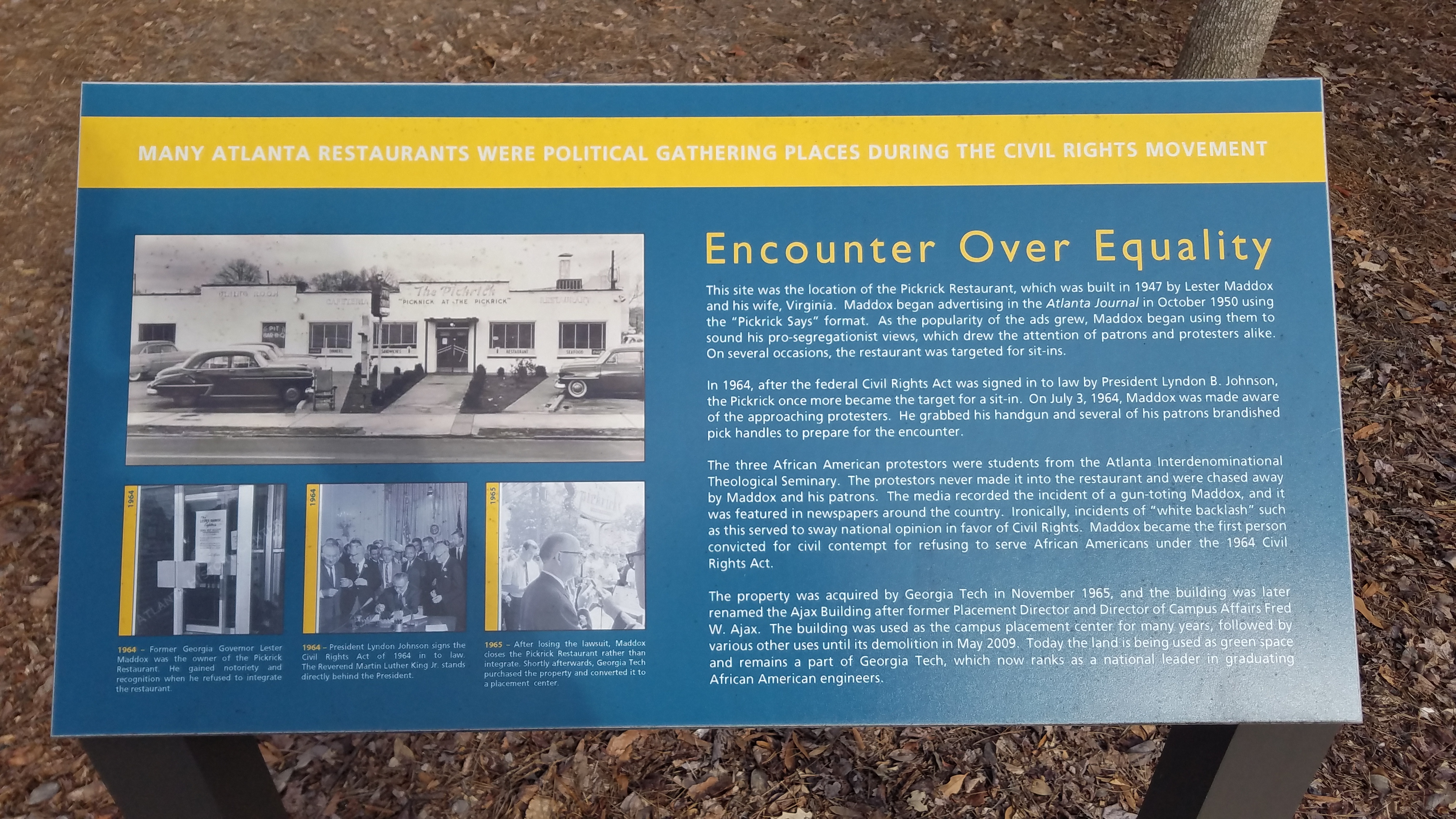
Marker at the spot of the Pickrick at Georgia Tech

The "invasion" Maddox referred to was three black seminary students who had asked to be seated.

Maddox gained the approval of segregationists by leasing and then selling the restaurant to employees rather than agreeing to serve black customers. He claimed that the issue was not hostility to blacks, but constitutional property rights. He even built a monument to "private property rights" near the restaurant.

The Civil Rights Digital Library at the University of Georgia contains the following account of the closing of his restaurant:

Maddox closed the Pickrick on August 13 and reopened the business on September 26 as the Lester Maddox Cafeteria, where he pledged to serve only "acceptable" Georgians. During a trial for contempt of court on September 29, Maddox argued against the charges because he was no longer offering service to out-of-state travelers or integrationists. On February 5, 1965, a federal court ruled that Maddox was in contempt of court for failing to obey the injunction and assigned fines of two hundred dollars a day for failing to serve African Americans. Maddox ultimately closed his restaurant on February 7, 1965, rather than integrate it; he claimed that President Lyndon Johnson and communists put him out of business.

The building was purchased by Georgia Tech in 1965; it was used for many years as the placement center and was later known as the Ajax building. It was demolished in May 2009.

== Political career ==
=== Early campaigns ===
During his ownership of the Pickrick, Maddox, a Democrat, failed in two bids for mayor of Atlanta. In 1957, he lost to incumbent William B. Hartsfield, for whom the Hartsfield–Jackson Atlanta International Airport is named. Hartsfield had pursued a more moderate approach to racial issues. In 1961, Maddox lost to Ivan Allen, Jr., with whom he split the white vote. Allen's ability to garner virtually all of the black vote provided his margin of victory.

In 1962, Maddox ran for lieutenant governor as a Democrat, against Peter Zack Geer, a candidate with whom he shared segregationist and states' rights views. In an effort to differentiate themselves from each other, each attempted to paint the other as an extremist. Geer won the race, 55–45%, but Maddox gained attention across the state.

In the following years, Maddox proclaimed himself a "Society of Liberty" martyr intent on opposing a central government which thwarted states' rights and gave special protection to minority groups. He was recognized by his rimless eyeglasses, dome-shaped forehead, bald head, and nervous energy. It was said of Maddox, "We have a populist revolution in its truest sense moving here. White people who work with their hands see in Lester Maddox a man of their own kind and are fighting to elect him [as governor]." Time magazine termed Maddox a "strident racist"; Newsweek viewed him as a "backwoods demagogue out in the boondocks". According to one account, the former restaurateur's appeal transcended race to embrace a right-wing brand of "populism", picturing government, rather than big business, as the villain.

=== 1966 election ===
When Maddox sought the Democratic nomination for governor in 1966, his principal primary opponent was former governor Ellis Arnall. That election was still in the era of Democratic Party dominance in Georgia, when winning the Democratic primary was tantamount to election. There was no Republican primary at the time, but there were voters who identified with the Republican Party. Republicans cast ballots in the open Democratic primary election, and some chose the candidate they believed would most likely lose the general election to their nominee, Howard "Bo" Callaway. In the primary, Arnall won a plurality of the popular vote, but he was denied the required majority. Maddox, the second-place candidate, entered the runoff election against Arnall. State senator Jimmy Carter finished in a strong third place. Again, some Republicans voted in the Democratic primary runoff. Arnall barely campaigned in the runoff, and Maddox emerged victorious, 443,055 to 373,004.

Maddox quipped that he had been nominated despite having "no money, no politicians, no television, no newspapers, no Martin Luther King, no Lyndon Johnson, and we made it!" He joked further that Johnson had been "the best campaign manager I've got even if he did put me out of business", a reference to the closing of the Pickrick Restaurant to avoid desegregation. On winning the runoff, the Baptist Maddox, who neither smoked nor drank alcohol, described God as his "campaign manager".

Stunned Arnall supporters announced a write-in candidacy for the general election, insisting that Georgians must have the option of a moderate Democrat beside the conservatives Maddox and Callaway. In his general election campaign, Maddox equated the Callaway Republicans to the American Civil War and the 1864 March to the Sea waged in Georgia by Union general William Tecumseh Sherman. He criticized the Callaway family textile mill, which he alleged had kept wages at $10 a week in Troup County. Maddox said that Callaway was unable to relate to farmers, small businessmen, and the unemployed: "He would be a lot better off if he knew about people as well as dollars." Maddox said that Callaway Gardens had hired off-duty police officers to maintain segregation at the tourist park in Pine Mountain, but a superior court judge verified that Callaway had an open admission policy at the facility.

Callaway won a plurality in the general election, becoming the first Republican gubernatorial candidate to top the polls in Georgia since the close of Reconstruction, and Maddox finished second. More than 52,000 wrote in Arnall's name. Under the election rules then in effect, the state legislature was required to elect one of the two candidates with the highest number of votes, which meant that the lawmakers could not consider Arnall. With the legislature overwhelmingly dominated by Democrats, all of whom had been required to sign a Democratic loyalty oath, Maddox became governor. He was sworn in on the evening of January 10, 1967, minutes after the legislature certified his election.

=== Governor of Georgia ===
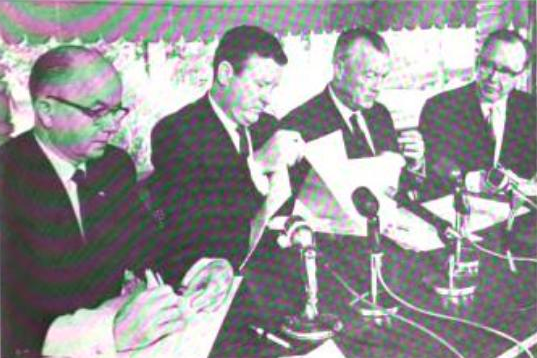
Maddox (left) at a Coastal Plains Regional Commission meeting in 1967

Maddox campaigned hard for states' rights and maintained a segregationist stance while in office. Upon the assassination of Martin Luther King Jr., he denied the slain civil rights leader the honor of lying in state in the Georgia state capitol after being told by undercover agents in the Atlanta Police Department that there was a planned storming of the state capitol by participants in the crowd of mourners. No evidence has ever emerged that this was anything more than a rumor; the undercover agents provided no evidence for it other than their statement. As a precaution, Maddox stationed 160 state troopers to surround the capitol. Regardless, the funeral procession, attended by tens of thousands; was entirely peaceful. Maddox called MLK an "enemy of the people" after his assassination and refused to attend his funeral. Maddox considered personally raising flags that had been placed at half-mast at the State Capitol after MLK's assassination and reportedly decided against doing so because news cameras were nearby. In 1968, Maddox announced his candidacy for the Democratic nomination for president just prior to that year's Democratic National Convention but withdrew on its fourth and final day. He later endorsed the former Democrat George Wallace, the then pro-segregation American Independent Party candidate in the 1968 presidential election. After leaving office, Maddox said "I'm still a segregationist. I've told you that 15 times. When are you going to start believing me?"

When he was asked what might be done to improve the abysmal conditions in Georgia prisons, Maddox replied that what was really needed was a better class of prisoner. Maddox's chief of staff was Zell Miller, who went on to serve two terms as governor in the 1990s and as Paul Coverdell's successor in the U.S. Senate. Maddox received the honorary degree of Doctor of Laws from Bob Jones University in 1969.

In 1968, a small Atlanta repertory company produced a play entitled Red, White and Maddox. The play ridiculed Maddox and imagined him winning the 1972 U.S. presidential election, then starting a war with the Soviet Union. The show came to Broadway and ran for forty-one performances at the Cort Theatre before closing. Maddox was a supporter of the Vietnam War because of his anti-communist views, and he often told Georgia about the threats of communist and socialist influences. Maddox also championed private enterprise over government intervention, proclaiming in 1970 that the former "can wipe out more poverty in one year than government can erase in a quarter," while also claiming that "Government continues to escalate its own war on poverty, and next week you're going to work a day or two for some bum who won't work."

==== Accomplishments in office ====
In the 1966 campaign, the Savannah Morning News forecast that as governor, Maddox would "tell off the federal government forty times a day, but four years after his inauguration, he would have accomplished little else". Once in office, however, Maddox accomplished the following:

- Maddox was favorably influenced by Murray M. Silver, Esq., General Counsel of the Georgia Department of Labor, and Commissioner Sam Caldwell to hire blacks and to approve legislation affecting unemployment insurance of automobile workers within the state.
- Maddox integrated the Georgia State Patrol, appointed the first African American to head a state-wide government department, appointed the first African American Georgia Bureau of Investigation agent, appointed the first African American to a draft board in Georgia, integrated Georgia's farmer's markets' lines, and directed state troopers not to address African Americans as "niggers".
- Maddox introduced Little People's Day where normal people could meet the governor twice a month. After 4 escaped African-American convicts met with him on Little People's Day and informed him about terrible conditions in state prisons, Maddox launched an investigation of state prisons and ordered state prisons to make improvements.

Years after Maddox's gubernatorial term ended, Republican Benjamin B. Blackburn described Maddox as a "far better governor than his critics will ever admit". Blackburn, a former U.S. representative, also noted that no accusation of corruption was made against Maddox, whose administration was characterized by economic development and the appointment of African Americans to state executive positions.

=== Lieutenant Governor of Georgia ===
Under the Georgia constitution of 1945, Maddox was prohibited from running for a second consecutive term. He therefore waged his second bid for lieutenant governor, the first having resulted in defeat to Peter Zack Geer in 1962. Although Maddox was elected as a Democratic candidate at the same time as Jimmy Carter's election as governor, the two were not running mates; in Georgia, particularly in that era of Democratic dominance, the winners of the primary elections went on to easy victories in the general elections without campaigning together as an official ticket or as running mates. Carter and Maddox found little common ground during their four years of service, often publicly feuding with each other.

Shortly after that election, Maddox appeared as a guest on The Dick Cavett Show on December 18, 1970. During a commercial break, fellow guest and former football player Jim Brown asked Maddox if he had "any trouble with the white bigots because of all the things you did for blacks". On the air, Cavett substituted the word "admirers" in place of "bigots", enraging Maddox. After demanding an apology from Cavett, and getting a carefully worded form of it, following further conversation, Maddox still walked off the show. Making light of the incident during a subsequent appearance by Maddox, Cavett walked off this time, and Maddox applauded.

Because the lieutenant governor was a mostly ceremonial role, Maddox spent most of his time as lieutenant governor preparing for a run for governor in 1974. Maddox was considered to be a near shoo-in to regain the governor's mansion in 1974, with the New York Times predicting that only John Wayne could beat him for Georgia governor. Campaign literature in support of Maddox’s bid for governor cited gains in health, education and penal reform during his tenure while also presenting Maddox as a champion of labor, citing measures introduced during his time as governor and lieutenant-governor such as Georgia’s first minimum wage law, improvements in workmen’s compensation benefits, and the end of a one-week waiting period for unemployment benefits. In the end, Maddox was forced into a runoff for the Democratic nomination, where he was defeated by George Busbee.

=== 1976 presidential election ===
When Carter ran for president in 1976, Maddox ran against him as the nominee of Wallace's former American Independent Party, saying that his former rival was "the most dishonest man I ever met". Maddox and running mate William Dyke, the former mayor of Madison, Wisconsin, received 170,373 votes in the election (less than 1% of the vote) and no electoral votes.

Maddox 1976 presidential campaign bumper sticker

=== Retirement ===
With his political career seemingly over and with massive debts stemming from his 1974 gubernatorial bid, Maddox began a short-lived nightclub comedy career in 1977 with an African American musician, Bobby Lee Fears, who had worked as a busboy in his restaurant. (Note: Bobby Lee Fears was a native of Atlanta, who had previously worked as a guitarist and vocalist for the Fabulous Denos, who had a number of releases on the King label. He later joined an early incarnation of the Ohio Players before cutting around three solo records under his own name and using the alias Bobby Dixon.) Fears had served time in prison for a drug offense before Maddox, as lieutenant governor, was able to assist him in obtaining a pardon. Calling themselves "The Governor and the Dishwasher," the duo performed comedy bits built around the Governor's subjugation over the Dishwasher, the Dishwasher's lack of intelligence, and musical numbers with Maddox on harmonica and Fears on guitar.

== Later years ==
=== 1980s ===
After Korean Air Lines Flight 007 was shot down in 1983, with U.S. Representative Larry McDonald aboard, a special election was held to fill his seat in Congress. Lester Maddox stated his intention to run for the seat if McDonald's wife, Kathy McDonald, did not. However, Kathy McDonald decided to run, and Maddox stayed out of the race; she lost to Democrat George "Buddy" Darden.

Maddox had been using drugs from a Bahamian cancer clinic to treat his prostate cancer. In July 1985, he revealed that the clinic had been shut down by Bahamian officials after its drugs had been found to be contaminated with the AIDS virus. Maddox underwent testing, and two months later announced that he was free of the virus.

During the 1987 Forsyth County protests in January of that year, Maddox attended a rally organized by members of the Ku Klux Klan after the group had attacked several dozen marchers who were protesting against racial discrimination in the county. J. B. Stoner, a white supremacist who had previously been imprisoned for bombing a black church in 1958, was also at the rally.

=== 1990s ===
Maddox made one final unsuccessful bid for governor in 1990, then underwent heart surgery the following year. In the 1990 Democratic primary for governor, Maddox finished with about three percent of the vote. He remained a visible figure in his home community of Cobb County for the remainder of his life. In 1992 and 1996, Maddox crossed party lines and endorsed unsuccessful populist Republican Pat Buchanan for the presidency. His last public speech was in Atlanta in 2001 at the annual national conference of the Council of Conservative Citizens. The CCC, of which Maddox was a charter member, is considered by the Southern Poverty Law Center and the Anti-Defamation League to be a white supremacist group.

== Personal life ==
In 1935, Maddox married seventeen-year-old Hattie Virginia Cox. Maddox's wife nursed him through all his illnesses and supported his political and business career, even though he had to spend much time away from the family.

=== Death ===
On June 25, 2003, after a fall while recuperating from intestinal surgery in an Atlanta hospice, Maddox died of complications from pneumonia and prostate cancer. He and his wife Virginia are both interred at Arlington Memorial Park in Sandy Springs in northern Fulton County, Georgia. Due to a successful business career, Maddox was relatively wealthy when he died.

== Legacy ==
After Maddox's death in 2003, Tom Murphy, the former Speaker of the Georgia House of Representatives, said of the former governor: "He had a reputation as a segregationist, but he told us he was not a segregationist, but that you should be able to associate with whoever you wanted. He went on to do more for African Americans than any governor of Georgia up until that time." This view is not universally shared. In its obituary of the former governor, The New York Times called him an "arch segregationist"; to support this contention, the Times noted that his convictions included "the view that blacks were intellectually inferior to whites, that integration was a Communist plot, that segregation was somewhere justified in scripture and that a federal mandate to integrate [all-white] schools was 'ungodly, un-Christian and un-American.'" Despite this, the obituary notes that after becoming governor, Maddox "surprised many by hiring and promoting blacks in state government and by initiating an early release program for the state prison system".

The Interstate Highway 75 bridge over the Chattahoochee River at the boundary of Cobb County (Vinings) and Fulton County (Atlanta), is named the "Lester and Virginia Maddox Bridge".

Maddox was the primary inspiration for Randy Newman's 1974 song "Rednecks".

== See also ==
- Conservative Democrat
- Dixiecrat

== Notes ==
Party political offices
Preceded by Carl Sanders	Democratic nominee for Governor of Georgia; 1966	Succeeded by Jimmy Carter
Preceded by George T. Smith	Democratic nominee for Lieutenant Governor of Georgia; 1970	Succeeded by Zell Miller
Preceded by John Schmitz	American Independent nominee for President of the United States; 1976	Succeeded by John Rarick
Political offices
Preceded by Carl Sanders	Governor of Georgia; 1967–1971	Succeeded by Jimmy Carter
Preceded by George Smith	Lieutenant Governor of Georgia; 1971–1975	Succeeded by Zell Miller
