= Cold Turkey (1971 film) =

1971 film by Norman Lear

- 1971 movie poster by Sandy Kossin
- Directed by: Norman Lear
- Screenplay by: Norman Lear
- Story by: Norman Lear; William Price Fox, Jr.
- Based on: I'm Giving Them Up for Good by Margaret and Neil Rau
- Produced by: Norman Lear
- Starring: Dick Van Dyke; Pippa Scott; Tom Poston; Edward Everett Horton; Bob and Ray; Bob Newhart
- Cinematography: Charles F. Wheeler
- Edited by: John C. Horger
- Music by: Randy Newman
- Production company: Tandem Productions
- Distributed by: United Artists
- Release dates: January 30, 1971 (Premiere); February 3, 1971 (Des Moines)
- Running time: 101 minutes
- Country: United States
- Language: English
- Box office: $11,000,000

Cold Turkey is a 1971 satirical black comedy film starring Dick Van Dyke and a long list of comedic actors. The film was written for the screen, produced, and directed by Norman Lear, marking his directorial debut and his only directorial feature film credit. Cold Turkey was based on the unpublished novel I'm Giving Them Up for Good by Margaret and Neil Rau. Randy Newman composed and performed original music for the film.

In the film, the fictional Valiant Tobacco Company stages a publicity stunt, offering $25 million tax-free dollars to any American town whose entire population can stop smoking cigarettes for a month. A charismatic, ambitious preacher, Reverend Clayton Brooks, encourages the depressed small town of Eagle Rock, Iowa, to take on the challenge, but the town struggles to overcome its addiction to tobacco.

== Plot ==
As part of a public relations and marketing strategy to compare the empathy of Big Tobacco to the nobility of the Nobel Peace Prize, advertising executive Merwin Wren convinces the Valiant Tobacco Company to propose a challenge: a tax-free check for $25,000,000 ($219.5 million today) to any city or town in America that can stop smoking, going cold turkey, for thirty days.

According to Wren, the offer will generate Valiant worldwide free publicity and praise as a humanitarian gesture, but no town in America would ever be able to claim the prize, with cigarette smoking being too addictive to stop.

The Reverend Clayton Brooks, a kindly but fearsome minister of the Eagle Rock Community Church, takes up the challenge as a spiritual call. He urges the economically depressed community of Eagle Rock, Iowa, to go for the prize.

The town council has been trying to woo back the military ever since it closed a base a few years earlier, hoping its return would help the local cash flow. Families have been moving out almost on a monthly basis and the town center is almost deserted.

Reverend Brooks recruits every smoker in the town to sign up. Needled for being a former smoker, he begins smoking again to find solidarity with his "flock."

As the deadline to start the thirty-day clock approaches, only a very few of the town's residents haven't signed the no smoking pledge. One of them is alcoholic Edgar Stopworth, whom Reverend Brooks decides to pay a house call on, to convince him to take the pledge. But Edgar knows himself pretty well and in desperation tells the Reverend "My drinking is directly connected to my smoking. The booze bone's connected to the smoke bone." The Reverend looks defeated but comes up with the idea of Edgar leaving town for a thirty-day vacation, for which Edgar immediately departs.

At midnight, the challenge begins. For the next thirty days, no smoking is permitted, with Eagle Rock being the only city in America that got all of its smokers to pledge.

Once the smoking ban begins, Reverend Brooks gets extremely frustrated with not being able to smoke. His only relief is having frequent sex with his wife Natalie. At one point she barely gets finished making the bed and straightening up from the preceding episode before the Reverend is back home again for more.

The tobacco company sends Merwin to report the progress of the townspeople's commitment. The company needs just one person to fail. Among the weakest: the elderly Doctor Proctor, who must always have a cigarette before surgery, and the anxiety-ridden wife of the mayor, Mrs. Wappler, who counts the small gherkin pickles she eats as the hours pass. However, a group of 29 non-smoking residents, all members of the ultra-conservative Christopher Mott Society have been asked by Brooks to police all traffic entering Eagle Rock to ensure no tobacco products enter.

The attention of the nation's leading newscasters at the time turns the small community's efforts into a matter of highly publicized failure or success. Soon the community is invaded by buxom "massage therapists," beer vendors, souvenir shops and more. Rev. Brooks appears on a Time magazine cover, which leads him to another epiphany: if he can save the town, he will be a hero.

Merwin is told by Valiant's board members to undermine the town's efforts at all costs, doing whatever he must to get someone to smoke before the thirty days are up.

With a few minutes left to midnight, Merwin pulls out all the stops to make sure that someone smokes. He fixes it so that the town clock chimes midnight before it is midnight and has helicopters dropping cigarettes into the anxious crowd. Dr. Proctor frantically and desperately leaps into the crowd trying to smoke a cigarette. Reverend Brooks goes into the crowd to find and stop him. Merwin has a cigarette lighter shaped like a gun and is trying to get to Dr. Proctor. Odie Turman, an elderly lady, has a real gun and is lurking about in the crowd. A drunken Edgar Stopworth has just arrived in time for the midnight deadline. When Merwin, Reverend Brooks and Odie meet, they accidentally drop their lighter/guns on the ground. Merwin picks up what he think is the lighter and ends up shooting Dr. Proctor. Then Edgar walks up to Merwin, takes the gun away from him and mistakenly shoots him. Odie comes over, grabs the gun, and shoots Reverend Brooks.

Ultimately Eagle Rock succeeds and wins the $25 million prize. To cash in on the publicity, the President of the United States - ostensibly, President Richard M. Nixon who arrives in his motorcade, and begins waving both hands over his head in Nixon's characteristic two-fingered peace sign. The TV cameras, on scene to film the townspeople on the verge of winning (or possibly losing) the $25 million prize, frantically pan back and forth in a hurried, vain effort to capture the President on film, suddenly point skyward, where the crowd is beckoned to look. Far above, a blimp slowly reveals an illuminated message "Eagle Rock: Future Home of the Mercury Missile Plant" much to the stunned, cheering delight of the crowd gathered on the town square. This is followed by a second, apparently well-intended message "With Love From Your President."

As a group of Eagle Rock teens begins to walk away, the smokestacks of the new missile plant on the outskirts of town emit black smoke over Eagle Rock some years in the future.

== Cast ==
- Dick Van Dyke as Rev. Clayton Brooks
- Bob Newhart as Merwin Wren
- Pippa Scott as Natalie Brooks
- Tom Poston as Mr. Edgar Stopworth
- Edward Everett Horton as Hiram C. Grayson
- Bob Elliott as Newscasters: Hugh Upson; David Chetley; Sandy Van Andy;
- Ray Goulding as Newscasters: Walter Chronic; Paul Hardly; Arthur Lordly;
- Vincent Gardenia as Mayor Quincey L. Wappler
- Barnard Hughes as Dr. Proctor
- Graham Jarvis as Amos Bush
- Jean Stapleton as Mrs. Wappler
- Barbara Cason as Letitia Hornsby
- Judith Lowry as Odie Perman
- Sudie Bond as Cissy Perman
- Helen Page Camp as Mrs. Watson
- Paul Benedict as Zen Buddhist
- Simon Scott as Mr. Kandiss
- Raymond Kark as Homer Watson
- Peggy Rea as Mrs. Proctor
- Woodrow Parfrey as Tobacco Executive
- George Mann as Bishop Cross
- Charles Pinney as Col. Galloway
- M. Emmet Walsh as Art, Eagle Rock citizen
- Gloria LeRoy as Lotty Davenport, prostitute
- Eric Boles as Dennis Brooks
- Jack Grimes as TV Stage Manager
- Harvey Jason as O. O. Farster, Hypnotist
- Louis Zorich as Douglas Truesdale
- Glenn Yarbrough as Working stiff
- Ted Knight as Mr. Slick
- Charles White as Senator Sildge
- Robert Christopher as Television director
- Burt Prelutsky as Tourist asking for directions
- Mrs. Burt Prelutsky as Tourist's wife

== Production ==
Most of the film, which is set in the fictional small town of Eagle Rock, Iowa, was shot in and around Greenfield, Iowa, and many local people were used as extras. Some neighborhood scenes were shot in Winterset, Iowa. Additional filming took place in Des Moines. The Methodist church in Orient, Iowa and the bank in Macksburg, Iowa were used as well. The Grayson Mansion scenes were filmed at Terrace Hill, official residence of the governor of Iowa, located in Des Moines. The kitchen scenes with Jean Stapleton and Vincent Gardenia and several other exteriors were shot in Marshalltown, Iowa. Some were also shot in the town of Columbia in south-central Kentucky.

The film was shelved for two years by distributor United Artists over concerns about its box-office potential. It was released after the launch of Lear's television show All in the Family, with The New York Times comparing All In The Family and Cold Turkey as "gimmick" comedies which involved satire targeting of various aspects the American society. Jean Stapleton, who appeared in Cold Turkey, also played Edith Bunker on All In The Family, which Lear was also trying to sell to networks during production of the film.

Veteran actor Edward Everett Horton, whose career began in 1906, plays tobacco company president Hiram C. "Mr. Tobacco" Grayson in a wheelchair and without dialogue. This was Horton's final role as he died before the film was released. Director/producer Norman Lear has a three-second cameo approximately 2/3 of the way into the film. He is shown as one of the townspeople sitting down and crying because he is unable to get a cigarette fix.

The characters played by Bob and Ray are parodies of real-life news and broadcasting personalities: "Walter Chronic" (Walter Cronkite), "Hugh Upson" (Hugh Downs), "David Chetley" (Chet Huntley/David Brinkley), "Arthur Lordly" (Arthur Godfrey), "Paul Hardly" (Paul Harvey), and "Sandy Van Andy" (Sander Vanocur).

The film's promotional trailer is hosted by newscasters "Hardly Reasonable" (Harry Reasoner) and "Mike Walrus" (Mike Wallace). Neither the characters nor the actors who play them appear in the actual film; "Walrus" is played by Paul Dooley.

=== Music ===
Cold Turkey features original music by Randy Newman, including "He Gives Us All His Love", a ballad with a gospel influence that serves as the film's theme song. It was Newman's first film soundtrack.

In 2007 the Percepto Records label issued a limited-edition soundtrack CD for the film.

== Release ==
Cold Turkey premiered on January 30, 1971 at the Galaxy Theatre in Des Moines, Iowa. The film opened in 30 theaters in Iowa on February 3.

=== Home media ===
In 1993, Cold Turkey was released on VHS and LaserDisc in the pan-and-scan format. In 2010, the film was made available as a manufactured-on-demand DVD.

== Reception ==
=== Box office ===
Cold Turkey grossed $131,616 in its first five days in 30 theaters in seven towns. The film went on to earn $5.5 million in theatrical rentals in the United States and Canada.

Arthur Krim of United Artists later assessed the film during an evaluation of the company's inventory:

An old commitment to Dick Van Dyke, and what seemed to be a good idea for the American market, became an overpriced film with a has-been personality by the time of it's [sic] release. Albeit funny, the picture is way overpriced for its value, which is strictly for the American market – mainly for mid America. The producer and director went over a million dollars over budget on the film to deliver a minor American comedy with no overseas value. This film would be programmed today only if it could be made at one-half the cost.

=== Critical reception ===
Vincent Canby of The New York Times wrote that "it is, within its limitations, a very engaging, very funny movie." Variety called it "an often-hilarious, partly-muffed contemporary comedy" marred by "sluggish pacing" and a climax called "bizarre: Lear seems to have written himself into a corner, with no way out except to shift abruptly from human comedy to stylistic nonsense." Roger Ebert of the Chicago Sun-Times awarded the film four stars and praised several aspects of the production before concluding: "Even if you don't smoke, you'll find Cold Turkey funny." Gene Siskel of the Chicago Tribune awarded it two and a half stars out of four, calling it "a fine and funny idea for a short film," but "scene after scene runs too long. Too many gags are repeated too often." Charles Champlin of the Los Angeles Times called it "an enterprising, very amusing, very contemporary social commentary." Gary Arnold of The Washington Post wrote: "A shallow, self-deluding sort of comedy, it fails to make sense out of its own premise and characters and then tries to cover up by getting cynical about everything-in-general. It's as if Lear had been inspired to imitate Billy Wilder at his worst."
