= Good Old Boys (Randy Newman album) =

Studio album by Randy Newman
- Released: September 10, 1974
- Recorded: 1972–1974
- Studios: Warner Bros. Studios, North Hollywood, California
- Genres: Roots rock, country rock
- Length: 33:28
- Label: Reprise
- Producers: Lenny Waronker, Russ Titelman

Randy Newman chronology
Sail Away (1972)	Good Old Boys (1974)	Little Criminals (1977)

Good Old Boys is the fourth studio album by American musician Randy Newman, released on September 10, 1974, on Reprise Records, catalogue number 2193. It was Newman's first album to obtain major commercial success, peaking at number 36 on the Billboard 200 and number 58 in Canada. The premiere live performance of the album took place on October 5, 1974, at the Symphony Hall in Atlanta, Georgia, with guest Ry Cooder and Newman conducting the Atlanta Symphony Orchestra.

== Development ==
Good Old Boys was initially envisioned as a concept album about a character named Johnny Cutler, an everyman of the Deep South. Newman made a demo of these songs on February 1, 1973: they were released as the bonus disc for the 2002 reissue, titled Johnny Cutler's Birthday.

The kernel of this concept survived into the released album, although as Newman's take on viewpoints from the inhabitants of the Deep South in general, rather than from a single individual character. As on his previous release, Newman addressed generally taboo topics such as slavery and racism, most stridently on the opening song "Rednecks", a satire of both institutional racism in the Deep South and the hypocrisy of the northern states in response.

Newman also incorporates actual historical events into the album, remarking upon the Great Mississippi Flood of 1927 on "Louisiana 1927". Preceding an original song, "Kingfish," which recounts achievements and slogans of Louisiana politician Huey "The Kingfish" Long, Newman performs with members of the Eagles on a song written by Long himself, "Every Man a King".

As with all of Newman's early albums, some material Newman wrote had been previously recorded by other artists. In this case, "Guilty" had been initially recorded and released by Bonnie Raitt on her 1973 album Takin' My Time.

A lengthy analysis of Good Old Boys, including a detailed description of the Dick Cavett Show broadcast that inspired "Rednecks", is included in Steven Hart's essay "He May Be a Fool But He's Our Fool: Lester Maddox, Randy Newman, and the American Culture Wars", included in the collection Let the Devil Speak: Articles, Essays, and Incitements.

In 2014, Turntable Publishing released the ebook Song of the South: Randy Newman's Good Old Boys, by David Kastin, a full-length critical study of the album's sources, evolution, and reception. In the Sixth Edition of his classic Mystery Train, Greil Marcus cited Kastin's book as an "effectively-illustrated...excavation of the entire severed corpus of the work and a deep dive into the history—musical, social economic, sectional, and water-born—Newman both drew from and recast."

== Singles ==
On the same day as the album, the track "Guilty" was released as Reprise single 1324, with "Naked Man" on the B-side, and on January 29, 1975, the track "Louisiana 1927" was released as Reprise single 1387, with "Marie" on the flip. Neither single appeared on the Billboard Hot 100.

== Reception ==
Professional ratings
Review scores
Source	Rating
AllMusic	5/5 stars
Christgau's Record Guide	A
Pitchfork	9.3/10
Rolling Stone	5/5 stars
Encyclopedia of Popular Music	5/5 stars
Tom Hull	A−

Robert Christgau gave the album an A rating upon release, and in retrospective reviews both the 1992 edition of the Rolling Stone Album Guide and AllMusic gave it a five-star rating. In 2012, the album was ranked number 394 on Rolling Stone magazine's list of the 500 greatest albums of all time. In 2000 it was voted number 902 in Colin Larkin's All Time Top 1000 Albums. It spent two weeks in the top 40 of the Billboard 200 in late 1974, with an overall 21-week tenure. It also earned a gold record in the Netherlands.

On May 21, 2002, an expanded edition of the album was issued by Rhino Records on compact disc, including a bonus track demo of "Marie" and a second disc containing the February, 1973 demos entitled Johnny Cutler's Birthday. Included in these demo recordings are Newman's verbal descriptions of sound effects and other characters, the songs as a whole describing a narrative in the vein of integrated musicals dating from the 1940s. "Doctor, Doctor" is an early version of "Back on My Feet Again". The song "Marie" was used in the family film Paulie in 1998.

All tracks were written and arranged by Randy Newman (with the exception of "Every Man a King"); strings arranged by Nick DeCaro on "Marie" and "Rollin'"; Moog and ARP synthesizers programmed by Malcolm Cecil and Robert Margouleff.

== Track listing ==
All tracks are written by Randy Newman except where noted.

Side one
No.	Title	Length
1.	"Rednecks"	3:07
2.	"Birmingham"	2:45
3.	"Marie"	3:07
4.	"Mr. President (Have Pity on the Working Man)"	2:45
5.	"Guilty"	2:30

Side two
No.	Title	Writer(s)	Length
6.	"Louisiana 1927"		2:54
7.	"Every Man a King"	Huey Long, Castro Carazo	1:02
8.	"Kingfish"		2:42
9.	"Naked Man"		3:06
10.	"A Wedding in Cherokee County"		3:07
11.	"Back on My Feet Again"		3:30
12.	"Rollin'"		2:53

=== 2002 Reissue ===
Disc one: Good Old Boys

1. "Rednecks"
2. "Birmingham"
3. "Marie"
4. "Mr. President (Have Pity on the Working Man)"
5. "Guilty"
6. "Louisiana 1927"
7. "Every Man a King"
8. "Kingfish"
9. "Naked Man"
10. "A Wedding in Cherokee County"
11. "Back on My Feet Again"
12. "Rollin'"
13. "Marie" (demo, bonus track)

Disc two: Johnny Cutler's Birthday

1. "Rednecks"
2. "If We Didn't Have Jesus"
3. "Birmingham"
4. "The Joke"
5. "Louisiana"
6. "My Daddy Knew Dixie Howell"
7. "Shining"
8. "Marie"
9. "Good Morning"
10. "Birmingham Redux"
11. "Doctor, Doctor"
12. "Albanian Anthem"
13. "Rolling"

== Personnel ==
- Randy Newman – arranger, conductor, piano, Fender Rhodes, ARP, synthesizer, vocals
- Ry Cooder – guitar on "Back on My Feet Again"
- John Platania – electric guitar
- Ron Elliott, Dennis Budimir – acoustic guitar
- Al Perkins – pedal steel guitar
- Red Callender, Russ Titelman, Willie Weeks – bass guitar
- Jim Keltner, Andy Newmark – drums
- Bobbye Hall – percussion
- Milt Holland – drums, percussion
- Glenn Frey – backing vocals
- Don Henley – backing vocals
- Bernie Leadon – backing vocals
- Nick DeCaro – accordion, string arrangements, conductor on "Marie" and "Rollin'"
- Malcolm Cecil, Robert Margouleff – ARP, synthesizer, programming

Technical

- Judy Maizel, Trudy Portch – production coordination
- Lee Herschberg – engineer, mixing
- Donn Landee – additional engineer, mixing
- Mike Salisbury – cover design, photography
- Shepard Sherbell – liner photography
