= Political Science (song) =

1972 song by Randy Newman

Song by Randy Newman

from the album Sail Away
- Released: 1972
- Genre: Rock
- Length: 2:03
- Label: Reprise Records
- Songwriter: Randy Newman
- Producers: Lenny Waronker and Russ Titelman

"Political Science" is a satirical song written and performed by singer-songwriter Randy Newman on his 1972 album, Sail Away.

== Summary ==
In going along with the theme of the rest of the album, the song is a satire of a particular part of American culture and history, namely its foreign policies at the time. The unnamed narrator describes the state of the world, and suggests, "Let’s drop the big one and see what happens."

== Background ==
Newman later said of the song, "I think I got into a character, this sort of jingoistic type of fellow. You know, it isn’t the type of song I wanted to write much of. Not that I didn’t love Tom Lehrer, but I don’t want to be, like Don Henley says, 'What’s this, another novelty song'. And I do write a lot of those, songs that are meant to be funny in a form that listeners take the people in it more seriously than literature."

== Legacy ==
Newman performed the song on The Old Grey Whistle Test in 1972. "Political Science" is prominently performed by Newman on the final credits of the 1999 film Blast from the Past. Newman also rerecorded the song for his 2003 release The Randy Newman Songbook Vol. 1. In October 2006, Newman performed the song on The Colbert Report after being interviewed by Stephen Colbert. On April 16, 2025, Newman performed the song on Everybody's Live with John Mulaney.

Artists including Don Henley, Pedro the Lion, Glen Phillips, Natalie Merchant, and Wilco have performed live covers of this song. The song is also performed in an episode of Ally McBeal by Jennifer Holliday.
