= Louisiana 1927 =

Song performed by Randy Newman

"Louisiana 1927" is a 1974 song written and recorded by Randy Newman on the album Good Old Boys. It tells the story of the Great Mississippi Flood of 1927 which left 700,000 people homeless in Louisiana and Mississippi. In June 2026, CBS News included the song in its list of the 250 essential American songs of the past 250 years.

== Lyrics ==
Sung from the perspective of a nameless resident of the area recounting the flooding of St. Bernard and Plaquemines parishes during the flood, "Louisiana 1927" features lyrics that depict the devastation of the residents of those parishes in the aftermath of the flood. In particular, the narrator lays out the widespread nature of the destruction ("river had busted through clear down to Plaquemines") and the volume of water the flood produced ("six feet of water in the streets of Evangeline"). Also touched upon is the callous response of the federal government, depicted here via a fictional visit from President Calvin Coolidge and "a little fat man," where Coolidge's reaction to the devastation is a detached statement that, "isn't it a shame what the river has done to this poor cracker's land."

In 2005, after Hurricane Katrina, NPR interviewed Newman about the song. He said "I was born in Los Angeles, but I went to New Orleans when I was, like, a week old. My mother is from there, her family is still there. I lived with her a few years when I was a baby, and I'd go back in the summers. And it was the other place that I knew, and I was interested in the history, and heard about this flood, and I wrote the song."

== Music ==
The song is written in the style of a lament, and is performed at a slow tempo. Newman's original version on the album Good Old Boys starts out with strings playing the introduction melody, followed by vocals and piano by Newman with the band. Strings are heard throughout the song.

Newman's self-cover of the song on The Randy Newman Songbook Vol. 1 released in 2003 on the other hand is a simple version with Newman on piano and vocals with no accompaniment.

== Other versions ==
The song became identified with Hurricane Katrina in the public consciousness after being sung by Aaron Neville at NBC's "A Concert for Hurricane Relief", being sung by Newman at the multi-network television fundraiser Shelter from the Storm: A Concert for the Gulf Coast, and a fully orchestrated version of the song performed by Newman during Saturday Night Live's "Mardi Gras Special". A new recording of the orchestrated version is included on the Katrina charity album, Our New Orleans: A Benefit Album for the Gulf Coast, on Nonesuch Records. In 2007, the song was covered by Ray Stevens on his tribute album to New Orleans and Louisiana culture, New Orleans Moon. Singer/pianist Marcia Ball also covered the song at several Katrina benefit concerts. The song also appeared in an episode (S03E7) of HBO's show Treme, sung again by Aaron Neville.

Jolie Holland covered "Louisiana 1927" on Hummingbirds & Helicopters Vol 1: A Benefit for South Texas, a benefit album released after Hurricane Harvey in 2018.
