= Rednecks (song) =

Song by Randy Newman

from the album Good Old Boys
- Language: English
- Released: September 10, 1974
- Genre: Rock, country rock
- Length: 3:07
- Label: Reprise
- Songwriter: Randy Newman
- Producers: Lenny Waronker, Russ Titelman

"Rednecks" is a satirical song by Randy Newman, the lead-off track on his 1974 album Good Old Boys.

== Lyrics and interpretation ==
Last night I saw Lester Maddox on a TV show
With some smart-ass New York Jew
And the Jew laughed at Lester Maddox
And the audience laughed at Lester Maddox too.

"Rednecks" is sung from the perspective of a Southern "redneck". In it, he expresses his dismay at the way that the North looks down upon The South. In particular, the narrator describes his ire at watching a "smart-ass, New York Jew" mock Lester Maddox on a television program. This is an allusion to Maddox's 1970 appearance on The Dick Cavett Show, whose host is actually a gentile from Nebraska. In response to his frustration at the television show, the narrator goes on to list, sarcastically, a litany of negative qualities that Southerners are reputed to have. He focuses especially on institutional racism, or, as the narrator puts it: "keepin' the niggers down."

As the song ends, the narrator criticizes northerners as hypocrites. He achieves this by singing that the "North has set the nigger free", and then claims African Americans are only "free to be put in a cage," before listing a number of black ghettos in northern cities (e.g. Roxbury in Boston, East St. Louis and Harlem in New York City) The verse's final lyric is: "They [the Northerners] gatherin' 'em up, from miles around/Keepin' the niggers down."

Writing in the Los Angeles Times, Randy Lewis said Newman had "peeled back the curtain on... bigots and hypocrites" with this song. In 1995, Newman admitted that he was still nervous performing the song.

A lengthy description of the Cavett broadcast is offered by author Steven Hart in his 2014 essay "He May Be a Fool But He's Our Fool: Lester Maddox, Randy Newman, and the American Culture Wars", which appears in the collection Let the Devil Speak: Articles, Essays, and Incitements. Hart maintains that Cavett was, if anything, too diffident with Maddox, who played word games about the meaning of racism and segregation before "taking theatrical umbrage" and storming off the set only a few minutes before the end of the show. Newman felt differently, saying, "Now, I hate everything that he stands for, but they didn't give him a chance to be an idiot. And here he is, governor of a state—these people elected him in Georgia, however many million people voted for him—and I thought that if I were a Georgian, I would be angry."

Newman later said it was one of many songs he may have, "done differently, in terms of tempo or arrangement. I did 'Rednecks' a little square, maybe."

Steve Earle recorded a cover of "Rednecks" in 2006 for the tribute album Sail Away: The Songs of Randy Newman.

== Newman's opinion ==
Newman has called "Rednecks" one of his favorite compositions. He said he wrote the song after watching Maddox's appearance with Cavett and "seeing him be treated rudely... they had just elected him governor, in a state of 6 million or whatever, and if I were a Georgian, I would have been offended, irrespective of the fact that he was a bigot and a fool."

Newman said that, having written "Rednecks", he felt he had to explain where he was coming from, which led him to write "Marie" and "Birmingham", two other songs that ended up on his Good Old Boys album.

Newman seldom performs "Rednecks" in concert, because it is liberally infused with the word "nigger".
