= Sail Away (Randy Newman song) =

Single by Randy Newman

from the album Sail Away
- Released: 1972
- Genre: Orchestral pop
- Length: 2:56
- Label: Reprise
- Songwriter: Randy Newman
- Producers: Lenny Waronker, Russ Titelman

"Sail Away" is a song by Randy Newman, the title track to his 1972 album. In a 1972 review in Rolling Stone, Stephen Holden describes "Sail Away" as presenting "the American dream of a promised land as it might have been presented to black Africa in slave running days."

== Music ==
The original album recording features an ostinato piano section, played by Newman who also sings vocals, accompanied by a full orchestra.

== Significance ==
"Sail Away" has been widely praised by critics and Newman fans as one of his finest works. It is often cited among the best tracks on one of his best albums. Like many Newman songs, the relative simplicity and "hominess" of the music contrast powerfully with the emotional fortitude of the lyrics. Greil Marcus wrote in his 1975 book Mystery Train: Images of America in Rock 'n' Roll Music that the song is "like a vision of heaven superimposed on hell."

"Sail Away" has been covered by many artists in live performances, notably, Ray Charles, Sonny Terry and Brownie McGhee, Etta James, Frankie Miller, Roseanna Vitro, Bobby Doyle, Linda Ronstadt, Ann Wilson, Dave Van Ronk, Harry Nilsson, and Dave Matthews. On her first solo album, Gladys Knight covered it as part of a medley with Allen Toussaint's song "Freedom for the Stallion", which shares themes of the slave trade.

Bobby Darin covered the song on his last album before he died in 1973, Motown's Bobby Darin. Newman later said, "Bobby Darin could sing, but he did 'Sail Away,' and, well... I don't think he understood it. He did it like was a happy song about coming to America."

Upon its release as a single, Record World said that the song "is simply superb."

In 2011 it was listed at number 268 on Rolling Stone's 500 Greatest Songs of All Time.
