= 1935 United States gubernatorial elections =

Gubernatorial elections in United States

- November 5, 1935; April 21, 1936 (LA)

3 governorships
| | Majority party | Minority party |
|---|---|---|
| Party | Democratic | Republican |
| Seats before | 37 | 9 (Note: Walter Welford (R) succeeded North Dakota Governor Thomas H. Moodie (D) who was disqualified from office in February 1935.) |
| Seats after | 37 | 9 |
| Seat change | Steady | Steady |
| Seats up | 3 | 0 |
| Seats won | 3 | 0 |
- Democratic hold

United States gubernatorial elections were held in 1935, in three states. Kentucky, Louisiana and Mississippi hold their gubernatorial elections in odd numbered years, every 4 years, preceding the United States presidential election year.

== Race summary ==
=== Results ===
| State | Incumbent | Party | First elected | Result | Candidates |
|---|---|---|---|---|---|
| Kentucky | Ruby Laffoon | Democratic | 1931 | Incumbent term-limited. New governor elected. Democratic hold. | ✓ Happy Chandler (Democratic) 54.46%; King Swope (Republican) 45.14%; W. E. Cissna (Prohibition) 0.20%; W. A. Sandefur (Socialist) 0.08%; Herman Horning (Socialist Labor) 0.07%; John J. Thobe (Co-operative Commonwealth) 0.05% |
| Louisiana (Held, 21 April 1936) | James A. Noe | Democratic | 1936 (Note: Noe took office after his predecessor (Oscar K. Allen) died.) | Incumbent retired. New governor elected. Democratic hold. | ✓ Richard W. Leche (Democratic); Unopposed |
| Mississippi | Martin Sennet Conner | Democratic | 1931 | Incumbent term-limited. New governor elected. Democratic hold. | ✓ Hugh L. White (Democratic); Unopposed |
