= Twelve Songs =

Twelve Songs or 12 Songs may refer to:

- Twelve Songs, Op. 21, by Sergei Rachmaninoff
- 12 Songs (Randy Newman album), a 1970 album by Randy Newman
- 12 Songs (Neil Diamond album), a 2005 album by Neil Diamond
- 12 Songs, a 2006 album by Cory Branan
