= Happy Chandler =

American politician and baseball commissioner (1898–1991)

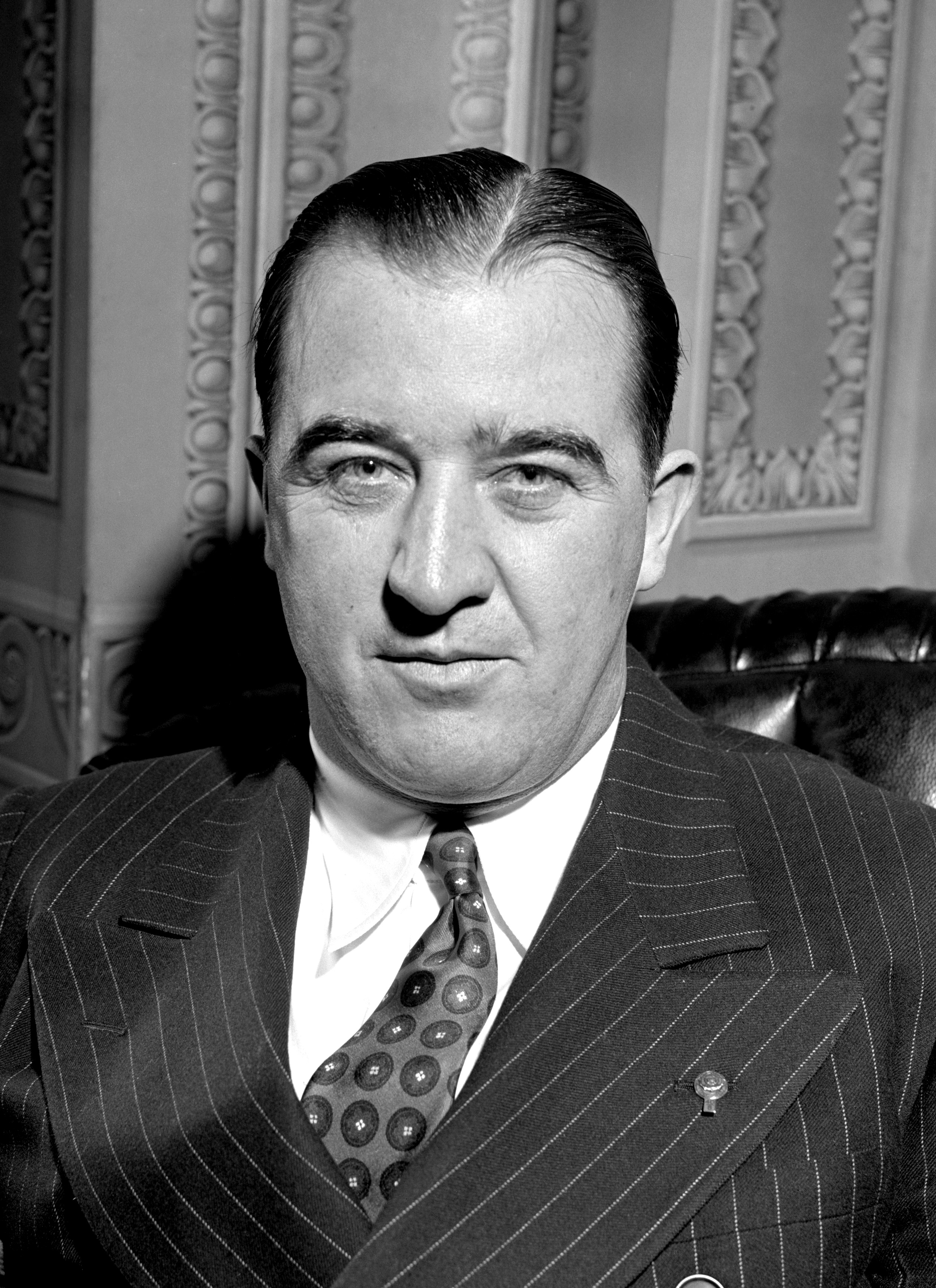
- Chandler in 1940

44th and 49th Governor of Kentucky
- In office December 13, 1955 – December 8, 1959
- Lieutenant: Harry Lee Waterfield
- Preceded by: Lawrence Wetherby
- Succeeded by: Bert Combs
- In office December 10, 1935 – October 9, 1939
- Lieutenant: Keen Johnson
- Preceded by: Ruby Laffoon
- Succeeded by: Keen Johnson

2nd Commissioner of Baseball
- In office November 1, 1945 – July 15, 1951
- Preceded by: Kenesaw Mountain Landis
- Succeeded by: Ford Frick

United States Senator from Kentucky
- In office October 10, 1939 – November 1, 1945
- Preceded by: M. M. Logan
- Succeeded by: William A. Stanfill

36th Lieutenant Governor of Kentucky
- In office December 8, 1931 – December 10, 1935
- Governor: Ruby Laffoon
- Preceded by: James Breathitt Jr.
- Succeeded by: Keen Johnson

Member of the Kentucky Senate from the 22nd district
- In office January 1, 1930 – December 8, 1931
- Preceded by: Clarence O. Graves
- Succeeded by: Drake K. Naive

Personal details
- Born: Albert Benjamin Chandler; July 14, 1898 Corydon, Kentucky, U.S.
- Died: June 15, 1991 (aged 92) Versailles, Kentucky, U.S.
- Resting place: Pisgah Presbyterian Cemetery, Versailles, Kentucky
- Party: Democratic
- Other political affiliations: Independent (1971)
- Spouse: Mildred Lucille Watkins (m. 1925)
- Children: 4, including Mimi Chandler
- Relatives: Ben Chandler (grandson)
- Education: Transylvania University (BA); Harvard University (dropped out); University of Kentucky (LLB)
- Occupation: Politician; lawyer

Military service
- Allegiance: United States
- Branch/service: United States Army
- Years of service: 1918–1919
- Battles/wars: World War I
- Baseball career

Member of the National

Baseball Hall of Fame
- Induction: 1982
- Election method: Veterans Committee

Albert Benjamin "Happy" Chandler Sr. (July 14, 1898 – June 15, 1991) was an American politician from Kentucky. He represented Kentucky in the U.S. Senate and served as its 44th and 49th governor. Aside from his political positions, he also served as the second commissioner of baseball from 1945 to 1951 and was inducted into the Baseball Hall of Fame in 1982. His grandson, Ben Chandler, later served as US Representative for Kentucky's sixth district.

A multi-sport athlete during his college days at Transylvania College, Chandler briefly considered a career in professional baseball before deciding to pursue a law degree. After graduation, he entered politics and was elected as a Democrat to the Kentucky Senate in 1929. Two years later, he was elected 36th lieutenant governor, serving under Governor Ruby Laffoon.

Chandler and Laffoon disagreed on the issue of instituting a state sales tax and when Chandler, the presiding officer in the state senate, worked to block the legislation, Laffoon's allies in the General Assembly stripped him of many of his statutory powers. The tax then passed by a narrow margin. Knowing that Laffoon would try to select his own successor at the Democratic nominating convention, Chandler waited until Laffoon left the state—leaving Chandler as acting governor—and called the legislature into session to enact a mandatory primary election bill. The bill passed, and in the ensuing primary, Chandler defeated Laffoon's choice, Thomas Rhea. He then went on to defeat Republican King Swope by the largest margin of victory for a Kentucky gubernatorial race at that time.

As governor, Chandler oversaw the repeal of the sales tax, replacing the lost revenue with new excise taxes and the state's first income tax. He also enacted a major reorganization of state government, realizing significant savings for the state. He used these savings to pay off the state debt and improve the state's education and transportation systems.

Convinced that he was destined to become President of the United States, Chandler challenged Senate Majority Leader Alben Barkley for his U.S. Senate seat in 1938. During the campaign, President Franklin D. Roosevelt came to the state to campaign for Barkley, and Chandler lost a close race. The following year, Kentucky's other senator, Marvel Mills Logan, died in office, and Chandler resigned as governor so his successor could appoint him to the vacant seat.

A fiscal conservative and disciple of Virginia's Harry F. Byrd, Chandler opposed parts of Roosevelt's New Deal and openly disagreed with the president's decision to prioritize European operations in World War II over the war in the Pacific.

In 1945, Chandler resigned his Senate seat to succeed the late Kenesaw Mountain Landis as commissioner of baseball. His most significant action as commissioner was the approval of Jackie Robinson's contract with the Brooklyn Dodgers, effectively integrating Major League Baseball. He also established the first pension fund for Major League players, earning him the title "the players' commissioner". Baseball owners were upset with Chandler's governance, however, and did not renew his contract in 1951.

Following his term as commissioner, Chandler returned to Kentucky and won a second term as governor in 1955. The major accomplishments of his second term were enforcing the racial integration of the state's public schools and establishing a medical school at the University of Kentucky, later named the Chandler Medical Center in his honor.

Following his second term as governor, his political influence began to wane as he made three more unsuccessful runs for governor in 1963, 1967, and 1971. His endorsement of dark-horse candidate Wallace G. Wilkinson was seen as critical to Wilkinson's successful gubernatorial campaign in 1987. Wilkinson later resisted calls to remove Chandler from the University of Kentucky board of trustees following Chandler's use of a racial epithet during a board meeting in 1988.

In his retirement, Chandler made numerous public appearances and remained active in state politics and events. Chandler died at the age of 92 years, 11 months; at the time, he was the oldest living former Kentucky governor as well as the earliest-serving former governor.

== Early life ==
Albert Benjamin Chandler was born in the farming community of Corydon, Kentucky, in 1898. He was the eldest child of Joseph Sweet and Callie (Saunders) Chandler. Chandler's father allegedly rescued his mother from an orphanage and married her when she was 15, but no record of their marriage has ever been found. In 1899, Chandler's brother Robert was born. Two years later, their mother, still in her teens and unable to cope with raising two young children, abandoned the family. She fled the state and left her sons with their father. In his autobiography, Chandler said that his mother's leaving them was his earliest memory. Years later, he sought his mother and found her living in Jacksonville, Florida. She had married again and he had three half-siblings. His full brother, Robert Chandler, died when he fell from a cherry tree when he was 13 years old.

Chandler was raised by his father and relatives, and by age eight, he virtually supported himself financially from his paper route and doing odd jobs in his community. In 1917, he graduated from Corydon High School, where he had been captain of the baseball and football teams. His father wanted him to study for the ministry, but Chandler instead entered Transylvania College (now Transylvania University) in Lexington, Kentucky. It was there that he received his lifelong nickname "Happy" because of his jovial nature. He paid for his education by doing chores for the local citizens. Chandler was captain of Transylvania's basketball and baseball teams and the quarterback of the football team. He was a teammate of Dutch Meyer, a future member of the College Football Hall of Fame. He also joined the Pi Kappa Alpha fraternity and the Omicron Delta Kappa honor society. In 1918, during World War I, the United States Army started a Student Officers' Training Corps at Transylvania, and Chandler began training to be an officer. The war ended before he was called to active duty.

In 1920, Chandler pitched a no-hitter for Grafton, North Dakota's team in the Red River Valley League. He attended a professional baseball tryout in Saskatoon but did not make the team. He returned to Transylvania and received a Bachelor of Arts degree in June 1921. He then signed with the Class D baseball team the Lexington Reds, where he was a teammate of future Hall of Famer Earle Combs. Briefly considering a career in baseball, he finally decided to study law. He entered Harvard Law School that same year, paying his way by coaching high school sports in Wellesley, Massachusetts. His former teammate Charlie Moran, then coaching the Centre College Praying Colonels football team in Danville, Kentucky, asked him to scout the national powerhouse Harvard Crimson, an upcoming opponent for Centre. Chandler took copious notes for Moran, and Centre defeated Harvard 6–0 in what is considered one of the greatest upsets in college football history.

After a year, Chandler was not able to afford Harvard. He returned to Kentucky and continued at the University of Kentucky College of Law, coaching high school sports in Versailles and serving as the head coach of the women's basketball team at the University of Kentucky in 1923. He was an assistant coach and scout for Charlie Moran at Centre College and coached the freshman football team there. A member of the Order of the Coif, he received his Bachelor of Laws degree in 1924. He was admitted to the bar the following year and opened his law practice in Versailles.

On November 12, 1925, Chandler married Mildred Lucille Watkins, a teacher at the Margaret Hall School for Girls. They had four children: Marcella, Mildred ("Mimi"), Albert Jr., and Joseph Daniel. Mimi Chandler played one of the four singing sisters in the 1944 film And the Angels Sing, appearing with Dorothy Lamour, Betty Hutton, and Diana Lynn before abandoning acting and working for the Kentucky Department of Tourism.

For the next five years, Chandler simultaneously practiced law, coached high school sports, and served as a scout for Centre College. He joined numerous fraternal organizations, including the Freemasons, Shriners, Knights Templar, Forty and Eight, and Optimist International.

== Early political career ==
Chandler entered politics when he was named chairman of the Woodford County Democratic Committee. In 1928, he was appointed master commissioner of the Woodford County circuit court. The following year, he was elected as a Democrat to represent the 22nd district in the Kentucky Senate. As a member of the Senate, he was part of a Democratic coalition that passed legislation to strip Republican governor Flem D. Sampson of many of his statutory powers.

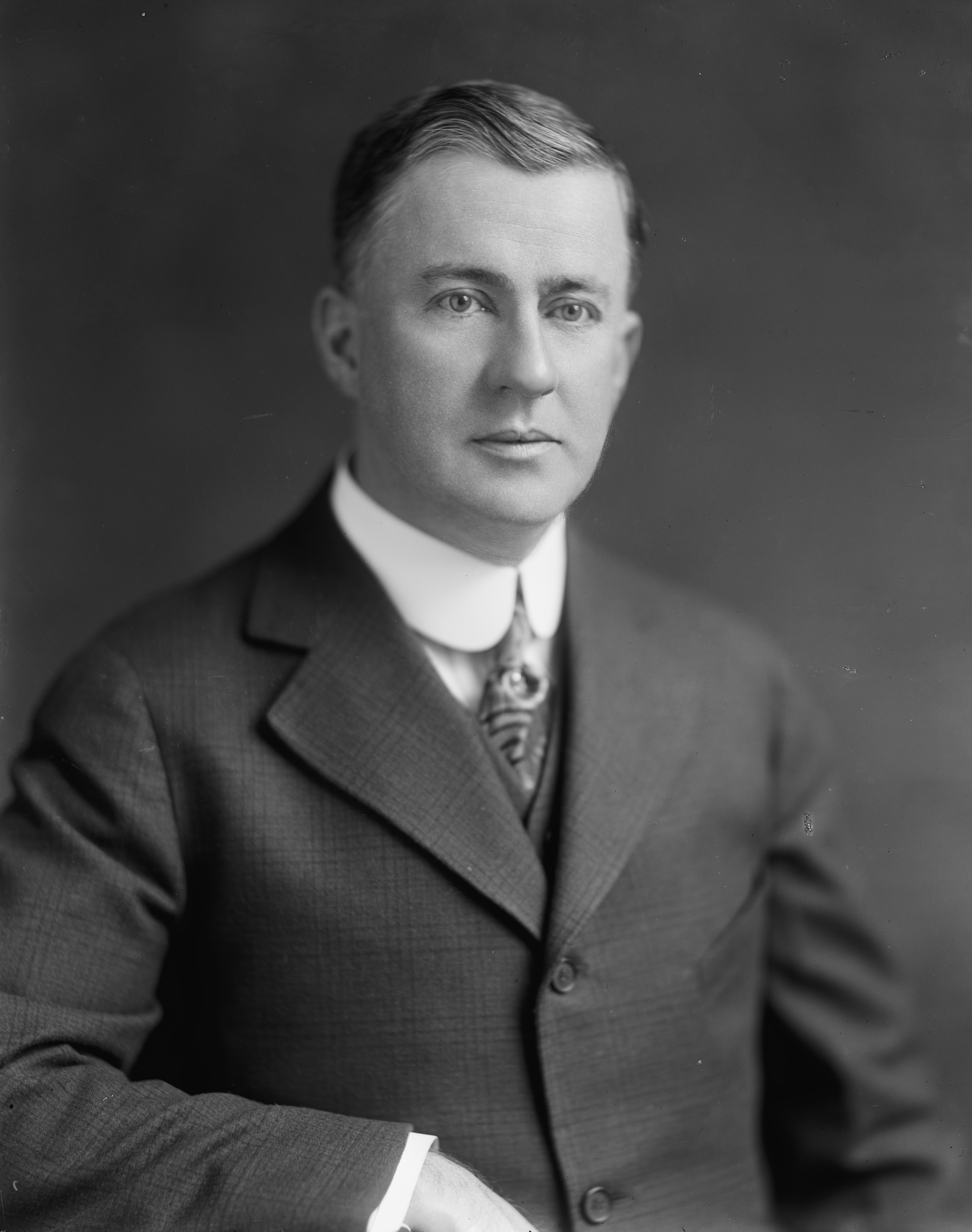
Former Governor J. C. W. Beckham was one of Chandler's allies in his early political career.

As the 1931 gubernatorial election approached, Chandler and Prestonsburg native Jack Howard were mentioned as candidates for lieutenant governor. US Representative Fred M. Vinson backed Howard, a fellow Eastern Kentuckian, but political bosses Billy Klair, Johnson N. Camden Jr., and Ben Johnson supported Chandler. The support of another political boss, Mickey Brennan, gave Chandler the edge at the party's nominating convention. Democratic gubernatorial nominee Ruby Laffoon also owed his selection to the machinations of the state's political bosses, notably his uncle, Representative Polk Laffoon. Problematically, Chandler was an ally of former governor J. C. W. Beckham, Louisville Courier-Journal publisher Robert Worth Bingham, and political boss Percy Haly, which put him at odds with Laffoon, a member of a Democratic faction that was headed by Russellville political boss Thomas Rhea and opposed to Beckham, Worth, and Haly. Despite the disharmony within the ticket, the worsening of the Great Depression under Republican president Herbert Hoover and Governor Sampson ensured a Democratic victory. Chandler was elected over John C. Worsham, by a vote of 426,247 to 353,573. In a break with precedent, Chandler set up an office on the executive floor of the state capitol and worked there full-time. Previous lieutenant governors had stayed in Frankfort only during legislative sessions, when they were charged with presiding over the State Senate.

Shortly after their election, the divide between Chandler and Laffoon widened over the issue of implementing a state sales tax. Laffoon favored the tax, but Chandler opposed it. As presiding officer of the state senate, Chandler worked with House Speaker John Y. Brown Sr., to block passage of the tax. In retaliation, Laffoon's allies in the Kentucky General Assembly stripped Chandler of some of his statutory power as lieutenant governor, and they were then able to pass the tax by a single vote in each house of the legislature.

Chandler laid groundwork to succeed Laffoon as governor, almost from the beginning of his term as lieutenant governor. Laffoon, however, had made it clear that he favored Thomas Rhea to be his successor. Rhea secured the services of rising political boss Earle C. Clements as his campaign manager. Hailing from Morganfield, a short distance from Chandler's hometown of Corydon, Clements later said that if Chandler had asked him first, he might have managed Chandler's campaign, instead of Rhea's. Instead, by the virtue of managing the opposing campaign, Clements became the leader of a Democratic faction that opposed Chandler for the next three decades.

Chandler feared that Laffoon, who controlled the State Democratic Central Committee, would attempt to handpick the Democratic gubernatorial nominee by calling a nominating convention instead of holding a primary election and so Chandler used a bold move to circumvent Laffoon's ability to carry out such an action. Under the Kentucky Constitution, Chandler became acting governor when Laffoon left the state. When Laffoon traveled to meet with President Franklin Roosevelt in Washington, DC, on February 6, 1935, Chandler used his authority to call the legislature into session to consider a bill that required each party's gubernatorial candidates to be chosen by a primary, rather than a nominating convention. Laffoon returned to the Kentucky the next day and challenged Chandler's authority to make the call, but Chandler's actions would be validated by the Kentucky Court of Appeals on February 26.

Laffoon knew that the primary bill would be widely supported in the General Assembly since both the legislators and their constituents had grown to distrust party nominating conventions. Accordingly, he proposed a bill enacting a mandatory two-stage primary in which a runoff election would be held between the top two candidates in the first round. Historian Lowell H. Harrison maintained that Laffoon expected his rival faction to nominate the aging Beckham to oppose Rhea and that Laffoon hoped that a two-stage primary would wear Beckham down. Journalist John Ed Pearce, however, contends that Beckham had already declined to become a candidate, citing his own ill health and that of his son, before the special session convened. Whatever the case, the legislature passed the bill that Laffoon proposed.

== First term as governor ==
After Beckham declined to run for governor, the anti-Laffoon faction supported Chandler against Rhea. During the primary campaign, Chandler seized upon the unpopular sales tax, labeling Rhea "Sales Tax Tom" and called on the electorate to redeem the state from "Ruby, Rhea, and Ruin". In the first round of the primary, Rhea garnered 203,010 votes to Chandler's 189,575. Frederick A. Wallis received 38,410 votes, and Elam Huddleston received 15,501. The votes for Wallis and Huddleston meant that neither Rhea nor Chandler had achieved a majority, which triggered the runoff primary. Both Wallis and Huddleston backed Chandler in the runoff, and Chandler defeated Rhea, by 26,449 votes, to secure the nomination.

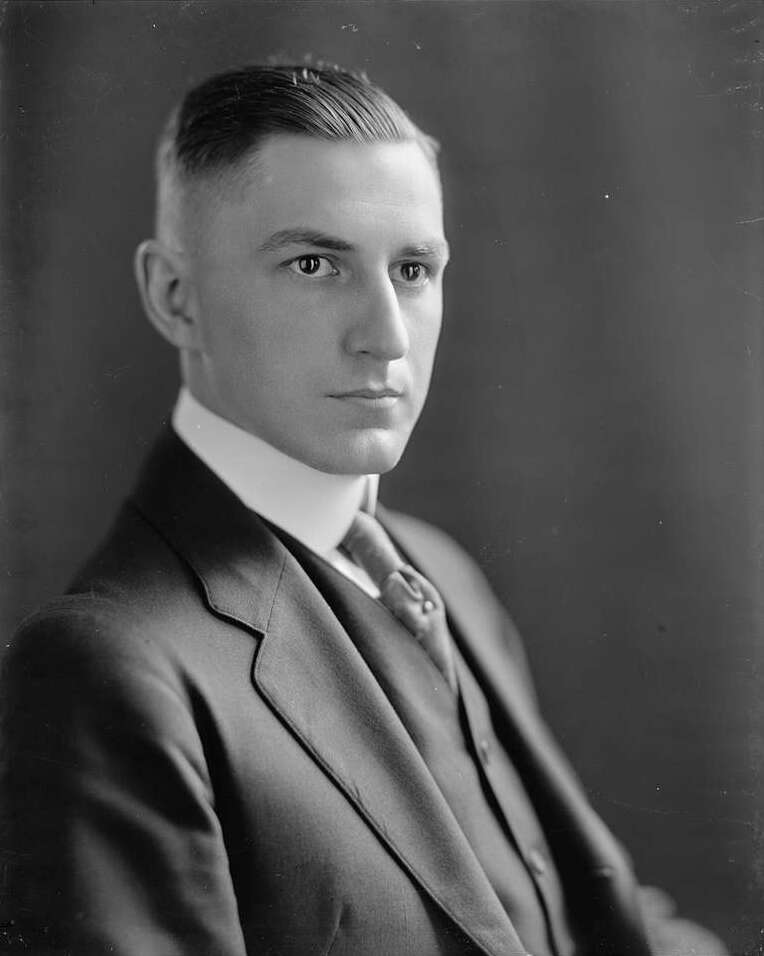
King Swope lost his gubernatorial bid to Chandler in 1935.

Chandler promised to repeal the unpopular sales tax, lower the gasoline tax, oppose any increase in property taxes, and end the common practice of assessing state employees a percentage of their salaries to be used for campaign activities. Infuriated by their loss, Laffoon and his allies abandoned the party and supported the Republican nominee, King Swope. Policy-wise, there were few differences between the two, and both launched personal attacks. Swope's reputation as a stern judge contrasted sharply with Chandler's charisma, and Chandler used that to his advantage by dubbing Swope "his majesty". When Chandler touted his service during World War I, Laffoon's adjutant general Henry Denhardt countered by pointing out that Chandler had been only a cadet in training and never had engaged in active service in the war. Ultimately, the campaign turned on the failed presidential administration of the Republican ex-president Hoover and that of the sitting president, the Democratic Roosevelt. Chandler defeated Swope by 95,158 votes in the general election; his margin of victory was then the largest ever recorded in a Kentucky gubernatorial election, and at only 37, Chandler was the youngest governor of any US state.

One of Chandler's first acts as governor was to secure the repeal of the sales tax passed under Laffoon. He successfully lobbied the legislature to abolish the two-round primary, in favor of a single primary for future elections. Knowing that he would need to raise revenue to offset the repeal of the sales tax and bring the state's expenditures in line with its income, Chandler appointed a commission headed by ex-Governor Beckham to draft suggested budgetary legislation. Knowing that lobbyists would likely encourage legislative gridlock until the end of the 60-day session, Chandler asked his allies in the general assembly to adjourn after 39 days to give him time to call a special legislative session, not time-limited and focused on his agenda. Legislators obliged this request.

On recommendations from Beckham's commission, legislators helped offset the lost revenue from the sales tax by raising excise taxes, particularly the tax on whiskey, made possible by the repeal of prohibition in Kentucky in 1935. Legislators also enacted Kentucky's first income tax during the session. Chandler proposed additional savings through the Governmental Reorganization Act of 1936. The bill saved funds by restructuring state government and reducing the number of boards and commissions in the executive branch from 133 to 22. Critics pointed out that the act also centralized more power in the hands of the governor and accused Chandler of ulterior motives in supporting the act.

Chandler used savings from restructuring state offices to eliminate Kentucky's budget deficit and pay off most of its debt. This brought more savings by eliminating debt service costs, which were then applied to improvements in Kentucky's infrastructure and educational institutions. Chandler allocated funds to provide free textbooks for Kentucky's schoolchildren and implemented several other reforms including the creation of a teacher's pension fund and extensive funding for the state's colleges and universities.

Because racial segregation prevented Black students from attending graduate school in Kentucky, Chandler secured an allocation of $5,000 annually to provide out-of-state tuition. Chandler stopped short of desegregating Kentucky's universities and told a group of educators that "it is not wise to educate the white and colored in the same school in the South. It is not prepared for it yet."

In 1939, Chandler appointed the first woman trustee on the University of Kentucky Board of Trustees, Georgia M. Blazer of Ashland. She served from 1939 to 1960.

In 1936, Chandler urged implementation of Kentucky's first rural roads program and development of electrical infrastructure with assistance from the federal Rural Electrification Act. He implemented an old-age assistance program authorized by an earlier constitutional amendment, and in 1938, he proposed another amendment that would add dependent children and needy blind people to the state's assistance rolls. Chandler increased funding to the state's hospitals and asylums, and he personally aided with the evacuation of the Frankfort Penitentiary during the Ohio River flood of 1937. Following the flood, Chandler convinced the legislature to construct the new Kentucky State Reformatory, at La Grange.

Generally a friend of organized labor, Chandler supported miners' efforts to unionize, organized the state Department of Industrial Relations, and prohibited mine operators from being appointed as deputy sheriffs. He also endorsed the proposed Child Labor Amendment to the US Constitution and secured passage of a state anti-child-labor law that had been defeated twice in the state legislature by overwhelming margins. However, he opposed closed shops and sitdown strikes, and he used the Kentucky National Guard to quell labor-related violence in Harlan County.

In the 1936 US Senate contest in Kentucky, incumbent Democrat Marvel Mills Logan was seen as vulnerable, and Chandler backed Democratic challenger J. C. W. Beckham in the Democratic primary. That endorsement drew the ire of Chandler's former ally, Democratic representative John Y. Brown Sr., who believed that in exchange for his support of Chandler in the 1935 gubernatorial race, Chandler would support him in the senatorial contest. An embittered Brown entered the race anyway, and the votes that he pulled from Beckham likely allowed Logan to retain the seat. Brown remained Chandler's political enemy for the rest of his political career.

In 1936, Chandler was awarded an honorary Doctor of Laws degree from the University of Kentucky. The following year, Harvard University awarded him the same degree.

== United States Senator ==
=== Aspirations ===
Both Robert Bingham and Percy Haly died in 1937. With J. C. W. Beckham aging (he would die in 1940), Chandler moved to fill the leadership void in the faction. He soon came to believe he was destined to become President of the United States. In mid-1937, he began advocating for Marvel Mills Logan, Kentucky's junior senator, to be appointed to the US Supreme Court, creating a Senate vacancy to which Chandler, as governor, could appoint himself. The retirement of Justice George Sutherland in January 1938 gave President Franklin Roosevelt the opportunity to accommodate Chandler's wishes, but Roosevelt preferred younger justices (Logan was 63), and Kentucky's senior senator, Alben Barkley, recommended Solicitor General Stanley Forman Reed for the appointment. Roosevelt heeded Barkley's advice and appointed Reed instead of Logan.

Eager to augment his power and angered by the refusal of Roosevelt and Barkley to accept his suggestion of appointing Logan to the Supreme Court, Chandler did not attend a long-planned dinner in Barkley's honor on January 22, 1938. Instead, he held an event of his own at Louisville's exclusive Pendennis Club and alluded to his intentions of challenging Barkley during the upcoming Democratic senatorial primary. Barkley officially announced his re-election bid the following day. The death of another federal judge on January 26 provided a second opportunity for Roosevelt to appoint Senator Logan to a judgeship and appease Chandler, but Logan refused to consider the appointment. Following a January 31 meeting in Washington, DC, between Roosevelt and Chandler, in which Roosevelt urged Chandler to put his senatorial ambitions on hold, Chandler was encouraged by his political mentor, Virginia's Harry F. Byrd, to challenge Barkley. Chandler heeded Byrd's advice by making an official announcement of his candidacy on February 23, 1938, in Newport, Kentucky.

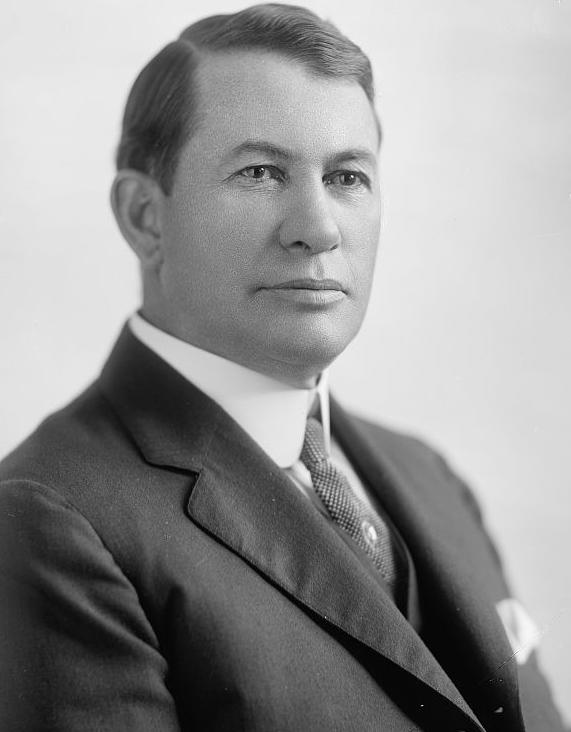
Alben Barkley retained his US Senate seat in 1938 despite a challenge from Chandler.

Barkley, who had been recently chosen as Senate Majority Leader by a single vote, was a strong supporter of Roosevelt and the New Deal. Chandler identified with the more conservative southern Democrats, who were wary of Roosevelt and sought to gain control of the party ahead of the 1940 presidential election. Because Roosevelt was very popular in Kentucky, Chandler was put in the awkward position of expressing personal support of the president and opposing his handpicked leader in the Senate and his New Deal legislation. In April, polls showed Barkley ahead of Chandler by a 2-to-1 margin, and the May 3 primary victory of Florida Senator Claude Pepper, who supported the New Deal, finally persuaded Chandler to abandon his attacks of the program.

In late May 1938, Chandler's campaign manager publicly claimed that federal relief agencies, especially the Works Progress Administration, were openly working for Barkley's re-election. Although the WPA administrator in Kentucky denied the charges, veteran reporter Thomas Lunsford Stokes launched an investigation of the agency's activities in the state and eventually raised 22 charges of political corruption in a series of eight articles, covering the Barkley-Chandler campaign. Federal WPA administrator Harry Hopkins claimed an internal investigation of the agency refuted all but two of Stokes' charges, but Stokes was awarded the Pulitzer Prize for Reporting in 1939 for his investigation. In the wake of the investigation Congress passed the Hatch Act of 1939 to limit the WPA's involvement in future elections.

The negative effects of the investigation on Barkley's campaign were minimal because of Chandler's own use of his gubernatorial power and patronage on behalf of his own campaign. Dan Talbott, one of Chandler's chief political advisors, encouraged supervisors of state workers to take punitive action against employees who made "pessimistic expressions" on Chandler's chances in the primary. Furthermore, Chandler initiated a rural road-building project in the state, employing loyal supporters to construct and maintain the new roads. State workers who supported Chandler were employed to deliver pension checks to the state's elderly citizens, and Talbott did not deny charges that the workers threatened to withhold the checks if the recipients did not pledge their support to Chandler.

Roosevelt personally visited Kentucky to campaign on Barkley's behalf on July 8, 1938. As governor of the state, Chandler was on hand to greet Roosevelt on his arrival in Covington. Seeking to benefit from being nearest to the president, Chandler sat between Roosevelt and Barkley in the back seat of the open-topped vehicle that transported them to Latonia Race Track, the site of Roosevelt's first speech. Throughout his tour of the state, Roosevelt endorsed Barkley but remained friendly with Chandler. After Roosevelt's departure, Chandler played up Roosevelt's complimentary remarks about him but downplayed or ignored critical remarks.

Late in the campaign, Chandler fell ill with chills, stomach pains, and a high fever. After first claiming the symptoms were similar to those that he had experienced a year earlier, Chandler later described his malady as "intestinal poisoning". His doctor announced that Chandler, Dan Talbott, and a state police officer had all been sickened after drinking "poisoned water" that had been provided to Chandler for a radio address. Chandler maintained that someone from the Barkley campaign had tried to poison him, but the charge never gained much credence with the press or the electorate. Barkley frequently mocked it on the campaign trail by first accepting a glass of water offered to him and then shuddering and rejecting it. He pointed out to audiences that it was the young Chandler and not Barkley who had broken down first under the strain of the grueling campaign.

With Chandler ally Robert Bingham no longer at its helm, The Courier-Journal supported Barkley, and organized labor, a key Chandler supporter in 1935, also threw its support to Barkley. Former Chandler ally John Y. Brown Sr. also took an active part in the Barkley campaign. Ultimately, Barkley defeated Chandler by 70,872 votes. The remaining 1.4% of the vote was divided among minor candidates.

=== Appointment and tenure ===
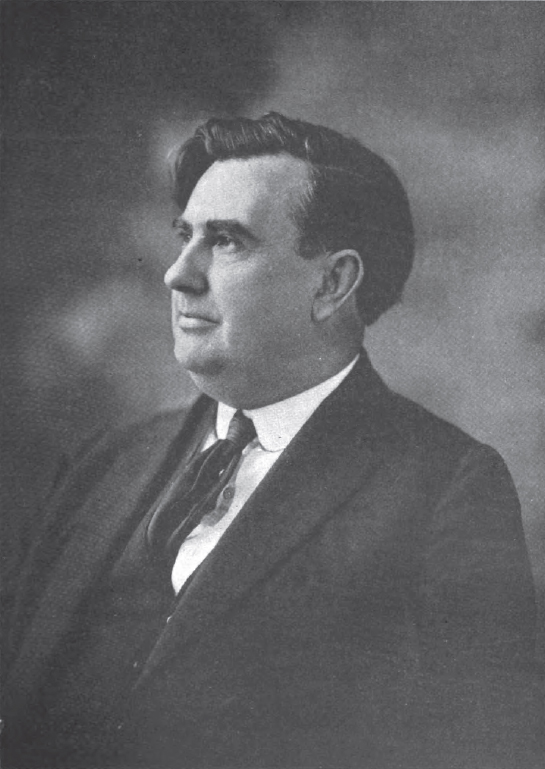
Logan's death in 1939 created a vacancy in the US Senate to which Chandler was appointed.

On October 9, 1939, following the death of Senator Logan, Chandler resigned as governor, elevating Lieutenant Governor Keen Johnson to the governorship. The following day, Johnson appointed Chandler to Logan's vacated seat in the Senate. In a special election to fill the remainder of the unexpired term, Chandler then first defeated Charles R. Farnsley in the Democratic primary and Republican Walter B. Smith by 159,339 votes in the November 5, 1940, general election. Although he never forgave Roosevelt for backing Barkley in the 1938 senatorial primary, he generally supported the Roosevelt administration except for parts of the New Deal.

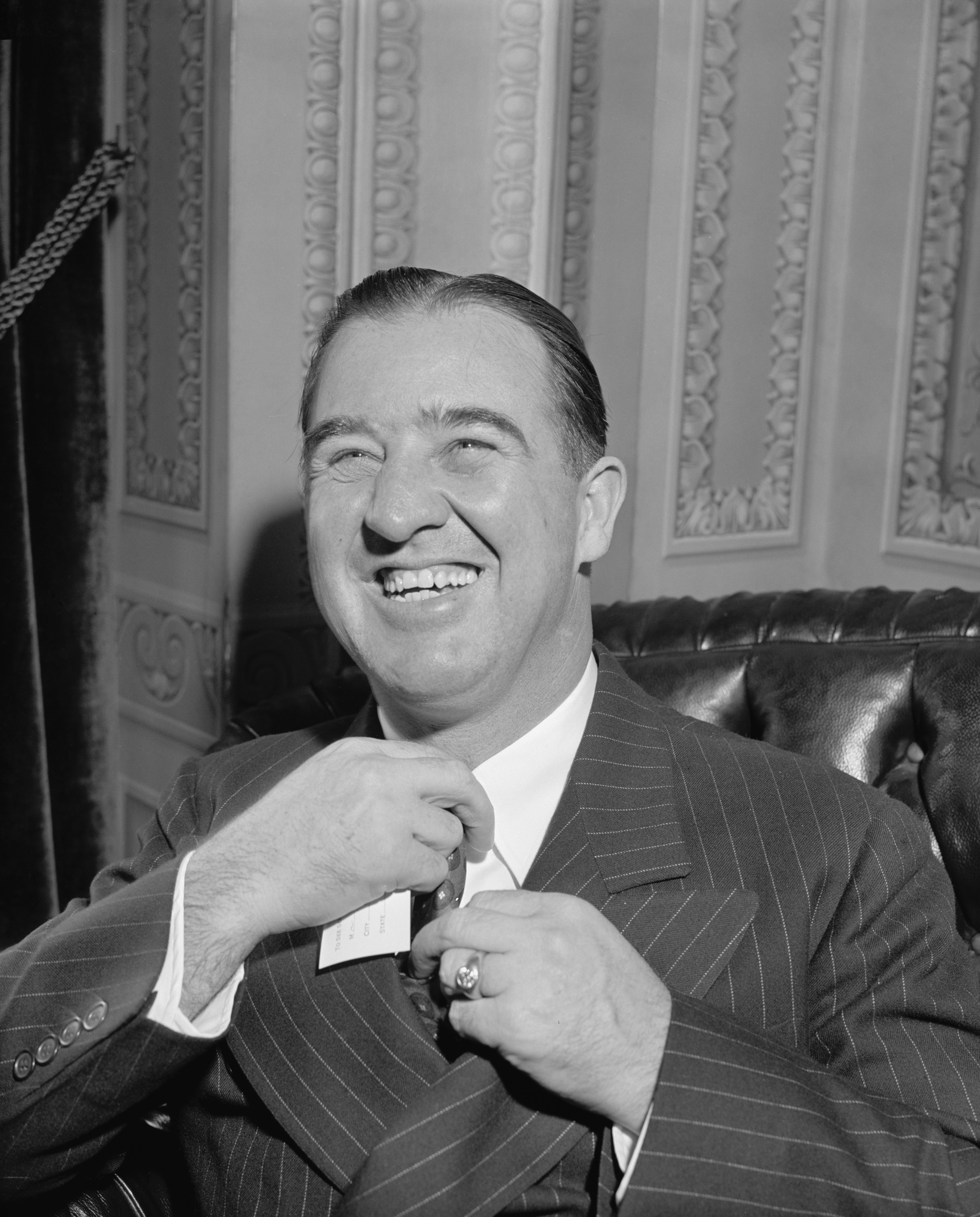
Chandler as senator in May 1940.

Chandler's mentor, Harry F. Byrd, led a group of Southern conservatives in the Senate, and through Byrd's influence, Chandler was appointed to the Committee on Military Affairs. In 1943, he was part of a five-person delegation from the Military Affairs Committee that traveled the world, inspecting US military bases. He vociferously disagreed with Roosevelt's decision to prioritize the European Theatre in World War II over the Pacific Theatre.

Chandler upset many in the black community by voting against an anti-lynching bill soon after taking office. The bill levied fines against local governments and individual government officials in counties in which illegal lynchings had occurred. Of his vote against the bill, Chandler remarked, "I am against lynching by anybody and of anybody, black or white, but the present bill carries penalties on local officials and local subdivisions which I think are too severe." The bill passed in the House of Representatives but died in the Senate. Later, Chandler joined with Southern senators in opposing the repeal of poll taxes, which had been long used as a mechanism to prevent blacks from voting.

At the expiration of his partial term in 1942, Chandler faced a challenge from former ally John Y. Brown Sr. in the Democratic primary. As a result of his votes on the anti-lynching bill and the poll tax repeal, the Louisville chapter of the National Association for the Advancement of Colored People worked against his re-election effort. During the campaign, Brown accused Chandler of abusing his power, including of having a swimming pool installed at his home, in violation of the federal rationing provisions that had been implemented during World War II. Chandler invited the Truman Committee to investigate the installation of the pool and no violations of the federal rationing provisions were found. Chandler went on to defeat Brown and was easily re-elected in the general election over Republican Richard J. Colbert.

Chandler believed that he had enough support at the 1944 Democratic National Convention to be nominated as Roosevelt's running mate for that year's presidential election. The support failed to materialize, however, after the Kentucky delegation, Earle C. Clements in particular, refused to back his nomination. The convention nominated Harry Truman as Roosevelt's running mate. Truman became president upon Roosevelt's death in 1945, and Chandler never forgave Clements for costing him the chance to be US president.

== Commissioner of baseball ==
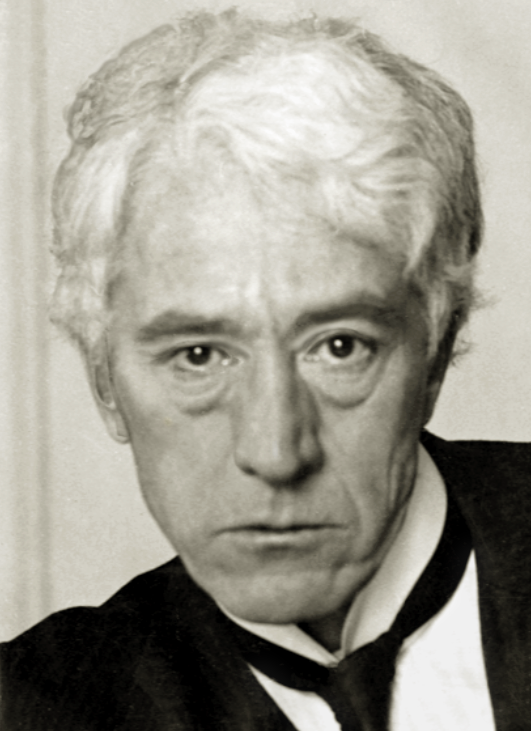
Kenesaw Mountain Landis, Chandler's predecessor as Baseball Commissioner.

After the death of baseball commissioner Kenesaw Mountain Landis in November 1944, John O. Gottlieb, a friend of Chandler in the US War Department, suggested Chandler as a successor. Baseball owners who had been afraid that their players would be made eligible for the draft during the war had decided that their new commissioner needed to have the skills and influence to represent baseball's interests in Washington, D C. As a senator, Chandler had advocated on behalf of baseball during the war, which endeared him to the owners. Furthermore, the commissioner's $50,000 annual salary, about five times that of a US senator at the time, proved a significant enticement and so he agreed to be considered.

Other candidates being considered included National League President Ford Frick (who would succeed Chandler as commissioner in 1951), Democratic National Committee Chairman Robert E. Hannegan, former Postmaster General James Farley, US senator John W. Bricker, FBI Director J. Edgar Hoover, former federal Judge Fred M. Vinson, Ohio Governor Frank Lausche, and Undersecretary of War Robert P. Patterson. After Cincinnati Reds president Warren Giles and Chicago Cubs owner Philip K. Wrigley raised strong opposition to Frick, who had been the frontrunner, New York Yankees co-owner Larry MacPhail began to advocate for Chandler. When the owners met in Cleveland, Ohio, on April 24, 1945, to vote for a new commissioner, Chandler's name was not on the shortlist, which had Frick, Farley, Hannegan, Vinson, Lausche, and Patterson. None of the candidates received the required two-thirds majority, and after lobbying by MacPhail and New York Giants owner Horace Stoneham, the owners took an informal vote to see if anyone had the potential to be elected. Chandler's name appeared in the top three on each of the sixteen ballots. Encouraged, the owners then held another formal vote. After two ballots, Chandler received the necessary majority. A third vote was taken to make the choice unanimous.

Chandler remained in the Senate for several months after his election as commissioner because he wanted to cast his vote on the Bretton Woods Monetary Agreement and the Charter of the United Nations. He received only his Senate salary until his resignation on November 1, 1945, despite claims to the contrary by the press. Nevertheless, his delay in assuming the commissioner's job upset many team owners, as did his late arrival to Game 3 of the 1945 World Series, which rendered him unavailable to rule on whether the weather was clement enough to begin the game. Many owners believed Chandler had been attending a political meeting, but he had actually been at a Detroit Athletic Club luncheon, where he was representing Major League Baseball.

Chandler's election was also met with disdain from much of the press in the Eastern United States, where most of baseball's teams resided at that time. His Southern drawl and his willingness to sing "My Old Kentucky Home" with very little encouragement led some sportswriters to opine that he was too undignified for the office. Others resented his folksy, political style, calling him "a preening politician", "the Kentucky windbag", and "a hand-shaking baby-kissing practitioner of the arts". Chandler further alienated the press by moving the commissioner's office to Cincinnati from Chicago in 1946.

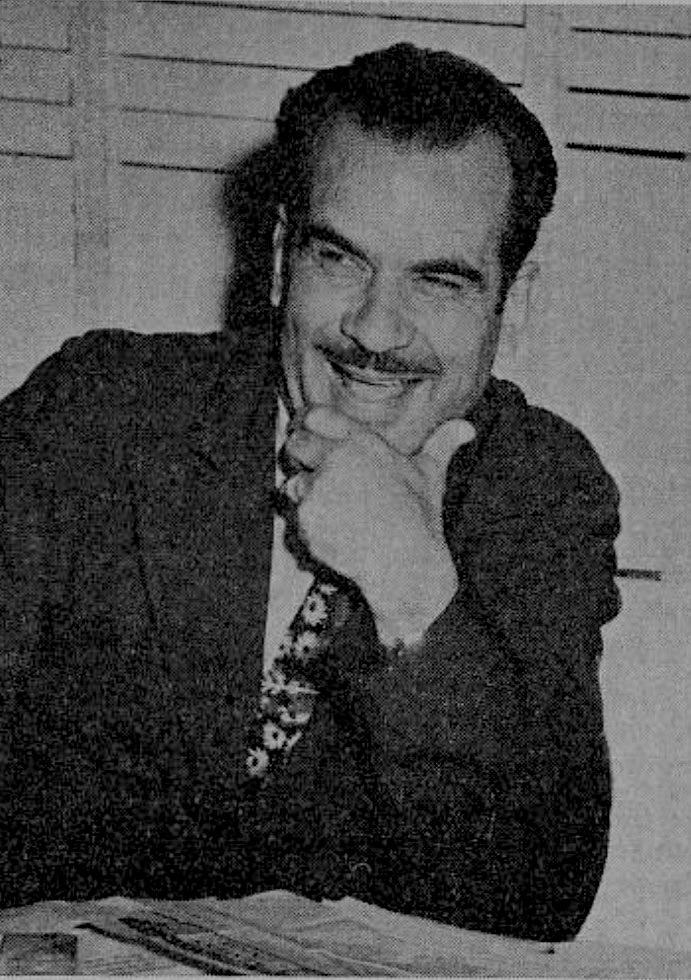
Mexican businessman Jorge Pasquel challenged the supremacy of Chandler and MLB.

In early 1946, Jorge Pasquel and his four brothers, who owned the Mexican League, siphoned campaign funds from the upcoming Mexican presidential election and used them to offer large salaries and signing bonuses to American baseball players. In some cases, the offers were triple the salaries being paid in the Major Leagues. Chandler deterred players from considering Mexican League offers by imposing a five-year ban from Major League Baseball to anyone who played in the Mexican League and did not return by April 1, 1946. In all, eighteen players played for the Mexican League despite the ban, including Mickey Owen, Max Lanier, and Sal Maglie. Vern Stephens initially agreed to play in Mexico as well but returned before Chandler's deadline. Ted Williams, Stan Musial, and Phil Rizzuto were also offered lucrative contracts and incentives, but all eventually declined to play in Mexico.

Shortly after the Mexican League incident, Robert Murphy, a former negotiator for the National Labor Relations Board, attempted to organize the Pittsburgh Pirates into a guild for purposes of collective bargaining. Murphy decried the reserve clause in player contracts, which gave team owners unlimited control over the player's services, and he demanded more rights for players, including the right of contract and the right of salary arbitration. Chandler worked with Pirates officials to avoid a threatened strike by the players. Part of Chandler's intervention included organizing a team of replacement players as a contingency plan; the team would have included Honus Wagner, then 72.

The defections to the Mexican league and the threat of a strike by the Pirates prompted owners to form an advisory committee, chaired by Larry MacPhail, to suggest needed changes that would calm the discontent among the players. On August 27, 1946, the committee presented a draft of a document outlining the changes. Language in the original draft admitted that baseball was operating as a monopoly and that racial bias was the sole reason for segregation in baseball. Baseball's attorneys stripped the controversial language from the version that was eventually adopted by the owners.

=== Breaking baseball's color line ===
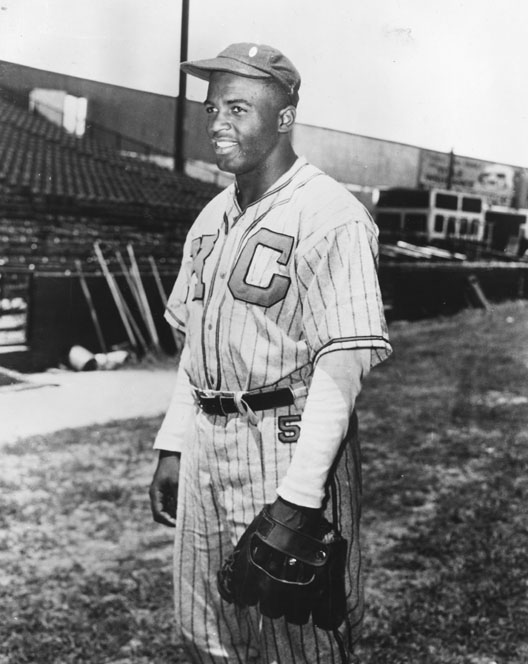
Jackie Robinson broke the baseball color barrier during Chandler's tenure.

Days prior to Chandler's assumption of the commissionership, the Brooklyn Dodgers' general manager, Branch Rickey, had announced the signing of Jackie Robinson to a minor league contract with the Montreal Royals, making him the first black man to play for a Major League Baseball affiliate. The following year, Rickey transferred Robinson's contract from Montreal to Brooklyn, effectively breaking baseball's color line. In a speech at Wilberforce University in February 1948, Rickey recounted a secret meeting that had allegedly been held by baseball officials at the Blackstone Hotel in Chicago on August 28, 1946. At the meeting, Rickey claimed that Ford Frick disseminated a report that stated, "However well-intentioned, the use of Negro players would hazard all physical properties of baseball." According to Rickey, all 15 team owners except for him voted to endorse the report. Rickey claimed Frick meticulously collected all copies of the report at the end of the meeting to prevent them from being disseminated. Baseball historian Bill Marshall later wrote that the document and subsequent vote to which Rickey was referring was the advisory committee's initial draft of recommended reforms. Marshall further recorded that Rickey identified the meeting and the report shortly after his speech at Wilberforce and retracted his claim of 15–1 opposition to Robinson's entry into Major League Baseball.

Chandler, who was also allegedly at the meeting, made no public mention of it until a 1972 interview. In the interview, Chandler then corroborated the essentials of Rickey's story, but he placed the meeting at the Waldorf-Astoria Hotel in January 1947. He also recounted that later in 1947, Rickey came to his home in Kentucky to discuss the matter further. According to Chandler, Rickey professed that he would not move forward with Robinson's transfer unless he had Chandler's full support, which Chandler later pledged. Aside from Chandler's anecdote, which he frequently repeated after the 1972 interview, there is no evidence that his meeting with Rickey ever took place. Nevertheless, future baseball commissioner Bowie Kuhn and Washington Post sportswriter Bob Addie maintained that Robinson would not have played without Chandler's intervention.

That Chandler supported Robinson and the racial integration of baseball is evidenced by his actions during the 1947 season. First and foremost, as commissioner, Chandler had the power to void Robinson's contract, but he chose to approve it. Further, after extreme, race-based jeering at Robinson by the Philadelphia Phillies and their manager, Ben Chapman, Chandler threatened both the team and Chapman personally with disciplinary action for any future incidents of race-based taunting. Later that season, he decisively supported Ford Frick's decision to suspend indefinitely any members of the St. Louis Cardinals who followed through on their threat to strike against racial integration.

=== Other matters ===
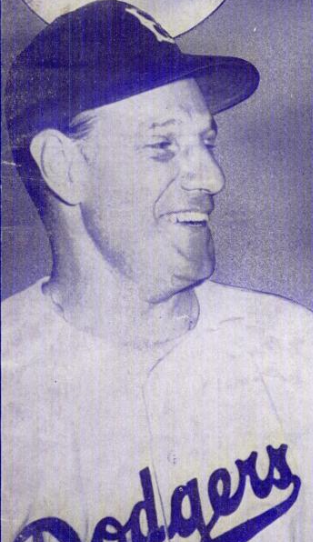
Leo Durocher received a one-year suspension from Chandler for "conduct detrimental to baseball".

During the 1946 postseason, rumors began to swirl that Yankees co-owner Larry MacPhail was lobbying Brooklyn Dodgers manager Leo Durocher to leave the Dodgers and manage the Yankees. The move angered Dodgers owner Branch Rickey, who encouraged Chandler to begin an investigation into the gambling habits of Durocher and his associate, actor George Raft. In the offseason, Chandler and Durocher had a meeting; Chandler counseled Durocher to abandon his gambling. Branch Rickey charged Chandler with maintaining a double standard, however, when the commissioner took no action after seeing MacPhail with two known gamblers at a Yankees–Dodgers preseason exhibition in Havana, Cuba. MacPhail then signed two Dodgers assistant coaches (Chuck Dressen and John Corriden) as aides to Yankee manager Bucky Harris while they were still employed by the Dodgers. Chandler suspended Dressen for 30 days and levied $2,000 fines against MacPhail and the Yankees.

The Yankees–Dodgers feud continued in the New York newspapers throughout the offseason. Charges were levelled by both sides, including accusations that Durocher was a philanderer because of his alleged involvement with married actress Laraine Day, which ultimately resulted in Day's divorce. When Durocher subsequently married Day, a local Catholic priest declared that attending Dodgers games was a venial sin. Prompted in part by this declaration, Chandler suspended Durocher from baseball for a year, just days before Opening Day, citing "conduct detrimental to baseball."

Also in 1947, Chandler sold the rights to broadcast the World Series on the radio for $475,000 and used the money from the contract to establish a pension fund for baseball players. In 1949, Chandler negotiated a seven-year contract with Gillette and the Mutual Broadcasting System to broadcast the Series. Proceeds from the $4,370,000 deal went directly into the pension fund. The same two companies negotiated a six-year, $6 million contract to broadcast the Series on television in 1950. Again, Chandler directed the proceeds into the pension fund.

In 1949, Danny Gardella, who had left the New York Giants for the Mexican League in 1946, filed suit against Major League Baseball, claiming Chandler's ban on players who went to the Mexican League had denied him a means of pursuing his livelihood. Gardella demanded $100,000 in damages from the suspension, and claimed that the award should be tripled because baseball was subject to federal antitrust laws. Similar suits were filed by Max Lanier and Fred Martin, both of whom also played in Mexico. On June 2, 1949, a federal court refused to reinstate the three players pending their trials but urged for the antitrust issues to be adjudicated as soon as possible. Attempting to alleviate the legal pressure on Major League Baseball, Chandler lifted the bans on players who had gone to Mexico almost two years early. Lanier and Martin dropped their suits, but Gardella pursued his. After Gardella's lawyer publicly questioned Chandler in court about baseball's antitrust exemption for a day and a half in September 1949, baseball executives, including Chandler, agreed to settle Gardella's case for $60,000.

Chandler's contract as baseball commissioner was not due to expire until April 1952, but he asked for the owners to extend it in December 1949. The owners voted against offering the extension at that time but promised to reconsider the request in December 1950. The vote in 1950 was nine votes for Chandler and seven against, leaving him three votes short of the necessary three-fourths majority. Chandler asked for the extension to be reconsidered at the owners' meeting on March 12, 1951, but the vote was again 9–7. Upset that his contract was not extended, Chandler resigned effective July 15, 1951.

In an interview with The Sporting News in August 1951, Chandler cited his decision to void a trade between the New York Yankees and Chicago White Sox for outfielder Dick Wakefield as a major factor in his inability to secure a new contract. The Yankees traded Wakefield to the White Sox for cash, but Wakefield refused to report to the White Sox after a salary dispute, which led to a disagreement between the teams over who was responsible for his salary. Chandler voided the trade, making Wakefield's contract the Yankees' responsibility and angering their co-owner, Del Webb. It was not until the 1970s that Chandler began to cite his involvement in the integration of baseball as a reason for his contract not being renewed. Historian John Paul Hill considers that to be unlikely, however, because two of Chandler's strongest allies, Connie Mack and Walter Briggs Sr., were ardently opposed to integration, and Bill DeWitt, the second owner in the American League to integrate, voted against him. Hill points to the Dick Wakefield dispute and Chandler's investigations of Del Webb and Cardinals owner Fred Saigh involving their rumored connections to gambling interests to be more compelling reasons for Chandler's dismissal.

Following his tenure as baseball commissioner, Chandler returned to his law practice. He also engaged in farming and continued to publish a weekly newspaper, The Woodford Sun, which he had bought in 1942. The Kentucky Press Association and the Kentucky Broadcasting Association both named him Man of the Year. He continued his involvement in sports, presiding over the International Baseball Conference from 1952 to 1955.

== Second term as Governor ==
Chandler remained involved in politics throughout his tenure as baseball commissioner. In 1948, he was the de facto leader of the Dixiecrat movement in Kentucky. He hosted Dixiecrat presidential candidate Strom Thurmond at his home when he visited the state, his wife Mildred signed the petition to get Thurmond on the state's ballot, and his newspaper editor, Orval Baylor, was co-chair of the States Rights Democratic Party in Kentucky. He did not officially endorse Thurmond because of his baseball role. By the time that he permanently returned to the state in mid-1951, it was too late to play a major role in the gubernatorial contest, and he endorsed Gov. Lawrence Wetherby, who had succeeded to the office when Earle Clements was elected U.S. senator. He spent the next four years rebuilding his political base in preparation for another run at the office.

=== 1955 gubernatorial campaign ===
Twenty years after first holding the governorship, Chandler again entered the gubernatorial race in 1955, using the slogan "Be like your Pappy and vote for Happy." His opponents in the Democratic Party, led by senator and former governor Earle C. Clements and sitting governor Lawrence Wetherby, had difficulty finding a candidate to oppose him. The most likely choice, Lieutenant Governor Emerson "Doc" Beauchamp, was handicapped by his connections to political bosses in Logan County. Clements virtually handpicked a relatively unknown candidate, Kentucky Court of Appeals Judge Bert T. Combs. Because Combs, whom Chandler nicknamed "The Little Judge", had no record for Chandler to campaign against, Chandler portrayed him as a pawn of Clements and Wetherby, whom he derisively referred to as "Clementine" and "Wetherbine".

The inexperienced Combs did little to help his campaign. His first campaign speech, which he dryly read verbatim from his notes, included the candid admission that it might be necessary to re-institute the state sales tax to balance the budget. Following that speech, a disappointed observer remarked, "Combs opened and closed [his campaign] on the same night." That speech also gave Chandler his main issue for the campaign. He charged that Combs would raise taxes while promising that he would lower them as he had in his first term.

Chandler's strategy in the campaign was to launch an attack upon the Wetherby administration and, before the Clements-Wetherby-Combs faction could react to it, to launch a new one. He claimed that Wetherby had used the state's money frivolously by installing air conditioning in the state capitol and installing a $20,000 rug in his office. (An invoice showing that carpeting for the entire first floor of the capitol had cost one tenth that amount did not stop Chandler from repeating the claim, which he said "didn't hurt anybody, and people liked to hear it".) After a Wetherby administration official approved the purchase of African mahogany paneling for the governor's office, Chandler charged that Wetherby had gone "clear to Africa" to find paneling for his office and promised that, if elected, he would use good, honest Kentucky wood for decoration. He also denounced the construction of a turnpike connecting Elizabethtown and Louisville, the state fairgrounds, and Freedom Hall as unnecessary.

Chandler won the Democratic primary by 18,121 votes over Combs. In the general election, he defeated Republican Edwin R. Denney by 128,976 votes, then the largest margin of victory for a gubernatorial candidate in the state's history.

=== Tenure ===
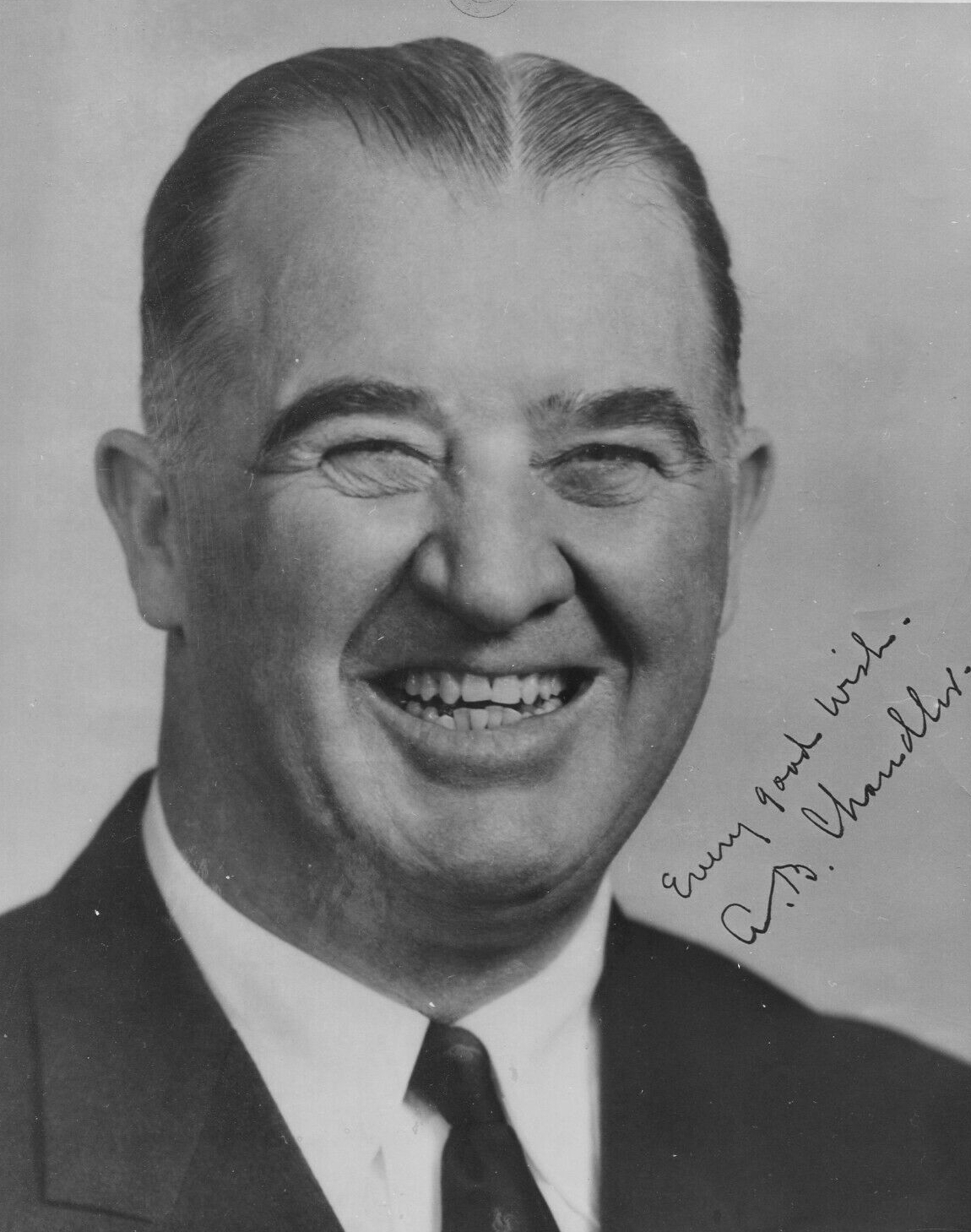
Chandler as governor.

Soon after Chandler returning office, it became clear that he could not fund the social programs initiated by Clements and Wetherby and Chandler's own proposed programs, with the revenue then being brought into the state treasury. He cut the popular Youth Authority, which had been initiated by Wetherby to unify the state's children's welfare programs, but the savings were not enough to balance the budget. To deliver on his campaign promises, Chandler ignored the budget during the regular legislative session in 1956 and then called a special session in which he presented his budget proposal. The proposal called for spending in excess of $46 million more than officials estimated would be brought into the state's coffers over the two-year budget. Chandler convinced legislators to pass the budget, promising to propose a tax plan to pay for the expenditures in a subsequent special session. The promised package added 150,000 citizens to the state's tax rolls, put a surtax on income taxes, and cut tax credits. It created a new 5 percent production tax on whisky and added taxes to deeds and life insurance premiums. It increased the state gasoline tax for trucks by two cents per gallon and raised corporate tax by half a percent. In addition, it transferred the assessment and collection of taxes on certain intangibles from local to state government. The plan also called for a $100 million bond issue, allowing the allocation of generous budgets for state universities and colleges and improvements to the state highway system.

Although Democrats held a majority in both houses of the General Assembly, they were divided by factionalism, which made it difficult for Chandler to find sufficient support for his programs. Some of the factionalism came from Clements and Combs supporters who were not willing to co-operate with Chandler, their chief political enemy. Still other resistance to Chandler came from a group of more liberal lawmakers, like John B. Breckinridge, who simply had philosophical differences with the governor. Near the end of the 1958 legislative session, that group demanded a special session to deal with the need for more money for schools and welfare programs, but Chandler refused to call the session when the liberals would not agree to pass only the measures he put before them. Because of the factionalism, Chandler had to ally with Republican legislators throughout his term to pass many of his proposals, including his tax plan. Frequently, that meant promising to build or repair roads in Republican districts in return for their support of his programs.

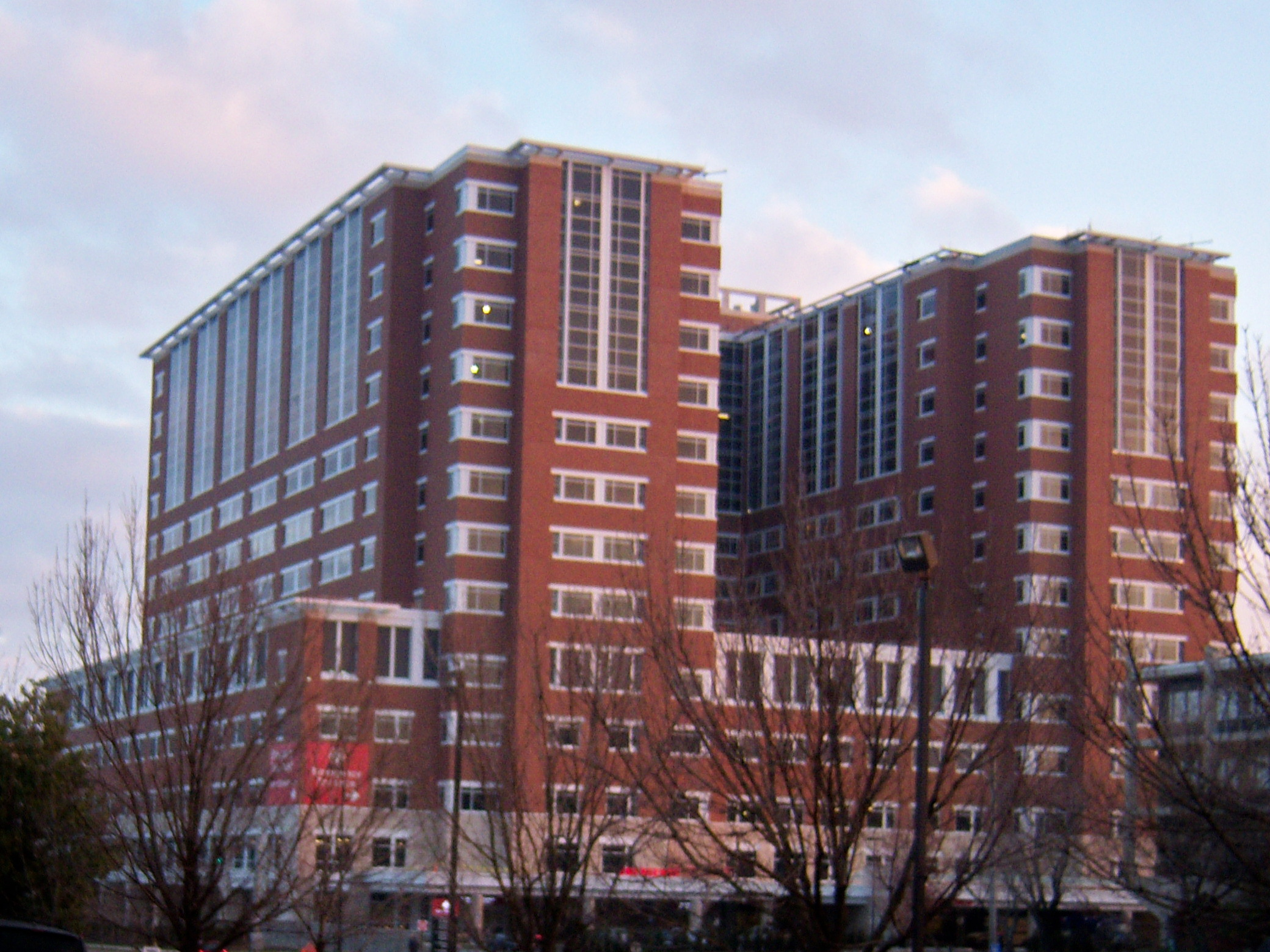
The Albert B. Chandler Hospital, part of UK HealthCare, is named in Chandler's honor.

During his campaign, Chandler had promised that he would fund a medical school at the University of Kentucky although the University of Louisville already had a medical school, which made a poll of state physicians show overwhelming opposition to the plan. Nevertheless, Chandler delivered on his promise by allocating $5 million to the establishment of what became known as the Albert B. Chandler Medical Center. Chandler said that the establishment of the school was his proudest achievement as governor.

Just as when he had been baseball commissioner, Chandler faced the issue of racial integration during his second term as governor. Among his first actions upon his election was to issue an executive order, ensuring that blacks and whites would have equal access to the state park system. He publicly acknowledged the US Supreme Court's 1954 decision in Brown v. Board of Education as the law of the land and promised to enforce it. The Kentucky Court of Appeals struck down Kentucky's Day Law, against integration, the following year. Some areas of the state resisted the change. Notably, in 1956, when nine black students in Sturgis, Kentucky, attempted to enter the all-white Sturgis High School, they were blocked by 500 opponents of integration. On September 4, 1956, Chandler called out the National Guard, including a force of over 900 guardsmen and several M47 Patton tanks, to disperse the crowd. The confrontation lasted a total of 18 days before the protesters peacefully dispersed. Shortly thereafter, Chandler took similar actions in response to a protest in the town of Clay, which was resolved without violence also. Of his actions, Chandler remarked, "We regret it is necessary to use this means of guaranteeing equal rights to our citizens, but that we must do."

Still convinced that he was destined to become president, Chandler attended the 1956 Democratic National Convention in the hope of securing the party's presidential nomination. Despite being told by his advisors that the convention would nominate Adlai Stevenson, Chandler continued to seek the nomination but received only 36 1/2 votes. Following Stevenson's nomination, Chandler returned to Kentucky, bitterly disappointed. The death of Senator Alben Barkley and the expiration of Senator Clements' term would make Kentucky elect two senators also in November 1956. Clements was seeking re-election, and the state Democratic committee chose Wetherby as the nominee for Barkley's seat. Chandler refused to use his office to support Stevenson, Clements or Wetherby, and Republicans Dwight Eisenhower, John Sherman Cooper, and Thruston Ballard Morton won the presidential and the senatorial races in the state.

In the 1959 gubernatorial primary, Chandler threw his support to Lieutenant Governor Harry Lee Waterfield. The anti-Chandler forces eventually put forth Bert Combs as their nominee again.

Having learned from his previous campaign, Combs now attacked Chandler for allegedly requiring state employees to donate 2% of their salaries to his campaign. According to Combs, Chandler had deposited the money in a bank in Cuba, but the money was lost when Fidel Castro overthrew the government during the Cuban Revolution. Ultimately, Combs prevailed in the primary by 33,001 votes.

Republicans nominated John M. Robsion Jr. to oppose Combs, but Combs ultimately won the general election by a wide margin.

== Later life ==
In 1957, Chandler was one of ten inaugural members of the Kentucky Sports Hall of Fame. A vestryman at St. John's Church in Versailles, he was awarded the Bishop's Medal of the Episcopal Church in 1959. The same year, he received the Cross of Military Service from the United Daughters of the Confederacy. He served as a trustee of the Ty Cobb Foundation and Transylvania University. At the 1960 Democratic National Convention, he again sought the party's presidential nomination, as he considered that the front-runner, John F. Kennedy, was "a nice young fellow ... (but) too young for the nomination". Chandler proposed for him to be the presidential nominee, with Kennedy as the nominee for vice-president, but the convention chose Kennedy for president instead.

On January 3, 1962, Chandler opened a campaign headquarters in Frankfort, announcing his bid for an unprecedented third term as governor with the slogan "ABC [Albert Benjamin Chandler] in 1963". His opponent in the primary was Edward T. "Ned" Breathitt Jr., the choice of outgoing Governor Bert Combs. Chandler reverted to his familiar campaign themes, charging the Combs administration with wasting state funds in the construction of a floral clock at the state Capitol and denouncing Combs for re-instituting the state sales tax. However, he found it very difficult to adapt to campaigning via television, an increasingly important medium, and his attacks mostly fell flat.

Breathitt enraged Chandler by charging that when Chandler was a senator, he had voted in favor of declaring World War II, but soon afterward, he had resigned his commission as a reserve army captain. According to Chandler's version of events, after he voted in favor of the war declaration, he called US Secretary of War Henry Stimson and asked to be put on active duty. Chandler said that Stimson told him he would rather have a senator than a captain, and then Chandler resigned his commission. Chandler's explanation did not stop Breathitt from repeating the charge often on the campaign trail.

Chandler lost to Breathitt in the primary by 62,407 votes, but his running mate, Harry Lee Waterfield, won the nomination for lieutenant governor. Journalist John Ed Pearce believed that the loss marked the demise of the Chandler wing of the Democratic Party in Kentucky, but Chandler himself remained somewhat influential.

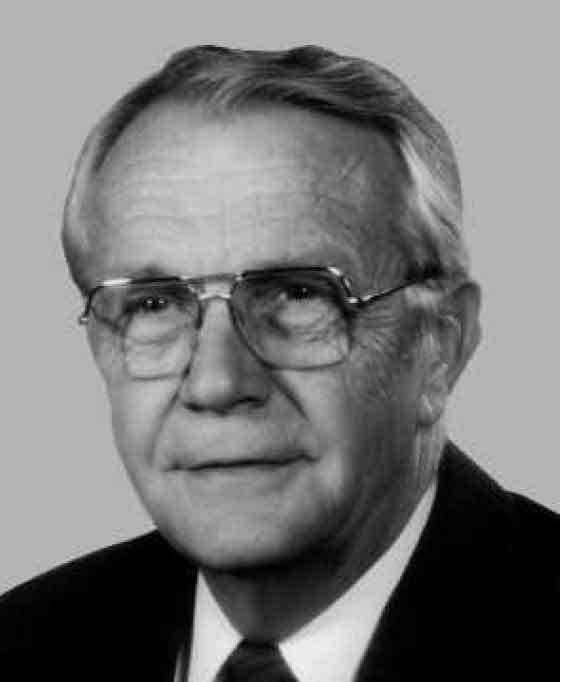
Democrat Wendell Ford defeated Republican Tom Emberton and Chandler, who ran as an independent, for governor in 1971.

In 1965, Chandler was named to the University of Kentucky Hall of Distinguished Alumni and became commissioner of the Continental Football League (COFL). Chandler resigned from his COFL position in 1966 after league trustees supported a proposal to allow players from the major professional American football leagues, which he had been told would not happen. He served as Democratic National Committeeman from Kentucky. Becoming somewhat of a perennial candidate, he unsuccessfully ran for governor in 1967 and 1971. After his loss in the 1967 Democratic primary, he endorsed Republican Louie B. Nunn. After his election, Nunn appointed Chandler to the first of his three terms on the University of Kentucky's board of trustees.

In 1968, Chandler was given serious consideration as the vice-presidential running mate of Alabama's former governor, George Wallace, in the latter's American Independent Party bid for president. Wallace instead turned to Air Force General Curtis LeMay. The ticket lost to Richard M. Nixon and Spiro T. Agnew. Chandler said that he and Wallace had been unable to come to an agreement on their positions on racial matters.

In 1971, Chandler again entered the gubernatorial race, now as an independent, but he garnered only 39,493 votes, compared to 470,720 for eventual Democratic victor Wendell H. Ford, and 412,653 for Republican challenger Tom Emberton. Ford's successor, Julian Carroll, again appointed Chandler to the University of Kentucky's board of trustees.

The Major League Baseball Veterans Committee chose Chandler for induction into the Baseball Hall of Fame in 1982. In 1987, filmmaker Robby Henson profiled Chandler in a 30-minute documentary entitled Roads Home: The Life and Times of A.B. 'Happy' Chandler.

Chandler endorsed dark horse candidate Wallace G. Wilkinson in the 1987 Democratic primary, and his endorsement helped underdog Wilkinson gain traction early in the race. After Wilkinson's election as governor, he appointed Chandler to a voting seat on the University of Kentucky's board of trustees, where he had been an honorary trustee. (In 1981, Governor John Y. Brown Jr. had designated Chandler an "honorary", non-voting, member of the board.) While discussing the University of Kentucky's decision to dispose of its investments in South Africa at a meeting of the university's board of trustees on April 5, 1988, Chandler remarked, "You know Zimbabwe's all nigger now. There aren't any whites." The comment immediately drew calls for Chandler's resignation from the University Senate Council and the Student Government Association, and approximately 50 students marched on university president David Roselle's office demanding for Chandler to apologize or resign. Commenting on the controversy the next day, Chandler said, "I was raised in a small town in Western Kentucky. There were 400 whites and 400 blacks, and we called them niggers and they didn't mind. And I reverted temporarily, at least, to that expression, and of course, I wish I hadn't." That apology did not satisfy many, and 200 protesters marched on the State Capitol, demanding for Wilkinson to remove Chandler from the board. Wilkinson refused to remove Chandler and urged the crowd to forgive him.

Chandler published his autobiography, Heroes, Plain Folks, and Skunks, in 1989. In an interview with The Kentucky Kernel, the University of Kentucky's student newspaper, Chandler was asked about his controversial comments the previous year, which were addressed in the book. Chandler reportedly told the paper, "I said most of the Zimbabweans were niggers and they are niggers." The comment sparked fresh protests and calls for Chandler's resignation. In response to the controversy, Chandler's personal assistant said, "He used the word again in explaining that it was not intended by him to be a racial slur" and called the Kernel's story "a complete and total distortion".

Chandler died in Versailles on June 15, 1991, and was buried in the church yard of Pisgah Presbyterian Church near Versailles. Prior to his death, he had been the oldest living member of the Baseball Hall of Fame and was the longest-living former Kentucky governor.

Political offices
Preceded by James Breathitt Jr.	Lieutenant Governor of Kentucky; December 8, 1931 – December 10, 1935	Succeeded by Keen Johnson
Preceded by Ruby Laffoon	Governor of Kentucky; December 10, 1935 – October 9, 1939	Succeeded by Keen Johnson
Preceded by Lawrence Wetherby	Governor of Kentucky; December 13, 1955 – December 8, 1959	Succeeded by Bert Combs
U.S. Senate
Preceded by M. M. Logan	U.S. senator (Class 2) from Kentucky; October 10, 1939 – November 1, 1945; Served alongside: Alben W. Barkley	Succeeded by William A. Stanfill
Party political offices
Preceded by James Breathitt	Democratic nominee for Lieutenant Governor of Kentucky; 1931	Succeeded by Keen Johnson
Preceded by Ruby Laffoon	Democratic nominee for Governor of Kentucky; 1935	Succeeded by Keen Johnson
Preceded by M. M. Logan	Democratic nominee for U.S. Senator from Kentucky (Class 2); 1940, 1942	Succeeded by John Brown
Preceded by Lawrence Wetherby	Democratic nominee for Governor of Kentucky; 1955	Succeeded by Bert Combs
