= My Old Kentucky Home =

19th-century sentimental ballad by Stephen Foster

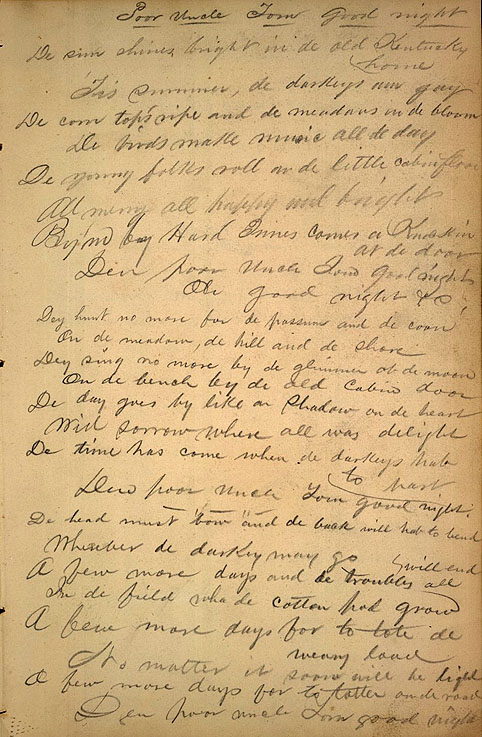
- Early draft of "My Old Kentucky Home" by Foster

Song
- Written: c. 1852–1853
- Published: January 1853 by Firth, Pond, & Co.
- Genre: Sentimental ballad, minstrel ("plantation melody")
- Songwriter: Stephen C. Foster
- Composer: Stephen C. Foster
- Lyricist: Stephen C. Foster

"My Old Kentucky Home, Good-Night!", typically shortened to "My Old Kentucky Home", is a sentimental ballad written by Stephen Foster, probably composed in 1852. It was published in January 1853 by Firth, Pond, & Co. of New York. Foster was likely inspired by Harriet Beecher Stowe's anti-slavery novel Uncle Tom's Cabin, as evidenced by the title of a sketch in Foster's sketchbook, "Poor Uncle Tom, Good-Night!"

The song is often interpreted as an anti-slavery song, echoing the suffering of slaves separated from their family. Frederick Douglass wrote in his 1855 autobiography My Bondage and My Freedom that the song "awakens sympathies for the slave, in which antislavery principles take root, grow, and flourish". However, the song's publication by Firth & Pond as a minstrel song and its use in "Tom shows" (stagings of Stowe's novel of varying degrees of sincerity and faithfulness to the original text), and other settings, have clouded its reception.

== Creation and career impact ==
The creation of the song "My Old Kentucky Home, Good-Night!" established a decisive moment within Stephen Foster's career in regard to his personal beliefs on the institution of slavery, as, following publication of the song, Foster began to abandon minstrelsy and writing music with African-American vernacular.

Foster's brother Morrison indicated in correspondence in 1898 that Foster was an "occasional visitor" to the plantation of their cousins the Rowan family known as Federal Hill. No evidence exists to confirm that Foster was inspired by imagery seen at Federal Hill for the song's composition, and the imagery in the song does not include any specific markers to Federal Hill. The Foster and Rowan family's close relationship appears to have been initiated through Stephen's sister Charlotte, who stayed with the Rowans at Federal Hill in 1828. While Charlotte lived with the Rowan family, Atkinson Hill Rowan made a proposal of marriage to her, which she ultimately declined. Charlotte died in the home of George Washing Barclay, a cousin of both families, with Atkinson Hill Rowan at her bedside.

The song "My Old Kentucky Home, Good-Night!" is one of many examples of the loss of home in Foster's work. Biographers believe that this common theme originated from the loss of Foster's childhood home, known as the "White Cottage", an estate his mother referred to as an Eden, in reference to the Garden of Eden. The family was financially supported by the family patriarch William Foster, who owned vast holdings, which were lost through bad business dealings that left the family destitute and unable to keep possession of the White Cottage; the family was forced to leave the estate when Stephen Foster was three years old. After years of financial instability and the sharing of memories of the White Cottage with Stephen by his parents and siblings, the impact of longing for a permanent home that was no longer available to him greatly influenced his writing.

== Reception ==
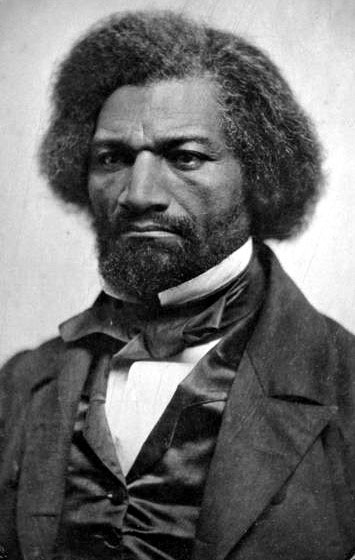
Frederick Douglass in 1856

Upon its release in 1853 by Firth, Pond & Company, "My Old Kentucky Home, Good-Night" grew quickly in popularity, selling thousands of copies. The song's popular and nostalgic theme of the loss of home resonated with the public and received support from some within the abolitionist movement in the United States. For example, African-American abolitionist Frederick Douglass promoted the song, among other similar songs of the time period, in his autobiography My Bondage and My Freedom as evoking a sentimental theme that promotes and popularizes the cause of abolishing slavery in the United States. Douglass commented, "They [My Old Kentucky Home, Good-Night!, etc.] are heart songs, and the finest feelings of human nature are expressed in them. [They] can make the heart sad as well as merry, and can call forth a tear as well as a smile. They awaken the sympathies for the slave", he stated, "in which anti-slavery principles take root and flourish".

Foster sold the work to the music publishing company Firth & Pond that published and branded the work as a "plantation melody" among the catalog of Christy's Minstrels. As a result, the song was popular on the blackface minstrel stage and in melodrama through the nineteenth century. Frequently, the song was included in "Tom shows", stagings of Uncle Tom's Cabin. The song remained popular in amateur blackface minstrel shows through at least the first half of the twentieth century. While some of the shows in which "My Old Kentucky Home" was featured depicted slavery as wrong and the enslaved people sympathetically, most of these shows hewed to the common demeaning traditions and tropes of blackface minstrelsy.

The song held popularity for over a decade and throughout the American Civil War. The song's reach throughout the United States and popularity have been attributed to soldiers of the war, who passed the tune from location to location during the war's tenure. The song remained popular through the nineteenth century. The typical reduction of the song's title from "My Old Kentucky Home, Good-Night!" to "My Old Kentucky Home" occurred after the turn of the century.

The song's first verse and chorus are recited annually at the Kentucky Derby. Colonel Matt Winn introduced the song as a Derby tradition. As early as 1930, Foster's song was played to accompany the post parade; the University of Louisville Marching Band has played the song for all but a few years since 1936. In 1982, Churchill Downs honored Foster by establishing the Stephen Foster Handicap. The University of Kentucky, University of Louisville, Murray State University, Eastern Kentucky University, and Western Kentucky University bands play the song at their schools' football and basketball games.

== Kentucky state song ==
WHEREAS, the song, "My Old Kentucky Home," by Stephen Collins Foster, has immortalized Kentucky throughout the civilized world, and is known and sung in every State and Nation; ...

— Preamble to a 1928 Act of the Kentucky legislature

During the first decades of the twentieth century, the song became increasingly popular nationwide and the state legislature of the Commonwealth of Kentucky sought to utilize the song's popularity by establishing it as Kentucky's state song.

On March 11, 1986, a group of students from the Sendai Christian Educational Institute in Miyagi, Japan sang the song on their field trip to the Kentucky General Assembly, using the original lyrics that included the word "darkies". Legislator Carl Hines was infuriated by this, and subsequently introduced a resolution that would substitute the word "people" in place of "darkies" whenever the song was used by the House of Representatives. State Senator Georgia Davis Powers introduced a similar resolution in the Kentucky State Senate. Both chambers adopted their respective resolution.

== Modern impact ==
Today, the song "My Old Kentucky Home" remains an important composition due to its role in the evolution of American songwriting and is an influential song in American culture. According to popular-song analysts, the appeal of the theme of "returning home" is one in which listeners of "My Old Kentucky Home" are able to personally relate within their own lives. Many revisions and updates of the song have occurred throughout the past century, which have further ingrained the song in American culture. These revisions and a constantly adapting cultural landscape also complicate the song's legacy and meanings for different people.

== Recording history ==
"My Old Kentucky Home" was recorded many times during the early era of cylinder recordings. The Cylinder Audio Archive at the University of California (Santa Barbara) Library contains 19 commercial recordings of the song (in addition to several home recordings). In most cases, even those of the commercial recordings, the Archive is unable to determine the precise dates (or even years) of either their recording or their release, with some cylinders being dated only to a forty-year range from the 1890s to the 1920s. The earliest recording of "My Old Kentucky Home" for which the Archive was able to determine a precise year of release is from 1898 and features an unidentified cornet duo. However, the song is known to have been recorded earlier than that (in February 1894) by the Standard Quartette, a vocal group that was appearing in a musical that featured the song (making their recording perhaps the earliest example of a cast recording). No copy of that cylinder is known to have survived. And although cylinder recordings were more popular during the 1800s than disc records, some of the latter were being sold, mostly by Berliner Gramophone. A version sung by A.C. Weaver was recorded in September 1894 and released with catalog number 175.

The popularity of "My Old Kentucky Home" as recording material continued into the 20th century, despite the fact that the song was then more than fifty years old. In the first two decades of the century, newly established Victor Records released thirteen versions of the song (plus five more recordings that included it as part of a medley). During that same period, Columbia Records issued a similar number, including one by Margaret Wilson (daughter of U.S. president Woodrow Wilson). One of the major vocal groups of the day, the Peerless Quartet, recorded it twice, as did internationally known operatic soprano Alma Gluck. It was also recorded by various marching and concert bands, including three recordings by one of the most well-known, Sousa's Band, as well as three by the house concert band at Edison Records.

Although the frequency of its recording dropped off as the century progressed, "My Old Kentucky Home" continued to be used as material by some of the major popular singers of the day. Versions were recorded by Kate Smith, Bing Crosby, and Al Jolson. A version by operatic contralto Marian Anderson was released in Japan and Paul Robeson recorded his version for an English company while living in London in the late 1920s. The song continued to find expression in non-traditional forms, including New Orleans jazz versions by Louis Armstrong and Bunk Johnson, and a swing version by Gene Krupa. For a listing of some other recorded versions of the song, see External links.

In 2001, the National Endowment for the Arts and the Recording Industry Association of America promoted a list of the 365 "Songs of the Century" that best displayed "historical significance of not only the song but also of the record and artist".

== Adaptations ==
By the time commercial music began to be recorded, the verse melody of "My Old Kentucky Home" had become so widely known that recording artists sometimes quoted it in material that was otherwise unrelated to Foster's song. The 1918 song "Rock-a-Bye Your Baby with a Dixie Melody", recorded and popularized by Al Jolson, quotes the chorus phrase "weep no more my lady", and also makes reference to two other Foster songs. Henry Burr's 1921 recording of "Kentucky Home" quotes the verse melody in an interlude midway through the record. And vaudeville singer Billy Murray's 1923 recording of "Happy and Go-Lucky in My Old Kentucky Home" adds the melody in the record's finale. An earlier recording by Murray, 1915's "We'll Have a Jubilee in My Old Kentucky Home", takes the further step of incorporating a portion of Foster's melody (but not his lyrics) into each chorus. And a few decades earlier than that, a young Charles Ives, while still a student at Yale University in the 1890s, used Foster's melody (both the verse and the chorus) as a strain in one of his marches. Ives often quoted from Foster and musicologist Clayton Henderson has detected material from "My Old Kentucky Home" in eight of his works.

In the mid-1960s, songwriter Randy Newman used the verse of "My Old Kentucky Home" (with modified lyrics) as the chorus to his "Turpentine and Dandelion Wine". Newman recorded this adaptation for his 12 Songs album (1970, Reprise RS 6373) under the title "Old Kentucky Home". However, the adaptation had been recorded earlier at least twice. The first was by the Beau Brummels, who recorded it for their Triangle album (1967, Warner Brothers WS 1692). The second was by the Alan Price Set, who included it as the B-side to their "Love Story" single (1968, Decca F 12808). Since Newman's recording, the adaptation was covered several times more. The only version that charted was by Johnny Cash, who released it as a single from his John R. Cash album (1975, Columbia KC 33370). The single reached No. 42 on Billboard's country-music chart.

== Appearance in media ==
"My Old Kentucky Home" has appeared in many films, live action and animated, and in television episodes, in the 20th and 21st centuries.

The original title for the first draft of Margaret Mitchell's 1936 novel Gone with the Wind was "Tote The Weary Load", a lyric from "My Old Kentucky Home, Good-Night!" Scarlett O'Hara and Rhett Butler sing the song in Chapter 17, and the lyric "a few more days for to tote the weary load" appears in the text of the novel as Scarlett is returning to Tara. In 1939, "My Old Kentucky Home" was featured in the film version of Gone with the Wind both instrumentally and with lyrics. In the movie, Prissy, played by Butterfly McQueen, sings the line, "a few more days for to tote the weary load".

My Old Kentucky Home 1926 by the Fleischer Brothers

Judy Garland sang "My Old Kentucky Home, Good-Night!" live on December 14, 1938, on the radio show, America Calling. She later covered it again on The All Time Flop Parade with Bing Crosby and The Andrews Sisters. On April 29, 1953, Garland headlined a Kentucky Derby week appearance in Lexington, Kentucky, named "The Bluegrass Festival" where she sang the song "My Old Kentucky Home", accompanied by a single violin.

In 1940, Bing Crosby sang "My Old Kentucky Home, Good-Night!" via radio broadcast with Leopold Stokowski conducting a symphony for the dedication of the Stephen Foster postage stamp release held in Bardstown, Kentucky, at My Old Kentucky Home.

Kate Smith performed the song on March 20, 1969, on The Dean Martin Show with Mickey Rooney and Barbara Eden.

In 2009 the song was covered in Mad Men, Season 3, Episode 3, "My Old Kentucky Home." Roger Sterling (played by John Slattery) performs the song in blackface for his young bride at a Kentucky Derby party.

In 2010 the song was covered in The Simpsons, Season 21, Episode 13, "The Color Yellow". Marge and Lisa read from the footnotes of a cookbook written by Mabel Simpson in which she describes the escape of a slave, Virgil, who is assisted by Eliza Simpson. Virgil and Eliza find safe harbor in a circus operated by Krusty the Clown, who hides them from slave patrollers by disguising them as circus acts. Krusty asks what talents Virgil possesses, to which he replies that he has music talent and then performs the song, "My Old Kentucky Home" while playing violin. The song also appears in the episode "Rosebud", where a young George Burns sings the song's first line.

Johnny Depp, Lyle Lovett, David Amram and Warren Zevon covered the song "My Old Kentucky Home" at the tribute memorial of journalist Hunter S. Thompson in December 1996. One of Thompson's most notable pieces, "The Kentucky Derby Is Decadent and Depraved", in addition to Thompson being a native of Louisville, Kentucky, inspired the performers to cover the song for his tribute. The performance was recreated 9 years later in 2005 at midnight after Thompson's ashes were blasted from a cannon.

Don Henley stated in 2015 for the Los Angeles Times that some of the music he wrote for the Eagles was inspired by the music of Stephen Foster. Henley states that, as a child, his grandmother sang songs such as "My Old Kentucky Home".

My grandmother lived with us. She sat in a rocking chair every day, singing hymns and Stephen Foster songs: 'My Old Kentucky Home,' 'Way Down Upon the Suwanee River' and 'The Old Folks At Home,' and all those very American things. That's probably where I got 'Desperado.' If you listen to that melody and those chords ... Billy Joel said to me the minute he heard it, 'That's Stephen Foster! I said, 'OK, fine!'

== Lyrics by Stephen C. Foster ==
The original Stephen Foster lyrics of the song are:

My old Kentucky Home, good-night!

The sun shines bright in the old Kentucky home,
'Tis summer, the darkies are gay,
The corn top's ripe and the meadow's in the bloom
While the birds make music all the day.
The young folks roll on the little cabin floor,
All merry, all happy and bright:
By'n by Hard Times comes a knocking at the door,
Then my old Kentucky Home, good night.

Chorus:
Weep no more, my lady, oh! weep no more today!
We will sing one song
For the old Kentucky Home,
For the old Kentucky Home, far away.

They hunt no more for the possum and the coon
On the meadow, the hill and the shore,
They sing no more by the glimmer of the moon,
On the bench by the old cabin door.
The day goes by like a shadow o'er the heart,
With sorrow where all was delight:
The time has come when the darkies have to part,
Then my old Kentucky Home, good-night!

Chorus.

The head must bow and the back will have to bend,
Wherever the darkey may go:
A few more days, and the trouble all will end
In the field where the sugar-canes grow.
A few more days for to tote the weary load,
No matter 'twill never be light,
A few more days till we totter on the road,
Then my old Kentucky Home, good-night!

Chorus.

== See also ==
- History of slavery in Kentucky
- Slavery in the United States
