= Old Kentucky Home =

1967 song written by Randy Newman

Song by The Beau Brummels

from the album Triangle
- Released: 1967
- Genre: Rock
- Length: 2:05
- Label: Warner Bros.
- Songwriter: Randy Newman
- Producer: Lenny Waronker

"Old Kentucky Home"

Song by Randy Newman

from the album 12 Songs
- Released: 1970
- Genre: Rock
- Length: 2:40
- Label: Reprise
- Songwriter: Randy Newman
- Producer: Lenny Waronker

"Old Kentucky Home" is a song written by Randy Newman. It was first released by the Beau Brummels on their 1967 album Triangle, Newman released his own version on his 1970 album 12 Songs. It was also covered by several artists, including Johnny Cash, whose version charted on the Billboard Hot Country Singles chart in 1975. Cash released the song under the title "My Old Kentucky Home (Turpentine and Dandelion Wine)".

== Lyrics and music ==
The lyrics of "Old Kentucky Home" mock hillbilly stereotypes. The singer describes how he enjoys drinking dandelion wine and shooting birds off of a telephone wire, how his sister grew fat rather than tall and his parents don't let her out much except at night, and how his brother gets drunk and would whup his woman until she went away. The singer ends each verse by assuring the listener that he doesn't care that his family is falling apart because he's all right.

The song's chorus quotes the line "Oh, the sun shines bright on / My old Kentucky home" from Stephen Foster's song "My Old Kentucky Home". Foster's song had been originally published as a minstrel song. This tied in to what music critic Robert Hilburn noted as a theme of the song: "how racial and class stereotyping had always been an accepted part of American pop music." While Foster's song is about a slave who has had to abandon his home, possibly inspired by Uncle Tom's Cabin where Tom's owner has to liquidate his assets, Newman biographer Kevin Courrier described Newman's version as "an updated booze-soaked portrait of that idyllic abobe." Courrier says of the chorus that "Newman paints such a ridiculous picture of family dysfunction that when he gets to the chorus, Foster's words are not only stripped of their longing for home, they're transformed ironically into denial of one."

Thousand Oaks Star critic Bob Baker noted that while the song is nothing like Foster's classic song, it is similar to Foster's song in that "it relates to life in a Kentucky home but it's not very complimentary." Newman himself said of the song:

The funniest part of the song is taken from Stephen Foster – the "sun shines bright". Now it was probably about "pickaninnies" or "darkies" at some point. It's about mountain people's ignorance or making fun of people who think that's funny. It's a good song because Stephen Foster wrote the hook.

The melody is built up from small pitch-range-motives. In Newman's version, Ry Cooder's slide guitar generates a country music feel. Reviewing Newman's version, Allmusic critic Matthew Greenwald described the music as providing a "cheery country & western musical backdrop" to the lyrics. Hilburn described the song as being "a sort of modern mixing of the Stephen Foster original and Erskine Caldwell's 'God's Little Acre' atmosphere."

== Versions ==
"My Old Kentucky Home (Turpentine and Dandelion Wine)"

Single by Johnny Cash

from the album John R. Cash
- B-side: "Hard Times Comin'"
- Released: 1975
- Genre: Country
- Length: 2:45
- Label: Columbia
- Songwriter: Randy Newman
- Producer: Gary Klein

The original version of "Old Kentucky Home" was released by the Beau Brummels on their 1967 album Triangle. Newman released his own version on his 1970 album 12 Songs. He also released a live version on his 1971 live album Randy Newman Live. Johnny Cash released a version on his 1975 album John R. Cash under the title "My Old Kentucky Home (Turpentine and Dandelion Wine)". This version was released as a single and reached number 42 on the Billboard Hot Country Singles chart.

== Reception ==
Greenwald called "Old Kentucky Home" "an excellent example of" why Newman was "one of the finest storyteller/songwriters of his day." Fellow Allmusic critic Mark Deming called it "a hilarious and quite uncharitable look at life in the deep South." Courrier felt the song was "ingenious" because Newman doesn't reveal where his sympathies lie, comparing the song to some of Bob Dylan's work where "the listener can't be sure what he's taking in." Courrier also praised the song's vivid "sense of place". Baltimore Sun critic Bob Grover considered it his favorite song on 12 Songs while noting that Newman "uses several vocal tricks and turns without seeming the least bit affected." The Times (Trenton, New Jersey) critic Alan Edwards praised the song for being "painfully perverse".

"Old Kentucky Home" has been released on several of Newman's compilation albums, including the 1998 reissue of Lonely at the Top: The Best of Randy Newman and Guilty: 30 Years of Randy Newman.

The Georgia Humane Society criticized Cash for covering the song due to the line about "picking birds off the telephone lines with this gun of mine." In response, Cash promised to write a new song consistent with the humane society's viewpoint.
