= Have You Seen My Baby? =

1969 song by Fats Domino, and covered by Randy Newman and Ringo Starr

Promotional single by Randy Newman

from the album 12 Songs
- Released: May 1970
- Genre: Rock and roll; R&B
- Length: 2:32
- Label: Reprise
- Songwriter: Randy Newman
- Producer: Lenny Waronker

"Have You Seen My Baby?" is a song written by American pianist and singer-songwriter Randy Newman and recorded by American pianist Fats Domino as the B-side to Domino's "Make Me Belong to You", later recorded by its original songwriter Newman for his 1970 album 12 Songs. In 1973, Ringo Starr covered it for his album Ringo. (Note: Starr's version has sometimes been given the subtitle "Hold On".)

== Background ==
"Have You Seen My Baby?" was originally released by American pianist Fats Domino in 1970, after Newman wrote it as a tribute to Domino. Newman had prepared the horn arrangement for Domino's recording. Newman also released a version on his 1970 album 12 Songs, using phrasing similar to Domino's. Newman said, "When we did it, it was like him imitating me imitating him.

The opening line "Have you seen my baby on the avenue" comes from Ernie K-Doe's 1961 song "Wanted, $10,000.00 Reward". Newman biographer Kevin Courrier called the song "a playful romp that could have appeared anywhere in the canon of Southern R&B" except for a verse that Courrier described as "pure Randy Newman" in which the singer asks his baby not to talk to strangers but she replies "I'll talk to strangers if I want to / 'Cause I'm a stranger too."

== Reception ==
AllMusic critic Matthew Greenwald stated for a review of Newman's version of the song that "Drawing on his love of Fats Domino and other New Orleans-based rhythm & blues music, Newman's song sounds like an outtake from a mid-'50s Domino session." praising it for being a "simple torch rocker and shows Newman's versatility of different musical forms."

== Ringo Starr version ==
"Have You Seen My Baby?"

Song by Ringo Starr

from the album Ringo
- Released: November 2, 1973
- Genre: Rock
- Length: 3:44
- Label: Apple
- Songwriter: Randy Newman
- Producer: Richard Perry

In 1973, English drummer and Beatles drummer Ringo Starr recorded a cover version for his album Ringo, released as the second track on the album. Courrier praised Starr's version as having "real verve" and particularly praised Marc Bolan's boogie guitar playing and James Booker's honky-tonk piano playing.

=== Recording ===
The recording of Starr's version commenced on March 5, 1973, when the backing track was recorded at Sunset Sound Recorders. The last known date for recording sessions concluded on July 11.

== Personnel ==
=== Randy Newman version ===
According to the song's YouTube video:

- Randy Newman – piano, vocals
- Al McKibbon – bass
- Clarence White – guitar
- Gene Parsons – drums
- Jim Gordon – drums
- Lyle Ritz – bass
- Milt Holland – percussion
- Ron Elliott – guitar
- Roy Harte – percussion
- Ry Cooder – slide guitar

=== Ringo Starr recording ===
According to the liner notes of the album:

- Ringo Starr – vocals, drums
- Marc Bolan – guitar
- James Booker – piano
- Klaus Voormann – bass guitar
- Jim Keltner – drums
- Milt Holland – percussion
- Tom Scott – horns and horn arrangement

== Sources ==
- Courrier, Kevin (2005). Randy Newman: American Dreams. ECW Press. ISBN 1-55022-690-8.
- Harry, Bill (2004). The Ringo Starr Encyclopedia. London: Virgin Books. ISBN 978-0-7535-0843-5.
- Hilburn, Robert (2024). A Few Words in Defense of Our Country: The Biography of Randy Newman. Da Capo. ISBN 9780306834691.
- Perone, James E. (October 31, 2012). The Album: A Guide to Pop Music's Most Provocative, Influential, and Important Creations. ABC-CLIO. ISBN 978-0313379062.
- Spizer, Bruce (2005). The Beatles Solo on Apple Records. New Orleans, LA: 498 Productions. ISBN 0-9662649-5-9.
- Strong, Martin C. (October 21, 2004). The Great Rock Discography: Complete Discographies Listing Every Track Recorded by More Than 1,200 Artists (7th ed.). Canongate U.S. ISBN 1841956155.
