= Harvey Helm =

American politician

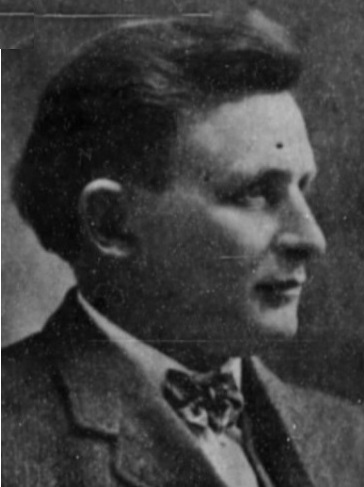

Member of the Kentucky House of Representatives from the 66th district
- In office January 1, 1894 – January 1, 1896
- Preceded by: D. B. Edmiston (Note: As the representative from Lincoln County.)
- Succeeded by: B. B. King

Personal details
- Party: Democratic

Harvey Helm (December 2, 1865 – March 3, 1919) was a United States representative from Kentucky. He was born in Danville, Kentucky.

== Biography ==
He attended the Stanford Male Academy and was graduated from the Central University of Kentucky in 1887. He studied law and was admitted to the bar in 1890 and began practice in Stanford, Kentucky.

Helm was a member of the Kentucky House of Representatives in 1894 and the county attorney of Lincoln County, Kentucky 1897–1905. He was a delegate to the Democratic National Convention in 1900. Helm was elected as a Democrat to the Sixtieth and to the six succeeding Congresses and served from March 4, 1907, until his death before the commencement of the Sixty-sixth Congress. While in Congress, he was chairman, Committee on Expenditures in the Department of War (Sixty-second Congress) and the Committee on the Census (Sixty-third through Sixty-fifth Congresses). He died in Columbus, Mississippi in 1919 and was buried in Buffalo Spring Cemetery, Stanford, Kentucky.

== See also ==
- List of members of the United States Congress who died in office (1900–1949)

== Notes ==
U.S. House of Representatives
Preceded by George G. Gilbert	Member of the U.S. House of Representatives from Kentucky's 8th congressional district 1907 – 1919	Succeeded by King Swope
