= Randy Newman Live =

Live album by Randy Newman
- Released: June 20, 1971
- Recorded: September 17–19, 1970
- Venues: The Bitter End in Greenwich Village, New York City
- Genre: Rock
- Length: 28:34
- Label: Reprise
- Producers: Lenny Waronker, Russ Titelman

Randy Newman chronology
12 Songs (1970)	Randy Newman Live (1971)	Sail Away (1972)

Back cover
- Backside of album often used as primary album art

Professional ratings
Review scores
Source	Rating
AllMusic	3/5 stars
Christgau's Record Guide	B

Randy Newman Live is a live album by American singer Randy Newman. It is one of only two official live recordings he has released (the other was 2011's Live in London.) The album was recorded over three evenings between September 17 and 19, 1970 at the Bitter End, New York.

Originally intended as a radio promo recording to gain publicity, it is just over 28 minutes in length. The material is mostly taken from his debut album and 12 Songs plus a couple of rarities ("Maybe I'm Doing It Wrong" and "Tickle Me") and two songs from the as then unreleased Sail Away album ("Last Night I Had a Dream" and "Lonely at the Top").

"I'll Be Home" is a song that was also recorded (most notably) by Harry Nilsson (Nilsson Sings Newman, 1970), Barbra Streisand (Stoney End), Cass Elliott (Cass Elliot), The New Seekers (Beautiful People album), Anne Murray (Danny's Song), Tim Hardin and Mina (Mina, in Italian). Newman released a studio version on Little Criminals in 1977.

== Track listing ==
All songs written by Randy Newman

Side One

1. "Mama Told Me Not to Come" – 1:46
2. "Tickle Me" – 1:53
3. "I'll Be Home" – 2:40
4. "So Long Dad" – 1:41
5. "Livin' Without You" – 2:16
6. "Last Night I Had a Dream" – 1:43
7. "I Think It's Going to Rain Today" – 2:32

Side Two

1. "Lover's Prayer" – 1:52
2. "Maybe I'm Doing It Wrong" – 1:16
3. "Yellow Man" – 2:05
4. "Old Kentucky Home" – 1:33
5. "Cowboy" – 2:13
6. "Davy the Fat Boy" – 2:48
7. "Lonely at the Top" – 2:16

== Personnel ==
- Randy Newman - piano, vocals
- Lenny Waronker - producer
- Russ Titelman - producer
