= Thomas Rhea =

American politician from Kentucky

17th Kentucky State Treasurer
- In office 1912–1916
- Governor: James B. McCreary; Augustus O. Stanley
- Preceded by: Edwin Farley
- Succeeded by: Sherman Goodpaster

Personal details
- Born: December 29, 1871 Russellville, Kentucky
- Died: April 16, 1946 (aged 74) Russellville, Kentucky
- Resting place: Maple Grove Cemetery
- Party: Democratic
- Spouse: Lillian Clark
- Relations: Brother of John Stockdale Rhea
- Education: Bethel College

Thomas Stockdale Rhea (1871–1946) was a Democratic politician from the U.S. Commonwealth of Kentucky. He served as Kentucky State Treasurer in 1912 and was state highway commissioner in the administration of Governor Ruby Laffoon. Known as "The Sage of Russellville" or "The Gray Fox", Rhea was a powerful Democratic political boss in the state. He was an unsuccessful candidate for governor in 1935, losing to A. B. "Happy" Chandler in the Democratic primary.

== Early life ==
Thomas Rhea was born in Russellville, Kentucky on December 29, 1871. He was the son of Albert Gallatin and Jane (Stockdale) Rhea. His father Albert was a circuit court judge and served in both houses of the Kentucky General Assembly, and his brother John Stockdale Rhea served in the U.S. House of Representatives. His grandfather, Charles Rhea, owned and edited the first newspaper in Logan County.

Rhea obtained his early education in the area's public schools and at Bethel College in Russellville. He began the practice of law in Logan County. He was the president of Southern Deposit Bank and vice-president of the Bank of Russellville. In 1905, he was elected sheriff of Logan County. In January 1916, Rhea married Lillian Clark of Russellville. The couple had four children – Lillian Rhea Noe, Thomas Jr., Albert III, and Roland.

== Political career ==
Rhea's political career began in 1912, with his election as state treasurer. From 1912 until his death, he was a delegate to every Democratic National Convention and, as one of five floor leaders at the 1932 convention in Chicago, was particularly instrumental in securing the delegates from the conservative Southern states for liberal New York native Franklin D. Roosevelt.

During World War I, Rhea served on the United States Munitions Board. He failed in a bid to become state auditor in 1915, and his term as treasurer expired in 1916. In 1919, he announced that he would run for governor, but later withdrew. In 1924, Governor William J. Fields appointed him to the state workman's compensation board, where he served until 1927. Rhea served as campaign chairman for J. C. W. Beckham in the 1927 gubernatorial race, but Beckham lost to Flem D. Sampson. In 1928, he unsuccessfully sought the Democratic nomination for a seat in the U.S. House of Representatives.

At the 1931 state Democratic convention, Rhea backed Madisonville judge Ruby Laffoon as the party's nominee for Governor of Kentucky and state senator J. Woodford Howard for Lieutenant Governor of Kentucky. Laffoon easily won the gubernatorial nomination, but Howard lost the nomination for lieutenant governor to Happy Chandler, in part because Chandler received the backing of Rhea's political enemy, Ben Johnson. Laffoon and Chandler won the election, and Laffoon removed Johnson as state highway commissioner, appointing Rhea to that position.

Laffoon backed Rhea as his successor in 1935. When Rhea and Laffoon traveled to Washington, D.C. for a meeting with President Franklin D. Roosevelt, Lieutenant Governor Chandler was left as acting governor. Chandler called the General Assembly into a special session to vote on a mandatory primary bill. Laffoon returned to the state and tried to invalidate the call, but being stymied by the state courts, agreed to a primary bill that required a runoff if no candidate received a majority. Laffoon believed that aging J. C. W. Beckham would once again run against Rhea in the Democratic primary and that a double primary would wear him down.

Beckham did not run in the primary, however; Chandler did. Attacking Laffoon's administration, especially the sales tax he enacted, Chandler derided Rhea as "Sales Tax Tom" and promised to save the state from "Ruby, Rhea, and Ruin". Rhea brought in Earle C. Clements to manage his campaign. Promising a business-like administration that would include fiscal reforms, Rhea charged that Chandler was "the Shadow Man" for Ben Johnson. Laffoon sent state troops into pro-Chandler Harlan County, intimidating voters into voting for Rhea.

In the first round of balloting, Rhea achieved a 19,000-vote plurality over Chandler, but it was not enough to avoid a runoff. In the runoff, Chandler won by a vote of 260,573 to 234,124. After his primary loss, Rhea bolted the Democratic party and supported Republican King Swope for governor. In the general election, Chandler defeated Swope to win the governorship.

== Later life and death ==
Rhea became a mentor for his campaign manager, Earle Clements, who more or less led an anti-Chandler faction of the Democratic Party for the next 25 years. When Chandler challenged Sen. Alben Barkley in 1938, Rhea and Clements backed Barkley. Rhea also supported John Y. Brown, Sr. against Chandler ally Keen Johnson in the 1939 gubernatorial election.

In 1941, Rhea was again elected sheriff of Logan County and became chair of the state sheriffs board. When Clements out-organized Rhea and Second district U.S. Rep. B. M. Vincent in advance of the 1944 congressional primary, Rhea resigned his $150-per-month job as field secretary for Vincent, and Vincent withdrew from the race, handing the nomination to Clements. Rhea continued his service as sheriff through 1945. He died at his home in Russellville on April 16, 1946. He was buried in Maple Grove Cemetery in Russellville. On the occasion of his death, an article in the Louisville Courier-Journal opined that "he was a figure whose like will not be seen again in Kentucky politics."

Political offices
Preceded by Edwin Farley	Treasurer of Kentucky; 1912–1916	Succeeded by Sherman Goodpaster
