= 1935 Kentucky gubernatorial election =

- November 5, 1935
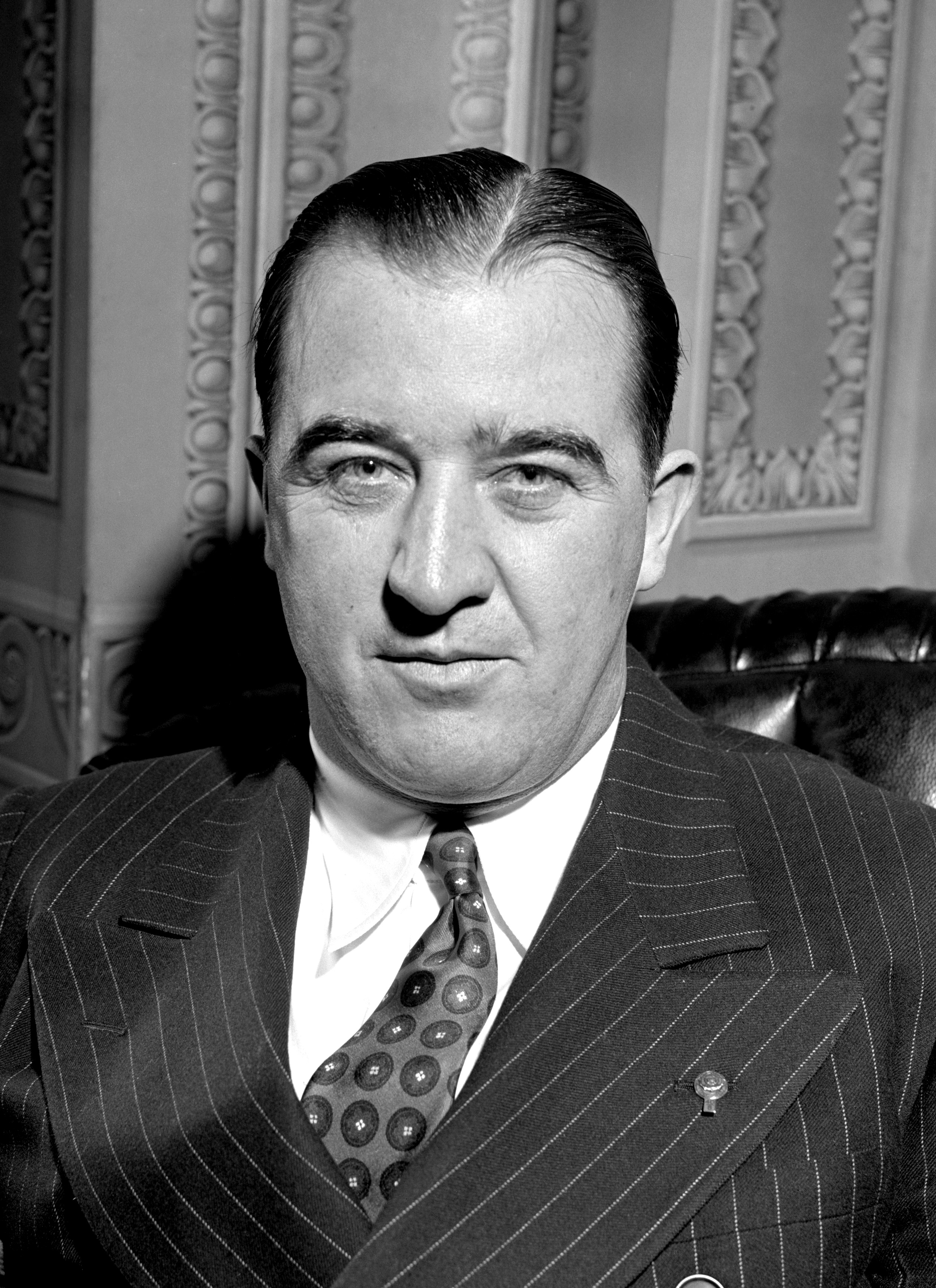

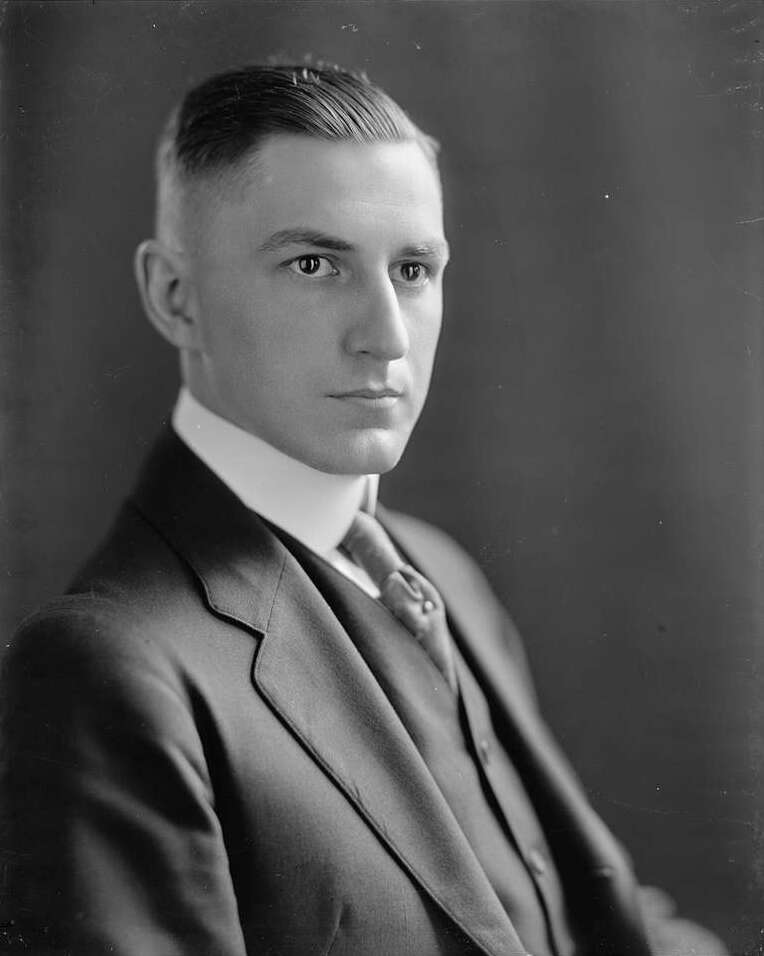
Nominee	Happy Chandler	King Swope
Party	Democratic	Republican
Popular vote	556,262	461,104
Percentage	54.45%	45.14%
- Chandler: 40–50% 50–60% 60–70% 70–80% 80–90% Swope: 50–60% 60–70% 70–80% 80–90%
Governor before election
Ruby Laffoon
Democratic
Elected Governor
Happy Chandler
Democratic

The 1935 Kentucky gubernatorial election was held on November 5, 1935. Democratic nominee Happy Chandler defeated Republican nominee King Swope with 54.45% of the vote. Ruby Laffoon, the incumbent Democratic Party Governor, was term limited.

== Primary elections ==
Primary elections were held on August 3, 1935.

=== Democratic primary ===
==== Candidates ====
- Happy Chandler, incumbent Lieutenant Governor
- Thomas Rhea, State Highway Commissioner
- Frederick A. Wallis
- Elam Huddleston
- Bailey P. Wootton

==== Results ====
Primary results by county Chandler: 30%–40%; 40%–50%; 50%–60%; 60%–70%; 70%–80%; Rhea: 40%–50%; 50%–60%; 60%–70%; 70%–80%; 80%–90%; 90%–100%; Other: 30%–40%; 40%–50%; 60%–70%; 80%–90%

Democratic primary results
Party	Candidate	Votes	%
Democratic	Thomas Rhea	203,010	45.12
Democratic	Happy Chandler	189,575	42.14
Democratic	Frederick A. Wallis	38,410	8.54
Democratic	Elam Huddleston	15,501	3.45
Democratic	Bailey P. Wootton	3,395	0.76
Total votes		449,891	100.00

Primary runoff results by county Chandler: 50%–60%; 60%–70%; 70%–80%; 80%–90%; Rhea: 50%–60%; 60%–70%; 70%–80%; 80%–90%; 90%–100%

Democratic primary runoff results
Party	Candidate	Votes	%
Democratic	Happy Chandler	260,573	52.67
Democratic	Thomas Rhea	234,124	47.33
Total votes		494,697	100.00

== General election ==
=== Candidates ===
Major party candidates

- Happy Chandler, Democratic
- King Swope, Republican

Other candidates

- W. E. Cissna, Prohibition
- W. A. Sandefur, Socialist
- Herman Hornung, Socialist Labor
- John J. Thobe, Cooperative Commonwealth

=== Results ===
1935 Kentucky gubernatorial election
Party	Candidate	Votes	%	±%
Democratic	A. B. Chandler	556,262	54.45	+0.17
Republican	King Swope	461,104	45.14	−0.29
Prohibition	W. E. Cissna	2,074	0.20	N/A
Socialist	W. A. Sandefur	842	0.08	−0.06
Socialist Labor	Herman Hornung	678	0.07	−0.08
Cooperative Commonwealth	John J. Thobe	551	0.05	N/A
Total votes		1,021,511	100.0	N/A
Democratic hold				
