= John R. Cash (album) =

Studio album by Johnny Cash
- Released: April 28, 1975
- Genre: Country
- Length: 28:37
- Label: Columbia
- Producer: Gary Klein

Johnny Cash chronology
Sings Precious Memories (1975)	John R. Cash (1975)	Look at Them Beans (1975)

Singles from John R. Cash
- 1. "The Lady Came from Baltimore" Released: September 1974; 2. "My Old Kentucky Home (Turpentine and Dandelion Wine)" Released: March 1975

John R. Cash is the 51st overall album by country singer Johnny Cash, released in 1975 on Columbia Records. It consists mostly of covers of other musicians' songs. The first track on the album, a song titled "My Old Kentucky Home", is not the state song of Kentucky, but a composition by Randy Newman which had been previously recorded by the Osborne Brothers in 1970 and Three Dog Night in 1972; Cash's version, like that of the Osborne Brothers five years previous, was released as the second single from the album, though the previously issued single "The Lady Came from Baltimore" had achieved greater success on the charts, reaching #14. The Cash original "Lonesome to the Bone" had previously appeared on Ragged Old Flag (1974) and would be re-recorded for Silver (1979).

Cash himself disliked John R. Cash, criticizing both the album and its production process in his 1997 autobiography, Cash: The Autobiography. He said the release was "[the CBS bosses'] idea of an album to restore [Cash's] sales potential", mentioning that the instrumental tracks were recorded separately from the vocals, a standard practice Cash didn't usually follow himself. In addition, this was the first Johnny Cash album on which his regular backing group, The Tennessee Three did not participate; instead, producer Gary Klein recruited a number of session musicians including members of Elvis Presley's TCB Band concert backing group, including guitarist James Burton, pianist Larry Muhoberac and drummer Ron Tutt.

Professional ratings
Review scores
Source	Rating
Allmusic	link

== Track listing ==
No.	Title	Writer(s)	Length
1.	"My Old Kentucky Home (Turpentine and Dandelion Wine)"	Randy Newman	2:49
2.	"Hard Times Comin'"	Jack Wesley Routh	2:40
3.	"The Lady Came from Baltimore"	Tim Hardin	2:43
4.	"Lonesome to the Bone"	Johnny Cash	2:34
5.	"The Night They Drove Old Dixie Down"	Robbie Robertson	3:25
6.	"Clean Your Own Tables"	Chip Taylor	3:36
7.	"Jesus Was Our Saviour and Cotton Was Our King"	Billy Joe Shaver	2:46
8.	"Reason to Believe"	Tim Hardin	2:08
9.	"Cocaine Carolina" (with David Allan Coe)	David Allan Coe	2:38
10.	"Smokey Factory Blues"	Albert Hammond, Mike Hazlewood	3:18

== Personnel ==
- Johnny Cash – vocals, guitar
- Marshall Grant – bass
- Bob Wootton – guitar
- Reggie Young – guitar
- Henry Strzelecki – bass guitar
- Kenny Malone – drums
- Shane Keister, Teddy Irwin – keyboards
- David Allan Coe – harmony vocals
- Jackie Ward, The Ron Hicklin Singers – backing vocals
- Harry Bluestone – strings concertmaster
- Frank DeCaro – contractor
- Ron Tutt, Reini Press, David Foster, Larry Muhoberac, Ron Elliot, Ry Cooder, James Burton, Russ Thelman, Jerry Cole, Victor Feldman, Joe Porcaro, Gene Estes, Nick DeCaro, Gene Cipriano – musicians in Los Angeles

Production and technical staff

- Produced by Gary Klein
- Arranged by Nick DeCaro
- Mixed by Al Schmitt
- Cover design: Bill Barnes and Julie Holiner
- Cover photo: Al Clayton
- Flyleaf photo: Emerson-Loew

== Charts ==
Singles – Billboard (United States)

Year	Single	Chart	Position
1974	"The Lady Came from Baltimore"	Country Singles	14
1975	"My Old Kentucky Home (Turpentine and Dandelion Wine)"	Country Singles	42
