= 12 Songs (Randy Newman album) =

Studio album by Randy Newman
- Released: April 1970
- Genre: Americana; roots rock; rock and roll
- Length: 29:51
- Label: Reprise
- Producer: Lenny Waronker

Randy Newman chronology
Randy Newman (1968)	12 Songs (1970)	Randy Newman Live (1971)

12 Songs is the second studio album by American singer-songwriter Randy Newman, released in April 1970 by Reprise Records. It features a swampy style of roots music with introspective, satirical songwriting. "Have You Seen My Baby?", the album's only single, was released in May.

When 12 Songs was first released, it was well received and has since garnered retrospective acclaim from critics such as Robert Christgau and Rolling Stone, both of whom cite it as one of the best albums of all time.

== Music and lyrics ==
According to Q, 12 Songs demonstrated Newman's eccentric mix of traditional pop song structures and his sardonic, satirical humor. AllMusic's Mark Deming said although his sense of humor seemed more caustic than on his self-titled debut album, Newman's "most mordant character studies" on 12 Songs "boast a recognizable humanity, which often make his subjects both pitiable and all the more loathsome." In the opinion of Robert Christgau, American songwriting in general is often "banal, prolix, and virtually solipsistic when it wants to be honest, merely banal when it doesn't", but Newman's truisms on the album are "always concise, never confessional", and unique:

"Speaking through recognizable American grotesques, he comments here on the generation gap (doomed), incendiary violence (fucked up but sexy), male and female (he identifies with the males, most of whom are losers and weirdos), racism (he's against it, but he knows its seductive power), and alienation (he's for it). Newman's music counterposes his indolent drawl—the voice of a Jewish kid from L.A. who grew up on Fats Domino—against an array of instrumental settings that on this record range from rock to bottleneck to various shades of jazz. And because his lyrics abjure metaphor and his music recalls commonplaces without repeating them, he can get away with the kind of calculated effects that destroy more straightforward meaning-mongers."

As with all of Newman's early albums, several of its songs had been previously recorded by other artists. In this case, "Mama Told Me Not to Come" had originally been recorded in 1967 by Eric Burdon, and that same year the Beau Brummels released their version of "My Old Kentucky Home". Three other songs originally appeared in versions by other artists just a few months prior to the LP release of 12 Songs: "Yellow Man" by Harry Nilsson on his February 1970 album Nilsson Sings Newman; "Have You Seen My Baby" by Fats Domino (as a 1969 single); and "Let's Burn Down the Cornfield" by Lou Rawls (the B-side to his 1970 R&B hit "You've Made Me So Very Happy").

== Critical reception ==
Professional ratings
Review scores
Source	Rating
AllMusic	5/5 stars
Christgau's Record Guide	A+
The Encyclopedia of Popular Music	4/5 stars
The Great Rock Discography	8/10
Music Story	5/5 stars
MusicHound Rock	3.5/5 stars
NME	6/10
Q	5/5 stars
The Rolling Stone Album Guide	5/5 stars
The Village Voice	A+

12 Songs received positive reviews from contemporary critics. According to Keith Phipps from The A.V. Club, Newman "began to gather a following beyond critics and fellow songwriters" with the album. Rolling Stone's Bruce Grimes gave it a rave review when it was released, hailing the album as "the full emergence of a leading innovator in rock and roll". In The Village Voice, Christgau called it the best record of 1970, finding the songwriting, production, and performances superior and "more accessible than the great-but-weird album that preceded it".

Years later in Christgau's Record Guide: Rock Albums of the Seventies (1981), Christgau called 12 Songs "a perfect album". Deming later said it was Newman's "first great album, and ... still one of his finest moments on record." Yahoo! Music's Dave DiMartino observed some of Newman's "best-known earlier material" on the album, which he felt featured "a stellar trio of guitarists, including Ry Cooder, Clarence White and (The Beau Brummels) Ron Elliott." Mojo commended Newman for replacing "the orchestra with an Americana rock rhythm section", while writing that "the more conventional presentation found Newman a college audience attuned to his wry singularity".

In 2000 it was voted number 691 in Colin Larkin's All Time Top 1000 Albums.

In 2003, 12 Songs was ranked number 354 on Rolling Stone's list of the 500 greatest albums of all time, and at 356 in a 2012 revised list. Rob Sheffield, writing in The Rolling Stone Album Guide (2004), cited it as the moment "where Newman got loose as a rock & roller, ditching the complex orchestrations for a bluesy, easy-swinging satire of America".

== Track listing ==
All songs written by Randy Newman except where noted.

Side one

1. "Have You Seen My Baby?" – 2:32
2. "Let's Burn Down the Cornfield" – 3:03
3. "Mama Told Me Not to Come" – 2:12
4. "Suzanne" – 3:15
5. "Lover's Prayer" – 1:55
6. "Lucinda" – 2:40
7. "Underneath the Harlem Moon" (Mack Gordon, Harry Revel) – 1:52

Side two

1. "Yellow Man" – 2:19
2. "Old Kentucky Home" – 2:40
3. "Rosemary" – 2:08
4. "If You Need Oil" – 3:00
5. "Uncle Bob's Midnight Blues" – 2:15

== Personnel ==
Musicians

- Randy Newman – vocals, piano
- Clarence White – lead guitar, B-Bender electric guitar
- Ron Elliott – rhythm guitar
- Ry Cooder – slide guitar
- Lyle Ritz – bass guitar, double bass
- Jim Gordon, Gene Parsons – drums
- Roy Harte, Milt Holland – percussion
- Al McKibbon – double bass

Production

- Lenny Waronker – producer
- Jack Nitzsche – co-producer on "Let's Burn Down the Cornfield"
- Doug Botnick – engineer
- Lee Herschberg – engineer
- Ed Thrasher – artwork
- Tony Newman – cover photography

== Bibliography ==
- Larkin, Colin, ed. (2006). The Encyclopedia of Popular Music. Vol. 10 (4th ed.). Oxford University Press. ISBN 0-19-531373-9.
- Perone, James E. (October 31, 2012). The Album: A Guide to Pop Music's Most Provocative, Influential, and Important Creations. ABC-CLIO. ISBN 978-0313379062.
- Sheffield, Rob; et al. (2004). Brackett, Nathan; Hoard, Christian (eds.). The New Rolling Stone Album Guide. Completely Revised and Updated 4th Edition. Simon & Schuster. ISBN 0-7432-0169-8.
- Strong, Martin C. (October 21, 2004). The Great Rock Discography: Complete Discographies Listing Every Track Recorded by More Than 1,200 Artists (7th ed.). Canongate U.S. ISBN 1841956155.
