= King Swope =

American politician (1893–1961)

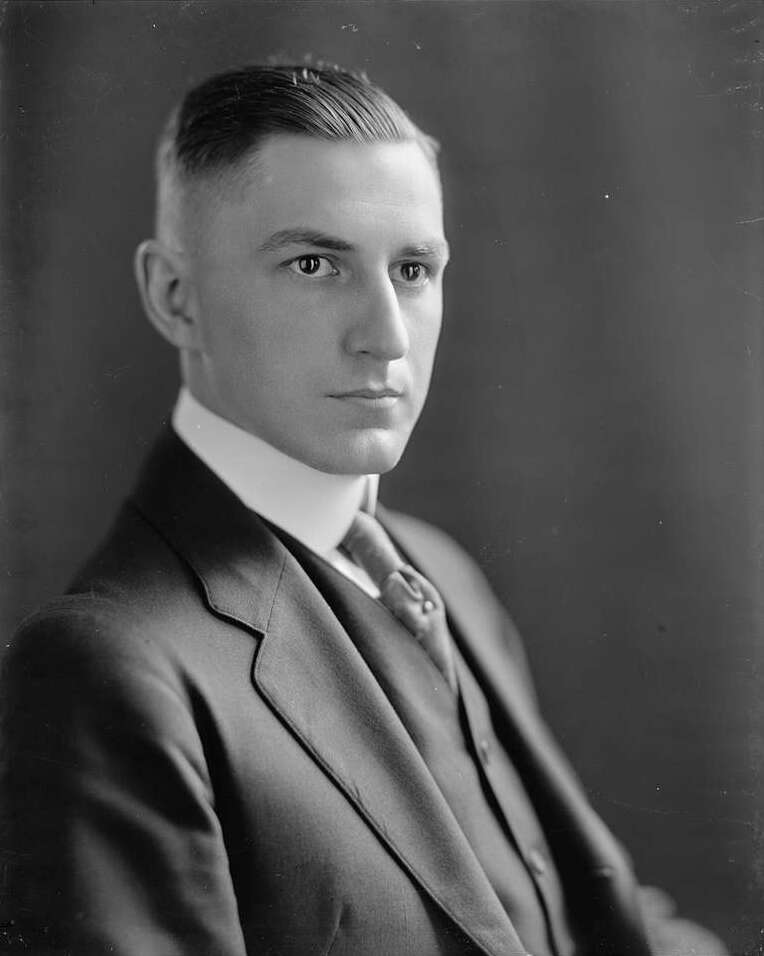
- King Swope, c. 1919

Member of the U.S. House of Representatives from Kentucky's 8th district
- In office August 1, 1919 – March 3, 1921
- Preceded by: Harvey Helm
- Succeeded by: Ralph Waldo Emerson Gilbert

Personal details
- Born: August 10, 1893 Danville, Kentucky, U.S.
- Died: April 23, 1961 (aged 67) Lexington, Kentucky, U.S.
- Resting place: Lexington Cemetery
- Party: Republican
- Education: Centre College; University of Kentucky
- Profession: Lawyer

Military service
- Allegiance: United States of America
- Rank: Captain
- Battles/wars: World War I

King Swope (August 10, 1893 – April 23, 1961) was an American attorney and politician who served as a U.S. representative from Kentucky.

== Biography ==
Born in Danville, Kentucky, Swope earned a B.A. from Centre College in 1914 and a law degree from the University of Kentucky at Lexington in 1916. He was admitted to the bar in 1915 and practiced law in Lexington.

Swope enlisted and served during World War I as captain of infantry. He was elected as a Republican to the 66th U.S. Congress by special election, to fill the vacancy caused by the death of Harvey Helm (August 1, 1919 – March 3, 1921). Swope was an unsuccessful candidate for reelection to the 67th U.S. Congress in 1920.

Swope was appointed aide-de-camp with the rank of colonel on the staff of Governor Edwin P. Morrow in 1919, before resuming the practice of law. He was the chairman of the Republican executive committee of Fayette County, Kentucky, from 1928 to 1931, and was appointed and subsequently elected a judge of the circuit court of the 22nd judicial district of Kentucky and served from 1931 to 1940.

Swope was the unsuccessful Republican nominee for Governor of Kentucky in 1935 and 1939. He was a delegate to the Republican National Convention in 1936, 1940, and 1944, and was chairman of the Republican State convention in 1936. He was also a member of the judicial council of Kentucky from 1931 to 1940.

In 1918, he married Mary Richards.

Swope died in Lexington, Kentucky, in 1961 and was buried at Lexington Cemetery.

U.S. House of Representatives
Preceded by Harvey Helm	Member of the U.S. House of Representatives from Kentucky's 8th congressional district August 1, 1919 – March 3, 1921	Succeeded by Ralph Waldo Emerson Gilbert
Party political offices
Preceded by William B. Harrison	Republican nominee for Governor of Kentucky; 1935, 1939	Succeeded by Simeon S. Willis
