= Alan Price discography =

- Studio albums: 17
- EPs: 1
- Soundtrack albums: 3
- Live albums: 3
- Compilation albums: 15
- Singles: 49

This is the discography of English musician Alan Price.

== Albums ==
=== Studio albums ===
Title	Album details	Peak chart positions	
Title	Album details	UK	US
The Price to Play (as the Alan Price Set)	Released: December 1966; Label: Decca; Formats: LP	—	—
A Price on His Head (as the Alan Price Set)	Released: December 1967; Label: Decca; Formats: LP	—	—
Fame & Price / Price & Fame / Together (with Georgie Fame)	Released: 1971; Label: CBS; Formats: LP, MC	—	—
Savaloy Dip	Released: 1974; Label: Reprise; Formats: 8-track; Accidentally released, recalled and not officially released until 2016	—	—
Between Today and Yesterday	Released: May 1974; Label: Warner Bros.; Formats: LP, MC, 8-track	9	—
Metropolitan Man	Released: May 1975; Label: Polydor; Formats: LP, MC, 8-track	—	—
Shouts Across the Street	Released: December 1976; Label: Polydor; Formats: LP, MC, 8-track	—	—
Two of a Kind (with Rob Hoeke)	Released: November 1977; Label: Vertigo; Formats: LP, MC	—	—
Alan Price	Released: October 1977; Label: Jet; Formats: LP, MC, 8-track	—	187
England My England	Released: October 1978; Label: Jet; Formats: LP, MC; Released in North America as Lucky Day	—	—
Rising Sun	Released: 11 April 1980; Label: Jet; Formats: LP, MC	—	—
Geordie Roots & Branches	Released: November 1982; Label: MWM; Formats: LP, MC	—	—
Travellin' Man	Released: March 1986; Label: Trojan; Formats: LP	—	—
Liberty	Released: 7 August 1989; Label: Ariola; Formats: CD, LP, MC	—	—
Covers (with the Electric Blues Company)	Released: 1994; Label: A P; Formats: CD	—	—
A Gigster's Life for Me (with the Electric Blues Company)	Released: 1996; Label: Indigo Recordings; Formats: LP, MC	—	—
Based on a True Story	Released: August 2002; Label: A P; Formats: CD	—	—
"—" denotes releases that did not chart or were not released in that territory.

=== Live albums ===
Title	Album details
Performing Price	Released: December 1975; Label: Polydor; Formats: 2xLP
A Rock 'n' Roll Night at the Royal Court Theatre	Released: 1980; Label: Key; Formats: LP
Live in Concert	Released: March 1993; Label: Merlin; Formats: CD

=== Soundtrack albums ===
Title	Album details	Peak chart positions			
Title	Album details	AUS	IT	NOR	US
O Lucky Man!	Released: May 1973; Label: Warner Bros.; Formats: LP, MC, 8-track	34	20	6	117
Andy Capp (with Trevor Peacock)	Released: 1982; Label: Key; Formats: LP; Cast recording of the musical of the same name	—	—	—	—
The Whales of August	Released: October 1987; Label: Varèse Sarabande; Formats: CD, LP	—	—	—	—
"—" denotes releases that did not chart or were not released in that territory.

=== Compilation albums ===
Title	Album details
The Price Is Right	Released: February 1968; Label: Parrot; Formats: LP
The World of Alan Price	Released: July 1970; Label: Decca; Formats: LP
Focus on Alan Price	Released: October 1979; Label: Decca; Formats: 2xLP
The Best of Alan Price	Released: August 1984; Label: Action Replay; Formats: LP, MC
Unforgettable – 16 Golden Classics	Released: 1986; Label: Castle Communications; Formats: LP
The Alan Price Collection	Released: July 1986; Label: Music for Pleasure; Formats: LP
The Rest of & the Best of Alan Price	Released: 1989; Label: Action Replay; Formats: CD, MC
The Greatest Hits in Concert	Released: 16 March 1992; Label: Rialto; Formats: CD, MC
The Best of Alan Price	Released: 1993; Label: Music Club; Formats: CD
Anthology	Released: July 1997; Label: Snapper Music; Formats: 2xCD
I Put a Spell on You – The Decca/Deram Singles A's And B's	Released: 2000; Label: Connoisseur Collection; Formats: CD
Geordie Boy – The Anthology	Released: October 2002; Label: Castle Music; Formats: 2xCD
Just for You – The Best of Alan Price	Released: August 2003; Label: Delta Music; Formats: CD
The House That Jack Built – The Complete 60s Sessions	Released: 18 April 2005; Label: Castle Music; Formats: 2xCD
Twice The Price – The Decca Recordings	Released: 28 April 2017; Label: Edsel; Formats: 3xCD

== EPs ==
Title	EP details
The Amazing Alan Price	Released: 1967; Label: Decca; Formats: 7"

== Singles ==
Title	Year	Peak chart positions										Album
Title	Year	UK	AUS	AUT	BEL (FLA)	CAN	GER	IRE	NL	NZ	US	Album
As the Alan Price Set
"Any Day Now (My Wild Beautiful Bird)"	1965	—	—	—	—	—	—	—	—	—	—	Non-album singles
"I Put a Spell on You"	1966	9	35	—	—	—	—	—	10	15	80	Non-album singles
"Hi-Lili, Hi-Lo"	1966	11	3	—	8	—	26	—	8	—	—	The Price to Play
"Willow Weep for Me"	1966	59 (Note: Chart position is from the official UK "Breakers List".)	—	—	—	—	—	—	18	—	—	Non-album singles
"Simon Smith and the Amazing Dancing Bear"	1967	4	49	—	—	—	—	13	—	12	—	Non-album singles
"The House That Jack Built"	1967	4	45	—	—	—	38	12	18	9	—	A Price on His Head
"Shame"	1967	45	—	—	—	—	—	—	— (Note: "Shame" did not enter the Dutch Single Top 20, but did peak at number 33 on the Dutch Top 40.)	—	—	Non-album singles
"Don't Stop the Carnival"	1968	13	—	20	—	—	—	—	— (Note: "Don't Stop the Carnival" did not enter the Dutch Single Top 20, but did peak at number 34 on the Dutch Top 40.)	—	—	Non-album singles
"When I Was a Cowboy"	1968	—	—	—	—	—	—	—	—	—	—	Non-album singles
"Love Story"	1968	56	—	—	—	—	—	—	—	—	—	Non-album singles
As Alan Price
"Not Born to Follow" (Note: "Not Born to Follow" was only released as a single in the US. It was released prior to the release of the Alan Price Set's "When I Was a Cowboy" and "Love Story".)	1968	—	—	—	—	—	—	—	—	—	—	Non-album singles
"The Trimdon Grange Explosion"	1969	—	—	—	—	—	—	—	—	—	—	Non-album singles
"Falling in Love Again" (Note: "Falling in Love Again" was only released as a single in the US.)	1969	—	—	—	—	—	—	—	—	—	—	Non-album singles
"Sunshine and Rain (The Name of the Game)"	1970	—	—	—	—	—	—	—	18	—	—	Non-album singles
"Rosetta" (with Georgie Fame)	1971	11	91	—	1	—	43	—	3	—	—	Fame & Price / Price & Fame / Together
"Follow Me" (with Georgie Fame)	1971	—	—	—	—	—	—	—	—	—	—	Non-album singles
"Don't Hit Me When I'm Down" (with Georgie Fame)	1973	—	—	—	—	—	—	—	—	—	—	Non-album singles
"Poor People"	1973	—	—	—	—	63	—	—	—	—	—	O Lucky Man!
"O Lucky Man!"	1973	—	—	—	—	—	—	—	—	—	—	O Lucky Man!
"Jarrow Song"	1974	6	—	—	—	—	—	5	—	20	—	Between Today and Yesterday
"Left Over People" (Note: "Left Over People" was only released as a single in France.)	1974	—	—	—	—	—	—	—	—	—	—	Between Today and Yesterday
"In Times Like These"	1974	—	—	—	—	—	—	—	—	—	—	Between Today and Yesterday
"Mama Divine"	1975	—	—	—	—	—	—	—	—	—	—	Metropolitan Man
"Papers"	1975	—	—	—	—	—	—	—	—	—	—	Metropolitan Man
"Nobody Can" (Note: "Nobody Can" was only released as a single in France.)	1975	—	—	—	—	—	—	—	—	—	—	Metropolitan Man
"Goodnight Irene"	1976	—	—	—	—	—	—	—	—	—	—	Non-album singles
"Kissed Away the Night"	1976	—	—	—	—	—	—	—	—	—	—	Non-album singles
"Meet the People"	1977	—	—	—	—	—	—	—	—	—	—	Non-album singles
"I've Been Hurt"	1977	—	—	—	—	—	—	—	—	—	—	Alan Price
"I Almost Lost My Mind" (with Rob Hoeke) (Note: "I Almost Lost My Mind" was only released as a single in the Netherlands.)	1977	—	—	—	—	—	—	—	—	—	—	Two of a Kind
"Just for You"	1978	43	—	—	—	—	—	—	—	—	—	Alan Price
"I Wanna Dance"	1978	—	—	—	—	—	—	—	—	—	—	Alan Price
"I Love You Too"	1978	—	—	—	—	—	—	—	—	—	—	England My England
"Baby of Mine"	1979	32	—	—	—	—	—	—	—	—	—	England My England
"England My England"	1979	—	—	—	—	—	—	—	—	—	—	England My England
"This Is Your Lucky Day"	1979	—	—	—	—	—	—	—	—	—	—	England My England
"Love You True"	1980	—	—	—	—	—	—	—	—	—	—	Rising Sun
"The House of the Rising Sun"	1980	—	—	—	—	—	—	—	—	—	—	Rising Sun
"When My Little Girl Is Smiling"	1980	—	—	—	—	—	—	—	—	—	—	A Rock 'n' Roll Night at the Royal Court Theatre
"Beat Out Dat Rhythm on a Drum"	1981	—	—	—	—	—	—	—	—	—	—	Non-album singles
"Love Is a Miracle"	1981	—	—	—	—	—	—	—	—	—	—	Non-album singles
"Down at the World's End"	1981	—	—	—	—	—	—	—	—	—	—	Non-album singles
"I Don't Feel No Pain No More (Time and Tide)"	1982	—	—	—	—	—	—	—	—	—	—	The Plague Dogs (soundtrack)
"Clair de Lune"	1984	159	—	—	—	—	—	—	—	—	—	Non-album single
"Guess Who"	1986	—	—	—	—	—	—	—	—	—	—	Travellin' Man
"Jarrow Song '86"	1986	—	—	—	—	—	—	—	—	—	—	Non-album single
"Changes"	1988	54	—	—	—	—	29	—	—	—	—	Liberty
"Fool's in Love"	1989	—	—	—	—	—	—	—	—	—	—	Liberty
"Liberty"	1989	—	—	—	—	—	—	—	—	—	—	Liberty
"—" denotes releases that did not chart or were not released in that territory.
