= The Randy Newman Songbook Vol. 3 =

Studio album by Randy Newman
- Released: September 23, 2016
- Studio: Conway, Hollywood, California
- Genre: Singer-songwriter
- Label: Nonesuch
- Producer: Lenny Waronker, Mitchell Froom

Randy Newman chronology
The Randy Newman Songbook Vol. 2 (2011)	The Randy Newman Songbook Vol. 3 (2016)	Dark Matter (2017)

Professional ratings
Review scores
Source	Rating
AllMusic	3.5/5 stars
Pitchfork	7.5/10

The Randy Newman Songbook Vol. 3 is the fourteenth studio and third songbook album by American musician Randy Newman and contains newly recorded, stripped-down versions of some of his best known songs, performed by him singing and playing the piano without accompaniment.

The album was also released as part of a four-LP, vinyl-only, limited edition box set on September 23, 2016 including Volume 1 and Volume 2 of the Songbook and five bonus tracks. On December 16, 2016, a three-CD box set was released comprising all three Songbook albums and five bonus tracks.

== Track listing ==
All tracks composed and arranged by Randy Newman.

1. "Short People"
2. "Mama Told Me Not to Come"
3. "Love Story"
4. "Burn On"
5. "You've Got a Friend in Me"
6. "Rollin'"
7. "Guilty"
8. "Simon Smith and the Amazing Dancing Bear"
9. "Davy the Fat Boy"
10. "Red Bandana"
11. "Old Man"
12. "Real Emotional Girl"
13. "I Love to See You Smile"
14. "I Love L.A."
15. "Bad News from Home"
16. "I'll Be Home"

=== September 2016 vinyl box set bonus tracks ===
1. "Feels Like Home"
2. "A Wedding in Cherokee Country"
3. "Family Album: Homage to Alfred, Emil and Lionel Newman"
4. "I'm Dreaming"
5. "Wandering Boy"

=== December 2016 CD box set bonus tracks ===
1. "Feels Like Home"
2. "A Wedding in Cherokee Country"
3. "Family Album: Homage to Alfred, Emil and Lionel Newman"
4. "A Few Words in Defense of Our Country"
5. "I'm Dreaming"

== Personnel ==
Randy Newman – vocals, piano
