= Shame (Alan Price song) =

- French single sleeve

Single by the Alan Price Set
- B-side: "Don't Do That Again"
- Released: 3 November 1967
- Studio: Pye, London
- Length: 2:48
- Label: Decca
- Songwriter: Alan Price
- Producer: Alan Price

The Alan Price Set singles chronology
| "The House That Jack Built" (1967) | "Shame" (1967) | "Don't Stop the Carnival" (1968) |

Licensed audio
- "Shame" on YouTube

"Shame" is a song written and released by Alan Price in 1967. Price wrote, arranged, and produced "Shame" at Pye Studios in London. Musically, it features brass, organ and piano in the arrangement, with lyrics inspired by Price's early life. "Shame" was released as the Alan Price Set's seventh UK single on 3 November 1967 through Decca Records in the UK, and peaked at number 45 on the Record Retailer singles chart, a considerable chart failure compared to his earlier two singles. Though Price was critical of the single, it received praise in the British music press, with most journalists focusing on the strength of Price's production.

== Recording and composition ==
As with his previous single "The House That Jack Built", "Shame" was composed, arranged, produced, and published by Alan Price. According to Andrew Harvey of the Norwich Evening News, "Shame" appeared to be a continuation of "Who Cares?", which had appeared as the B-side of "The House That Jack Built". The song was recorded at Pye Records' studio in London with Barry Ainsworth engineering. Price double-tracked his vocal performance on the song, as did he for his keyboard performance, playing both piano and organ, which were arranged in a jazzy vein. Musically, "Shame" features brass, organ and piano prominently in its' arrangement.

Lyrically, Price related them to his early life and experiences, with a line about a white-collar job being a "promised land" being influenced by Price's early career as a tax assessor. In contrast to Price's two earlier singles, "Shame" lacks an element of comedy, instead being "very much true to life" "about the way we adopt a two-faced attitude in certain situations, and then breathe a sigh of relief when we're on our own". Critic Peter Robinson of The Argus identifies the lyric as a "comment on life", featuring characters such as "Jenny on the switchboard" and people for whom "life has shut the door". The staff reviewer for the Bucks Examiner wrote that the lyrics were "almost Kink-ish" in content. John Morthland of Phonograph Record instead felt the lyrics were "vaguely surreal" which were "obligatory for the times", but felt they "up the ante" by being coherent.

== Release and commercial performance ==
Decca Records released "Shame" as the Alan Price Set's seventh single in the UK on 3 November 1967, with the self-penned song "Don't Do That Again" as the B-side. The Alan Price Set promoted the release on various television and radio shows, including Saturday Club (4 November), The Des O'Connor Show (16 November), The Joe Loss Show (1 December), Crackerjack! (8 December), and The Val Doonican Show (23 December). "Shame" entered the Record Retailer singles chart at number 50 on 21 November 1967, before peaking at number 45 the following week. It spent only two weeks on the charts. By contrast, his previous two singles "Simon Smith and the Amazing Dancing Bear" and "The House That Jack Built" were top-five hits and had spent ten or more week in the top-50.

Price was unsure of the commercial success of "Shame" upon release, but nonetheless became disappointed when it failed to become a big hit. Reflecting on the single's failure to Beat Instrumental's Pete Goodman, Price stated that "everybody said it was a good record, and that's about all you can do". Price felt that the only thing he "lost out on" was the "money on the original session". In February 1968, Price reflected to Keith Altham of the New Musical Express that "it just wasn't good enough", and that there "was a miserable drone" when he overdubbed his vocals onto the backing track, which he felt was excellent. "Don't Do That Again" was featured on the Alan Price Set's second studio album A Price on His Head, which Decca released on 8 December 1967. "Shame" was left out of the album, and instead first appeared on the Parrot Records compilation This Price is Right in the US during February 1968.

== Critical reception ==
"Shame" received positive reviews in the British music press. Writing for Disc and Music Echo, journalist Penny Valentine believed it was a "much better record in all ways" compared to "The House That Jack Built". She praised Price's production as "far more solid" and more "definitve" than the previous single, and also noted his organ solo as "great". She believed it was "so nice" to have Price "back where he belongs" with a "very good record" that she hoped was a hit as Price deserved them. For Melody Maker's Blind Date feature, singer Dave Dee felt that "Shame" was reminiscent of Simon Dupree and the Big Sound, declaring it to become a "big hit". Similarly, that magazine's journalist Nick Jones hoped the single would become a "huge hit", opining that Price had found a "really beautiful formula" with the song, praising the song's lyrics.

Derek Johnson of the New Musical Express wrote Price deserved credit "in all departments" for writing, arranging and producing the single, praising his performance as "vital and vigorous", with the Set "doing him justice" with their backing. He opined that Price had his fingers "very firmly planted on the pulse of the teenage fan", noting it as a "very commercial disc" which he felt deservedly was bound to succeed. Similarly, Peter Jones of Record Mirror wrote that Price had done it again, noting the production, song, piano, vocal performance and idea as "great". He believed that the song "insinuates itself with tremendous power" right from the start, and singled it out as his record of the week.

== Charts ==
Chart performance for "Shame"
| Chart (1967–1968) | Peak position |
|---|---|
| France (SNICOP Top 100) | 22 |
| Netherlands (Veronica Top 40) | 33 |
| UK (Record Retailer Top 50) | 45 |

== Sources ==
- Ferment, Fabrice (2001). 40 ans de tubes 1960-2000: Les meilleures ventes de 45 tours & CD Singles [40 Years of Hits 1960-2000: Bestselling 45 RPM & CD Singles Hardcover – October 23, 2001] (in French) (1st ed.). France: Larivière. ISBN 978-291-42056-03.
- Robinson, Alan (2001). A Price on His Head (CD liner notes). United Kingdom: Edsel. EDCD 681.
- Welch, Chris (1995). A Price on His Head (CD liner notes). Germany: Repertoire. REP 4612-WY.
