= A Man Without a Dream =

"A Man Without a Dream" is a song written by Gerry Goffin and Carole King, and recorded by the following artists:

- The B side of the 1966 song "On This Side of Goodbye" by The Righteous Brothers
- From the 1969 album, Instant Replay by The Monkees
- The B side of the 1967 song “Tears, Tears, Tears” on the Atco Records label
