= Harps and Angels =

Studio album by Randy Newman
- Released: August 5, 2008
- Recorded: Fall 2006–2008
- Genre: Jazz, soul
- Length: 34:52
- Label: Nonesuch
- Producer: Mitchell Froom, Lenny Waronker

Randy Newman chronology
The Randy Newman Songbook Vol. 1 (2003)	Harps and Angels (2008)	The Randy Newman Songbook Vol. 2 (2011)

Harps and Angels is the twelfth studio album by American musician Randy Newman. It was released on August 5, 2008, and was produced by Mitchell Froom and Lenny Waronker. It contains two updated versions of previously released compositions. “Feels Like Home” originally appeared on his musical album Randy Newman's Faust, and a demo of Cats Don't Dance's deleted song, "Laugh and Be Happy" was included in the box set Guilty: 30 Years of Randy Newman.

== Reception ==
Professional ratings
Aggregate scores
Source	Rating
Metacritic	86/100
Review scores
Source	Rating
AllMusic	4/5 stars
The A.V. Club	B+
Entertainment Weekly	B+
Mojo	4/5 stars
MSN Music (Consumer Guide)	A
The Observer	5/5 stars
PopMatters	9/10
Record Collector	5/5 stars
Rolling Stone	4/5 stars
Uncut	4/5 stars

Harps and Angels debuted on the UK Albums Chart at No. 46. It placed 12th in the 2008 Pazz & Jop Critics Poll, and it made No. 48 in Q's 50 Best Albums of the Year 2008. The song "A Few Words in Defense of Our Country" was named the sixth best song of the 2000s decade by music critic Robert Christgau.

== Track listing ==
All songs written and arranged by Randy Newman

1. "Harps and Angels" - 5:07
2. "Losing You" - 2:41
3. "Laugh and Be Happy" - 2:17
4. "A Few Words in Defense of Our Country" - 4:14
5. "A Piece of the Pie" - 2:41
6. "Easy Street" - 3:14
7. "Korean Parents" - 3:26
8. "Only a Girl" - 2:45
9. "Potholes" - 3:39
10. "Feels Like Home" - 4:37

== Musicians ==
- Randy Newman - pianist and bandleader
- Greg Cohen - bass
- Steve Donnelly - guitar
- Pete Thomas - drums
- Greg Leisz - pedal steel guitar and acoustic slide guitar
- Mitchell Froom - keyboard and organ
- Violins: Roger Wilkie (concertmaster), Eun-Mee Ahn, Jacqueline Brand, Kevin Connolly, Joel Derouin, Julie Ann Gigante, Natalie Leggett, Helen Nightengale, Alyssa Park, Sara Parkins, Katia Popov, Rafael Rishik, Anatoly Rosinsky, Marc Sazer, Tereza Stanislav, Lisa M. Sutton, Sarah Thornblade, Irina Voloshina
- Violas: Brian Dembow (first viola), Robert Berg, Thomas Diener, Steven Gordon, Roland Kato, Darrin McCann, Victoria Miskolczy, Michael Nowak, Shanti Randall, David Walther
- Violoncelli: Dennis Karmazyn (first cello), Antony Cooke, Steve Erdody, Christine Ermacoff, Armen Ksajikian, Andrew Shulman, David Speltz, Cecelia Tsan
- Bass violins: Michael Valerio (first bass violin), Drew Dembowski, Edward Meares, Susan Ranney
- Flutes: James Walker, Norda Mullen, Geraldine Rotella, David Shostac
- Clarinets: Gary Boyver, Stuart Clark, Donald Foster, Marty Krystall
- Saxophones: Daniel Higgins, Gary Foster, Greg Huckins, Bill Liston, Brian Scanlon
- Oboes: Thomas Boyd, Leslie Reed
- Bassoons: Kenneth Munday, Michael O'Donovan, Judith Farmer
- French horns: James Thatcher, Mark Adams, Richard Todd
- Trumpets: Warren Luening, Malcolm McNab, Daniel Fornero, Jon Lewis, Timothy Morrison
- Trombones: William Booth, Bruce Fowler, Alesander Iles, William Reichenbach, George Thatcher
- Tuba: Doug Tornquist
- Percussion (including mallets): Alan Estes, Gregory Goodall
- Harps: Jo Ann Turovsky, Allison Allport
- Accordion: Frank Marocco
- Background vocals: Carmen Carter, Tim Davis, Luana Jackman, Steve Jackson, Rick Logan, Susan Stevens Logan, Fletcher Sheridan, Oren Waters, Terry Woods

== Album credits ==
- Produced by Mitchell Froom and Lenny Waronker
- Engineered by David Boucher
- Recorded at Sunset Sound Studios in Hollywood and at The Newman Stage, Twentieth Century Fox Studios in Beverly Hills
- Mixed at Tea Time Studios in Santa Monica
- Mastered by Robert C. Ludwig at Gateway Mastering Studios in Portland, Maine
- Randy Newman's personal manager: Cathy Kerr Management, Inc. of Los Angeles
- Angry Belgians on "A Piece of the Pie": Kathie Van Kerckhoven and Jeremy Altervain
- Happy immigrants on "Laugh and Be Happy": Los Amigos Locos del Este
- Orchestral contractor: Sandy DeCrescent
- Music preparation: Jo Ann Kane Music Services
- Vocal contractor: Luana Jackman
- Album photography: Autumn De Wilde
- Stock photography for booklet by Jupiterimages (page 8), Perry Mastrovito (outside inlay), and Photo 24 (inside inlay)
- Art direction and design: Barbara De Wilde
- Production manager for Nonesuch Records: Eli Cane
- Editorial coordinator for Nonesuch Records: Ronen Givony
- Executive in charge of production for Nonesuch Records: Karina Beznicki
- Executive producer: Robert Hurwitz
