= I Wanna Dance =

I Wanna Dance may refer to:

== Albums ==
- I Wanna Dance, 1978 album by Baby Washington
- I Wanna Dance, 2014 album by Đông Nhi, or the title song

== Songs ==
- I Wanna Dance (Donghae & Eunhyuk song), 2013
- I Wanna Dance (Melodie MC song), 1993
- "I Wanna Dance", a 1978 single by Alan Price
- "I Wanna Dance", a 1984 single by The Cool Notes
- "I Wanna Dance", a 1993 song by Michael Learns to Rock from the album Colours
- "I Wanna Dance", a 2019 single by Jonas Blue from the album Blue
- "I Wanna Dance (May I Have This Dance)", a 1974 song from John Holt from the album The Further You Look

== See also ==
- "I Wanna Dance Wit' Choo (Doo Dat Dance)", a 1975 single by Disco-Tex and the Sex-O-Lettes
- "I Wanna Dance with Somebody (Who Loves Me)", a 1987 single by Whitney Houston
