= The House That Jack Built (Alan Price song) =

- West German picture sleeve

Single by Alan Price Set

from the album A Price on His Head
- B-side: "Who Cares"
- Released: 28 July 1967
- Genre: Pop
- Length: 3:16
- Label: Decca
- Songwriter: Alan Price
- Producer: Alan Price

Alan Price Set singles chronology
"Simon Smith and the Amazing Dancing Bear" (1967)	"The House That Jack Built" (1967)	"Shame" (1967)

"The House That Jack Built" is a song written by Alan Price and recorded by the Alan Price Set. It was Price's first self-composed single, as well as his first self-produced recording. Released by Decca, the song reached number four on the UK Singles Chart in September 1967. It was included on the Alan Price Set's second album A Price on His Head (1967).

== Background and composition ==
The song was significant in Price's artistic development; while his previous singles had been compositions by outside writers such as Randy Newman, Price wrote, arranged and produced "The House That Jack Built". Price funded the song's recording with the profits of his previous hit "Simon Smith and the Amazing Dancing Bear" and published it through his own Alan Price Music Limited. Lyrically, the song concerns the bizarre hobbies of people living in one house. Having composed the melody first, Price struggled with the lyrics and resolved to make them "as ridiculous as possible", describing the final lyric as "really just nonsense poetry about all the daft things that people do". Penny Valentine of Disc and Music Echo believed the song to be about an asylum, while Keith Altham of New Musical Express implied it was a comment on hippies and counterculture.

To provide a "different sounding solo", Price added a speeded-up saxophone solo to the recording. This was commented on by Crotus Pike in his 1968 article on sound effects in pop for Beat Instrumental, commenting: "It's amazing the different sound which you can get purely by altering the speed of a recording."

== Release ==
"The House That Jack Built", backed with "Who Cares", was released by Decca on 28 July 1967. The song reached number four on the UK Singles Chart in September 1967, ultimately spending ten weeks on the chart. The Alan Price Set appeared on the 24 August edition of Top of the Pops to promote "The House That Jack Built". The song received enhanced publicity when, in the same edition, its backing track was played in error during the Jimi Hendrix Experience's appearance. (Note: Hendrix reportedly quipped "I don't know the words to that one, man" before the correct backing track was played.) The error exposed the programme's use of backing tracks, considered a "carefully guard secret", and displeased Hendrix who found miming "Burning of the Midnight Lamp" "difficult enough as it is".

== Reception ==
Among contemporary reviews, Penny Valentine of Disc and Music Echo considered it not one of Price's best singles, but felt "it grows on you with listening" and referred to Price as "doing a Marlon Brando by writing, producing and arranging the record himself". (Note: Brando was both director and lead actor of One-Eyed Jacks (1961).) Chris Welch of Melody Maker described the song as "a cleverly original and compulsively listenable story about a house filled with nutty people". Michael Beale for Birmingham Evening Mail and Despatch praised "the amusing, catchy lyrics and foot-tapping instrumental accompaniment".
