= A Price on His Head =

1967 album by the Alan Price set

Studio album by the Alan Price Set
- Released: 8 December 1967
- Recorded: 1967
- Studios: De Lane Lea and Pye, London
- Genres: Music hall; pop; vaudevillian pop
- Length: 30:55
- Label: Decca
- Producer: Alan Price

The Alan Price Set chronology
The Price to Play (1966)	A Price on His Head (1967)	This Price is Right (1968)

Singles from A Price on His Head
- 1. "The House That Jack Built" Released: 28 July 1967

A Price on His Head is the second and final studio album by British band the Alan Price set, released by Decca Records in the UK on 8 December 1967. Following the release and success of the Alan Price Set's version of Randy Newman's song "Simon Smith and the Amazing Dancing Bear", Alan Price became a fan of Newman's compositions. His music delved towards pop in contrast to the rhythm and blues material he had previously performed. A Price on His Head was primarily recorded at Pye Studios over a year, with select tracks taped at De Lane Lea Studios. Price produced the album and arranged the songs with Ivor Raymonde and Mike Leander.

Musically, A Price on His Head differs from the rhythm and blues and soul found on his debut album The Price to Play (1966), instead being a venture into vaudeville and music hall-styled pop inspired by Newman. Out of the album's 13 songs, Newman wrote seven of them, including "So Long Dad", "Tickle Me", "Living Without You", and "Biggest Night of Her Life". A Price on His Head also marked the album songwriting debut of Alan Price, who composed four songs including "The House That Jack Built", which had preceded the album's release as a single in July 1967 and reached number four on the Record Retailer singles chart in the UK. The remaining two songs were composed by Gerry Goffin–Carole King, and Bob Dylan respectively. Several songs on the album features string arrangements, and two of the songs feature only Price accompanied by piano.

Released by Decca Records on 8 December 1967 in anticipation for Christmas, A Price on His Head failed to chart anywhere in the world, something musicologists attributed to the uncommercial lyrics of the Newman compositions found on the album. The material has been reissued multiple times on compilation albums and has also been issued twice on CD. A Price on His Head received critical acclaim by British music critics upon release, with the melodies and variety in every track receiving praise. Retrospectively, critics have identified the album as a tribute to Newman.

== Background and recording ==
After leaving the Animals in May 1965, organist Alan Price formed the Alan Price Set who scored a British top-ten single on the Record Retailer singles chart with a cover of Screamin' Jay Hawkins' "I Put a Spell On You", containing "Animals-ish organ breaks and bluesy vocals". Starting with the follow-up single, "Hi-Lili, Hi-Lo", his material started delving towards "quirky pop hits" that were different in style and "far removed" from the material the Animals were performing. It was around this time Price discovered material from American songwriter Randy Newman, with music critic Chris Welch stating that Price had "fallen under a spell" with his material; Alan Robinson theorized that Price saw Newman's work as having a "distinctive lyrical stance and worldview". Price's first cover of a Newman song, "Simon Smith and the Amazing Dancing Bear", was released as a single on 24 February 1967, and reached number four in the British charts. In a 1995 interview with Dawn Eden Goldstein from Goldmine, Price revealed that although he had written the hit single "I'm Crying" (1964) for the Animals, it wasn't until he discovered Newman that he "felt confident enough to write personal songs".

According to Price, A Price on His Head took "about a year to get ready", stating that the band did not spend "that amount of time in the studios". About half of the album was recorded at Pye Studios with Barry Ainsworth engineering. "The House That Jack Built" was recorded at De Lane Lea Studios with Dave Siddle and Mick Cooper engineering. Besides producing the album himself, Price also arranged the songs together with Ivor Raymonde and Mike Leander, both of whom were "seasoned veterans" on the British music scene. Regarding the work environment, Ainsworth stated that Price was a "good producer to work with" as he "really knew what sound" he was looking for.

== Musical content ==
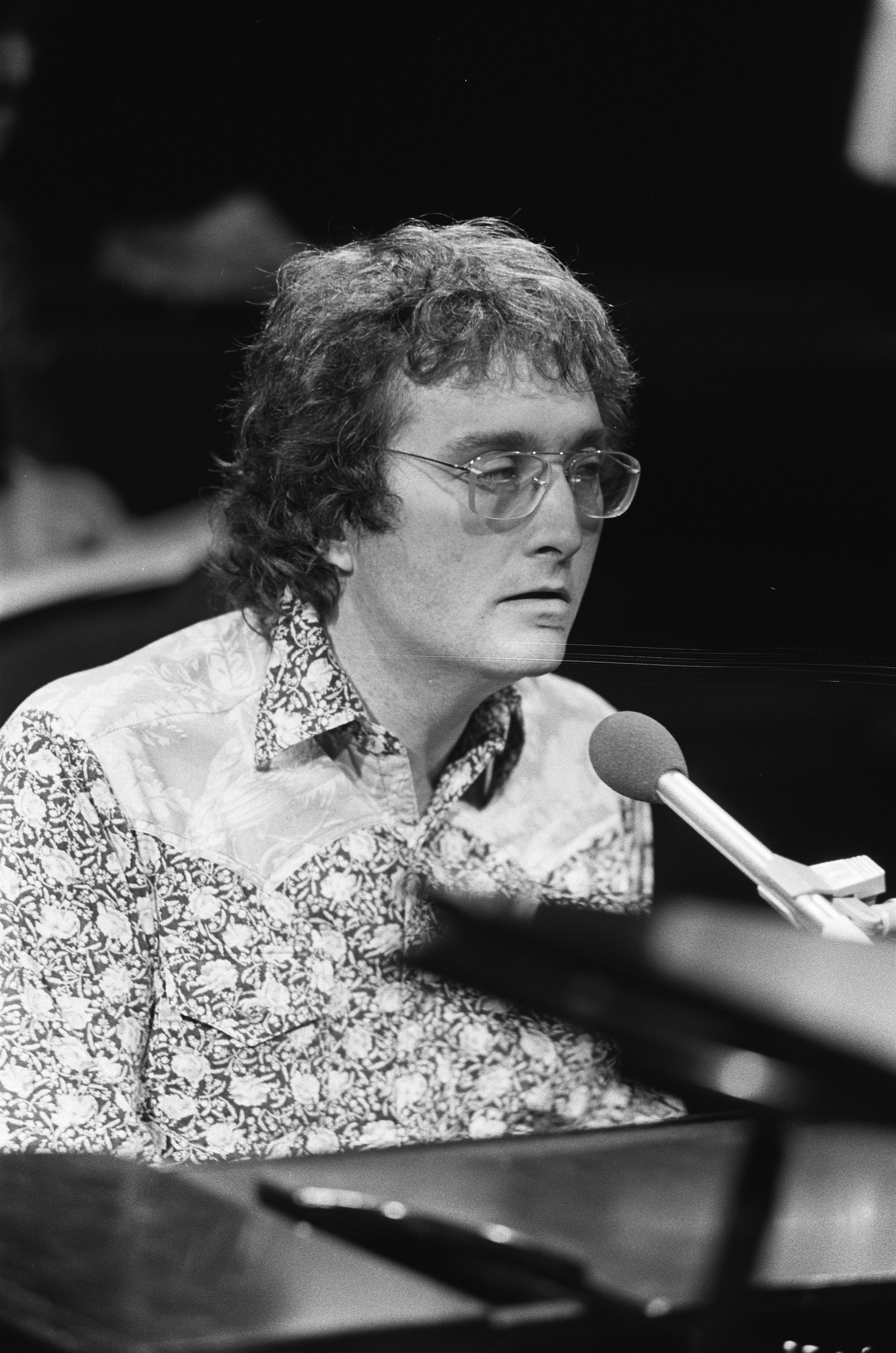
American musician Randy Newman composed seven out of the album's 13 songs.

=== Overview ===
In contrast to the Alan Price Set's debut album The Price to Play (1966) which was a "rather routine set of club R&B / soul", A Price on His Head "consolidated the change of direction" Price had taken since "Simon Smith" had become a major hit in the UK. According to writer Alan Robinson, those who had expected the album to be in a similar vein to Price's debut were confronted by a "record of a very different stripe". For Chris Welch, the album underlined Price's determination to achieve "greater sophistication" and "experiment with pop forms". Richie Unterberger believed that Randy Newman's influence on the album wasn't a "matter of conjecture", as it was in a vaudevillian, husic hall pop style inspired by the songwriter. This stood in contrast with the current musical trends, with Welch noting that Price seemed "immune" to the changes of the summer of love. Newman composed seven of the album's tracks, and Price made his album songwriting debut on A Price on His Head, composing four of the songs. Robinson speculated the reason of the relatively few homegrown songs being that Price had not become a "prolific songwriter in his own right", or that he lacked confidence to make a "full blown album" with original material. "Breaking up" Price's and Newman's songs were the remaining two tracks, "On this Side of Goodbye" written by Gerry Goffin and Carole King, and Bob Dylan's "To Ramona".

=== Songs ===
==== Side one ====
Side one of the album open's with Price's composition "The House That Jack Built", which Welch described as having a "touch of Manfred Mann" in its commerciality. The lyrics features an "amusing collage of characters" which Robinson similarly felt was redolent to Mike d'Abo's compositions for Manfred Mann. "She's Got Another Pair of Shoes" is "funky" and more akin to the Alan Price Set's earlier songs, with Robinson comparing it to the likes of Georgie Fame and Cliff Bennett. The song's "urgent swagger" belied the "downbeat lyrical theme" that was funky without being a "noticeably distinguished song". The album's first song written by Randy Newman is "Come and Dance with Me", which features a string quartet backing the band. Robinson notes the arrangement as featuring echoes of Van Dyke Parks. Welch compares the song to a Broadway musical that stretched "Alan's vocal capabilities", whilst Robinson states that his performance featured a "barely contained desperation".

A ballad, Goffin and King's "On this Side of Goodbye" was described by Robinson as a "fine opus of lovelorn regret" and an "interesting lyrical turnaround". Both Welch and Robinson note Price's vocal performance on the song. Newman's "So Long Dad" opens with studio chatter and coughing before Price "kicks it off with its lubigrious conversational lyrics". According to Robinson, the lyrical content "flew in the faces" of the "parent-hating times" of 1960s pop, albeit is unsure whether the lyrics are to be taken as satire or not. "No One Ever Hurt so Bad" explores the "loser in love" trope, with Welch noting the song to have brassy saxophone riffs. Price penned side one's closer, "Don't Do That Again". Welch writes that it features a "surprisingly spontaneously and relaxed", cheerful performance from the band. Robinson notes the track as a "groovy-enough exercise for Price and the backing crew". "Don't Do That Again" predates the album and had originally appeared as the B-side of Price's non-album single "Shame" on 4 November 1967.

==== Side two ====
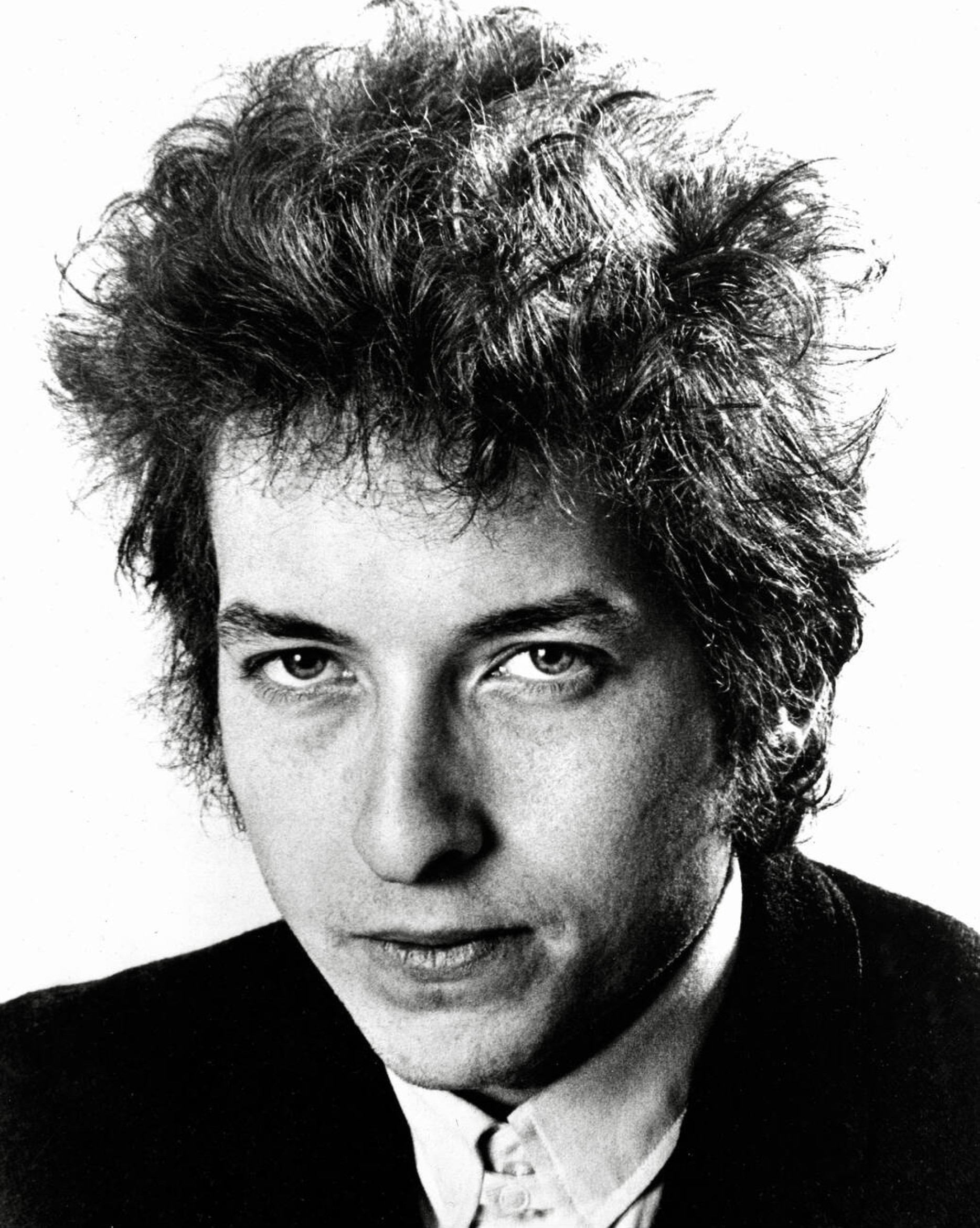
Side two of A Price on His Head features a cover of Bob Dylan's "To Ramona".

Side two of A Price on His Head opens with the engineer's voice and a false start into Newman's "Tickle Me". Set in waltz time, both the string quartet and rhythm section are brought in "live" behind Price's vocal performance, which occasionally "gives way to barely repressed giggles". Robinson opines the song contains "suburban angst" in its lyrical observations about marital ennui akin to the writing of Ray Davies. Price's final songwriting contribution to the album, "Grim Fairy Tale", is a shaggy dog story about a football pools winner who is unable to win the affection of his "one true love". Welch states that the track "retains the Randy Newman spirit". Robinson analogizes the song to the music of the Kinks, with lyrical content that contains "determinedly English whimsicality". In contrast to the rest of the album, Newman's "Living Without You" is barebones in its arrangement, featuring only Price on vocals and piano. For Robinson, the "skeletal arrangement" throws into relief "the bittersweet" lyrics.

"Happy Land" has a lyrical content that ruefully looks on an "idyllic, Edenic childhood reverie" in contrast to the "adult milieu of cares and woe". Musically, it is accompanied by "surging brass and a snatch of brass". The second song on the album not written by Newman or Price, Bob Dylan's "To Ramona" is interpreted in a "heartfelt manner". The song is similarly barebones in its arrangement, featuring only Price's vocal performance accompanied by piano. According to Welch, the song features some of Dylan's less "oblique" lyrics. Robinson speculates that Dylan's influence on Price that tracks back to the latter's appearance in D. A. Pennebaker's 1965 Dylan documentary Dont Look Back is acknowledged on the track with its "tender reading". Closing the album is Newman's "Biggest Night of Her Life", which "concluded Alan's flirtation with Newman". For Robinson, the song is "full of lyrical invention" that was "tellingly" interpreted by Price.

== Release ==
Decca Records released A Price on His Head in the UK on 8 December 1967, in time for the Christmas record market. The album's sleeve notes were written by Melody Maker's Chris Welch. "The House That Jack Built" had preceded the album's release; it was issued as a single 28 July 1967 and reached number four in the UK. A Price on His Head was a commercial failure, failing to "make any chart headway on its release". Similarly, his non-album single "Shame", released a month prior to the album, only reached number 45 on the singles chart. According to Alan Robinson, this was unsurprising, opining that Price's renditions of Newmans' "acerbic" songwriting was not "anywhere near the spirit of the Aquarian age", and that Price's and Newman's stances as a "bemused observer of human nature and inadequacy" was always going to be the nightmare of the record label marketing.

A Price on His Head was not issued in the US during the 1960s, instead, a compilation album consisting of Price's hit singles and various tracks from the album was put together and released by Parrot Records as This Price is Right in February 1968. Material from the album has appeared on several of Price's compilation albums, including Anthology (2002), The House That Jack Built (The Complete 60s Sessions) (2005), and was included in full on the 2017 box set Twice The Price: The Decca Recordings. A Price on His Head itself has been reissued on CD twice; the first re-issue from 1995 on Repertoire Records featured 11 extra bonus tracks, including the Alan Price Set's 1968 single "Don't Stop the Carnival" which reached number 13 on the Record Retailer chart. The second re-issue was released in 2001 on Edsel Records without any bonus tracks.

== Critical reception and legacy ==
Professional ratings
Review scores
Source	Rating
AllMusic	3.5/5 stars
Encyclopedia of Popular Music	3/5 stars
New Musical Express	4/4 stars

A Price on His Head was "unanimously hailed by the critics" upon release. Penny Valentine of Disc and Music Echo labelled the album as the magazine's "top LP of the month", opining that it reflected Alan Price at "his very best" and that it revealed his influence of his idol, Randy Newman". She believed the album was "infinitely melodic, most commercial and every one with a definite story line", believing there to be no "dud among" the songs. She singles out "Come and Dance with Me" as "beautiful" and "Don't Do That Again" as single A-side material. Writing for the New Musical Express, Allen Evans wrote that the album was "a remarkable LP" that featured "tracks that might fool you into guessing someone else rather than Alan" was performing them, including "Living Without You", "Come and Dance with Me" and "Tickle Me". Allens felt that the material composed by Price was more in the vein of the band's earlier material. He awarded the album four stars, the highest rating.

The staff reviewer for Melody Maker wrote that A Price on His Head "couldn't be anything but a very nice album indeed", given Price's "growing talent". They note the false start of "Tickle Me" and the sparse arrangement of "To Ramona" as being "added to give variety" to the occasional track. They nonetheless state the album to be "excellent". Conrad Wilson of The Scotsman identified the album as "genial pop" that "rarely failed to please". Though he believed that Newman's compositions on the album were "neat and melodic" yet "not as catchy" as Price's own compositions, including "The House That Jack Built". He further singles out "Living Without You" as a standout track. For to the staff reviewer of the Manchester Evening News, A Price on His Head represented the best album since the Beatles' Sgt. Pepper's Lonely Hearts Club Band (1967). On the contrary, the reviewer for The Observer felt that the album was a "disappointment" after his hits of 1967, despite finding it well-arranged and produced.

Writing for AllMusic retrospectively, critic Richie Unterberger wrote that the album represented a move into a "more original, if less powerful, brand of vaudevillian pop" courtesy of Randy Newman. As such, he felt that the material came off as hearing a "jauntier, more lighthearted [version of] Georgie Fame". He similarly felt that Price's own material on the album bore strong semblances of Newman and awarded the album 3.5 out of 5 stars. He described the version of "On this Side of Goodbye" as "nice". For Unterberger, Price represented Newman's "biggest booster at the time" and that the album "amounted to a Randy Newman appreciation society on disc". Alan Robinson believed the album was a "cool, witty collection", with motifs found in Newman's songwriting being something Price would "explore and embellish" throughout his discography. A Price on His Head was the final album by the Alan Price Set; Price disbanded the band in 1968 as he "spread his wings".

== Track listing ==
All songs written by Randy Newman, unless otherwise noted. Track lengths adapted from the 2001 CD reissue of A Price on His Head.

Side one

1. "The House That Jack Built" (Alan Price) – 3:14
2. "She's Got Another Pair of Shoes" (Price) – 2:41
3. "Come and Dance with Me" – 2:03
4. "On this Side of Goodbye" (Gerry Goffin, Carole King) – 3:28
5. "So Long Dad" – 2:50
6. "No One Ever Hurt so Bad" – 2:26
7. "Don't Do That Again" (Price) – 2:07

Side two

1. "Tickle Me" – 2:49
2. "Grim Fairy Tale" (Price) – 3:40
3. "Living Without You" – 2:48
4. "Happy Land" – 2:46
5. "To Ramona" (Bob Dylan) – 3:08
6. "Biggest Night of Her Life" – 2:02
