= On this Side of Goodbye =

Song performed by The Animals

"On This Side of Goodbye"

Single by The Righteous Brothers

from the album Sayin' Somethin'
- B-side: "A Man Without a Dream"
- Released: October 1966
- Recorded: August 26, 1966
- Genre: Pop
- Length: 3:10
- Label: Verve
- Composer: Carole King
- Lyricist: Gerry Goffin
- Producer: Bill Medley

"On this Side of Goodbye" is a song written by Gerry Goffin and Carole King. It was first released by The Righteous Brothers in 1966, on a Verve Records 45 rpm single that peaked at #47 on the Billboard Hot 100 singles chart.

In 1967 Eric Burdon and the Animals released a version on the album Eric Is Here using the shorter title "This Side of Goodbye". The Animals' former keyboardist Alan Price also released a version in 1967, on his British Decca album A Price on His Head. The track also appeared in 1968 on Price's next album This Price Is Right, released in the United States by the Parrot label.
