= Randy Newman's Faust =

Studio album by Randy Newman
- Released: September 19, 1995
- Recorded: 1993–1995
- Genre: Musical, rock opera
- Label: Reprise/Warner Bros.
- Producer: Peter Asher, Don Was

Randy Newman chronology
Land of Dreams (1988)	Randy Newman's Faust (1995)	Guilty: 30 Years of Randy Newman (1998)

Randy Newman's Faust is the ninth studio album and a 1995 musical by American musician and songwriter Randy Newman, who based the work on the classic story of Faust, borrowing elements from the version by Goethe, as well as Milton's Paradise Lost, but updating the story to the modern day, and infusing it with humorous cynicism.

In this retelling, God and the Devil fight for the soul of Henry Faust, a student at the University of Notre Dame.

The musical was performed at the La Jolla Playhouse in San Diego in September 1995, and the Goodman Theatre in Chicago in Sept 1996, as well as released as a CD as a concept album.

== Background ==
In a 1995 New York Times piece, Newman said that he was first inspired to create a work based on Goethe's Faust in the 1970s, after a first reading of the play. However, during a 2014 staging of the show at the New York City Center, Newman said onstage that "[Goethe's] Faust, of course, is a masterpiece: I read the classic comic book, and I concur.”

Newman said he had already been a fan of works that concern Heaven (such as the 1930 Marc Connelly play Green Pastures, and the 1945 movie The Horn Blows at Midnight), and that "[i]t's such a big idea, with God and the Devil, that I thought I could put everything I knew into it and say whatever I wanted[.]" Regarding his own designs for the material, however, Newman also said that "...there's something so wise about [Goethe's Faust] that it made me want to try to destroy it, in a way," and "have all its wisdom frustrated by the nature of real human beings[.]"

In 1980, Newman wrote a few songs for the project, as well as a rough draft of a script; he then put it aside to focus on his solo career and film composing.

At one point Newman showed a script of the show to Mike Nichols, who criticized the conception of the show's "Faust" character, "Henry Faust," saying (as Newman put it), "The kid doesn’t have any arc. Nothing happens to him.” Newman later said, in 2017, "But I liked that. It makes for a gruesome evening of theater."

The song "Sandman's Coming" was recycled from an episode of the 1990 television series Cop Rock, for which Newman had written a number of songs.

== Production history ==
Randy Newman's Faust first had a limited run at La Jolla Playhouse in San Diego in September 1995, which coincided with the release of a concept album version, featuring a different cast and arrangements than the stage version. The stage production, directed by Michael Greif was praised for its score, but criticized for its script and characters.

The script was rewritten by David Mamet for the second production, in Chicago's Goodman Theatre. This production, featuring the same principal cast, suffered similar criticisms that its script was still not the equal of its score. It ran from September 30 to November 2, 1996.

On July 1, 2014, New York City Center's Encores! staged a one-night-only performance of the show. This version was stripped down for a more minimal "concert" presentation and heavily rewritten. As on the album (but unlike earlier stage versions), Newman himself assumed the role of Lucifer, alongside a new cast that included Isaiah Johnson, Michael Cerveris, Tony Vincent, Laura Osnes, and Vonda Shepard. In 2024, concerts of the show were held at the Soraya in Los Angeles, California, on September 28 and 29, starring Ryan McCartan in the title role, Reeve Carney as the Devil, Javier Muñoz as the Lord and Veronica Swift as Martha. It was directed by Michael Roth.

== Musical numbers ==
Act I

- "Glory Train" - God, Devil, Company
- "Can't Keep a Good Man Down" - Devil
- "How Great Our Lord" - God, Company
- "Northern Boy" - God, Devil
- "Bless the Children of the World" - Henry Faust
- "The Man" - Henry Faust, Devil
- "Little Island" - Angel Rick
- "Relax, Enjoy Yourself" - God, Devil, Child, Company

Act II

- "Gainesville" - Margaret
- "Life Has Been Good to Me" - Martha
- "I Gotta Be Your Man" - Devil, Company
- "Feels Like Home" - Martha
- "Bleeding All Over the Place" - Devil, Martha
- "My Hero" - Margaret
- "Sandman's Coming" - Margaret
- "Happy Ending" - Devil, Company

== Original casts ==
Character	Studio Album	La Jolla Playhouse	Goodman Theatre
Character	1995		1996
The Devil	Randy Newman	David Garrison	David Garrison
The Lord	James Taylor	Ken Page	Ken Page
Henry Faust	Don Henley	Kurt Deutsch	Kurt Deutsch
Angel Rick	Elton John	Christopher Sieber	-
Margaret	Linda Ronstadt	Bellamy Young	Bellamy Young
Martha	Bonnie Raitt	Sherie Rene Scott	Sherie Rene Scott

== Critical reception ==
Professional ratings
Review scores
Source	Rating
AllMusic	2/5 stars
Chicago Tribune	2.5/4 stars
Robert Christgau	A
Entertainment Weekly	A
Rolling Stone	3/5 stars

In a contemporary review for Playboy, music critic Robert Christgau found the album's vivid songs and musical comedy settings ideal for Newman's "high-spirited cynicism": "Musical comedy is the perfect medium for his unique synthesis of soundtrack grandeur, blues-savvy studio rock, and general Americana." He named it the fifth best album of the year. However, Faust only finished 87th in the voting for the Pazz & Jop, an annual critics poll run by The Village Voice. Al Weisel of Rolling Stone was critical of songs like "Little Island" and "Northern Boy", which he felt deviate from the storyline, although he called the album "the best work in years for all involved".

"Life Has Been Good to Me" was performed by French Stewart as Harry Solomon on 1997's "A Nightmare on Dick Street," an episode of NBC's 3rd Rock from the Sun. "Relax, Enjoy Yourself" and "Can't Keep a Good Man Down" were performed by two different cast groups in "Ally McBeal: The Musical, Almost", the 2000 third-season finale of Ally McBeal.

The music for "Glory Train" was partially re-used by Newman in the 2017 song "The Great Debate", from his solo album Dark Matter.

== Studio album ==
=== Album track listing ===
All tracks are written by Randy Newman.

Disc One
No.	Title	Performer(s)	Length
1.	"Glory Train"	Randy Newman, James Taylor	4:44
2.	"Can't Keep a Good Man Down"	Randy Newman	2:45
3.	"How Great Our Lord"	James Taylor	2:42
4.	"Best Little Girl"	Randy Newman	2:28
5.	"Northern Boy"	James Taylor, Randy Newman	2:55
6.	"Bless The Children of the World"	Don Henley	3:50
7.	"Gainesville"	Linda Ronstadt	3:30
8.	"Relax, Enjoy Yourself"	James Taylor, Randy Newman, Kristyn Liang-chan	5:41
9.	"Life Has Been Good To Me"	Bonnie Raitt	3:28
10.	"Little Island"	Elton John	3:20
11.	"The Man"	Don Henley, Randy Newman	3:14
12.	"My Hero"	Linda Ronstadt	2:35
13.	"I Gotta Be Your Man"	Randy Newman	2:31
14.	"Feels Like Home"	Bonnie Raitt	4:26
15.	"Bleeding All Over the Place"	Randy Newman, Bonnie Raitt	4:15
16.	"Sandman's Coming"	Linda Ronstadt	2:41
17.	"Happy Ending"	Randy Newman	3:21

Disc Two (2005 Expanded Edition reissue only)
No.	Title	Length
1.	"Pass On Over (demo)"	1:13
2.	"How Great Our Lord (demo)"	3:48
3.	"Each Perfect Day (demo)"	1:10
4.	"Best Little Girl (demo)"	2:48
5.	"It Was Beautiful (demo)"	2:16
6.	"Northern Boy (demo)"	3:26
7.	"Bless the Children of the World (demo)"	4:40
8.	"Damn Fine Day (demo)"	2:32
9.	"March of the Protestants (demo)"	1:50
10.	"Little Island (demo)"	3:47
11.	"The Man (demo)"	4:34
12.	"Love Time (demo)"	6:51
13.	"Relax, Enjoy Yourself (demo)"	6:55
14.	"When Love Is in the Air (demo)"	3:21
15.	"Gainesville, Florida (demo)"	3:26
16.	"Life Has Been Good to Me (demo)"	3:28
17.	"My Hero (demo)"	3:04
18.	"Hard Currency (demo)"	3:13
19.	"Sandman's Coming (demo)"	2:41
20.	"Basin Street Blues (demo)"	2:06

=== Personnel ===
- Randy Newman - vocals, piano
- James Taylor - vocals
- Elton John - vocals
- Linda Ronstadt - vocals
- Don Henley - vocals
- Bonnie Raitt - vocals
- Bob Mann - guitar
- Michael Landau - guitar
- Michael Thompson - guitar
- Ry Cooder - guitar
- Mark Goldenberg - guitar
- John Gaux - guitar
- Doug Livingston - pedal steel
- Steve Tavaglione - saxophone
- Bill Payne - Hammond B-3 organ
- Benmont Tench - Hammond B-3 organ
- Randy Waldman - synthesizer
- Robbie Buchanan - synthesizer
- Randy Kerber - synthesizer
- Jimmy Johnson - bass
- James "Hutch" Hutchinson - bass
- Larry Klein - bass
- Leland Sklar - bass
- Carlos Vega - drums
- Danny Carmassi - drums
- Kenny Aronoff - drums
- Jim Keltner - drums
- Michael Fisher - percussion
- Waddy Wachtel - guitar
