= The Randy Newman Songbook Vol. 2 =

Studio album by Randy Newman
- Released: May 10, 2011
- Recorded: 2009–2011
- Studios: Conway, Hollywood, California
- Label: Nonesuch
- Producers: Lenny Waronker, Mitchell Froom

Randy Newman chronology
Harps and Angels (2008)	The Randy Newman Songbook Vol. 2 (2011)	The Randy Newman Songbook Vol. 3 (2016)

Professional ratings
Aggregate scores
Source	Rating
Metacritic	81/100
Review scores
Source	Rating
AllMusic	3.5/5 stars
American Songwriter	4.5/5 stars
The Independent	4/5 stars
The Irish Times	5/5 stars
Mojo	4/5 stars
MusicOMH	4.5/5 stars
Record Collector	4/5 stars
The Telegraph	5/5 stars
Tom Hull	B+
Uncut	4/5 stars

The Randy Newman Songbook Vol. 2 is the thirteenth studio and second songbook album by American musician Randy Newman and contains newly recorded, stripped-down versions of some of his best known songs, performed by him singing and playing the piano without accompaniment.

== Track listing ==
All tracks composed and arranged by Randy Newman

1. "Dixie Flyer"
2. "Yellow Man"
3. "Suzanne"
4. "The Girls in My Life, Pt. 1"
5. "Kingfish"
6. "Losing You"
7. "Sandman's Coming"
8. "My Life Is Good"
9. "Birmingham"
10. "Last Night I Had a Dream"
11. "Same Girl"
12. "Baltimore"
13. "Laugh and Be Happy"
14. "Lucinda"
15. "Dayton, Ohio, 1903"
16. "Cowboy"

== Personnel ==
Randy Newman – vocals, piano
