= A Gigster's Life for Me =

Studio album by Alan Price and the Electric Blues Company
- Released: January 1, 1996
- Recorded: July–August 1995
- Studio: Olympic, London
- Genre: Rock, blues rock
- Length: 1:09:36
- Label: Indigo/Sanctuary
- Producer: Alan Price and the Electric Blues Company

Alan Price and the Electric Blues Company chronology
| Covers (1994) | A Gigster's Life for Me (1996) |

Professional ratings
Review scores
| Source | Rating |
|---|---|
| AllMusic | 4/5 stars |

A Gigster's Life for Me is the second album recorded by Alan Price and the Electric Blues Company, following Covers (1994). It was recorded between July and August 1995 at Olympic Studios, London, and released as part of Sanctuary Records' Blues Masters Series in 1996.

== Track listing ==
1. "Boom Boom Boom Boom" (John Lee Hooker) – 4:47
2. "Rockin' Pneumonia and the Boogie Woogie Flu" (Huey "Piano" Smith, John Vincent) – 3:32
3. "Rollin' Like a Pebble in the Sand" (Rudy Toombs) – 3:10
4. "I Put a Spell on You" (Screamin' Jay Hawkins) – 3:02
5. "Good Times/Bad Woman" (Peter Bardens, Bobby Tench) – 4:03
6. "Some Change" (Boz Scaggs) – 5:32
7. "Enough Is Enough" (Zoot Money) – 3:05
8. "Whatcha Gonna Do?" (Peter Green} – 4:44
9. "A Gigster's Life for Me" (Alan Price, Tench) – 4:37
10. "(I Got) Business With the Blues" (Mitchell, Money) – 4:08
11. "How You've Changed" (Price) – 5:16
12. "Old Love" (Eric Clapton, Robert Cray) – 7:16
13. "What Am I Living For?" (Art Harris, Fred Jay) – 5:19
14. "Say It Isn't True" (Jackson Browne) – 11:05

== Personnel ==
=== Alan Price and The Electric Blues Company ===
- Alan Price – keyboards, vocals
- Bobby Tench – lead guitar, vocals
- Zoot Money – keyboards, vocals
- Pete Grant – bass
- Martin Wilde – drums

=== Technical ===
- Alan Price and the Electric Blues Company – producers
- Adam Brown, Lorraine Francis, Pete Lewis, Steve "Barney" Chase – engineers
- Mark Warner – assistant engineer

== Re-issues ==
- Sanctuary/BMG 09076-81285 (2003)
- Castle 36115 (2005)
