= Between Today and Yesterday =

Studio album by Alan Price
- Released: 1974
- Length: 47:03
- Label: Warner Bros
- Producer: Alan Price

Alan Price chronology
Savaloy Dip (1974)	Between Today and Yesterday (1974)	Metropolitan Man (1975)

Professional ratings
Review scores
Source	Rating
AllMusic	4.5/5 stars
Christgau's Record Guide	B

Between Today and Yesterday is an autobiographical concept album released in 1974 by the English singer-songwriter Alan Price.

In its original LP format, Side One was titled "Yesterday" and Side Two was titled "Today." The "Yesterday" side featured six songs about the working class environment, in Northern England, in which Price was raised. The songs drew heavily from the music hall style. The "Today" side contained six songs about the more modern Price, performed in a more contemporary style.

The title track was written for the unreleased album Savaloy Dip, which was recorded prior to that but released in 2016.

The album was a commercial and critical success.

== Track listing ==
All songs written by Alan Price

LP Side 1

1. "Left Over People" – 2:57
2. "Away, Away" – 2:54
3. "Between Today and Yesterday" – 4:28
4. "In Times Like These" – 2:39
5. "Under the Sun" – 4:37
6. "Jarrow Song" – 5:45

LP Side 2

1. "City Lights" – 4:40
2. "Look at My Face" – 2:49
3. "Angel Eyes" – 3:13
4. "You're Telling Me" – 5:37
5. "Dream of Delight" – 3:33
6. "Between Today and Yesterday" – 4:25

The 2003 compact disc release includes the following bonus tracks:

- "Jarrow Song" (single version) – 4:37
- "In Times Like These" (single version) – 2:35
- "Sell, Sell, Sell" – 3:58
- "Between Today and Yesterday '86" – 3:48
- "Jarrow Song '86" – 3:36

== Personnel ==
=== Musicians ===
- Alan Price – organ, piano, keyboards, vocals
- Colin Green – guitar
- Dave Markee – bass guitar, double bass
- Clive Thacker – drums
- Derek Wadsworth – orchestration

=== Technical ===
- Alan Price – producer
- Bob Fisher – mastering
- Keith Grant – engineer
- David Hamilton-Smith – assistant engineer
- Barbara Brunsdon – cover illustration
- Seabrook Graves Aslett – sleeve art
- Richie Unterberger – liner notes (2003 CD)
