= Savaloy Dip =

Studio album by Alan Price
- Released: 1974 (2016)
- Recorded: 1974
- Genre: Singer-songwriter
- Length: 39:50
- Label: Reprise, Omnivore
- Producer: Alan Price

Alan Price chronology
O Lucky Man! (1973)	Savaloy Dip (1974)	Between Today and Yesterday (1974)

Professional ratings
Review scores
Source	Rating
AllMusic	4/5 stars

Savaloy Dip is an album recorded in 1974 by singer-songwriter Alan Price. Despite being recorded in 1974 and intended to be a sequel to O Lucky Man!, it was only released in 2016.

It was recorded for Reprise Records as a full-length album, clearly intended for official release, but was recalled by the company after being accidentally issued on 8-track.

Before it was recalled, a limited number of copies were sold, which are now very rare.

It was intended to be a sequel to O Lucky Man!, but due to it being recalled, the album was dropped and Price moved on to record Between Today and Yesterday, with its title track originally having been written for Savaloy Dip.

In 2016 it was released by Omnivore Recordings.

== Track listing ==
All songs written by Alan Price, except where indicated.

1. "Smells Like Lemon, Tastes Like Wine" – 4:34
2. "Willie the Queen" – 3:13
3. "You Won't Get Me" – 4:03
4. "Poor Jimmy" – 4:16
5. "Savaloy Dip" – 4:04
6. "Keep On Doin’ It" – 2:37
7. "Country Life" – 2:32
8. "Passin’ Us By" – 2:24
9. "Over and Over Again" (Kenny Craddock) – 4:21
10. "And So Goodbye" – 3:57
11. "Between Today and Yesterday" – 3:49

== Personnel ==
=== Musicians ===
- Alan Price – vocals, piano, organ, bass
- Hughie Flint, Alan White, Craig Collinge – drums
- Pete Kirtley – guitar
- John Mumford – bass, trombone
- Jeff Condon – trumpet
- Steve Gregory, Stan Sulzmann – tenor saxophone

=== Technical ===
- Alan Price – producer
- Ed Thrasher – art direction
- John Haynes – photography
- Gene Sculatti – liner notes
- Dusty Springfield – quotation author
- Brad Rosenberger, Cheryl Pawelski – reissue producer
- Greg Allen – reissue art direction
- Reuben Cohen, Gavin Lurssen – reissue mastering
