= The Price to Play =

Studio album by the Alan Price Set
- Released: 25 November 1966
- Genres: Rock and roll, rhythm and blues
- Length: 38:43
- Label: Decca

The Alan Price Set chronology
The Price to Play (1966)	A Price on His Head (1967)

Professional ratings
Review scores
Source	Rating
AllMusic	3/5 stars

The Price to Play is the debut album by the Alan Price Set, released by Decca Records on 25 November 1966. It was released in the UK only, although some tracks would later come out in the US. Fronting a six-piece band that includes three horns, Price sticks mostly to covers of familiar American rhythm and blues and soul tunes.

== Track listing ==
Side one

1. "Medley: Barefootin' / Let's Go Baby (Where the Action Is) / Land of 1000 Dances" (Robert Parker/Chris Kenner) – 4:36
2. "Just Once in My Life" (Gerry Goffin, Carole King, Phil Spector) – 3:26
3. "Goin' Down Slow" (St. Louis Jimmy) – 4:45
4. "Getting Mighty Crowded" (Van McCoy) – 2:15
5. "Honky Tonk" (Billy Butler, Bill Doggett, Clifford Scott, Shep Shepherd) – 4:40
6. "Move On Drifter" (Jeanette Washington) – 2:29

Side two

1. "Mercy, Mercy" (Don Covay) – 3:09
2. "Loving You Is Sweeter Than Ever" (Ivy Jo Hunter, Stevie Wonder) – 2:46
3. "Ain't That Peculiar" (Pete Moore, William "Smokey" Robinson, Bobby Rogers, Marv Tarplin) – 3:22
4. "I Can't Turn You Loose" (Otis Redding) – 2:24
5. "Critic's Choice" (Oliver Nelson) – 2:02
6. "Hi-Lili, Hi-Lo" (Helen Deutsch, Bronisław Kaper) – 2:49

== Personnel ==
- Alan Price – keyboards, vocals
- Clive Burrows – saxophone
- Steve Gregory – saxophone
- John Walters – trumpet
- Pete Kirtley – guitar
- Rod "Boots" Slade – bass
- "Little" Roy Mills – drums

=== Technical ===
- Chris Walter – photography
- Eric Burdon – liner notes
