= Dark Matter (Randy Newman album) =

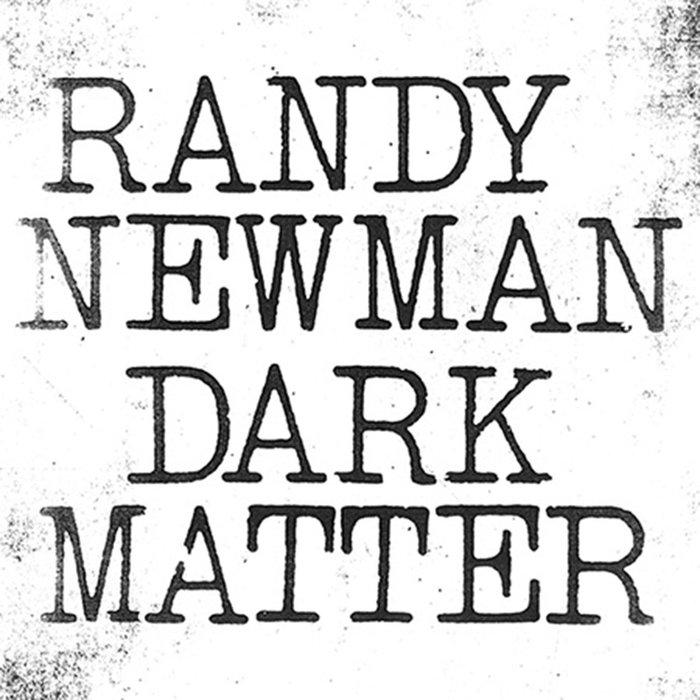

Studio album by Randy Newman
- Released: August 4, 2017
- Studios: University High (Los Angeles, CA); Sony Scoring Stage (Culver City, CA); Sunset Sound (Los Angeles, CA)
- Length: 39:34
- Label: Nonesuch
- Producers: Mitchell Froom; Lenny Waronker; David Boucher

Randy Newman chronology
The Randy Newman Songbook Vol. 3 (2016)	Dark Matter (2017)	The Meyerowitz Stories (2017)

Professional ratings
Aggregate scores
Source	Rating
Metacritic	84/100
Review scores
Source	Rating
AllMusic	4/5 stars
Exclaim!	6/10
Paste	8.7/10
Pitchfork	8.0/10
Vice (Expert Witness)	A

Dark Matter is the fifteenth studio album of original material and first of such in nine years by American musician Randy Newman, released on August 4, 2017, by Nonesuch Records. NPR.org released an advance stream of the album on July 27, 2017. Music critic Robert Christgau ranked it as the sixth-best album of the 2010s.

The album's fifth track, "Sonny Boy," is notable for being a song delivered from the perspective of American bluesman Sonny Boy Williamson (birth name John Lee Curtis Williamson). "Sonny Boy" is about the original Sonny Boy Williamson learning of bluesman Rice Miller having assumed his name and depicts Williamson confronting Miller about it (in fact, the two bluesmen never met). The song imagines the original Sonny Boy Williamson in heaven resenting Miller for having achieved more fame and fortune after having stolen his name.

== Track listing ==
No.	Title	Length
1.	"The Great Debate"	8:08
2.	"Brothers"	4:54
3.	"Putin"	3:44
4.	"Lost Without You"	3:54
5.	"Sonny Boy"	4:42
6.	"It's a Jungle Out There V2 (From Monk)"	3:20
7.	"She Chose Me"	3:12
8.	"On the Beach"	4:30
9.	"Wandering Boy"	3:00

== Accolades ==
Publication	Accolade	Rank	Ref.
Flood Magazine	Top 25 Albums of 2017	23	
Mojo	Top 50 Albums of 2017	33	
Rolling Stone	Top 50 Albums of 2017	13	
Spin	Top 50 Albums of 2017	43	

== Personnel ==
- Randy Newman – piano, vocals
- Matt Chamberlain – drums
- David Piltch – bass
- Blake Mills – guitar
- Mitchell Froom – additional keyboards

Background vocals

"The Great Debate" and "Putin":

- Sandie Hall
- Teresa James
- Kala Balch
- Clydene Jackson (solo on "The Great Debate")
- Alva Copeland
- Donna Medine
- Randy Crenshaw
- John West
- Michael Geiger
- Alvin Chea

"Brothers":

- Randy Crenshaw
- John West
- Alvin Chea

Production

- Mitchell Froom – producer
- Lenny Waronker – producer
- David Boucher – producer, recording, mixing
- Robert C. Ludwig – mastering
- Robert Hurwitz – executive producer

Visual

- Michael Carney – art direction & design
- Pamela Springsteen – photograph

== Charts ==
=== Weekly charts ===
Chart (2017)	Peak position
Austrian Albums (Ö3 Austria)	35
Belgian Albums (Ultratop Flanders)	13
Belgian Albums (Ultratop Wallonia)	129
Dutch Albums (Album Top 100)	8
German Albums (Offizielle Top 100)	48
Irish Albums (IRMA)	25
New Zealand Heatseekers Albums (RMNZ)	3
Scottish Albums (Official Charts)	20
Swiss Albums (Schweizer Hitparade)	20
UK Albums (Official Charts)	61
US Americana/Folk Albums (Billboard)	3
US Top Rock Albums (Billboard)	21

=== Year-end charts ===
Chart (2017)	Position
Belgian Albums (Ultratop Flanders)	190
