= Randy Newman =

American musician (born 1943)

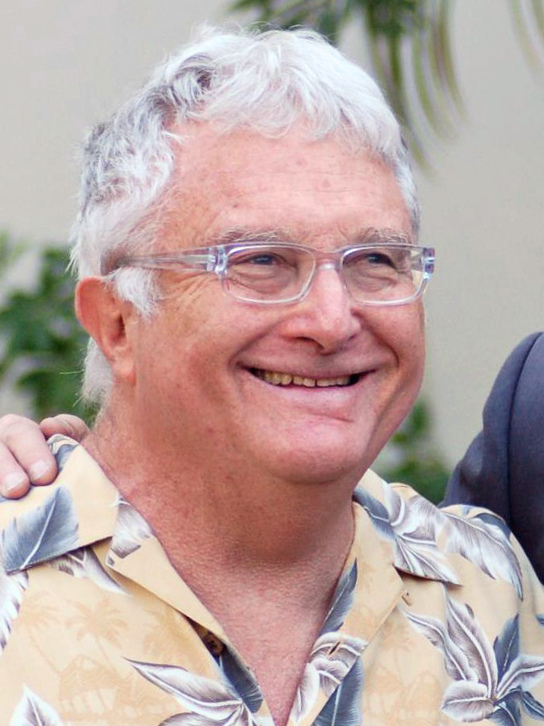
- Newman in 2012
- Born: Randall Stuart Newman; November 28, 1943 (age 82); Los Angeles, California, U.S.
- Occupations: Singer; songwriter; arranger; pianist; composer
- Years active: 1961–present
- Spouses: Roswitha Schmale (m. 1967; div. 1985); Gretchen Preece (m. 1990)
- Children: 5, including Eric
- Relatives: David Newman (cousin); Thomas Newman (cousin); Maria Newman (cousin); Joey Newman (cousin); Lionel Newman (uncle); Emil Newman (uncle); Alfred Newman (uncle)
- Musical career
- Genres: Americana; rock; pop; R&B; soul; comedy; film score
- Instruments: Vocals; piano
- Labels: Warner Bros.; Reprise; Walt Disney; DreamWorks; Interscope; Nonesuch; Elektra; Columbia
- Website: randynewman.com

Randall Stuart Newman (born November 28, 1943) is an American singer-songwriter, pianist, composer, and arranger. Born in Los Angeles to an extended family of Hollywood film composers, he is known for his Americana-inspired songs, non-rhotic Southern-accented singing, and lyrics that are often mordant or satirical and delivered by an unreliable narrator. Since the 1990s, he has worked mainly in film scoring, most popularly for Disney and Pixar.

Newman began his professional career in the early 1960s composing incidental music for television and later penning UK hits for acts such as Cilla Black, Gene Pitney, and the Alan Price Set. After he formed part of a creative circle at Warner Bros. Records in 1966, the company released his first solo album, Randy Newman (1968). Other artists subsequently enjoyed chart success with recordings of his songs "Mama Told Me Not to Come" (1967), "I Think It's Going to Rain Today" (1968), and "You Can Leave Your Hat On" (1972). His own hits as a recording artist include "Short People" (1977), "I Love L.A." (1983), and "You've Got a Friend in Me" (1995). Three of his eleven studio albums have charted in the U.S. top 40: Good Old Boys (1974), Little Criminals (1977), and Harps and Angels (2008).

Newman has received numerous accolades, including two Academy Awards (out of 22 nominations), three Emmys, seven Grammy Awards as well as nominations for a BAFTA Award and seven Golden Globe Awards. His award-winning film work includes Ragtime (1981), The Natural (1984), Toy Story (1995), A Bug's Life (1998), Pleasantville (1998), Monsters, Inc. (2001), Cars (2006), The Princess and the Frog (2009), Toy Story 3 (2010), and Marriage Story (2019). He was honored with the Recording Academy's Governors Award in 2003, a Disney Legend award in 2007, and inductions into the Songwriters Hall of Fame in 2002 and the Rock and Roll Hall of Fame in 2013.

== Early life and education ==
Newman was born to a Jewish family on November 28, 1943, his father's 30th birthday, in Los Angeles, California. He is the son of Adele "Dixie" (née Fuchs/Fox; August 30, 1916 – October 4, 1988), a secretary, and Irving George Newman (November 28, 1913 – February 1, 1990), an internist. He lived in New Orleans, Louisiana, as a young child and spent summers there until he was 11 years old, when his family returned to Los Angeles. The paternal side of his family includes grandparents Luba (née Koskoff) (July 21, 1883 – March 3, 1954) and Michael Newman (Nemorofsky) (1874–1948), and three uncles who were Hollywood film-score composers: Alfred Newman, Lionel Newman, and Emil Newman. Newman's cousins, Thomas, Maria, David, and Joey, are also composers for motion pictures. He graduated from University High School in Los Angeles. He studied music at the University of California, Los Angeles, but dropped out one semester shy of a B.A. In June 2021, he finally completed his degree at UCLA.

Newman's parents were non-observant Jews: Newman himself is an atheist. He has said that religion or any sense of religious identity was completely absent in his childhood. To illustrate this, he has often recounted in interviews an antisemitic incident that occurred when he was young: he was invited by a classmate to be her date to a cotillion at her Los Angeles country club, the Riviera Country Club. He accepted the invitation but was subsequently disinvited by the girl's father, who told Newman that his daughter should never have invited him because Jews were not allowed at the club. Newman hung up the phone, then went to ask his own father what a "Jew" was.

== Career ==
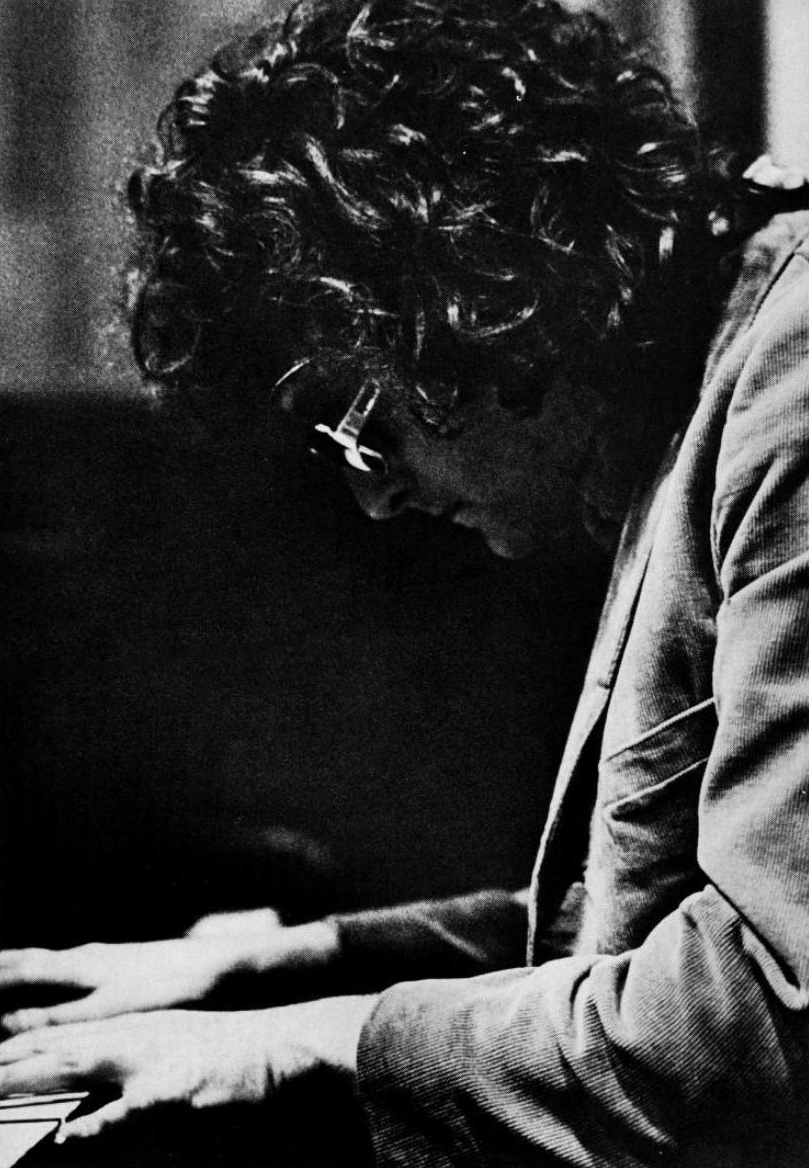
Newman playing piano in 1972

=== Songwriter ===
Newman has been a professional songwriter since he was 17. He cites Ray Charles as his greatest influence growing up, stating, "I loved Charles' music to excess." His first single as a performer was 1962's "Golden Gridiron Boy", released when he was 18. The single flopped and Newman chose to concentrate on songwriting and arranging for the next several years.

An early writing credit was "They Tell Me It's Summer", used as the b-side of the Fleetwoods' 1962 single, "Lovers by Night, Strangers by Day", which led to further commissions from the Fleetwoods and also Pat Boone. Other early songs were recorded by Gene Pitney, Jerry Butler, Petula Clark, Dusty Springfield, Jackie DeShannon, the O'Jays, and Irma Thomas, among others. His work as a songwriter met with particular success in the UK: top 40 UK hits written by Newman included Cilla Black's "I've Been Wrong Before" (No. 17, 1965), Gene Pitney's "Nobody Needs Your Love" (No. 2, 1966) and "Just One Smile" (No. 8, 1966); and the Alan Price Set's "Simon Smith and the Amazing Dancing Bear" (No. 4, 1967). Price, an English keyboardist who was enjoying great success at the time, championed Newman by featuring seven Randy Newman songs on his 1967 A Price on His Head album.

In the mid-1960s, Newman kept a close musical relationship with the band Harpers Bizarre, best known for their 1967 hit version of the Paul Simon composition "The 59th Street Bridge Song (Feelin' Groovy)". The band recorded six Newman compositions, including "Simon Smith" and "Happyland", during their short initial career (1967–1969).

In this period, Newman began a long professional association with childhood friend Lenny Waronker. Waronker had been hired to produce the Tikis, the Beau Brummels and the Mojo Men, who were all contracted to the Los Angeles independent label Autumn Records. He in turn brought in Newman, Leon Russell and another friend, pianist/arranger Van Dyke Parks, to play on recording sessions. Later in 1966, Waronker was hired as an A&R manager by Warner Bros. Records and his friendship with Newman, Russell and Parks began a creative circle around Waronker at Warner Bros. that became one of the keys to Warner Bros.' subsequent success as a rock music label.

In the 1970s, Newman co-wrote with Jake Holmes the "Most Original Soft Drink Ever" jingle for Dr Pepper.

In 2011, Newman endorsed jazz singer Roseanna Vitro's album, The Randy Newman Project (Motéma Music, 2011).

In 2020, Newman wrote a song called "Stay Away" to support people during the COVID-19 pandemic. The song can be downloaded and proceeds go to the Ellis Marsalis Center to support underserved children in New Orleans' 9th Ward.

Newman's song compositions are represented by Downtown Music Publishing.

=== Recording artist ===
His 1968 debut album, Randy Newman, was a critical success but never entered the Billboard Top 200. Many artists, including Barbra Streisand, Helen Reddy, Bette Midler, Alan Price, Van Dyke Parks, Dave Van Ronk, Judy Collins, Glen Campbell, Cass Elliot, Art Garfunkel, the Everly Brothers, Claudine Longet, Bonnie Raitt, Dusty Springfield, Tom Odell, Nina Simone, Lynn Anderson, Wilson Pickett, Pat Boone, Neil Diamond and Peggy Lee, covered his songs and "I Think It's Going to Rain Today" became an early standard.

In 1969, he did the orchestral arrangements for the songs "Minstrel of the Dawn" and "Approaching Lavender" on Gordon Lightfoot's Sit Down Young Stranger (later renamed If You Could Read My Mind) (1970), and for Peggy Lee's single "Is That All There Is?", as well as her album with the same title (which also contained her cover versions of two of his songs: "Love Story" and "Linda"). Also in 1969 he recorded "Gone Dead Train" for the 1970 movie and soundtrack album to Performance, starring Mick Jagger.

In 1970, Harry Nilsson recorded an entire album of Newman compositions (Newman played piano) called Nilsson Sings Newman. The album was not a commercial success, but critics liked it (it won a "Record of the Year" award from Stereo Review magazine), and it paved the way for Newman's 1970 release, 12 Songs, a more stripped-down sound that showcased Newman's piano. Ry Cooder's slide guitar and contributions from Byrds members Gene Parsons and Clarence White helped to give the album a much rootsier feel. 12 Songs was also critically acclaimed (6th best album of the seventies according to Village Voice critic Robert Christgau), but again found little commercial success, though Three Dog Night made a huge hit of his "Mama Told Me Not to Come". The following year, Randy Newman Live cemented his cult following and became his first LP to appear in the Billboard charts, at No. 191. Newman also made his first foray into music for films at this time, writing and performing the theme song "He Gives Us All His Love" for Norman Lear's 1971 film Cold Turkey.

1972's Sail Away reached No. 163 on Billboard, with the title track making its way into the repertoire of Ray Charles and Linda Ronstadt. "You Can Leave Your Hat On" which was covered by Three Dog Night, then Joe Cocker, and later by Keb Mo, Etta James, Tom Jones (whose version was later used for the final striptease to the 1997 film The Full Monty), and the Québécois singer Garou. The album also featured "Burn On", an ode to an infamous incident in which the heavily polluted Cuyahoga River literally caught fire. In 1989, "Burn On" was used as the opening theme to the film Major League, whose focus was the hapless Cleveland Indians.

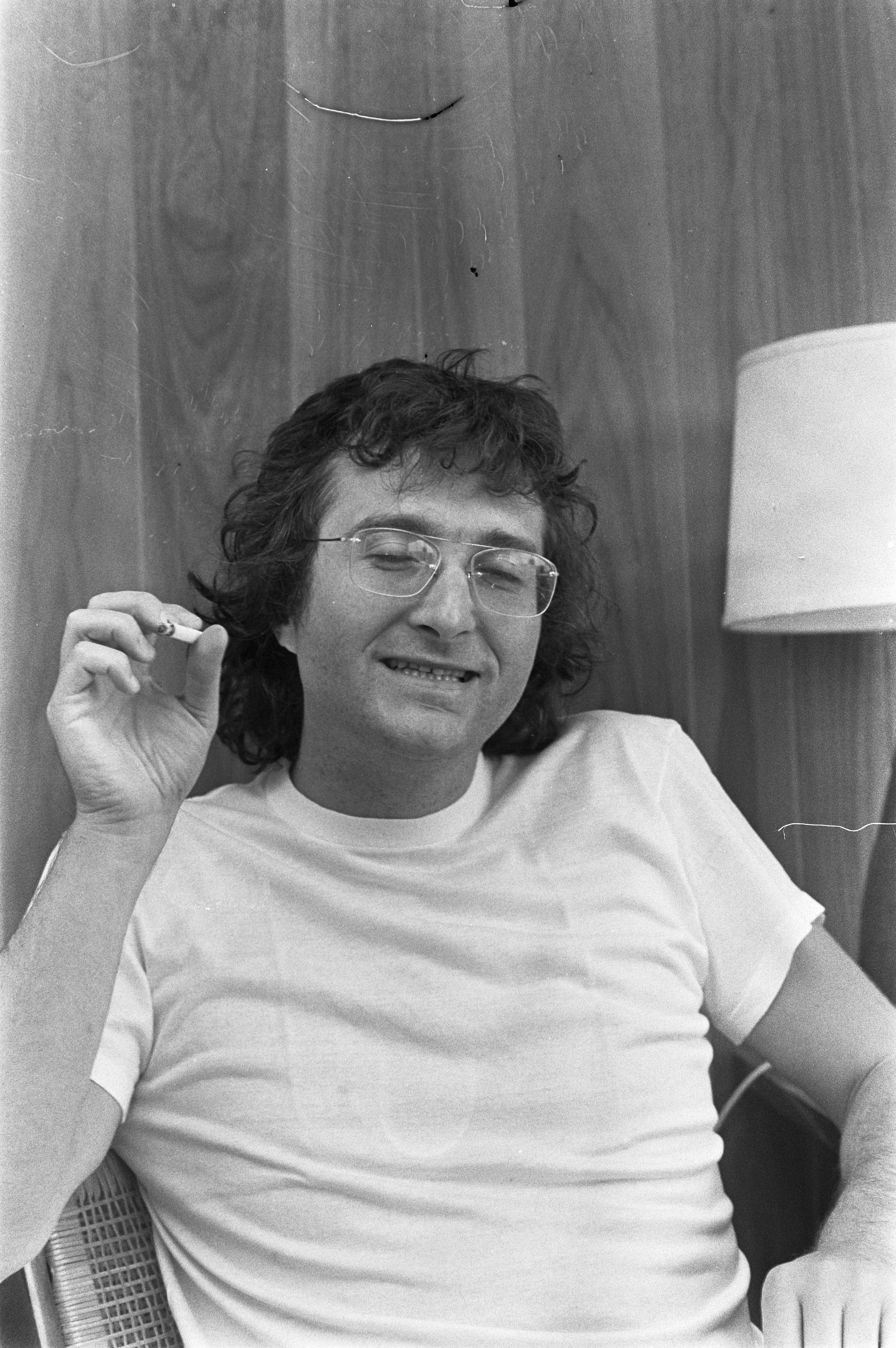
Newman in 1974

His 1974 release Good Old Boys was a set of songs about the American South. "Rednecks" began with a description of segregationist Lester Maddox pitted against a "smart-ass New York Jew" on a TV show (this was a joke, because the "Jew" was Dick Cavett), in a song that criticizes both southern racism and the complacent bigotry of Americans outside of the south who stereotype all southerners as racist yet ignore racism in northern and midwestern states and large cities. This ambiguity was also apparent on "Kingfish" and "Every Man a King", the former a paean to Huey Long (the assassinated former governor and United States senator from Louisiana), the other a campaign song written by Long himself. An album that received lavish critical praise, Good Old Boys also became a commercial breakthrough for Newman, peaking at No. 36 on Billboard 200, spending 21 weeks there.

Little Criminals (1977) contained the surprise hit "Short People", which also became a subject of controversy. In September 1977, the English music magazine NME reported the following interview with Newman talking about his then-new release. "There's one song about a child murderer," Newman deadpans. "That's fairly optimistic. Maybe. There's one called 'Jolly Coppers on Parade' which isn't an absolutely anti-police song. Maybe it's even a fascist song. I didn't notice at the time. There's also one about me as a cowboy called 'Rider in the Rain.' I think it's ridiculous. The Eagles are on there. That's what's good about it. There's also this song 'Short People.' It's purely a joke. I like other ones on the album better but the audiences go for that one." The album proved Newman's most popular to date, reaching No. 9 on the US Billboard 200 chart. Another somewhat controversial Randy Newman number, recorded by both Harpers Bizarre and The Nashville Teens, was "The Biggest Night of Her Life", a song about a schoolgirl who is "too excited to sleep" because she has promised to lose her virginity on her sixteenth birthday to a boy whom her parents like "because his hair is always neat".

1979's Born Again was relatively commercially and critically unsuccessful, with reviews criticizing its cynicism and bad taste and Rolling Stone comparing it unfavorably to Sweeney Todd in a double review.

His 1983 album Trouble in Paradise included the single "I Love L.A.", a song that has been interpreted as both praising and criticizing the city of Los Angeles. This ambivalence is borne out by Newman's own comments on the song. As he explained in a 2001 interview, "There's some kind of ignorance L.A. has that I'm proud of. The open car and the redhead, the Beach Boys ... I can't think of anything a hell of a lot better than that." The ABC network and Frank Gari Productions transformed "I Love L.A." into a popular 1980s TV promotional campaign, retooling the lyrics and title to "You'll Love It!" (on ABC) The song is played at home games for the Los Angeles Dodgers and Los Angeles Lakers as well as the Los Angeles Kings who use the song along with their goal horn. In spite of its prominence, however, it failed to chart on the Billboard Hot 100.

In 1985, Newman performed a set at the first Farm Aid concert that included a duet with Billy Joel on facing grand pianos. Newman performed "Sail Away".

In 2003, Newman's song "It's a Jungle Out There" was used for season 2 of the USA Network's show Monk; it won him the 2004 Emmy Award for Best Main Title Music.

In the years following Trouble in Paradise, Newman focused more on film work, but his personal life entered a difficult period. He separated from his wife of nearly 20 years, Roswitha. He released four albums of new material as a singer-songwriter since that time: Land of Dreams (1988), Bad Love (1999), Harps and Angels (2008), and Dark Matter (2017). Land of Dreams included one of his best-known songs, "It's Money That Matters" (featuring Mark Knopfler on guitar), and featured Newman's first stab at autobiography with "Dixie Flyer" and "Four Eyes", while Bad Love included "I Miss You", a moving tribute to his ex-wife He has also rerecorded a number of songs that span his career, accompanying himself on piano, with The Randy Newman Songbook Vol. 1 (2003), The Randy Newman Songbook Vol. 2 (2011) and The Randy Newman Songbook Vol. 3 (2016). He continues to perform his songs before live audiences as a touring concert artist.

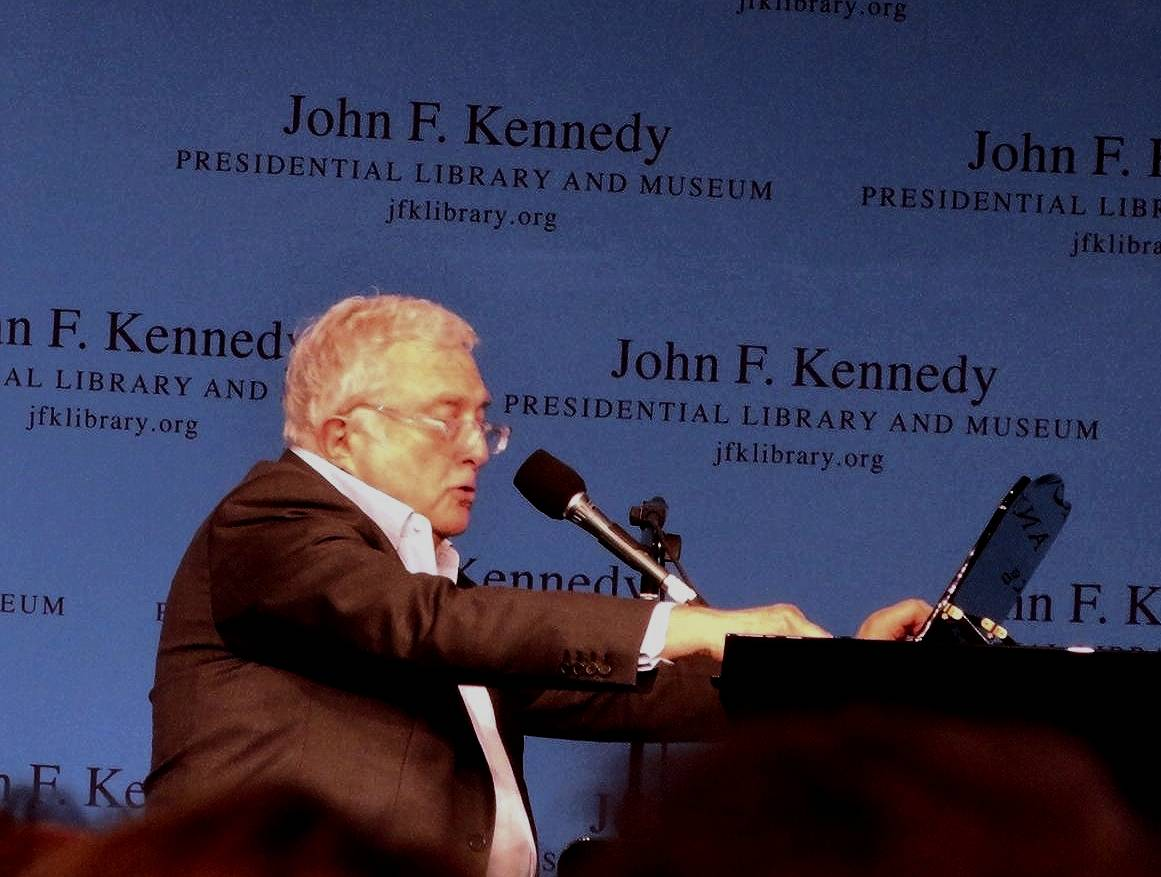
Newman performing at the 2014 Laurence L. & Thomas Winship/PEN New England Award for Songwriting ceremony

In the aftermath of Hurricane Katrina in 2005, Newman's "Louisiana 1927" became an anthem and was played heavily on a wide range of American radio and television stations, in both Newman's 1974 original and Aaron Neville's cover version of the song. The song addresses the deceitful manner in which New Orleans's municipal government managed a flood in 1927, during which, as Newman asserts, "The guys who ran the Mardi Gras, the bosses in New Orleans decided the course of that flood. You know, they cut a hole in the levee and it flooded the cotton fields." In a related performance, Newman contributed to the 2007 release of Goin' Home: A Tribute to Fats Domino (Vanguard), contributing his version of Fats Domino's "Blue Monday". Domino had been rescued from his New Orleans home after Hurricane Katrina, initially having been feared dead.

In October 2016, Newman released the song "Putin". The Washington Post wrote: "inspired by the Russian leader's penchant for bare-chested photo ops and a geopolitical approach that's somewhat short of soft and cuddly, Newman has crafted a song that tells Putin's story from multiple perspectives." Newman explained that the song was from a new album that would be released in 2017, but he was putting out this song early because "I think that people will lose interest after this surfeit of political talk and attention after the election.... I've got the thing done. I just want to see what happens. I'm curious to see how the thing is received." The song earned Newman a Grammy Award for Best Arrangement, Instrumental and Vocals.

Newman released his much anticipated new album, Dark Matter, in August 2017. It received positive reviews, many citing its musical ambition as well as its lyrical bite.

On October 17, 2026, in Oslo (Norway) Bob Dylan sung a cover of "Louisiana 1927".

=== Film composer ===
Newman's earliest scoring work was for television, creating background music for a 1962 episode of TV's The Many Loves of Dobie Gillis, and later working briefly on the 1960s TV shows Lost in Space, Peyton Place and Voyage to the Bottom of the Sea, and more extensively on Judd, for the Defense. In 1966, an album of Newman's Peyton Place music appeared, credited to The Randy Newman Orchestra. The music was not a score from any episode, but incidental library music designed to be heard in contexts where characters turned on a radio station, or were watching TV. Newman claims to have been unaware of the album's existence at the time of release and does not include it in the official "complete discography" on his website. He also co-wrote the title song for the 1970 drama Cover Me Babe. The recording was performed by Bread.

Newman also co-wrote pop songs for films as early as 1964, co-penning "Look at Me" with Bobby Darin for The Lively Set (1964), and "Galaxy-a-Go-Go, or Leave It to Flint" with Jerry Goldsmith for Our Man Flint (1966). However, Newman's work as a composer of actual film scores began with Norman Lear's 1971 satire Cold Turkey. He returned to film work with 1981's Ragtime, for which he was nominated for two Academy Awards. Newman co-wrote the 1986 film Three Amigos with Steve Martin and Lorne Michaels, wrote three songs for the film, and provided the voice for the singing bush.

Newman has scored ten Disney/Pixar feature films; Toy Story, A Bug's Life, Toy Story 2, Monsters, Inc., Cars, Toy Story 3, Monsters University, Cars 3, Toy Story 4, and Toy Story 5. He has earned at least one Academy Award nomination for seven of the nine films he has scored for Pixar, winning the award for Monsters, Inc. and Toy Story 3, both times in the category of Best Original Song. Additional scores by Newman include Avalon, Parenthood, James and the Giant Peach, Seabiscuit, Awakenings, The Paper, Meet the Parents, and its sequel, Meet the Fockers. His score for Pleasantville was an Academy Award nominee. He also wrote the songs for Turner's Cats Don't Dance.

In 1997, he was hired by director Wolfgang Petersen to do the soundtrack of the film Air Force One, however he was rejected because Petersen thought that the score sounded like a parody. So Newman was replaced by Jerry Goldsmith and Joel McNeely who wrote the final score in 12 days. After the film's premiere, several bootlegs of Newman's rejected score were distributed. Composer Hans Zimmer once indicated that he considered these cues superior to any he had written at the time.

Newman had the dubious distinction of receiving the most Oscar nominations (15) without a single win. His losing streak was broken when he received the Academy Award for Best Original Song in 2002, for the Monsters, Inc. song "If I Didn't Have You", beating Sting, Enya and Paul McCartney. After receiving a standing ovation, a bemused but emotional Newman began his acceptance speech with "I don't want your pity!" When the orchestra began playing the underscore signifying that the speaker's time on stage is concluding, Newman ordered them to stop before thanking "all these musicians, many of whom have worked for me several times and may not again".

Besides writing songs for films, he also writes songs for television series such as the Emmy Award-winning theme song of Monk, "It's a Jungle Out There". Newman also composed the Emmy Award-winning song "When I'm Gone" for the final episode.

Newman wrote the music for Walt Disney Animation Studios' The Princess and the Frog. During Disney's annual shareholder meeting in March 2007, Newman performed a new song written for the movie. He was accompanied by the Dirty Dozen Brass Band. The New Orleans setting of the film played to Newman's musical strengths, and his songs contained elements of Cajun music, zydeco, blues and Dixieland jazz. Two of the songs, "Almost There" and "Down in New Orleans", were nominated for Oscars.

In total, Newman has received 22 Academy Award nominations with two wins, both for Best Original Song. While accepting the award for "We Belong Together" in 2011, he joked "my percentages aren't great".

=== Musical theater ===
A revue of Newman's songs, titled Maybe I'm Doing It Wrong, was performed at the Astor Place Theatre in New York City in 1982, and later at other theaters around the country. The New York cast featured Mark Linn-Baker and Deborah Rush, and at one point included Treat Williams.

In the 1990s, Newman adapted Goethe's Faust into a concept album and musical, Randy Newman's Faust. After a 1995 staging at the La Jolla Playhouse, he retained David Mamet to help rework the book before its relaunch on the Chicago Goodman Theatre mainstage in 1996. Newman's Faust had a one-time Off-Broadway performance at the City Center in New York City on July 1, 2014, where Newman starred as the Devil.

In 2000, South Coast Repertory (SCR) produced The Education of Randy Newman, a musical theater piece that recreates the life of a songwriter who bears some resemblance to the actual Newman. Set in New Orleans and Los Angeles, it was modeled on the American autobiography, The Education of Henry Adams.

In 2010, the Center Theatre Group staged Harps and Angels, a musical revue of the Randy Newman songbook, interspersed with narratives reflecting on Newman's inspirations. The revue premiered at the Mark Taper Forum in Los Angeles and included among other songs "I Think It's Going to Rain Today", "Sail Away", "Marie", "Louisiana 1927", "Feels Like Home", "You've Got a Friend in Me" and "I Love L.A". The revue was directed by Jerry Zaks and featured Ryder Bach, Storm Large, Adriane Lenox, Michael McKean, Katey Sagal and Matthew Saldivar.

== Personal life ==
Newman was married to German-born Roswitha Schmale from 1967 to 1985 and they had three sons: Eric, Amos and John. He has been married to Gretchen Preece since 1990, with whom he has two children, Patrick and Alice. Gretchen's father was director Michael Preece.

Newman endorsed Democratic President Barack Obama for reelection in 2012 and wrote "I'm Dreaming", a satirical song about voting for white candidates.

== Awards and nominations ==
Newman has been nominated for 22 Academy Awards, winning twice, both times for Best Original Song—in 2002, for "If I Didn't Have You" from Monsters, Inc., and again in 2011 for "We Belong Together" from Toy Story 3. His nominations have contributed to the Newmans being the most nominated Academy Award extended family, with a collective 92 nominations in various music categories.

Newman has received three Emmys, seven Grammy Awards, and the Governor's Award from the Recording Academy. He was inducted into the Songwriters Hall of Fame in 2002. In 2007, he was inducted as a Disney Legend. In 2010, he received a star on the Hollywood Walk of Fame. Newman was inducted to the Rock and Roll Hall of Fame in 2013. In September 2014, Newman received a Max Steiner Film Music Achievement Award and performed at the annual film music gala Hollywood in Vienna for the first time together with his cousin David Newman.

== Discography ==
Studio albums

- Randy Newman (1968)
- 12 Songs (1970)
- Sail Away (1972)
- Good Old Boys (1974)
- Little Criminals (1977)
- Born Again (1979)
- Trouble in Paradise (1983)
- Land of Dreams (1988)
- Randy Newman's Faust (1995)
- Bad Love (1999)
- The Randy Newman Songbook Vol. 1 (2003)
- Harps and Angels (2008)
- The Randy Newman Songbook Vol. 2 (2011)
- The Randy Newman Songbook Vol. 3 (2016)
- Dark Matter (2017)

== Filmography ==
Year	Title	Director(s)	Studio(s)	Notes
1971	Cold Turkey	Norman Lear	United Artists; Tandem Productions	Randy Newman's first musical score for a feature film
1981	Ragtime	Miloš Forman	Paramount Pictures; Ragtime Productions Ltd. Sunley Productions	
1984	The Natural	Barry Levinson	TriStar Pictures; Delphi II Productions	First collaboration with Barry Levinson
1986	¡Three Amigos!	John Landis	Orion Pictures; HBO Pictures; L.A. Films	Composed original and new songs; score by Elmer Bernstein
1989	Parenthood	Ron Howard	Universal Pictures; Imagine Entertainment	First collaboration with Ron Howard
1990	Avalon	Barry Levinson	TriStar Pictures; Baltimore Pictures	Second collaboration with Barry Levinson
1990	Awakenings	Steven Zaillian	Columbia Pictures; Lasker/Parkes Productions	
1994	The Paper	Ron Howard	Universal Pictures; Imagine Entertainment	Second collaboration with Ron Howard
1994	Maverick	Richard Donner	Warner Bros. Pictures; Icon Productions; Donner/Shuler-Donner Productions	
1995	Toy Story	John Lasseter	Buena Vista Pictures Distribution; Walt Disney Pictures; Pixar Animation Studios	First score for an animated film First collaboration with John Lasseter
1996	James and the Giant Peach	Henry Selick	Buena Vista Pictures Distribution; Walt Disney Pictures; Allied Filmmakers; Skellington Productions	
1996	Michael	Nora Ephron	New Line Cinema; Turner Pictures; Alphaville Films	
1997	Air Force One	Wolfgang Petersen	Sony Pictures Releasing; Columbia Pictures; Beacon Pictures; Radiant Productions	Co-composed with Joel McNeely and Jerry Goldsmith
1997	Cats Don't Dance	Mark Dindal	Warner Bros. Pictures; Turner Feature Animation; David Kirschner Productions	Composed songs; score by Steve Goldstein
1998	A Bug's Life	John Lasseter	Buena Vista Pictures Distribution; Walt Disney Pictures; Pixar Animation Studios	Second collaboration with John Lasseter
1998	Pleasantville	Gary Ross	New Line Cinema; Larger Than Life Productions	First collaboration with Gary Ross
1999	Toy Story 2	John Lasseter	Buena Vista Pictures Distribution; Walt Disney Pictures; Pixar Animation Studios	Third collaboration with John Lasseter
2000	Meet the Parents	Jay Roach	Universal Pictures; DreamWorks Pictures; TriBeCa Productions; Nancy Tenenbaum Productions	First collaboration with Jay Roach
2001	Monsters, Inc.	Pete Docter	Buena Vista Pictures Distribution; Walt Disney Pictures; Pixar Animation Studios	
2003	Seabiscuit	Gary Ross	Universal Pictures; DreamWorks Pictures; Spyglass Entertainment; The Kennedy/Marshall Company; Larger Than Life Productions	Second collaboration with Gary Ross
2004	Meet the Fockers	Jay Roach	Tribeca Productions; Everyman Pictures	Second collaboration with Jay Roach
2006	Cars	John Lasseter	Buena Vista Pictures Distribution; Walt Disney Pictures; Pixar Animation Studios	Fourth collaboration with John Lasseter
2008	Leatherheads	George Clooney	Universal Pictures; Smokehouse Pictures; Casey Silver Productions; Mirage Enterprises	
2009	The Princess and the Frog	John Musker; Ron Clements	Walt Disney Studios Motion Pictures; Walt Disney Pictures; Walt Disney Animation Studios	Replaced Alan Menken
2010	Toy Story 3	Lee Unkrich	Walt Disney Studios Motion Pictures; Walt Disney Pictures; Pixar Animation Studios	
2013	Monsters University	Dan Scanlon	Walt Disney Studios Motion Pictures; Walt Disney Pictures; Pixar Animation Studios	
2017	Cars 3	Brian Fee	Walt Disney Studios Motion Pictures; Walt Disney Pictures; Pixar Animation Studios	
2017	The Meyerowitz Stories	Noah Baumbach	Netflix; IAC Films; Scott Rudin Productions	First collaboration with Noah Baumbach
2019	Toy Story 4	Josh Cooley	Walt Disney Studios Motion Pictures; Walt Disney Pictures; Pixar Animation Studios	
2019	Marriage Story	Noah Baumbach	Netflix; Heyday Films	Second collaboration with Noah Baumbach
2026	Toy Story 5	Andrew Stanton	Walt Disney Studios Motion Pictures; Walt Disney Pictures; Pixar Animation Studios	
