= Alan Price =

English musician (born 1942)

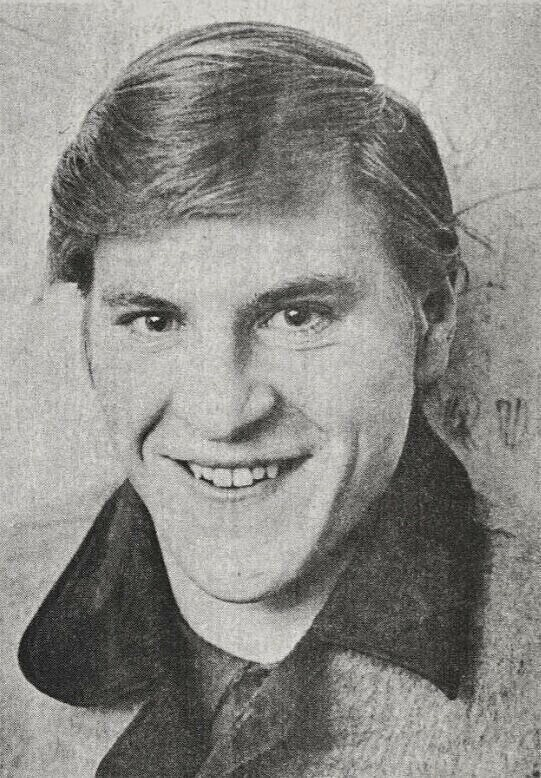
- Price c. 1966

Background information
- Born: 19 April 1942 (age 84); Fatfield, County Durham, England
- Genres: Rock; blues rock; psychedelic rock; pop
- Occupations: Musician; singer; songwriter; musical arranger
- Instruments: Keyboards; guitar; vocals
- Years active: 1961–present
- Labels: Decca; Parrot; Deram; CBS; Vertigo; Cotillion; Sanctuary; United Artists; Jet; Ariola; Polydor; Warner; Indigo; BGO; AP; Mooncrest
- Formerly of: The Animals

Alan Price (born 19 April 1942) is an English musician who first found prominence as the original keyboardist of the English rock band the Animals. He left the band in 1965 to form the Alan Price Set; his hit singles with and without the group include "Simon Smith and the Amazing Dancing Bear", "The House That Jack Built", "Rosetta" (with Georgie Fame) and "Jarrow Song". Price is also known for work in film and television, taking occasional acting roles and composing the soundtrack of Lindsay Anderson's film O Lucky Man! (1973). He was inducted into the Rock and Roll Hall of Fame in 1994 as a member of the Animals.

== Early life and career ==
Price was born in Fatfield, Washington, County Durham, and educated at Jarrow Grammar School, County Durham.

== Music ==
=== The Animals ===
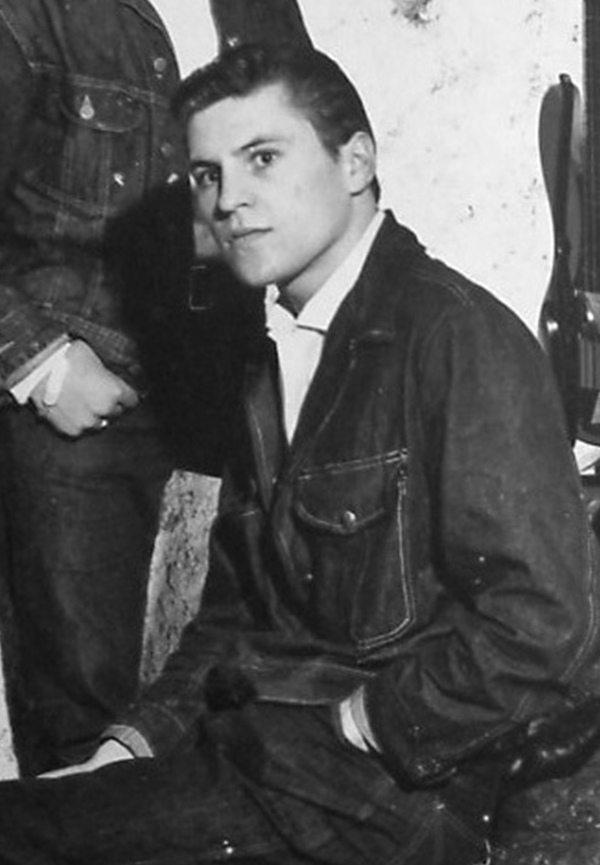
Price with the Animals, 1964

A self-taught musician, Price was a founding member of the Tyneside group the Alan Price Combo, which was later renamed the Animals. Playing organ on the Animals "The House of the Rising Sun", "Don't Let Me Be Misunderstood", and "Bring It On Home to Me", Price was a key element in "the first Animals lineup['s]" success.

As a member of the Animals, Price appeared on numerous television shows including Ready Steady Go!, The Ed Sullivan Show, Hullabaloo, and Top of the Pops. Price left the band in 1965 because of personal and musical differences, as well as his fear of flying while on tour.

In August 1967, he appeared with the Animals at the hippie love-in that was held in the grounds of Woburn Abbey.

Price participated in the Animals' 1977 and 1983 reunions. In July 1983, the band started its last world tour. Price's solo performance of "O Lucky Man" was included in its set. In 1984, the band broke up for the final time, and the album Greatest Hits Live (Rip It to Shreds) was released, composed of recordings from the band's concert at Wembley Arena in London supporting the Police.

Price was inducted as a member of the Animals into the Rock and Roll Hall of Fame in 1994.

==== Controversy over "Rising Sun" credit ====
When interviewed in 2009, John Steel described broad participation by members of the Animals in the arrangement of this traditional work, for instance, with Hilton Valentine developing the characteristic guitar arpeggio, Eric Burdon rewriting the usual female fallen protagonist as a man, and John Steel adopting his drum-pattern from Jimmy Smith's "Walk on the Wild Side". Likewise, all band members in that 2009 interview—Steel, Burdon, and Valentine—expressed uniform harsh judgment regarding Price's departure from the group while holding all songwriting royalty proceeds from their biggest hit. Valentine described the matter, thus:

We were in a rehearsal studio in London when [manager] Mike Jefferey came in and said [Rising Sun] was too long to put "Trad[itional]. Arranged by"... with all our names on the record[,]

indicating that an actual division of the royalties would be later sorted. Burdon then expressed, "Can you believe that we were so naïve? Well... we were", noting that all in the group needed the income, but that he guessed that "Alan... felt he needed it more than anyone else". Valentine then noted that in 1965,

One day... Pricey up and left the band. He didn’t give any notice. [Valentine then notes] that Chas [Chandler] said, 'He must’ve got his first royalty cheque.' We were five guys from Newcastle. We were all buddies and we started to realise we were getting ripped off by everybody and his mother, but to be ripped off within the group, our circle—it was a bit sad.

According to the writer of the Uncut piece, "Price refused to talk" to them about the making of "Rising Sun".

=== The Alan Price Set ===
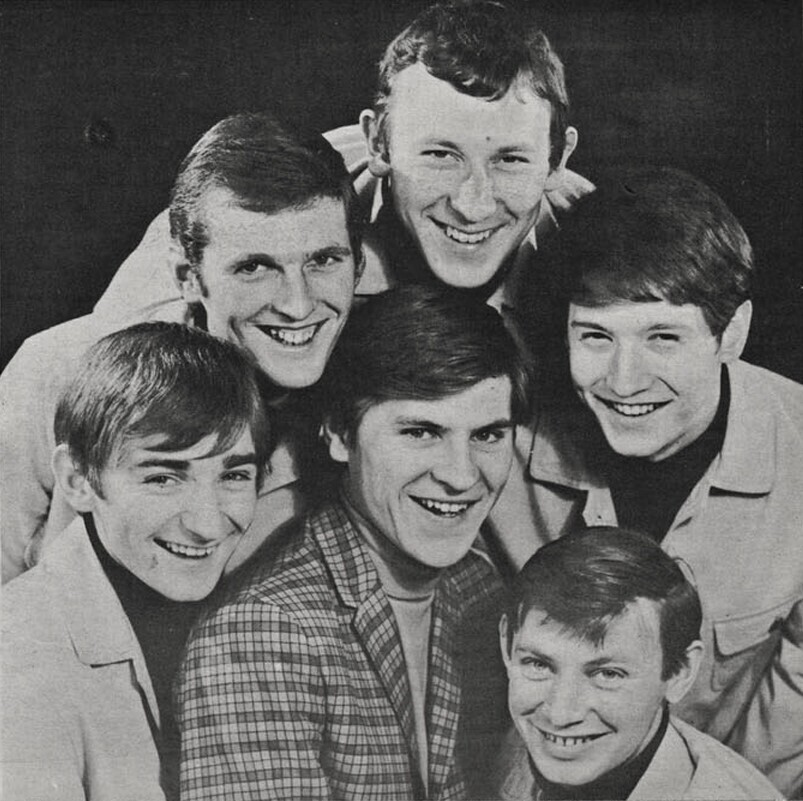
The Alan Price Set in 1966. Clockwise from bottom centre: Alan Price, Roy Mills, Steve Gregory, John Walters, Rod Slade, Clive Burrows.

Price formed the Alan Price Set in 1965, with the line-up of Price, Clive Burrows (baritone saxophone), Steve Gregory (tenor saxophone), John Walters (trumpet), Peter Kirtley (guitar), Rod "Boots" Slade (bass) and "Little" Roy Mills (drums).

=== Solo ===
During 1966, he enjoyed singles success with "I Put a Spell on You", which reached number 9 in the UK singles chart, and "Hi-Lili, Hi-Lo" which reached number 11 in the same chart. In 1967, the Randy Newman song "Simon Smith and His Amazing Dancing Bear" reached number four in the chart, as did his self-penned song, "The House That Jack Built". "Don't Stop the Carnival" followed in 1968, and rose to number 13 in the UK singles charts.

Price went on to host shows such as the musical Price To Play in the late 1960s, which featured him performing and introducing the music of guests such as Fleetwood Mac and Jimi Hendrix. His second album, A Price on His Head (1967), featured seven songs by Randy Newman, who was virtually unknown at that time. Also in 1967, Price was No. 1 in the Keyboard Player category of the 1967 Beat Instrumental Gold Star Awards.

A later association with Georgie Fame resulted in "Rosetta", which became a top-20 hit in 1971, reaching number 11 in the UK Singles Chart. An album followed, Fame and Price, Price and Fame Together. During this period, Price and Fame secured a regular slot on The Two Ronnies show produced by BBC Television, and also appeared on the Morecambe and Wise Show.

He recorded the autobiographical album Between Today and Yesterday (1974) from which the single "Jarrow Song" was taken, returning Price to the UK singles chart at number six. The minor single hits by Price "Just For You" and "Baby of Mine" from 1978 and 1979, respectively, as well as being issued on the usual black vinyl, were also released as red, heart-shaped vinyl discs, which reflected the craze for coloured and oddly shaped vinyl records at the time.

Price recorded two albums with the Electric Blues Company featuring guitarist and vocalist Bobby Tench and keyboardist Zoot Money. The first, Covers, was recorded in 1994. A Gigster's Life for Me followed in 1996 and was recorded as part of Sanctuary's Blues Masters Series at Olympic Studios in south-west London.

Since 1996, Price has continued to perform regularly, arrange, write songs, and create other works. During the 2000s, he has continued to tour the UK with his own band and others, including the Manfreds, Maggie Bell and Bobby Tench.

The album Savaloy Dip was officially released in 2016. Due to an issuing error after the recording of this album in 1974, it was recalled by the record company and not re-released at that time. The title track for his album Between Today and Yesterday was taken from the original Savaloy Dip recording.

== Film, stage and television ==
Price appears in the D. A. Pennebaker documentary Dont Look Back (1967) and is in several scenes with Bob Dylan and his entourage, including one where his departure from the Animals is mentioned.

Price appeared with Georgie Fame in a series of TV shows scripted by Monty Python's Terry Jones on BBC2 titled The Price of Fame or Fame at any Price. They were broadcast on 17 September 1969, 20 November 1969 - 25 December 1969, 17 June 1970.

Price worked several times with director Lindsay Anderson. He wrote the music for Anderson's productions of David Storey's plays Home (1970), The Farm (1973) and The March on Russia (1989), plus his 1975 revival of What the Butler Saw. As well as composing the music for Anderson's film O Lucky Man! (1973), he performs it on screen in the film and appears as himself in one part of the storyline. The score won the 1974 BAFTA Award for Best Film Music. Later, he wrote the score of Anderson's final feature, The Whales of August (1987).

He acted as the lead in Alfie Darling (1975), a sequel to the film Alfie (1966), during the course of which he became romantically involved with his co-star, Jill Townsend. He also composed and sang the song "Time and Tide (I Don't Feel No Pain No More)" for the animated film The Plague Dogs (1982).

On 23 April 1977, Price appeared on an episode of Saturday Night Live, hosted by Eric Idle. He sang the songs "Poor People" (from the O Lucky Man! soundtrack) and "In Times Like These." Also, in 1977, he appeared on another U.S. television show, Don Kirshner's Rock Concert.

In 1979 Price composed and sang the theme song of the ATV series Turtle's Progress. In 1981 he composed the score for the musical Andy Capp based on the eponymous comic strip. He also wrote the lyrics, together with the actor Trevor Peacock. The play transferred from the Royal Exchange Theatre, Manchester, to London's Aldwych Theatre in September 1982. Price later provided the theme to Thames Television's 1988 sitcom adaptation of Andy Capp in the form of a rewritten "Jarrow Song". Other TV theme work includes a re-recorded version of his 1975 single "Papers", which was used as the theme tune to the London Weekend Television situation comedy Hot Metal and the song "Changes", soundtrack to a popular TV commercial for the VW Golf.

In 1992 Anderson included an episode in his autobiographical BBC film Is That All There Is?, with a boat trip down the River Thames to scatter Rachel Roberts and Jill Bennett's ashes on the waters, while Price accompanied himself and sang the song "Is That All There Is?"

In 2004 Price appeared in the Christmas edition of Heartbeat as Frankie Rio, the leader of a dubious band of musicians, the Franke Rio Trio, who are booked to appear in the Aidensfield Village Concert. The episode was entitled "In the Bleak Midwinter".

=== Film appearances ===
- "Get Yourself A College Girl" (1964). Himself
- Dont Look Back (1967), Himself
- O Lucky Man! (1973), Alan, soundtrack
- Alfie Darling (1975), Alfie Elkins, soundtrack
- Britannia Hospital (1982), soundtrack
- The Plague Dogs (1982), soundtrack
- Is That All There Is? (1993), Himself

=== TV appearances ===
- Ready, Steady, Go! – as the Alan Price Set (9 December 1966)
- Beat-Club – 1967–68
- Top of the Pops – 7 April 1966, performing "I Put a Spell on You" with the Alan Price Set
- Top of the Pops – 14 July 1966, performing "Hi Lili, Hi Lo" with the Alan Price Set
- Top of the Pops – 15 February 1968, performing "Don't Stop The Carnival" with the Alan Price Set
- Disco – Episode No. 1.5 as Price and Fame (1971)
- The Two Ronnies – as himself (1972) eight episodes
- Saturday Night Live – as himself (April 1977)
- Top of the Pops(BBC 1 19:20pm) 1978 with Just for you
- Pop Quiz – as himself (25 September 1984)
- Heartbeat – Frankie Rio (a "shifty" musician) "In the Bleak Midwinter" (2004)

== Personal life ==
Price is believed to have two children and has been married twice. He married Maureen Donneky in 1971; they later divorced. Price and Donneky had one daughter, Elizabeth.

In 1990, he married singer Alison Thomas. In 1992, he was living in London with Alison and two daughters.

Price is a Sunderland A.F.C. supporter, although Sunderland's local rivals Newcastle United often used his version of "Blaydon Races" at matches. In 2011, he took part in the Sunderland A.F.C. charity Foundation of Light event.

== Discography ==
- The Price to Play (1966) (with the Alan Price Set)
- A Price on His Head (1967) (with the Alan Price Set)
- Fame & Price / Price & Fame / Together (1971) (with Georgie Fame)
- O Lucky Man! (1973)
- Between Today and Yesterday (1974)
- Metropolitan Man (1975)
- Shouts Across the Street (1976)
- Alan Price (1977)
- Two of a Kind (1977) (with Rob Hoeke)
- England My England (1978)
- Rising Sun (1980)
- Andy Capp (1982) (with Trevor Peacock)
- Geordie Roots & Branches (1982)
- Travellin' Man (1986)
- The Whales of August (1987)
- Liberty (1989)
- Covers (1994) (with the Electric Blues Company)
- A Gigster's Life for Me (1996) (with the Electric Blues Company)
- Based on a True Story (2002)
- Savaloy Dip (2016)

== Awards ==
- 1974 Golden Globe nomination for O Lucky Man!
- 1973 BAFTA (Anthony Asquith Memorial Award) for O Lucky Man
