= Simon Smith and the Amazing Dancing Bear =

- Danish picture sleeve

Single by Alan Price Set
- A-side: "Tickle Me" (double A-side)
- Released: 24 February 1967
- Genre: Pop, ragtime
- Length: 1:58
- Label: Decca
- Songwriter: Randy Newman
- Producer: Ivor Raymonde

Alan Price Set singles chronology
"Willow Weep For Me" (1966)	"Simon Smith and the Amazing Dancing Bear" / "Tickle Me" (1967)	"The House That Jack Built" (1967)

"Simon Smith and the Amazing Dancing Bear" is a song written by Randy Newman, about a young man of modest means who entertains affluent diners with his dancing bear. The Alan Price Set released a version as a double A-side with "Tickle Me" on 24 February 1967, and it reached number four on the Record Retailer chart in Britain. The success brought Newman to public attention as a songwriter; he recorded the song himself for his 1972 album Sail Away.

== Composition ==
Randy Newman wrote the ragtime-influenced song in 1964. He considered it significant in his development as a songwriter, telling Performing Songwriter in 1995 "I was writing a song, believe it or not, for Frank Sinatra Jr. And it was called something like 'Susie' or 'Mary' and I just all of a sudden couldn’t do it. So I ended up somewhere with "coat to wear" and "dancing bear"... ...and then I was never the same. And I never wrote particularly conventional songs after that." Sinatra Jr. never recorded the finished song.

The song concerns Simon Smith, a young man of modest means who entertains affluent ("well-fed") diners with his dancing bear. Biographer Kevin Courrier has described the song as "the first hint of Newman the outsider looking to entertain the world". Newman has alluded to the bear as a gentile who serves to allow Smith to assimilate.

== Recordings ==
Newman first offered "Simon Smith and the Amazing Dancing Bear" to Californian sunshine pop band Harpers Bizarre. Their recording appears on their first album Feelin' Groovy, issued in April 1967. The song was popularised by a recording by the Alan Price Set. Price considered Newman "head and shoulders above anyone else" as a songwriter. His version of the song was issued as a single by Decca Records on 24 February 1967, backed with another Newman composition, "Tickle Me". The single reached number four on the Record Retailer chart in April 1967. Price filmed a promotional clip for the song with two bears from Colchester Zoo. The success earned Newman a record contract with Warner Bros. Records.

Newman's own recording of "Simon Smith and the Amazing Dancing Bear" was featured on his 1972 album Sail Away. A version by Harry Nilsson appears on his 1969 album Harry. A previously unreleased Bobbie Gentry recording of the song, retitled "Salome Smith and Her Amazing Dancing Bear", appears on the 2018 boxset The Girl from Chickasaw County: The Complete Capitol Masters.

== Reception and legacy ==
Upon the release of the Alan Price Set's recording of the song, Peter Jones of Record Mirror described Price as "high on my short list of Most Distinctive Voices" and characterised the song as "jazz-styled and bouncy and smokey and with tremendous punchy piano". Don Short of Daily Mirror doubted the song's hit potential, writing "the song is not so weird as the title, but I can't see the Alan Price Set making the charts with it". Reviewing the week's new singles for Melody Maker, Paul McCartney praised the song and considered it a likely hit, describing it as "so much better than the period, vaudeville stuff because it's still a bit modern".

In 1971, John Cleese chose the Alan Price Set version of the song when he appeared on Desert Island Discs. In 2023, the song was ranked eighth in The Guardian's list of Randy Newman's 20 greatest songs.
