= Randy Newman discography =

Discography of American musician Randy Newman

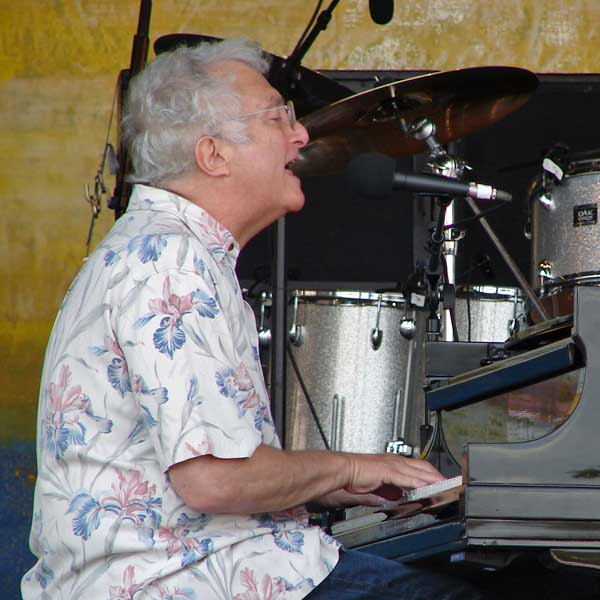
- Newman at the New Orleans Jazz & Heritage Festival, 2008
- Studio albums: 11
- Soundtrack albums: 23
- Live albums: 2
- Compilation albums: 5
- Singles: 15
- Video albums: 2
- Music videos: 14

American musician Randy Newman has released eleven solo studio albums, two live albums, five compilation albums, two extended plays (EPs), 15 singles, one musical, 23 soundtrack albums, 2 video albums and 14 music videos.

== Albums ==
=== Studio albums ===
Title	Album details	Peak chart positions											Certifications
Title	Album details	US	AUS	AUT	BEL	CAN	GER	NL	NZ	NOR	SWI	UK	Certifications
Randy Newman	Released: June 1968; Label: Reprise Records; Formats: LP	—	—	—	—	—	—	—	—	—	—	—	
12 Songs	Released: April 1970; Label: Reprise Records; Formats: LP	—	—	—	—	—	—	—	—	—	—	—	
Sail Away	Released: May 1972; Label: Reprise Records; Formats: LP	163	42	—	—	—	—	—	—	—	—	—	
Good Old Boys	Released: September 10, 1974; Label: Reprise Records; Formats: LP	36	—	—	—	58	—	7	—	—	—	—	
Little Criminals	Released: September 23, 1977; Label: Warner Bros. Records; Formats: LP	9	29	—	—	9	—	3	26	—	—	—	US: Gold
Born Again	Released: August 1979; Label: Warner Bros. Records; Formats: LP	41	65	23	—	81	—	23	—	—	—	—	
Trouble in Paradise	* Released: January 17, 1983: Label: Warner Bros. Records; Formats: LP	64	—	8	—	—	33	9	—	12	—	—	
Land of Dreams	Released: September 1988; Label: Reprise Records; Formats: LP, CD	80	—	—	—	—	—	—	—	—	12	—	
Bad Love	Released: June 1, 1999; Label: DreamWorks Records; Formats: CD	194	—	—	43	—	52	30	—	—	—	—	
Harps and Angels	Released: August 5, 2008; Label: Nonesuch Records; Formats: LP, CD	30	—	29	13	—	25	10	—	17	25	46	
Dark Matter	Released: August 4, 2017; Label: Nonesuch Records; Formats: LP, CD	106	—	35	13	—	48	8	—	—	20	61	

=== Songbooks ===
New solo studio recordings of previously issued compositions.

Title	Album details	Peak chart positions	
Title	Album details	BEL	NL
The Randy Newman Songbook Vol. 1	Released: September 30, 2003; Label: Nonesuch Records; Formats: CD	—	—
The Randy Newman Songbook Vol. 2	Released: May 10, 2011; Label: Nonesuch Records; Formats: CD	92	53
The Randy Newman Songbook Vol. 3	Released: September 30, 2016; Label: Nonesuch Records; Formats: CD, download	111	—

=== Live albums ===
Title	Album details	Peak chart positions	
Title	Album details	US	NL
Randy Newman Live	Released: June 1971; Labels: Reprise Records; Formats: LP	191	–
Live in London	Released: November 8, 2011; Labels: Nonesuch Records; Formats: CD	–	77

=== Compilation albums ===
Title	Album details	Peak chart positions	
Title	Album details	US	NL
Lonely at the Top: The Best of Randy Newman	Released: May 18, 1987; Labels: Warner Bros. Records; Formats: LP, CD	–	–
Guilty: 30 Years of Randy Newman	Released: November 3, 1998; Labels: Rhino Records; Formats: CD	–	–
The Best of Randy Newman	Released: September 18, 2001; Labels: Rhino Records; Formats: CD	–	–
On Vine Street: The Early Songs of Randy Newman	Released: April 1, 2008; Labels: Ace Records; Formats: CD	–	–
The Randy Newman Songbook	Released: September 23, 2016 (LP); December 16, 2016 (CD); Labels: Nonesuch Records; Formats: LP, CD	–	–

=== Musical ===
Title	Album details	Peak chart positions	
Title	Album details	US	NL
Randy Newman's Faust	Released: September 1995; Labels: Reprise Records; Formats: CD, Cassette	–	–

=== Soundtracks ===
Title	Album details	Peak chart positions					Certifications	Notes
Title	Album details	US	US Kids	US Sound.	FRA	SPA	Certifications	Notes
Peyton Place	Released: 1966; Label: Epic Records; Format: LP	—	—	—	—	—		
Ragtime	Released: December 1981; Label: Elektra Records; Format: LP	—	—	—	—	—		
The Natural	Released: May 11, 1984; Label: Warner Bros. Records; Format: LP	202	—	—	—	—		
Parenthood	Released: September 8, 1989; Label: Reprise Records; Format: LP, CD	—	—	—	—	—		
Avalon	Released: December 8, 1990; Label: Reprise Records; Format: CD	—	—	—	—	—		
Awakenings	Released: January 10, 1991; Label: Reprise Records; Format: CD	—	—	—	—	—		
The Paper	Released: March 22, 1994; Label: Reprise Records; Format: CD	—	—	—	—	—		
Maverick	Released: January 10, 1995; Label: Reprise Records; Format: CD	35	—	—	—	—	US: Gold	
Toy Story	Released: November 22, 1995; Label: Walt Disney Records; Format: CD	94	—	—	—	—		
James and the Giant Peach	Released: March 26, 1996; Label: Walt Disney Records; Format: CD	—	—	—	—	—		
Michael	Released: December 17, 1996; Label: Warner Bros. Records; Format: CD	—	—	—	—	—		
A Bug's Life	Released: October 27, 1998; Label: Walt Disney Records; Format: CD	—	—	—	—	—		
Pleasantville	Released: November 17, 1998; Label: Varèse Sarabande; Format: CD	—	—	—	—	—		
Toy Story 2	Released: November 9, 1999; Label: Walt Disney Records; Format: CD	111	—	—	—	—		
Meet the Parents	Released: September 26, 2000; Label: DreamWorks Records; Format: CD	—	—	—	—	—		
Monsters, Inc.	Released: October 23, 2001; Label: Walt Disney Records; Format: CD	—	—	25	—	—		
Seabiscuit	Released: July 22, 2003; Label: Decca Records; Format: CD	—	—	—	—	—		
Meet the Fockers	Released: January 11, 2005; Label: Varèse Sarabande; Format: CD	—	—	—	—	—		
Cars	Released: June 6, 2006; Label: Walt Disney Records; Format: CD	6	—	2	180	—	US: Platinum	
Cold Turkey	Released: December 4, 2007; Label: Percepto Records; Format: CD	—	—	—	—	—		
Leatherheads	Released: March 25, 2008; Label: Varèse Sarabande; Format: CD	—	—	—	—	—		
The Princess and the Frog	Released: November 23, 2009; Label: Walt Disney Records; Format: CD	80	10	7	191	94		Replaced Alan Menken
Toy Story 3	Released: June 15, 2010; Label: Walt Disney Records; Format: CD	145	—	34	—	—		
Monsters University	Released: June 18, 2013; Label: Walt Disney Records; Format: CD	—	—	—	—	—		
Cars 3	Released: June 16, 2017; Label: Walt Disney Records; Format: CD	19	—	10	—	—		
The Meyerowitz Stories	Released: October 13, 2017; Label: IAC Films; Format: CD, LP	—	—	—	—	—		
Toy Story 4	Released: June 21, 2019; Label: Walt Disney Records; Format: CD	122	7	20	—	—		
Marriage Story	Released: December 13, 2019; Label: Lakeshore Records; Format: CD	—	—	—	—	—		
Toy Story 5	Released: June 19, 2026; Label: Lakeshore Records; Format: CD	—	—	—	—	—		

=== Other album appearances ===
Newman composed original songs that were used in the following films, but did not compose the scores for these films:

Year	Song(s)	Album	Notes
1986	"The Ballad of the Three Amigos", "My Little Buttercup", "Blue Shadows"	Three Amigos soundtrack	
1987	"Something Special"	Overboard soundtrack	
1989	"Falling in Love"	Her Alibi soundtrack	
1997	"Danny's Arrival Song", "Little Boat on the Sea", "Animal Jam Session", "Big and Loud", "Tell Me Lies", "Nothing's Gonna Stop Us Now"	Cats Don't Dance soundtrack	
1998	"That'll Do"	Babe: Pig in the City soundtrack	Song performed by Peter Gabriel
2002	"Scorpion's Theme"	Spider-Man: The Movie Video Game soundtrack	

Newman also performed a song he did not write ("Gone Dead Train"), and conducted Jack Nitzsche's original music, for the soundtrack of the 1970 film Performance. In the following year, Newman's song "Let Me Go" was used in the film The Pursuit of Happiness.

Newman's song "I Love L.A." was used in The Naked Gun and Bean: The Ultimate Disaster Movie, and over the end credits of Volcano. Newman's 1972 song "Burn On" was used as the opening song in Major League (1989) while his song "Political Science" was featured in Blast from the Past (1999). Newman also covered the Fats Domino song "I'm In Love Again" for the soundtrack of Shag (1989).

== Singles ==
=== Performed by Randy Newman ===
Title	Year	Peak chart positions							Certification	Album
Title	Year	US	US AC	AUS	CAN Top 100	Canada AC	NZ	UK	Certification	Album
"Golden Gridiron Boy" / "Country Boy"	1962	—	—	—	—	—	—	—		Non-album single
"The Beehive State" / "I Think It's Going to Rain Today"	1968	—	—	—	—	—	—	—		Randy Newman
"Last Night I Had a Dream" / "I Think He's Hiding" (from Randy Newman)	1968	—	—	—	—	—	—	—		Sail Away
"Yellow Man" / "Old Kentucky Home"	1970	—	—	—	—	—	—	—		12 Songs
"Sail Away" / "Political Science"	1972	—	—	—	—	—	—	—		Sail Away
"Birmingham" / "Naked Man"	1974	—	—	—	—	—	—	—		Good Old Boys
"Short People" / "Old Man on the Farm"	1977	2	25	12	2	1	21	—	RIAA: Gold	Little Criminals
"Baltimore" / "You Can't Fool the Fat Man"	1978	—	—	—	—	—	—	—		Little Criminals
"Rider in the Rain" / "Kathleen (Catholicism Made Easier)"	1978	—	—	—	—	—	—	—		Little Criminals
"The Blues" (with Paul Simon) / "Same Girl"	1983	51	36	100	—	—	—	—		Trouble in Paradise
"I Love L.A." / "Miami"	1983	110	—	—	—	—	—	—		Trouble in Paradise
"Dixie Flyer" / "Something Special"	1988	99	—	—	—	—	—	—		Land of Dreams
"It's Money That Matters" / "Falling in Love"	1988	60	—	—	49	—	—	—		Land of Dreams
"A Few Words in Defense of Our Country" (Note: Rolling Stone ranked "A Few Words in Defense of Our Country" number 2 on its list of the 100 Best Songs of 2007.)	2007	—	—	—	—	—	—	—		Harps and Angels
"You've Got a Friend in Me" / "We Belong Together" (from Toy Story 3)	2010	—	—	—	—	40	—	116	RIAA: Platinum; BPI: Platinum	Toy Story

=== Written by Randy Newman ===
The following is a list of Randy Newman compositions that were chart hits for other artists.

Title	Year	Artist	Peak chart positions					
Title	Year	Artist	US	US R&B	AU	CA	NZ	UK
"Anyone Who Knows What Love Is (Will Understand)" co-written with Jeannie Seely, Judith Arbuckle and Pat Sheeran	1964	Irma Thomas	52	—	—	—	—	—
"I Don't Want to Hear Anymore"	1964	Jerry Butler	95	—	—	—	—	—
"I've Been Wrong Before"	1965	Cilla Black	—	—	81	—	—	17
"Nobody Needs Your Love"	1966	Gene Pitney	—	—	—	—	—	2
"Just One Smile"	1966	Gene Pitney	64	—	55	—	10	8
"Simon Smith and His Amazing Dancing Bear"	1967	The Alan Price Set	—	—	49	—	12	4
"I Don't Want to Hear It Anymore"	1969	Dusty Springfield	105	—	—	59	—	—
"Love Story"	1970	Peggy Lee	105	—	—	—	—	—
"Mama Told Me Not to Come"	1970	Three Dog Night	1	—	10	2	13	3
"I Think It's Going to Rain Today"	1970	Tom Northcott	—	—	—	46	—	—
"Mama Told Me Not to Come"	1972	Wilson Pickett	99	16	—	—	—	—
"Living Without You"	1972	Manfred Mann's Earth Band	69	—	—	—	—	—
"I Think It's Going to Rain Today"	1980	UB40	—	—	90	—	6	6
"You Can Leave Your Hat On"	1986	Joe Cocker	35	—	23	—	—	—
"Mama Told Me Not to Come"	2000	Tom Jones & Stereophonics	—	—	—	—	45	4

== Videography ==
=== Video albums ===
- Live at the Odeon (1983) DVD with Ry Cooder and Linda Ronstadt
- Sound Stage (2003) (featuring Lyle Lovett with Mark Isham and Randy Newman)

=== Music videos ===
Year	Title	Album
1977	"Short People"	Little Criminals
1979	"Baltimore"	Little Criminals
1983	"I Love L.A."	Trouble in Paradise
1984	"The Natural"	The Natural soundtrack
1988	"It's Money That Matters"	Land of Dreams
1989	"Falling in Love"	Land of Dreams
1996	"You've Got a Friend in Me" (with Lyle Lovett)	Toy Story soundtrack
2007	"A Few Words in Defense of Our Country"	Harps and Angels
2016	"I'm Dreaming"	The Randy Newman Songbook Vol. 3
2017	"Putin"	Dark Matter

=== Collaborations in music videos ===
Year	Title	Other Performer	Album
1990	"Yakety Yak, Take It Back"	Take It Back Foundation	non-album
1991	"Give Peace a Chance"	Peace Choir	non-album
2020	"Bigger Boat"	Brandy Clark	Your Life Is a Record
2025	"Lonely Avenue"	Jon Batiste	Big Money
