= The Best of Randy Newman =

Compilation album by Randy Newman
- Released: September 18, 2001
- Genre: Rock/pop
- Length: 68:38
- Label: Rhino Records; Warner Brothers Records
- Producer: Randy Newman; David Lees

Randy Newman chronology
Bad Love (1999)	The Best of Randy Newman (2001)	The Randy Newman Songbook Vol. 1 (2003)

Professional ratings
Review scores
Source	Rating
AllMusic	4.5/5 stars

The Best of Randy Newman is the third compilation album by Randy Newman. This album was released by Rhino Records in 2001.

== Critical reception ==
Stephen Thomas Erlewine of AllMusic writes "a collection like The Best of Randy Newman isn't simply welcome, it's necessary" and goes on to say "This may not be every longtime fan's choice for the very best of Randy Newman, but it does give a good sense of his genius and how far-reaching it is by featuring all those previously mentioned songs, along with many others that confirm the depth of his talent."

"Short People" peaked at No. 2 on January 28, 1978 on the Billboard Hot 100.

In 1996, "You've Got a Friend in Me" from Toy Story was nominated for Best Original Song at the Academy Awards as well as for Best Original Song at the Golden Globe Awards.

== Track listing ==
All tracks are written by Randy Newman.

No.	Title	Original album	Length
1.	"Mama Told Me Not to Come"	12 Songs (1970)	2:09
2.	"You Can Leave Your Hat On"	Sail Away (1972)	3:17
3.	"I Think It's Going to Rain Today"	Randy Newman (1968)	2:57
4.	"Sail Away"	Sail Away	2:48
5.	"Political Science"	Sail Away	1:57
6.	"Rednecks"	Good Old Boys (1974)	3:07
7.	"Marie"	Good Old Boys	3:07
8.	"Louisiana 1927"	Good Old Boys	2:54
9.	"Short People"	Little Criminals (1977)	2:52
10.	"Little Criminals"	Little Criminals	2:59
11.	"It's Money That I Love"	Born Again (1979)	3:37
12.	"I Love L.A."	Trouble in Paradise (1983)	3:28
13.	"Miami"	Trouble in Paradise	4:00
14.	"Take Me Back"	Trouble in Paradise	4:08
15.	"Same Girl"	Trouble in Paradise	2:51
16.	"Dixie Flyer"	Land of Dreams (1988)	4:06
17.	"Happy Ending"	Randy Newman's Faust (1995)	3:14
18.	"You've Got a Friend in Me"	Toy Story (1995)	2:02
19.	"Feels Like Home" (Live 1996)	Guilty: 30 Years of Randy Newman (1998)	4:10
20.	"Shame"	Bad Love (1999)	4:51
21.	"I Miss You"	Bad Love	3:54
Total length:			68:38

- Track information and credits taken from the album's liner notes.
