= The Ballad of the Lonesome Cowboy =

Promotional single by Chris Stapleton

from the album Toy Story 4
- Released: June 5, 2019
- Studio: Blackbird Studio
- Genre: Country
- Length: 1:51
- Label: Walt Disney
- Songwriter: Randy Newman

"The Ballad of the Lonesome Cowboy" is a song written and composed by Randy Newman, and performed by Chris Stapleton, for the soundtrack to the Disney/Pixar feature film Toy Story 4. The song was released on June 5, 2019, and was met with a positive reception from critics.

== Background and composition ==
Randy Newman, known for his work as composer and songwriter on the Toy Story films, was confirmed to be returning for Toy Story 4 (2019). The song "The Ballad of the Lonesome Cowboy" from the soundtrack, written by Newman and performed by Chris Stapleton, was released on June 5, 2019. Newman also performed a version for the credits and soundtrack of Toy Story 4. The song is written from the perspective of Sheriff Woody, the film's main character, because, according to Newman, "[Woody] feels like he was a lonesome cowboy until someone comes along and changes his world."

== Reception ==
Rania Aniftos of Billboard praised the song's melody as "catchy". Nick Evans of CinemaBlend positively compared the song to Newman's previous songs from the Toy Story films, describing it as "equal parts tear-jerking and heartwarming", "in keeping with the tradition of Toy Story songs". Similarly, Ming Lee Newcomb of Consequence of Sound compared the song to Newman's "You've Got a Friend in Me" from the first film, adding that "the charming Western ballad is similarly feel-good and kid-friendly". Angela Stefano of The Boot wrote that "[n]ot only is Pixar making childhood dreams come true with the release of a new Toy Story movie, they're making country music dreams come true, too" praising Newman's lyrics as "heartfelt yet childlike" and Stapleton's singing as "instantly recognizable".

== Personnel ==
- Vance Powell – recording engineer and mixer
- J.T. Cure – bass guitar
- Derek Mixon – drums
- Chris Stapleton – vocals and guitar
- Matt Rollings – piano
- Paul Franklin – steel guitar
