= Toy Story 4 (soundtrack) =

2019 soundtrack album by Randy Newman

Toy Story 4 (Original Motion Picture Soundtrack)

Soundtrack album by Randy Newman
- Released: June 21, 2019
- Recorded: 2018–2019
- Studios: The Newman Scoring Stage, Twentieth Century Fox Studios
- Genre: Film score
- Length: 72:37
- Label: Walt Disney
- Producer: Randy Newman

Randy Newman chronology
The Meyerowitz Stories (2017)	Toy Story 4 (2019)	Marriage Story (2019)

Singles from Toy Story 4 (Original Motion Picture Soundtrack)
- 1. "The Ballad of the Lonesome Cowboy" Released: June 5, 2019

Toy Story 4 (Original Motion Picture Soundtrack) is the soundtrack album for the 2019 film Toy Story 4, the fourth installment in the Toy Story franchise, created by Pixar Animation Studios and released by Walt Disney Pictures. Randy Newman, who composed and conducted for the previous installments returned to score the film. Unlike the previous installments, the score was recorded at The Newman Scoring Stage, Twentieth Century Fox Studios. The soundtrack featured Newman's score along with three original songs, which were released by Walt Disney Records on June 21, 2019, with the film. In addition to the English-language, the soundtrack album was released in Spanish (Castilian), Spanish (Neutral), Italian, Portuguese, Vietnamese, Mandarin, Kazakh, Korean, Japanese, Russian and Polish languages.

== Development ==
Randy Newman confirmed his involvement in Toy Story 4 during the 2015 D23 Expo. Director Josh Cooley said that he hired him to return because he "can't imagine making a fourth [film] without Randy Newman." Stating his inclusion, Cooley in an interview to Variety magazine, said that "There were three people that I wanted to make sure were feeling the story: Tom [Hanks], Tim [Allen] and Randy. It took a while to get this story right, but once we were feeling right about it, we went to Randy's house and pitched him. It was so important for me to have his approval." About the film's music, Newman had said:

This one was easier in a way. It's hard keeping the emotional level sustained for as long as this one required. But in some ways it was easier, because I could use bits and pieces of music that I had from before [during 1995].

Recording of the film's score began with three sessions being conducted in September 2018, January and June 2019, in a span of around eight to ten months. Newman wrote new themes for Bonnie, Gabby Gabby, and Duke Caboom, with the latter's featuring accordions and mandolins to represent the character's memories of rejection. He also wrote a "subordinate theme" for Forky. Newman also reused his previous orchestral themes from the first three films. He wrote two new songs for the film, titled "The Ballad of the Lonesome Cowboy" and "I Can't Let You Throw Yourself Away", with Newman also performing the latter. The Los Angeles Orchestra performed the orchestral music during the third session.

On June 5, 2019, Chris Stapleton's version of "Cowboy" was released as a single. The film's soundtrack, featuring Newman's score, Stapleton's and Newman's versions of the two new songs, and Newman's "You've Got a Friend in Me", was released on June 21, 2019, coinciding with the film's theatrical release.

== Track listing ==
All tracks are written by Randy Newman. All tracks are performed by Randy Newman, except where noted.

Toy Story 4 (Original Motion Picture Soundtrack) track listing
No.	Title	Performer(s)	Length
1.	"You've Got a Friend in Me"		2:04
2.	"I Can't Let You Throw Yourself Away"		2:05
3.	"The Ballad of the Lonesome Cowboy"	Newman; Chris Stapleton (vocals)	1:51
4.	"Operation Pull Toy"		5:19
5.	"Woody's Closet of Neglect"		3:55
6.	"School Daze"		4:22
7.	"Trash Can Chronicles"		3:28
8.	"The Road to Antiques"		2:41
9.	"A Spork in the Road"		1:56
10.	"Rubber Baby Buggy Butlers"		1:52
11.	"Buzz's Flight & A Maiden"		4:07
12.	"Ducky, Bunny, & Tea"		2:16
13.	"Moving at the Speed of Skunk"		1:34
14.	"Bo Peep's Panorama for Two"		2:36
15.	"Three Sheeps to the Wind"		2:55
16.	"Sneaking and Antiquing"		1:42
17.	"Recruiting Duke Caboom"		1:16
18.	"Prepping the Jump"		2:20
19.	"Let's Caboom!"		4:07
20.	"Cowboy Sacrifice"		2:06
21.	"Operation Harmony"		4:24
22.	"Duke's Best Crash Ever"		2:43
23.	"Gabby Gabby's Most Noble Thing"		3:02
24.	"Parting Gifts & New Horizons"		5:05
25.	"The Ballad of the Lonesome Cowboy" (Soundtrack Version)		1:51
26.	"Plush Rush!"		1:12

Istoriya igrushek 4 (Originalnyi Saundtrek) track listing
No.	Title	Performer(s)	Length
1.	"Ya tvoy horoshiy drug"	Mikhail Ryzhov	2:04
2.	"Ty ne vzdumai"	Sergey Manukyan	2:05

Toy Story 4 (Banda Sonora Original en Castellano) track listing
No.	Title	Performer(s)	Length
1.	"Hay un amigo en mí"	José María Guzmán	2:04
2.	"No dejaré que te eches a perder"	José María Guzmán	2:05

Toy Story 4 (Banda Sonora Original en Español) track listing
No.	Title	Performer(s)	Length
1.	"Yo Soy Tu Amigo Fiel"	Hector Ortiz	2:04
2.	"No Acepto"	Hector Ortiz	2:05

Toy Story 4 (Colonna Sonora Originale) track listing
No.	Title	Performer(s)	Length
1.	"Hai un amico in me" (Solo)	Riccardo Cocciante	2:04
2.	"Non permetto"	Riccardo Cocciante	2:05
3.	"Hai un amico in me" (Duet)	Benji & Fede	2:10

Toy Story 4 (Korean Original Motion Picture Soundtrack) track listing
No.	Title	Performer(s)	Length
1.	"You've Got a Friend in Me"	Jang-Won Lee	2:04
2.	"I Can't Let You Throw Yourself Away"	Ki-Youn Sung	2:05
3.	"The Ballad of the Lonesome Cowboy"	Cheol-Kyu Lee	1:45

Toy Story 4 (Mandarin Original Motion Picture Soundtrack) track listing
No.	Title	Performer(s)	Length
1.	"You've Got a Friend in Me"	Shichao Liu	2:04
2.	"I Can't Let You Throw Yourself Away"	Shichao Liu	2:05

Toy Story 4 (Mandarin Original Motion Picture Soundtrack) track listing
No.	Title	Performer(s)	Length
1.	"You've Got a Friend in Me"	Shichao Liu	2:04
2.	"I Can't Let You Throw Yourself Away"	Shichao Liu	2:05

Toy Story 4 (Trilha Sonora Original em Português) track listing
No.	Title	Performer(s)	Length
1.	"Amigo Estou Aqui"	Zé Da Viola	2:04
2.	"Seu Destino"	Zé Da Viola	2:05

Toy Story 4 (Vietnamese Original Motion Picture Soundtrack) track listing
No.	Title	Performer(s)	Length
1.	"Chỉ Có Tôi Là Bạn Thân"	Trình Bày	2:04
2.	"Không Thể Xa Rời"	Trình Bày	2:05

Toy Story 4 (Japanese Original Motion Picture Soundtrack) track listing
No.	Title	Performer(s)	Length
1.	"You've Got a Friend in Me"	Diamond Yukai	2:04
2.	"I Can't Let You Throw Yourself Away"	Diamond Yukai	2:05

Toy Story 4 (Japanese Original Motion Picture Soundtrack) track listing
No.	Title	Performer(s)	Length
1.	"You've Got a Friend in Me"	Diamond Yukai	2:04
2.	"I Can't Let You Throw Yourself Away"	Diamond Yukai	2:05

Toy Story 4 (Originalnyi saundtrek k a/f – Kazakhskaya versiya) track listing
No.	Title	Performer(s)	Length
1.	"Ya tvoy horoshiy drug"	Daniyar Otegen	2:04
2.	"Ty ne vzdumai"	Daniyar Otegen	2:05
3.	"Ballada odinokogo Kovboya" (Kazakhskaya versiya)	Daniyar Otegen	2:05

Toy Story 4 (Ścieżka Dźwiękowa z Filmu) track listing
No.	Title	Performer(s)	Length
1.	"Druha we mnie masz"	Stanisław Soyka	2:04
2.	"Ja ci nie dam tak zmarnować się"	Tomasz Organek	2:05

== Charts ==
Chart (2010)	Peak position
UK Soundtrack Albums (OCC)	43
US Billboard 200	122

== Accolades ==
Award	Date of ceremony	Category	Recipient(s)	Result	Ref.
Satellite Awards	December 19, 2019	Best Original Song	Randy Newman (for "The Ballad of the Lonesome Cowboy")	Nominated	
Annie Awards	January 25, 2020	Outstanding Achievement for Music in an Animated Feature Production	Randy Newman	Nominated	
Grammy Awards	January 26, 2020	Best Song Written for Visual Media	Randy Newman (for "The Ballad of the Lonesome Cowboy")	Nominated	
Academy Awards	February 9, 2020	Best Original Song	Randy Newman (for "I Can't Let You Throw Yourself Away")	Nominated	
