= Michael Boddicker =

American composer

Michael Lehmann Boddicker
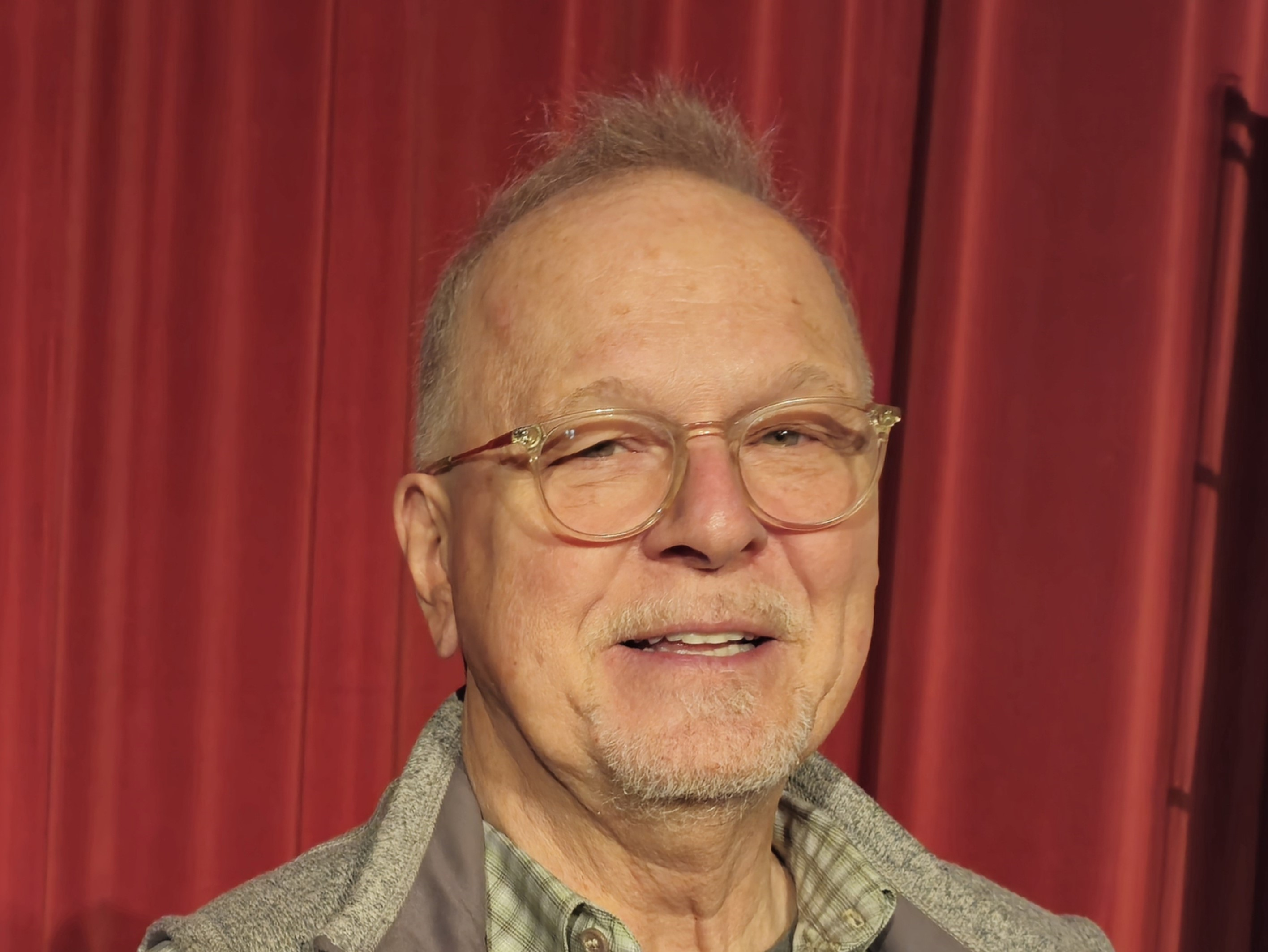
- Boddicker In 2025
- Born: Michael J. Boddicker; January 19, 1953 (age 73); Cedar Rapids, Iowa, U.S.
- Education: Coe College, University of Wisconsin, University of Iowa
- Known for: Music composer; film composer; sessions musician
- Style: Synthesizer; electronic musician
- Spouses: Cassandra Lee Jensen (m. 1972; div. 1980) Edie Lehmann (m. 1995)

Michael Lehmann Boddicker (born January 19, 1953) is an American film composer and session musician, specializing in electronic music. He is a three times National Academy of Recording Arts and Sciences (N.A.R.A.S.) Most Valuable Player "Synthesizer" and MVP Emeritus, he was awarded a Grammy as a songwriter for "Imagination" from Flashdance in 1984. He is the president of The Lehmann Boddicker Group.

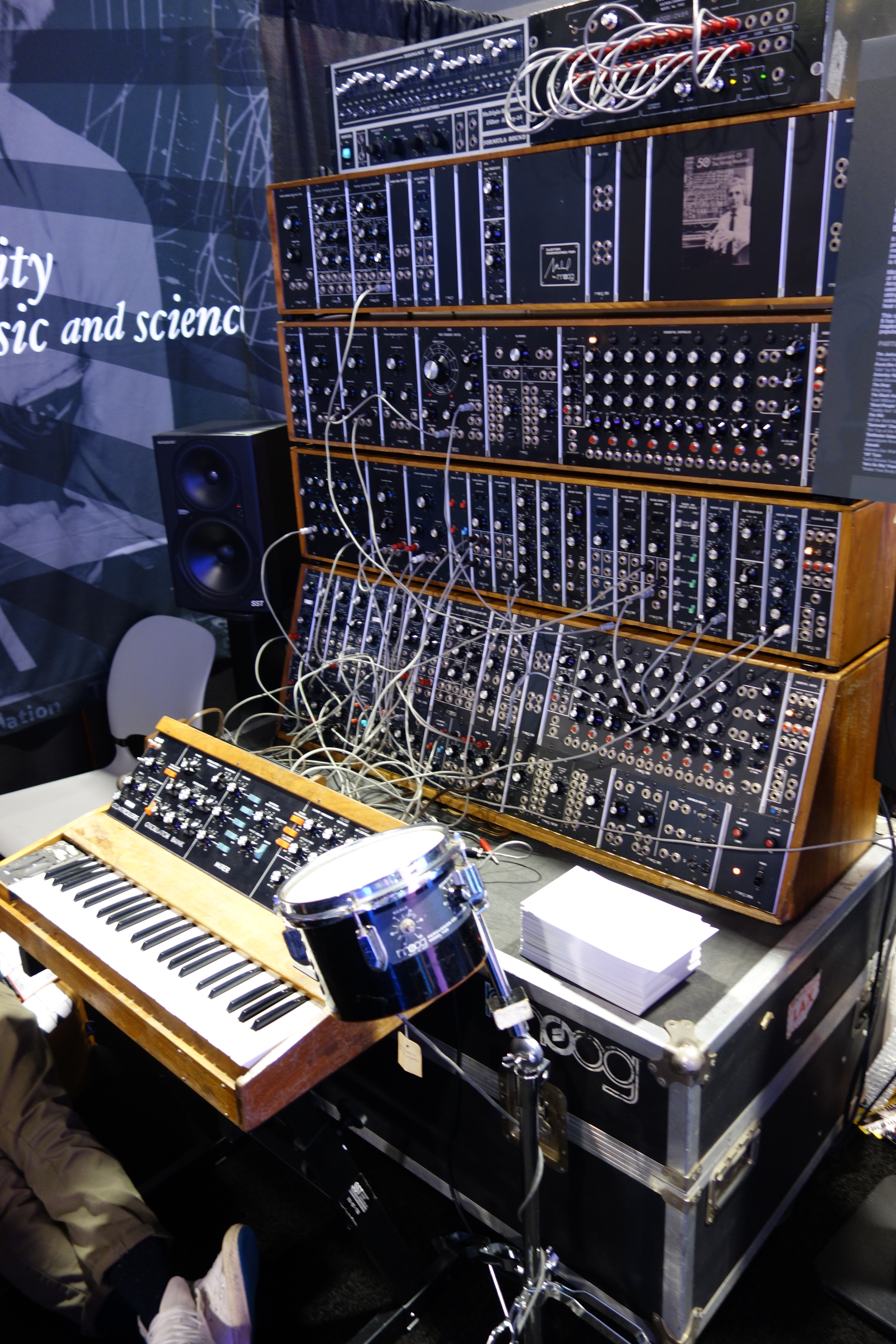
Michael Boddicker Modular System exhibited at Winter NAMM 2015: Bode Vocoder 7702 (1979); Formula Sound Multiple Resonance Filter Array (1979); Moog System 55 modular (1976); Minimoog (1975)

== Early life and education ==
Michael J. Boddicker was born on January 19, 1953, in Cedar Rapids, Iowa. His parents, Arlene Estelle (née Reyman) and Gerald "Jerry" Valentine Boddicker operated a music school and store in Cedar Rapids, which served students in all of Eastern Iowa. His mother was a nationally recognized accordionist.

While still attending Jefferson High School in Cedar Rapids in 1971, Boddicker enrolled full-time at the local Coe College, studying electronic music. By 1972, he continued studies at Coe College, focused on music composition and he started taking jazz studies at the University of Wisconsin. By 1973, he enrolled in 20th-century composition at the University of Iowa. That same year in 1973, Michael purchased a powerful portable semi-modular synthesizer, the ARP 2600.

By 1974, Michael moved to Los Angeles and found Paul Beaver as a mentor.

== Career ==
He was able to purchase a Minimoog and a Moog System 15 modular synthesizer by 1975. As a result of his purchase, he was asked by Bob Moog (the founder of Moog Music) to demonstrate their newest synthesizer, the Polymoog, at the 1975 summer NAMM Show.

He quickly found work as a session musician, and by 1977 appeared playing synthesizer, vocoder, accordion and keyboards on albums by many notables such as Quincy Jones, Randy Newman, The Manhattan Transfer and The Bee Gees.

One of Boddicker's earliest soundtrack collaborations of note was a score for a short experimental claymation film made by Gumby creator Art Clokey entitled "Mandala" (released in 1977). Soon after that he entered the mainstream with work on such films as Saturday Night Fever, Battlestar Galactica and The Wiz.

Boddicker is a Board Member of The Society of Composers and Lyricists (SCL), of Beverly Hills, California. He owns an audio post production facility, Sol7 (aka Sol Seven), in the Sherman Oaks neighborhood of Los Angeles, California.

In 2019, he co-founded the Los Angeles synthesizer music festival, Synthplex.

== Personal life ==
Boddicker was married to Cassandra Lee Jensen, from 1972 to 1980, ending in divorce. Boddicker officially changed his name to Michael Lehmann Boddicker when he married singer/conductor/actress Edie Lehmann on October 15, 1995 in Hollywood, California. He has four children, two of the children he had were with Edie Lehmann. They live in Southern California.

He sued Michael Jackson's estate in 2016, alleging that he was unpaid for work and services provided early in his professional relationship with Michael Jackson.

== Awards ==
He was awarded a Grammy Award as a songwriter for "Imagination," from the movie Flashdance in 1984.

Boddicker was voted most valuable synthesizer player in 1981, 1982, 1984 by the National Academy of Recording Arts and Sciences. In 1991, in recognition of his achievements, contributions and furtherance of electronic music in the recording industry, he was presented with an honorary doctorate of music from Coe College. In 2003, Boddicker was inducted to the Iowa Rock 'n Roll Hall of Fame.

== Film music ==
Among his film score credits as a composer are The Adventures of Buckaroo Banzai Across the 8th Dimension (1984), the score for The Adventures of Milo and Otis (1986), and additional music for Bulletproof (1996), The Magic Egg: A Computer Odyssey (1984) an animated film, Get Crazy (1983), White Water Summer (1987), F/X2 (1991) with Lalo Schifrin, and Starfire (1992).

His contributions as a composer can also be heard in the film Battlestar Galactica (1978) which include the Battlestar Galactica theme song produced and arranged by Michael Boddicker. Freejack (1992), Michael Jackson's "Black or White" (music video), and "HIStory" (music video) video produced by and additional music underscore and "THE FLY" eleven cues to augment or replace the original score.

Artists that have recorded his songs and compositions include Lani Hall ("Go For The Heart"), Earth, Wind and Fire ("Opening Raise Tour"), Patti Austin ("Oh, No Margarita"), Michael Jackson ("Captain EO & HIStory Unveiling"), Isao Tomita's & YMO's Hideki Matsutake ("Automatic Collect", "Automatic Correct & Plan"), Kitaro ("The Silk Road"), Laura Branigan (Imagination) and David Hasselhoff.

He also performed on soundtrack of the Horizons attraction Walt Disney World's Epcot theme park.

== Performer ==
As a session musician he played synthesizer on, among others, Michael Jackson's This Is It, HIStory, Thriller, Bad, Off the Wall', Dangerous, Black or White, and We Are the World; Earth, Wind & Fire's Let's Groove; Lionel Richie's Hello, You Are, Running with the Night; Dazz Band's Let It Whip; Randy Newman's The Natural and Short People; Kenny Loggins' Footloose; Cyndi Lauper's The Goonies 'R' Good Enough; Barbra Streisand's Somewhere; Cheap Trick's Surrender; The Jacksons' Shake Your Body; Pointer Sisters' He's So Shy; and Diana Ross's Missing You.

Select list, as performer
| Year | Song | Album | Artist(s) | Performed | Notes |
|---|---|---|---|---|---|
| 1976 | | I Heard That!! | Quincy Jones | | |
| 1976 | I'll Be Good to You | | The Brothers Johnson | | |
| 1977 | | Roots (1977 miniseries) soundtrack | Various | Synthesizer | With Quincy Jones, performed on keyboard. |
| 1977 | | Little Criminals | Randy Newman | Synthesizer | named as "Mike Boddicker" |
| 1977 | | Superman | Barbra Streisand | | named as "Mike Boddicker" |
| 1978 | | Sounds...and Stuff Like That!! | Quincy Jones | Synthesizer | |
| 1978 | Please Don't Keep Me Waiting | Totally Hot | Olivia Newton-John | Synthesizer | |
| 1978 | Dancin' 'Round and 'Round | Totally Hot | Olivia Newton-John | Synthesizer | |
| 1979 | Rock With You | Off the Wall | Michael Jackson | Synthesizer | Synthesizers with Greg Phillinganes. |
| 1979 | Off The Wall | Off the Wall | Michael Jackson | Synthesizer | |
| 1979 | I Can't Help It | Off the Wall | Michael Jackson | Synthesizer | |
| 1979 | | No One Home | Lalo Schifrin | | |
| 1979 | One Voice | One Voice | Barry Manilow | Synthesizer | |
| 1979 | (Why Don't We Try) A Slow Dance | One Voice | Barry Manilow | Synthesizer | |
| 1979 | Rain | One Voice | Barry Manilow | Synthesizer | |
| 1979 | Ships | One Voice | Barry Manilow | Synthesizer | |
| 1979 | You Could Show Me | One Voice | Barry Manilow | Synthesizer | |
| 1979 | I Don't Want To Walk Without You | One Voice | Barry Manilow | Synthesizer | |
| 1979 | Who's Been Sleeping In My Bed | One Voice | Barry Manilow | Synthesizer | |
| 1979 | Where Are They Now | One Voice | Barry Manilow | Synthesizer | |
| 1979 | Bobbie Lee (What's The Difference, I Gotta Live) | One Voice | Barry Manilow | Synthesizer | |
| 1979 | When I Wanted You | One Voice | Barry Manilow | Synthesizer | |
| 1979 | Sunday Father | One Voice | Barry Manilow | Synthesizer | |
| 1979 | It's Money That I Love | Born Again | Randy Newman | Synthesizer | |
| 1979 | The Story Of A Rock And Roll Band | Born Again | Randy Newman | Synthesizer | |
| 1979 | Pretty Boy | Born Again | Randy Newman | Synthesizer | |
| 1979 | Mr. Sheep | Born Again | Randy Newman | Synthesizer | |
| 1979 | Spies | Born Again | Randy Newman | Synthesizer | |
| 1979 | Half A Man | Born Again | Randy Newman | Synthesizer | |
| 1979 | William Brown | Born Again | Randy Newman | Synthesizer | |
| 1979 | Pants | Born Again | Randy Newman | Synthesizer | |
| 1980 | | He Who Rides the Tiger | Bernie Taupin | Synthesizer, keyboards, programming | |
| 1981 | Landslide | Physical | Olivia Newton-John | Synthesizer | |
| 1981 | Stranger's Touch | Physical | Olivia Newton-John | Synthesizer | |
| 1981 | Falling | Physical | Olivia Newton-John | Synthesizer | |
| 1981 | Love Make Me Strong | Physical | Olivia Newton-John | Synthesizer, piano, vocoder | |
| 1981 | Silvery Rain | Physical | Olivia Newton-John | Synthesizer | |
| 1981 | Carried Away | Physical | Olivia Newton-John | PPG Wave 2 | |
| 1981 | The Promise (The Dolphin Song) | Physical | Olivia Newton-John | | |
| 1982 | Let It Whip | | Dazz Band | | |
| 1982 | You Are | Lionel Richie | Lionel Richie | | |
| 1982 | Muscles | | Diana Ross | Synthesizer | |
| 1982 | Wanna Be Startin' Somethin' | Thriller | Michael Jackson | Synthesizer, background vocals | |
| 1982 | Baby Be Mine | Thriller | Michael Jackson | Synthesizer, background vocals | |
| 1982 | Billie Jean | Thriller | Michael Jackson | Emulator | |
| 1982 | Human Nature | Thriller | Michael Jackson | Emulator | |
| 1982 | P.Y.T. (Pretty Young Thing) | Thriller | Michael Jackson | Emulator, vocoder | |
| 1982 | The Lady in My Life | Thriller | Michael Jackson | Emulator | |
| | This Is It | | Michael Jackson | | |
| 1983 | I Love L.A. | Trouble In Paradise | Randy Newman | Synthesizers | |
| 1984 | | Chicago 17 | Chicago | | |
| 1984 | Missing You | | Diana Ross | | |
| 1984 | Penny Lover | Can't Slow Down | Lionel Richie | | |
| 1984 | Running with the Night | Can't Slow Down | Lionel Richie | Synthesizer, vocoder | |
| 1984 | Stuck on You | Can't Slow Down | Lionel Richie | | |
| 1984 | | 1100 Bel Air Place | Julio Iglesias | Keyboards | |
| 1985 | We Are The World | | USA For Africa, various | Synthesizer, programming | (Grammy Award Winner). |
| 1985 | The Goonies 'R' Good Enough | Cyndi Lauper | Cyndi Lauper | Synthesizer | |
| 1985 | Greatest Love Of All | Whitney Houston | Whitney Houston | | |
| 1985 | Somewhere | The Broadway Album | Barbra Streisand | | (Grammy Award Winner) |
| 1986 | | Chicago 18 | Chicago | | |
| 1986 | They Don't Make Them Like They Used To | Tough Guys (movie soundtrack) | Kenny Rogers | | |
| 1986 | | Dancing on the Ceiling | Lionel Richie | | (Grammy Award Winner) |
| 1987 | | Bad | Michael Jackson | | |
| 1989 | Back on the Block | Back on the Block | Quincy Jones | drum machine | |
| 1989 | Setembro (Brazilian Wedding Song) | Back on the Block | Quincy Jones | M1 pads, synth pads | |
| 1989 | I'll Be Good to You | Back on the Block | Quincy Jones | Synthesizer, programming | |
| 1989 | The Places You Find Love | Back on the Block | Quincy Jones | Synthesizer, programming | |
| 1989 | Birdland | Back on the Block | Quincy Jones | Synthesizer, programming | |
| 1991 | Black Or White | Dangerous | Michael Jackson | | |
| 1991 | Jam | Dangerous | Michael Jackson | | |
| 1991 | Heal the World | Dangerous | Michael Jackson | | |
| 1991 | Will You Be There | Dangerous | Michael Jackson | | |
| 1991 | Keep The Faith | Dangerous | Michael Jackson | | |
| 1991 | Gone Too Soon | Dangerous | Michael Jackson | | |
| 1995 | Earth Song (single) | | Michael Jackson | | |
| 1995 | | HIStory: Past, Present and Future, Book I | Michael Jackson | | |
| 1996 | They Don't Care About Us | | Michael Jackson | | |

== Music department for television ==
Select list, as music department for television
| Year(s) | Television series | Performed | Notes |
|---|---|---|---|
| 1982–1983 | St. Elsewhere | Synthesizer | 22 episodes |
| 1982–1985 | Knight Rider | Synthesizer | 43 episodes |
| 1984 | Night Court | Synthesizer | 13 episodes |
| 1985–1986 | Family Ties | Synthesizer | 24 episodes |
| 2001 | Michael Jackson: 30th Anniversary Celebration (television special) | Keyboards | 1 episode |
| 2002–2003 | Will & Grace | Synthesizer | 24 episodes |
| 2003 | Boomtown | Synthesizer | 6 episodes |
| 2004–2005 | The Simpsons | Synthesizer | 21 episodes |
| 2014–2015 | Scandal | Synthesizer | 22 episodes |
