= I Love L.A. =

1983 song by Randy Newman

Single by Randy Newman

from the album Trouble in Paradise
- Released: 1983
- Studio: Warner Bros. Recording Studios, Hollywood
- Genre: Pop rock
- Length: 3:29
- Label: Warner Bros.
- Songwriter: Randy Newman
- Producers: Russ Titelman, Lenny Waronker

Randy Newman singles chronology
"The Blues" (1983)	"I Love L.A." (1983)	"Dixie Flyer" (1988)

"I Love L.A." is a song by the American singer Randy Newman. It was originally released on his 1983 album Trouble in Paradise. The song is about Los Angeles, California, Newman's hometown. Its hook is its title, repeated, each time followed by an enthusiastic crowd cheering, "We love it!" The video for the song shows Newman and model Laura Howard driving around Los Angeles in a convertible.

== Writing and recording ==
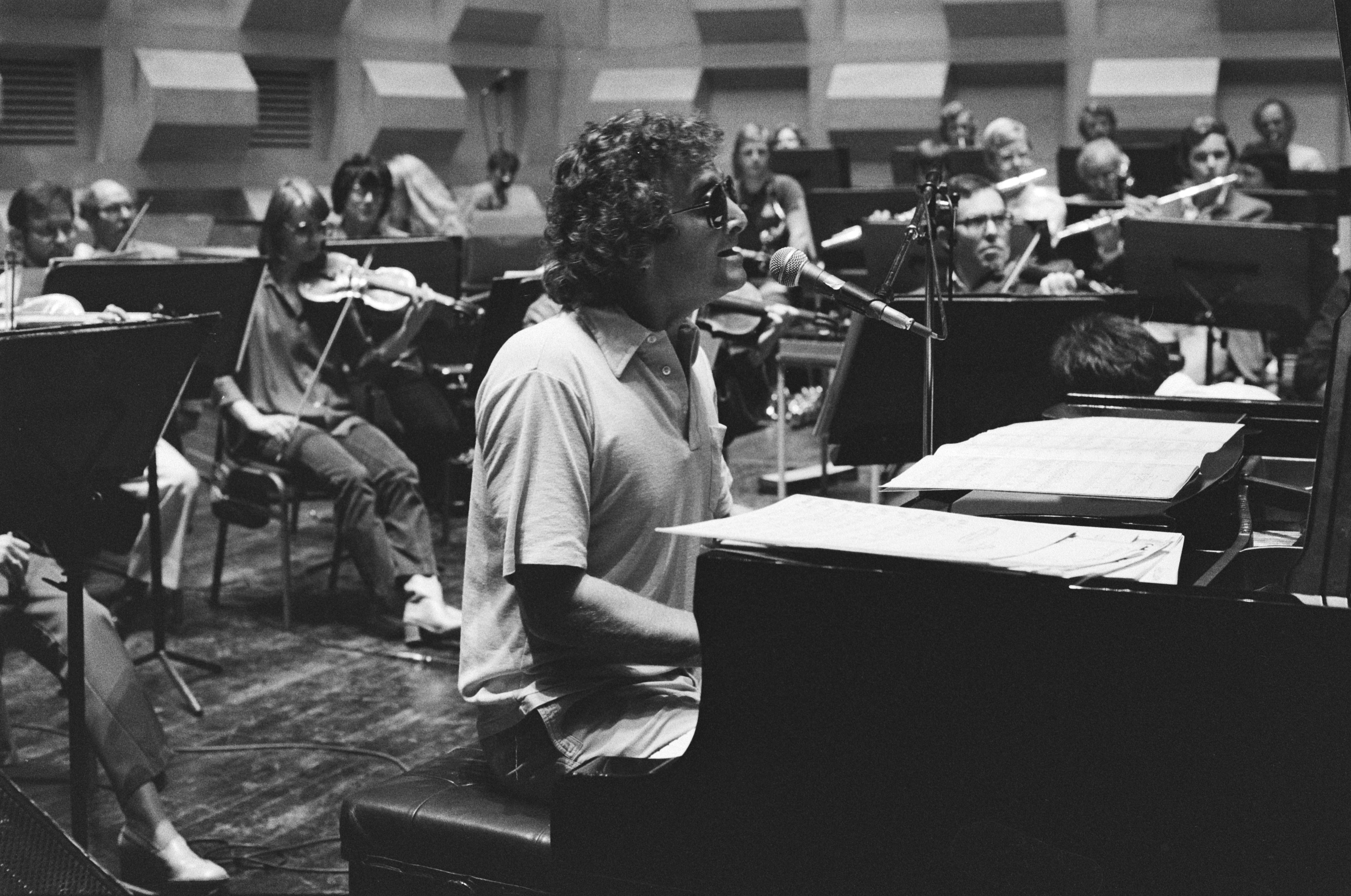
Randy Newman in 1979

Following the release of his sixth album Born Again (1979), Newman procrastinated writing songs for a follow-up album, and spent a good portion of the next four years relaxing at home with his family. Newman jokingly noted that because he often lounged by the pool, the gardener had to water around him. To counter this lackadaisical lifestyle, Newman rented a recording studio in Los Angeles in 1983, which did not have any telephones to distract him. In this studio Newman recorded a song called "Something to Sing About", in which the narrator arrogantly boasts about the suburban opulence around him. Album producer Lenny Waronker disliked "Something to Sing About" and opted not to include it on the singer's upcoming album.

Although "Something to Sing About" was not used, the song's message of delusion and arrogance served as an inspiration for "I Love L.A." Another source of inspiration came from a conversation Newman had with Eagles drummer Don Henley while on an airplane. Henley told him that he could no longer afford to charter Learjets, to which Newman sarcastically responded: "Jesus that's tough...you can't live on a million a year anymore". During the same flight, Henley suggested Newman should write a song about Los Angeles, as he was a native of the city. This conversation, as well as "Something to Sing About", not only served as the inspiration for "I Love L.A.", but also the themes of hedonism and disillusion found in the song's parent album Trouble in Paradise.

"I Love L.A." and the rest of the songs from Trouble in Paradise were recorded at Warner Bros. Recording Studios in Hollywood, with producers Waronker and Russ Titelman. Mark Linett served as the audio and mixing engineer, while Bobby Hata was the audio master. Several members of the rock band Toto provided groove instrumentation, and Waddy Wachtel played the rhythm guitar.

== Composition ==
AllMusic's Matthew Greenwald believes "I Love L.A." is Newman's only attempt at writing an "anthem", as the song features an energetic and buoyant melody not commonly found in the singer's previous music. "I Love L.A." begins with a soft opening verse, which features electric piano and saxophone instrumentation. The opening verse borrows the melody of Rodgers and Hart's 1937 song "The Lady Is a Tramp". Newman begins this verse by deriding New York City as a place where "people dressed like monkeys", and saying Chicago should be left to the "Eskimos". The soft verse then transitions to a more upbeat, pop rock driven melody, influenced by the sound of the Beach Boys. This influence is evidenced when Newman name-drops the band in the lyrics, as well as alluding to their 1963 song "Surfin' U.S.A."

"I Love L.A."
A twenty-one second sample of "I Love L.A." In the chorus Newman sings the phrase "I love L.A.", while Christine McVie and Lindsey Buckingham respond with "We love it".

Following the musical shift, the lyrics now depict Newman driving down Imperial Highway in Los Angeles with a "big nasty redhead" at his side. Newman sings about rolling down the windows and pulling back the top of his convertible as he feels the Santa Ana winds brush against him. He proceeds to name-drop several regions in Los Angeles such as South Bay, the Valley, the Westside, and the Eastside and how everyone in these regions are happy because the sun is shining. The chorus features Newman singing the phrase "I love L.A." several times, while Christine McVie and Lindsey Buckingham of the band Fleetwood Mac respond each time with "We love it".

After the first chorus, the music temporarily shifts to a new section that removes the guitar and heavily emphasizes the synthesizer, before returning to its original melody in a different key. Newman proceeds to point out various objects and people, such as Matterhorn Bobsleds, palm trees, homeless people, and beautiful California women. Newman then name-drops several famous streets in Los Angeles: Century Boulevard, Victory Boulevard, Santa Monica Boulevard, and the Sixth Street Viaduct. Each time he says the name of a road, McVie and Buckingham respond with the phrase "We love it". A guitar solo (played by Toto's Steve Lukather) follows, before the song ends with the chorus.

=== Lyrical analysis ===
Newman is well known for his sardonic lyrics, as he would often write a song from a character's perspective and mock the first-person character and others like them. This style of songwriting can be seen in some of Newman's other songs, such as the slaveholder's perspective in "Sail Away" (1972), and the redneck perspective in "Rednecks" (1974). Despite its lively sound, "I Love L.A." also includes these sardonic lyrics, specifically about the shallow and dark aspects of Los Angeles. When Newman is listing off various sites in Los Angeles, Newman is discussing how residents will talk about the lavish excess of the city (palm trees, beautiful women) in an attempt to hide the squalor (a homeless man begging for money).

Nicholas Pell of LA Weekly noted how there were other parts of the song that serve as subtle insults to the city. He noted the Santa Ana winds in reality are very unpleasant, as the strong winds blow palm leaves and furniture around, and often bring hot dry weather. Pell believes the four streets listed at the end of the song were the four "must avoid" streets of 1983, due to gang violence and urban neglect. Pell ultimately described "I Love L.A." as a "paean to the moral weakness and intellectual vapidity" of Los Angeles. When journalist Timothy White asked whether or not "I Love L.A." was written as an insult to Los Angeles, Newman responded by saying he felt the lyrics were ambiguous. In a separate interview, Newman confessed an affection for his native city despite its imperfections: "There's some kind of ignorance L.A. has that I'm proud of. The open car and the redhead, the Beach Boys... that sounds really good to me."

== Release and reception ==
"I Love L.A." was released in 1983 as the lead single from Trouble in Paradise. At first, the single was considered a flop, as it failed to make the Billboard Hot 100, and was not distributed to retailers outside of the West Coast of the United States. The song did, however, reach #110 on Billboard's Bubbling Under chart during April 1983.

The music video for "I Love L.A." starred Newman and model Laura Howard (later to appear in the music videos for "It's Money That Matters" and "Falling in Love" from Newman's album Land of Dreams). After a brief prologue in black and white depicting the poverty of Dumbo, Brooklyn, Newman drives Howard in a red 1955 Buick Super convertible (borrowed from assistant director Robert Miller), down the streets described in the song, and passing by the Burrito King restaurant in Echo Park, Disneyland in Anaheim, the Melrose Avenue/Normandie Avenue exit on U.S. Route 101, Palisades Park in Santa Monica, and through Century City. Shots of Newman and Howard doing the tango at a rooftop party, Newman interacting with women on Venice Beach, and rapidly cut montages of the city's Art Deco architecture and restaurant façades are interspersed.

The following year, Los Angeles hosted the Summer Olympics, and the company Nike ran an ambush marketing campaign during the event. The campaign included a commercial featuring excerpts from the music video while Olympic athletes Mary Decker and Carl Lewis ran and jumped wearing Nike gear. The commercial played throughout the Olympics, and as a result, "I Love L.A." received worldwide exposure. It became one of the best-selling songs in Los Angeles, as citizens of Los Angeles saw the song as a celebration of their city.

When Newman was inducted into the Rock and Roll Hall of Fame in 2013, he performed the song alongside Tom Petty, John Fogerty and Jackson Browne.

== Credits and personnel ==
Credits adapted from the liner notes of Trouble in Paradise.

=== Musicians ===
- Randy Newman – vocals, piano, synthesizer, arranger
- Steve Lukather – lead guitar
- Larry Williams – saxophone
- David Paich – Fender Rhodes
- Michael Boddicker – synthesizers
- Nathan East – bass
- Jeff Porcaro – drums
- Christine McVie, Lindsey Buckingham – background vocals
- Waddy Wachtel – rhythm guitar

=== Production ===
- Russ Titelman, Lenny Waronker – producers
- Mark Linett – audio engineering
- Mark Linett – mixing
- Bobby Hata – mastering

== Covers and parodies ==
- In 1998, the rock group Jake Trout and the Flounders – consisting of professional golfers Payne Stewart, Peter Jacobsen and Larry Rinker – recorded a golf-themed parody of the song titled "I Love to Play", for their album of the same name.
- In 1985, Kris Kardashian (now Kris Jenner) covered the song with her own spin titled "I Love My Friends". Her daughters recreated the video for her 60th birthday in 2015.
- During the 1985–86 season, ABC used a version of the song for its image campaign, "You'll Love It!"
- In 1996, New Zealand pop group OMC covered the song as a follow up to their hit single "How Bizarre."
- In 2025, Dawes, John Legend, Sheryl Crow, Brad Paisley, Brittany Howard, and St. Vincent covered the song to open the 67th Annual Grammy Awards as a tribute for those affected by the 2025 Southern California wildfires. The next day, Dawes released a new studio recording of "I Love L.A," with the proceeds benefitting MusiCares.

== In popular culture ==
"I Love L.A." has been used in many feature films. The song was the first and the last music video aired on Cable Music Channel. The song was also used in some of the network's IDs and commercial promos.

The sequence of streets in the song was parodied in the 1985 song "Born in East L.A." by Cheech Marin. But instead of listing the streets sung by Randy Newman, listed are Soto Street, Brooklyn Avenue, City Terrace, and Whittier Boulevard, all streets of East Los Angeles. It was also parodied by Kris Jenner (then known as Kris Kardashian) for her thirtieth birthday in 1985, and it was remade by her daughters in 2015 for her sixtieth birthday.

The song is also played in the movies Down and Out in Beverly Hills, The Naked Gun: From the Files of Police Squad!, Bean and Volcano, and its lyrics play a plot point in the 1985 film Gotcha!. The song was used in the closing credits of CBS's coverage of the 2025 Grammy Awards. The song is featured in the TV show Perfect Strangers episode The Men Who Knew Too Much (Part 1) Balki sang this song when they were going to LA and then the song played at two different times in this episode.

=== Sports ===
"I Love L.A." is played following major sporting events in Los Angeles if the home team has scored or won, notably when the Dodgers, Lakers, Rams, Kings and Galaxy win. For a time, the Kings used it as their goal song. Newman also performed the song live at Staples Center just before the 2003 Lakers home opener as the team's 2001–02 championship banner, signaling their three-peat, was unveiled.

The Dodgers adapted the title to "We Love L.A." as a marketing slogan for the 2015 season, prompting Los Angeles Times writer Steve Dilbeck to quip, "It's not 'I Love L.A.' like in the song, but we love L.A. Guess they wanted to save paying royalties to Randy Newman."

In June 2014, as part of losing a bet with Los Angeles mayor Eric Garcetti on the Stanley Cup Final between the Kings and the New York Rangers, New York City mayor Bill de Blasio sang the song on Jimmy Kimmel Live!, wearing an "I Love L.A." T-shirt and accompanied by disadvantaged youth from the 52nd Street Project.

When Maroon 5 performed at the Forum – where the Lakers played from 1967 to 1999 – on March 5, 2015, band frontman Adam Levine brought out Newman to perform "I Love L.A." alongside as a special encore featuring an appearance from the Laker Girls, the team's cheerleaders.

Following the Dodgers' victory in the 2024 World Series, Nike created an ad featuring "I Love L.A." where the staff and players were listed out in a credits style, referencing the city's role in the film industry.

== See also ==
- "Theme from New York, New York" by Frank Sinatra
- "I Love New York"
- "Welcome to Atlanta"
- "Viva Las Vegas" by Elvis Presley
- "I Left My Heart in San Francisco" by Tony Bennett
- "Sweet Home Chicago"
- "Sweet Home Alabama"
