= Meet the Parents (soundtrack) =

Soundtrack album by Various artists
- Released: September 26, 2000
- Length: 39:23
- Label: DreamWorks Records
- Producer: Harold Battiste

Randy Newman chronology
Toy Story 2 (1999)	Meet the Parents (2000)	Monsters, Inc. (2001)

Professional ratings
Review scores
Source	Rating
Allmusic	3/5 stars
SoundtrackNet	4/5 stars

Meet the Parents is the soundtrack that accompanies the 2000 film Meet the Parents. The soundtrack album was released on September 26, 2000 on the DreamWorks Records label. "A Fool in Love", an original composition by Randy Newman featured on the album, was nominated for an Academy Award for Best Original Song at the 73rd Academy Awards which marked the 14th time that Newman's music was nominated for an Oscar. The same song also won the 16th Annual ASCAP Film & Television Music Award and was nominated at the Golden Satellite Awards 2000.

== Track listing ==
1. Randy Newman – "A Fool in Love" (2:16)
2. Randy Newman – "Poor Me" (1:34)
3. Randy Newman – "Got My Mojo Working" (1:58)
4. Randy Newman – "Give Me a Sign" (3:18)
5. Randy Newman – "Meet the Parents" (2:40)
6. Randy Newman – "Could You Milk Me?" (2:39)
7. Randy Newman – "Greg Loses Jinx" (1:48)
8. Randy Newman – "Burning Down the House" (1:56)
9. Randy Newman – "Wrong Cat" (1:05)
10. Randy Newman – "The Car Race" (2:48)
11. Randy Newman – "Broken Hearted" (1:16)
12. Randy Newman – "Pam's Problem" (1:50)
13. Randy Newman – "Jack to the Rescue" (1:05)
14. Randy Newman – "Together Again" (1:21)
15. Bobby Womack – "I'm Your Puppet" (3:32)
16. Lee Dorsey – "Ya Ya" (2:27)
17. Dr. John – "Big Chief" (3:25)
18. Randy Newman – "A Fool in Love" featuring Susanna Hoffs (2:27)

== Release history ==
Year	Format	Label	Catalog Number
2000	CD	DreamWorks	DRMD 450286
