= The Blues (Randy Newman song) =

1983 song by Randy Newman

Single by Randy Newman and Paul Simon

from the album Trouble in Paradise
- Released: 1983
- Studio: Warner Bros. Recording Studios, Hollywood
- Genre: Pop rock
- Length: 2:58
- Label: Warner Bros.
- Songwriter: Randy Newman
- Producers: Russ Titelman, Lenny Waronker

Randy Newman singles chronology
| "Rider in the Rain" (1978) | "The Blues" (1983) | "I Love L.A." (1983) |

Paul Simon singles chronology
| "Oh, Marion" (1981) | "The Blues" (1983) | "Allergies" (1983) |

"The Blues" is a song written by Randy Newman that appeared on his 1983 album Trouble in Paradise. It was also released as the lead single from the album and reached number 51 on the Billboard Hot 100. The song has been described as a parody on songs that 1970s singer-songwriters such as Paul Simon would sing, and Simon himself appears as a vocalist on the song.

== Lyrics and music ==
"The Blues" begins with Newman singing about a number of tragedies that have befallen someone who now has the blues. The tragedies include his mother burning up in a factory, his baby brother "selling his ass for a dollar bag", his uncle locked up in prison, and his best friend killed in a bar fight. In the chorus Newman sings that "He's got the blues, this boy/He's got the blues/You can hear it, you can hear it." In a later verse, Simon sings that as a kid he turned to the piano for consolation after his father ran away with a woman he met on a train. In the last verse Simon sings that "A year ago. I met a girl/I thought we'd hit a massive groove/But she dumped me/And all we'd hit were the blues."

Rolling Stone critic Christopher Connelly described the music of "The Blues" as having "as poppy a melody as Newman has written." Knight-Ridder writer Ken Tucker described it as a "mild, catchy tune." Batimore Sun critic J. D. Considine described it as "a cheery little pop song with an upbeat chorus and lots of pleasant harmony."

== Writing and recording ==
Producer Lenny Waronker said of the way Newman and Simon worked in the studio "They were both so intense. When Randy got stuck on a word, Paul offered a suggestion, and they are both such perfectionists that they went back and forth until they found the right word—and we're not talking about anything someone would notice; we're talking about an 'and' or 'but.'"

Although several critics felt that Newman intended to record "The Blues" with Simon because the song was intended a parody of Simon's songs, Newman denied that. According to Newman "I just played the song for him and he liked it. He's too good a musician to think of it that way and too serious a writer not to be able to laugh at himself." However, Newman did acknowledge that he wrote the song with Simon in mind, stating that "I thought it would be nice if he did the part of the sensitive songwriter. I think he is one of the best three or four songwriters in the world."

Newman later expressed regret about how the song made fun of a kid who had trouble and would rush to his room to play the piano. He said that "I kind of made fun of people who are hurt or sensitive and they go and find solace in music, because I never found any solace, for me it was always like certain work."

== Personnel ==
- Randy Newman – vocals
- Neil Larsen – piano solo
- Dean Parks – guitar solo
- Paulinho Da Costa – additional percussion
- Paul Simon – co-lead vocals

== Reception ==
Connelly described the song as gleefully "demolishing the bliss of unchecked egotism that characterizes, in many minds, the Seventies rock musician." Music critic Robert Hilburn said that the song "felt like a bookend to the days when Newman satirized the way folk and blues artists struck him as romanticizing their pain." Considine described it as a "wickedly accurate" parody of Simon, "in which Mr. Newman lampoons Mr. Simon's fondness for down-and-outers." Courier-News critic Steve Libowitz felt the song was playing a joke in having the singer invent "a troubled life to gain credibility as a blues singer." Libowitz noted that the snappy melody "is about as far from the blues as you can get."

New York Times critic John Rockwell was concerned that in the song Newman "assumes a snobbish disdain for weaker mortals" although Rockwell said that "one is left wondering how much he means us to smirk at snobs, how much he thinks we'll realize our own snobbishness, and how much he's actually lacerating himself for his own snobbishness, or even secretly wallowing in it." Newman biographer Kevin Courrier interpreted the song as switching gears from the songwriter who experiences the tragedies described in the first verse to a young fan in the verses that Simon sings, rather than the first verse being a third person description of the tragedies that befell the Simon character. Courrier criticized the song for making the boy's consolation of playing the piano into a burden, even though Courrier felt that "there's little doubt Newman identified with the kid."

The single reached number 51 on the Billboard Hot 100 and spent 8 weeks on the chart. It also reached number 36 on the Billboard Adult Contemporary chart.
