= Monsters, Inc. (soundtrack) =

Monsters, Inc. (An Original Walt Disney Records Soundtrack)

Soundtrack album by Randy Newman
- Released: October 23, 2001
- Recorded: 2000–2001
- Genre: Film score
- Length: 1:00:30
- Label: Walt Disney
- Producer: Randy Newman

Randy Newman chronology
Meet the Parents (2000)	Monsters, Inc. (2001)	Seabiscuit (2003)

Monsters, Inc. (An Original Walt Disney Records Soundtrack) is the soundtrack to the 2001 Disney/Pixar film of the same name. The original score is composed and conducted by Randy Newman, marking his fourth collaboration with Pixar following Toy Story (1995), A Bug's Life (1998), and Toy Story 2 (1999). Along with Newman's score, the album features an original song, "If I Didn't Have You," sung by John Goodman and Billy Crystal (voices of James P. Sullivan and Mike Wazowski, respectively). It was released on October 23, 2001, by Walt Disney Records.

The music received several nominations at prominent award ceremonies, including Academy, Grammy, and Annie award nominations."If I Didn't Have You" won Newman his first Academy Award for Best Original Song as well as a Grammy Award for Best Song Written for Visual Media.

== Background ==
Monsters, Inc. was Randy Newman's fourth feature film collaboration with Pixar, following Toy Story (1995), A Bug's Life (1998), and Toy Story 2 (1999). Newman worked closely with director Pete Docter and John Lasseter when crafting the film's music. The film's end credits feature an original song, "If I Didn't Have You," composed by Newman and sung by John Goodman and Billy Crystal (voices of James P. Sullivan and Mike Wazowski, respectively).

Presenting Mike and Sulley's characters musically, Newman used "corkier" themes as compared to those for Woody and Buzz from Toy Story. He used unusual instruments like the bass harmonica and bass accordion, as well as jazz, to represent their friendship. For the character Boo, Newman first wrote frightening music to express the way the monster world perceives her, while her other theme was played as a little girl going to sleep. The music in the "Scare Floor" sequence was meant to resemble 1940s jazz, much like the city scene in A Bug's Life. Newman drew influence from Nino Rota when writing music for the character Randall.

== Reception ==
AllMusic gave the album a three out of five star rating, saying: "As with both of the Toy Story movies and A Bug's Life, the soundtrack to Disney/Pixar's Monsters, Inc. features a fun, whimsical score by Randy Newman." Noting the retro feel of the album, they also added, "While this album probably won't appeal to most kids, it's nice that Disney acknowledges the huge adult following that Pixar's films have by releasing this playful, detailed score." Empire rated it three out of five stars and summarised: "Colourful, likeable, then, but hardly memorable." Filmtracks.com wrote: "The album for Monsters, Inc. is generous in its presentation of the score, with over 50 minutes of orchestral material available, and no modern pop songs to spoil the mix. Still, it's a disappointing product overall given Newman's lack of stylistic alteration in light of so many possibilities."

In a three out of five stars review Movie Wave stated: "Monsters, Inc. makes for generally a very entertaining and satisfying album, but despite all the comments above, Newman is at his best when scoring serious drama like Awakenings and Avalon and I hope that he manages to squeeze some of those in along with the inevitable Pixar projects to come his way over the coming years." Soundtrack.Net rated the soundtrack three and a half stars out of five and wrote: "It's nothing groundbreaking or unexpected—it's just high quality work from Randy Newman."

Far Out ranked it second in the best of Newman's scores (top ten): "Powered by a funky jazz soul, Randy Newman helps to bring the truly loveable world of Monsters, Inc. to life with a frenetic soundtrack that overflows with imagination, fun and excitement." In their top ten Musical scores from Pixar, MovieWeb ranked it second and wrote: "The lively, rhythmic swing of the movie's soundtrack has a contagious energy that forces you to move. The main theme for the movie is pure jazz with an insanely catchy brass section. Arguably, it's one of Newman's best works for a Pixar movie."

== Track listing ==
All tracks are written by Randy Newman.

No.	Title	Length
1.	"If I Didn't Have You" (performed by Billy Crystal and John Goodman)	3:41
2.	"Monsters, Inc."	2:09
3.	"School"	1:38
4.	"Walk to Work"	3:29
5.	"Sulley and Mike"	1:57
6.	"Randall Appears"	0:49
7.	"Enter the Heroes"	1:03
8.	"The Scare Floor"	2:41
9.	"Oh, Celia!"	1:09
10.	"Boo's Adventures in Monstropolis"	6:23
11.	"Boo's Tired"	1:03
12.	"Putting Boo Back"	2:22
13.	"Boo Escapes"	0:52
14.	"Celia's Mad"	1:41
15.	"Boo Is a Cube"	2:19
16.	"Mike's in Trouble"	2:19
17.	"The Scream Extractor"	2:12
18.	"Sulley Scares Boo"	1:10
19.	"Exile"	2:17
20.	"Randall's Attack"	2:22
21.	"The Ride of the Doors"	5:08
22.	"Waternoose is Waiting"	3:14
23.	"Boo's Going Home"	3:34
24.	"Kitty"	1:20
25.	"If I Didn't Have You" (performed by Newman)	3:38
Total length:		1:00:30

== Charts ==
Chart (2001)	Peak position
US Top Soundtracks (Billboard)	25

== Accolades ==
Awards
Year	Association	Award Category	Recipient (if any)	Result
2002	ASCAP Film and Television Music Awards	Top Box Office Films of 2002 Award	Randy Newman	Won
2002	Academy Awards	Best Original Score	Randy Newman	Nominated
2002	Academy Awards	Best Original Song (for "If I Didn't Have You")	Randy Newman	Won
2002	Motion Picture Sound Editors	Best Sound Editing in Animated Feature – Music	Bruno Coon	Nominated
2002	World Soundtrack Awards	Best Original Song Written for a Film (for "If I Didn't Have You")	Randy Newman, Billy Crystal and John Goodman	Won
2002	World Soundtrack Awards	Best Original Soundtrack of the Year - Orchestral	Randy Newman	Nominated
2002	World Soundtrack Awards	Soundtrack Composer of the Year	Randy Newman	Nominated
2003	Annie Awards	Outstanding Music in an Animated Feature Production	Randy Newman	Nominated
2003	Grammy Awards	Best Song Written for Visual Media (for "If I Didn't Have You")	Randy Newman	Won
2003	Grammy Awards	Best Score Soundtrack Album	Randy Newman	Nominated
