= Marriage Story (soundtrack) =

Film score by Randy Newman
- Released: November 15, 2019
- Recorded: 2019
- Studio: Newman Scoring Stage
- Genre: Film score
- Length: 58:15
- Label: Lakeshore
- Producer: Randy Newman

Randy Newman chronology
Toy Story 4 (2019)	Marriage Story (2019)	Toy Story 5 (2026)

Singles from Marriage Story
- 1. "What I Love About Nicole" Released: November 1, 2019

Marriage Story (Original Music from the Netflix film) is the score album to the 2019 film of the same name, directed by Noah Baumbach. The score is written and composed by Randy Newman, who previously worked with Baumbach on The Meyerowitz Stories (2017). Over 14 tracks were compiled into the album, which was recorded at the Newman Scoring Stage in 20th Century Fox Studios, with a 40-piece chamber orchestra, ranging from various instruments. Newman called the score as a "rush of cool water in a moviemaking era that rarely asks for things like lyricism, or instrumental solos".

The first track from the film "What I Love About Nicole" is the lead single from the album, released on November 1, 2019. Lakeshore Records marketed and released the soundtrack, digitally on November 15, and through CD on December 13. The score was positively received for Newman's composition, orchestration and diversity in the musical cues. For his score, Newman received nominations at various ceremonies including Academy Awards, Golden Globe and Satellite Awards, along with several other ceremonies hosted by critics' organisation.

== Composition ==
Randy Newman composed the film's score. While reading the script, Newman thought that he "sorted of the characters (Nicole and Charlie) as heroic in a way. And their love story — on one hand it's very human, the experience of the movie sort of mirrors qualities of real life. But also saw it in the tradition of great film love stories too, or these stories of 'love that can't be' for whatever reason, but still love that is worthy of celebration". The score started with the main themes of Charlie and Nicole, which was "an overture that introduces several thematic ideas for the characters".

"It's celebratory, it's compassionate, it's human. It's not romanticizing them, but it is loving, I think. The visuals that are accompanying it in the beginning are mostly images of domesticity, or coupledom, or individual characteristics that makes us unique. Ordinary moments. And I felt like the score could sort of celebrate it, make these ordinary moments extraordinary. Because they are, of course."

— Randy Newman

Newman used a 40-piece chamber orchestra that featured a wide range of instruments, including, two flutes, two oboes, two clarinets, two bassoons, three horns, a trumpet, a trombone, two percussions, 12 violins, four violas, four cellos, a bass, and a harp. The score was recorded at the Newman Scoring Stage during mid-2019, and was inspired by his uncle Alfred Newman's works from the 1950s and 1960s, devoid of modern classification. The cues featured dialogues from the characters, Nicole and Charlie. While scoring, Newman said in his interview to Variety, stating "I don't care so much if people don't notice the score and it really works. This one works, and they're noticing it. It's all right with me if it just helps the picture like those 'Toy Story' pictures and the score is not mentioned. It's not supposed to stick out. Yet in this one, I'm sticking out all over the place."

== Critical reception ==
James Southall of Movie Wave called it as a "beautiful, touching score for a film which frankly anybody who fancies a career as a film composer for something other than crash-bang movies would be very well advised to sit and study". Jonathan Broxton of Movie Music UK wrote "It's rare in 2019 that a composer is asked to channel the spirit of New Wave-era Georges Delerue, and even rarer when a composer does it with this much taste and dexterity. The themes are lovely, the arrangements are sublime, and at just a touch under 30 minutes in length is a perfect accompaniment to a petit déjeuner of café au lait, pain au chocolat, and maybe a Gauloises or two." Rosie Pentreath of Classic FM wrote "The score features sparsely accompanied melodies with lyric tunes, passed between different instruments of the orchestra. The tunes are light and airy one minute, flecked with gloomy uncertainty the next – the perfect auditory metaphor for the trials of an unsuitable marriage, and uncertainty of going through divorce."

Aparna Narain of The Hindu wrote "The poignant soundtrack by Randy Newman (also nominated for a Golden Globe) proves to be the perfect accompaniment to the story". Terri White of Empire said "the lightly sombre notes of Randy Newman's chamber orchestra score — beautifully and delicately sketches the tone of the entire film". Mark Kermode of The Guardian said "Randy Newman's contrapuntally romantic score ensures that our heartstrings are pulled in several directions at once".

== Track listing ==
No.	Title	Length
1.	"What I Love About Nicole"	3:25
2.	"What I Love About Charlie"	3:43
3.	"Last Critique"	1:41
4.	"Procession to the Trailer"	1:20
5.	"Nicole Tells Her Story"	1:01
6.	"Mommy Phase"	1:32
7.	"Trick or Treat"	1:19
8.	"New House"	1:32
9.	"Sockpants / Dirty Sockpants"	1:27
10.	"Shouting and Shopping"	1:40
11.	"Separate Lives"	1:12
12.	"What I Love About Charlie" (Reprise)	1:36
13.	"Sgt. Pepper Shoelaces"	1:07
14.	"End of Story" (Credits)	2:46
Total length:		24:57

== Additional music ==
The film featured singles from Tony K and Dua Lipa that are not included in the soundtrack. Adam Driver sings "Being Alive" from the musical Company written by Stephen Sondheim, in the film's conclusion, as Baumbach said "It's good because it's human. I wanted the song to have the same function songs do in musicals: the character arrives at another place by the end of the song. It's story and character. This material offered many hidden and not so hidden genres in it." Also from Company, Scarlett Johansson, Merritt Wever, and Julie Hagerty sing "You Can Drive a Person Crazy".

== Release history ==
Region	Date	Format(s)	Ref.
Various	November 15, 2019	Streaming; digital download	
Various	December 13, 2019	CD	
Various	February 21, 2020	Vinyl	

== Awards and nominations ==
Award	Date of the ceremony	Category	Nominee(s)	Result	Ref.
Academy Awards	February 9, 2020	Best Original Score	Randy Newman	Nominated	
Critics' Choice Movie Awards	January 12, 2020	Best Score	Randy Newman	Nominated	
Florida Film Critics Circle Awards	December 23, 2019	Best Original Score	Randy Newman	Nominated	
Golden Globe Awards	January 5, 2020	Best Original Score	Randy Newman	Nominated	
Hollywood Film Awards	November 3, 2019	Hollywood Film Composer Award	Randy Newman	Won	
Hollywood Music in Media Awards	November 20, 2019	Best Original Score in a Feature Film	Randy Newman	Nominated	
Hollywood Music in Media Awards	November 20, 2019	Best Music Supervision – Film	George Drakoulias	Nominated	
Online Film Critics Society	January 6, 2020	Best Original Score	Randy Newman	Nominated	
Satellite Awards	February 7, 2020	Best Original Score	Randy Newman	Nominated	
St. Louis Film Critics Association	December 15, 2019	Best Score	Randy Newman	Runner-up	
Washington D.C. Area Film Critics Association	December 8, 2019	Best Original Score	Randy Newman	Nominated	
