= Born Again (Randy Newman album) =

Studio album by Randy Newman
- Released: August 1979
- Recorded: 1979
- Studio: Warner Brothers (North Hollywood); A&M (Hollywood)
- Genre: Rock, avant-pop
- Length: 35:19
- Label: Warner Bros., Reprise
- Producer: Lenny Waronker, Russ Titelman

Randy Newman chronology
Little Criminals (1977)	Born Again (1979)	Trouble in Paradise (1983)

Born Again is the sixth studio album by American musician Randy Newman. The album was released in August 1979, to little sales and mixed reviews, which surprised Newman. Newman went on to say that Born Again was the strangest album that he had ever done. The album cover features Randy Newman in a business office, wearing face makeup (an obvious parody of Kiss), with dollar signs painted over his eyes, appearing to poke fun at the commercialization of rock music.

== Release and critical reception ==
Professional ratings
Review scores
Source	Rating
AllMusic	2.5/5 stars
Christgau's Record Guide	B+
MusicHound Rock: The Essential Album Guide	2.5/5 stars
The Rolling Stone Album Guide	3.5/5 stars

Newman expected the album to be a hit. Instead, the album sold relatively poorly, with worse reviews than its predecessor. Prior to its release, Newman called Born Again "a larger insult" than his 1977 hit single "Short People", but following the record's disappointing reception, he later reflected, "The mistake I made was that to do this, people have to know who you are in the first place." "It's a weird album full of peculiar songs like the one about an ELO fan getting everything wrong. It's very idiosyncratic, with small subjects. If it had been a hit to follow it might have been different but I have always written the same way." Ironically, Jeff Lynne would later be among the producers of Land of Dreams.

Stephen Holden, writing for Rolling Stone, criticized the album for its "snide" and "nihilistic" tone. The Globe and Mail wrote that "Newman's knife gets a little sharper every time—he's tired of double and triple meanings and he intends to peg things clearly on one level—without co-opting the humane character of his enterprise." The New York Times concluded that "there's a tinge of anger in Mr. Newman that, curiously enough, precludes his songs from seeming like cheap shots."

== Track listing ==
All tracks written and arranged by Randy Newman.

1. "It's Money That I Love" – 3:38
2. "The Story of a Rock and Roll Band" – 2:53
3. "Pretty Boy" – 4:00
4. "Mr. Sheep" – 3:53
5. "Ghosts" – 2:28
6. "They Just Got Married" – 2:51
7. "Spies" – 3:55
8. "The Girls in My Life (Part One)" – 2:36
9. "Half a Man" – 3:38
10. "William Brown" – 1:50
11. "Pants" – 3:06

== Charts ==
Chart (1979)	Position
United States (Billboard 200)	41
Australia (Kent Music Report)	65
Canada (RPM)	81

== Personnel ==
- Randy Newman – vocals, piano, Fender Rhodes
- Buzz Feiten, Waddy Wachtel – guitar
- Chuck Findley, Tom Scott – horns
- Victor Feldman – piano, Fender Rhodes, drums, percussion
- Michael Boddicker – synthesizer
- David Shields, Willie Weeks – bass guitar
- Andy Newmark – drums
- Lenny Castro, Carlos Vega – percussion
- Stephen Bishop – background vocals
- Valerie Carter – background vocals
- Arno Lucas – background vocals

Technical

- Tom Knox – engineer
- Lee Herschberg – mixing
- Mike Salisbury – art direction, cover design
- Mark Feldman – cover photography
