= Toy Story (soundtrack) =

Toy Story: An Original Walt Disney Records Soundtrack

Soundtrack album by Randy Newman
- Released: November 22, 1995
- Recorded: 1994–1995
- Studios: Sony Pictures Studios; Conway Recording Studios; Ocean Way Recording
- Genres: Film score; soundtrack
- Length: 51:44
- Label: Walt Disney
- Producers: Chris Montan; Frank Wolf; Don Davis; Jim Flamberg; Randy Newman

Randy Newman chronology
Maverick (Original Motion Picture Soundtrack) (1994)	Toy Story: An Original Walt Disney Records Soundtrack (1995)	James and the Giant Peach (Original Motion Picture Soundtrack) (1996)

Singles from Toy Story (Original Motion Picture Soundtrack)
- 1. "You've Got a Friend in Me" Released: April 12, 1996

Professional ratings
Review scores
Source	Rating
AllMusic	4.5/5 stars
Filmtracks	3/5 stars
Movie Wave	4/5 stars

Toy Story is the soundtrack album for the 1995 Disney/Pixar animated film Toy Story, with music composed, conducted, orchestrated, arranged, and performed by Randy Newman. The soundtrack includes the film score, as well as three original songs written and performed by Newman. It was released by Walt Disney Records on November 22, 1995, the week of the film's release, and the first soundtrack album from a Pixar film.

The soundtrack for Toy Story received praise for its "sprightly, stirring score". It received Academy Award nominations for Best Original Score and Best Original Song ("You've Got a Friend in Me"). Despite the film's critical success, the soundtrack peaked at number 94 on the Billboard 200. A cassette and CD single release of "You've Got a Friend in Me" was released on April 12, 1996, to promote the soundtrack's release.

After it went out of print, the album was made available for purchase digitally in retailers such as iTunes. The soundtrack, along with Newman's complete unreleased score for the film was remastered and reissued on July 17, 2015, as the tenth entry of The Legacy Collection series.

== Track listing ==
All tracks are written by Randy Newman.

Toy Story (Original Motion Picture Soundtrack) track listing
No.	Title	Performer(s)	Length
1.	"You've Got a Friend in Me"	Randy Newman	2:04
2.	"Strange Things"	Newman	3:18
3.	"I Will Go Sailing No More"	Newman	2:57
4.	"Andy's Birthday"	Newman	5:58
5.	"Soldier's Mission"	Newman	1:29
6.	"Presents"	Newman	1:09
7.	"Buzz"	Newman	1:40
8.	"Sid"	Newman	1:21
9.	"Woody and Buzz"	Newman	4:29
10.	"Mutants"	Newman	6:05
11.	"Woody's Gone"	Newman	2:13
12.	"The Big One"	Newman	2:51
13.	"Hang Together"	Newman	6:02
14.	"On the Move"	Newman	6:18
15.	"Infinity and Beyond"	Newman	3:09
16.	"You've Got a Friend in Me" (Duet Version)	Newman; Lyle Lovett	2:42
Total length:			51:44

=== Walt Disney Records the Legacy Collection ===
Disc 1
No.	Title	Performer(s)	Length
1.	"Opening"		1:28
2.	"You've Got a Friend in Me"		2:04
3.	"Andy's Birthday Is Today"		0:42
4.	"They're Alive!"		1:12
5.	"'Staff Meeting Everybody!'"		0:43
6.	"'You Too, Bo Peep'"		0:39
7.	"Andy's Birthday Party"		1:33
8.	"Code Red"		1:30
9.	"A Good Soldier Never Leaves a Man Behind"		0:37
10.	"Presents: Who Invited That Kid?"		1:19
11.	"Surprise Present"		1:09
12.	"'What Are You Doing Under the Bed?'"		0:22
13.	"Buzz Revealed"		1:07
14.	"Buzz Flies"		0:44
15.	"Strange Things"		3:25
16.	"Woody/Bo Peep"		0:20
17.	"Sid"		1:22
18.	"Virtual Realty"		0:17
19.	"Woody Plots"		0:58
20.	"Rube Globeburg"		0:25
21.	"'Woody Did It!'"		1:07
22.	"Rescue Attempt"		1:11
23.	"'Buzz, You're Alive!'"		0:32
24.	"Buzz and Woody Fight"		0:35
25.	"Buzz's Mission"		0:19
26.	"'It's a Spaceship, Buzz'"		0:58
27.	"Pizza Planet Rock"		0:37
28.	"'What? Hello? A Space Port!'"		1:28
29.	"The Claw"		2:18
30.	"Dr. Sid"		1:09
31.	"Mutant Toys"		1:12
32.	"Woody's Gone"		0:52
33.	"'Sorry Guys, Dinner's Canceled'"		0:53
34.	"Scud"		0:45
35.	"Buzz Lightyear Commercial"		0:54
36.	"I Will Go Sailing No More"		3:02
37.	"Out the Window"		0:45
38.	"Sid's Toys Fix Buzz"		1:29
39.	"The Big One"		1:23
40.	"Sad Andy"		0:47
41.	"'Buzz, I Need Your Help'"		2:16
42.	"Working Together (Leads to Failure)"		0:45
43.	"The Rescue Pt. 1"		3:41
44.	"Sid Counts Down"		1:09
45.	"The Rescue Pt. 2: Play Nice, Sid"		1:30
46.	"Chasing the Van"		1:42
47.	"RC to the Rescue"		2:28
48.	"To Infinity and Beyond"		2:12
49.	"Together Again and a Very Merry Christmas"		1:47
50.	"You've Got a Friend in Me"	Randy Newman and Lyle Lovett	2:40
51.	"End Credits"		2:21
Total length:			1:07:04

Disc 2
No.	Title	Performer(s)	Length
1.	"Strange Things (Piano/Vocal Demo)"		3:00
2.	"Plastic Spaceman (Piano/Vocal Demo)"		3:20
3.	"I Will Go Sailing No More (Piano/Vocal Demo)"		3:37
4.	"The Fool (Piano/Vocal/Background Vocal Demo)"		2:08
5.	"You've Got a Friend in Me (Instrumental)"		2:06
6.	"Strange Things (Instrumental)"		3:19
7.	"I Will Go Sailing No More (Instrumental)"		2:57
8.	"Thanking the Orchestra"	Randy Newman and John Lasseter	0:41
Total length:			21:11

== Personnel ==
=== Musicians ===
- Randy Newman – piano (1, 2, 3, 16), orchestral arrangements (1–3), brass arrangements (1–3)
- Randy Kerber – keyboards (1, 2, 3, 16)
- Kevin Savigar – Electric Organ / Hammond B-3 (16)
- John Goux, Dean Parks – guitars (1)
- Jimmy Johnson - bass guitar
- Jim Keltner – drums, percussion
- Yvonne Williams, Bobbi Page, Luana Jackman – background vocals (1, 2, 3, 16)
- Lyle Lovett – co-lead vocals (16)
- Gabe Witcher – violin (16)

=== Production ===
- Randy Newman – producer
- Ted Kryczko, Joey Miskulin and Gary Powell – producer (1)
- Don Davis, Frank Wolf, Jim Flamberg, Chris Montan – producer (2–15)
- Don Was – producer (16)
- Brian Rajaratnam, John Costello, Michael Fahey, Monique Evelyn, Sean Badum – studio personnel, assistant recording engineer (1)
- Andrew Page – music producer (1)
- Jeff De Morris – assistant engineer (16)
- Rik Pekkonen – recording and mixing engineer (16)

== Charts ==
Chart (1995)	Peak position
U.S. Billboard 200	94

Chart (2010)	Peak position
UK Soundtrack Albums (Official Charts)	48

Chart (2025)	Peak position
US Kid Albums (Billboard)	13
