= Trouble in Paradise (Randy Newman album) =

Studio album by Randy Newman
- Released: January 17, 1983
- Recorded: 1982
- Studios: Warner Bros. Recording (North Hollywood); The Burbank Studios (Burbank)
- Length: 39:36
- Label: Warner Bros.
- Producers: Russ Titelman, Lenny Waronker

Randy Newman chronology
Born Again (1979)	Trouble in Paradise (1983)	Land of Dreams (1988)

Trouble in Paradise is the seventh studio album by the American musician Randy Newman, released in 1983. It includes "I Love L.A." and the first single, "The Blues", a duet with Paul Simon. "Same Girl" is about a woman addicted to heroin. Newman supported the album playing shows with the Roches.

A cover version of "Real Emotional Girl" by the Canadian singer Patricia O'Callaghan appears on her studio album Real Emotional Girl (2001).

== Critical reception ==
Professional ratings
Review scores
Source	Rating
AllMusic	4.5/5 stars
Robert Christgau	A−
Rolling Stone	4/5 stars

The New York Times wrote: "Newman inhabits his characters so completely that he makes us uneasy, wondering how much self-identification he has invested in their creation. His work achieves its power by that very confusion." The Globe and Mail noted that "Newman still has not the least desire to play it safe: he is still tossing up the great American contradictions—the seductiveness of racism and the paranoia of sex—like a circus performer juggling machetes, with the same appalling, exhilarating effect."

The Miami Herald determined that most of the songs "defy humming... A couple are essentially free verse set to music." The Christian Science Monitor determined that "the polished sound of the album makes it his most commercial effort, yet he has kept his humor and wit alive."

The album placed 13th in the 1983 Pazz & Jop Critics Poll, and it was ranked as number 67 on Rolling Stone's 100 Greatest Albums of the 80s list.

== Track listing ==
All songs written by Randy Newman.

Side 1

1. "I Love L.A." – 3:29
2. "Christmas in Capetown" – 4:21
3. "The Blues" – 3:01
4. "Same Girl" – 2:53
5. "Mikey's" – 2:10
6. "My Life Is Good" – 4:38

Side 2

1. "Miami" – 4:04
2. "Real Emotional Girl" – 2:28
3. "Take Me Back" – 4:09
4. "There's a Party at My House" – 2:50
5. "I'm Different" – 2:33
6. "Song for the Dead" – 3:00

== Personnel ==
Musicians

- Randy Newman – vocals, piano, synthesizers, arrangements, conductor
- Michael Boddicker – synthesizers, piano (5), organ (7)
- David Paich – Fender Rhodes, Farfisa organ (9), backing vocals (1)
- Steve Lukather – guitar, backing vocals (1)
- Nathan East – bass, backing vocals (1)
- Jeff Porcaro – drums, backing vocals (1)
- Lenny Castro – percussion, backing vocals (1)

Additional musicians

- Neil Larsen – piano solo (3)
- Ralph Grierson – piano (4, 8)
- Waddy Wachtel – rhythm guitar (1)
- Dean Parks – guitar solo (3), mandolin (7), guitar (11)
- Paulinho Da Costa – additional percussion (2, 3, 9)
- Larry Williams – saxophone (1, 9)
- Jim Horn – saxophone (5, 10)
- Jon Smith – saxophone (5, 10)
- Ernie Watts – saxophone solo (6), saxophone (9)
- Steve Madaio – trumpet (9)
- Jerry Hey – trumpet (10)
- Russ Titelman – backing vocals (1)
- Lenny Waronker – backing vocals (1)
- Christine McVie – backing vocals (1)
- Lindsey Buckingham – backing vocals (1)
- Don Henley – backing vocals (2, 9)
- Bob Seger – backing vocals (2, 9)
- Linda Ronstadt – backing vocals (2, 11)
- Wendy Waldman – backing vocals (2, 11)
- Jennifer Warnes – backing vocals (2, 11)
- Paul Simon – co-lead vocals (3)
- Rickie Lee Jones – backing vocals (7)
- Arno Lucas – backing vocals (7)
- Leslie Smith – backing vocals (7)

Technical

- Produced by Russ Titelman and Lenny Waronker
- Engineered by Mark Linett (1–3, 5–7, 9–12), and Lee Herschberg (4, 8)
- Assistant engineer – Bob Fernandez
- Mixed by Mark Linett
- Mastered by Bobby Hata at Warner Bros. Recording Studios (North Hollywood, CA)
- Production coordinators – Gail Pierson, Vicki Fortson, and Kimberly Boyle
- Photography – Tim Newman
- Art direction and cover design – Jim Swan
