= Land of Dreams (Randy Newman album) =

Studio album by Randy Newman
- Released: September 20, 1988
- Genre: Rock
- Length: 40:18
- Label: Reprise
- Producer: James Newton Howard, Jeff Lynne, Mark Knopfler, Tommy LiPuma

Randy Newman chronology
Trouble in Paradise (1983)	Land of Dreams (1988)	Randy Newman's Faust (1995)

Professional ratings
Review scores
Source	Rating
AllMusic	4/5 stars
Robert Christgau	B+
Rolling Stone	4/5 stars

Land of Dreams is the eighth studio album by American musician Randy Newman. Released in 1988, the album features vignettes of his childhood in New Orleans. The title refers to a nickname for New Orleans in the Dixieland standard "Basin Street Blues", quoted in the opening track, "Dixie Flyer".

Two music videos filmed to support the album, for "It's Money That Matters" and "Falling in Love", feature Newman and model Laura Howard, and serve as prequel and sequel to the video for "I Love L.A.".

== Reception ==
It placed 10th in the 1988 Pazz & Jop Critics Poll. "Whether or not ['Dixie Flyer' and 'New Orleans'] are simple autobiography, they're presented as such," wrote Greil Marcus, "and for a man who's always sung as a character actor, it's a shock". While "Dixie Flyer" was the name of the train line mentioned in the lyrics, "Dixie" was also the nickname of Adele "Dixie" Fuchs/Fox, Randy Newman's mother, who, as the song describes, came from a southern Jewish family.

== Chart performance ==
The album's single "It's Money That Matters" rose to the top of the Mainstream Rock chart for two weeks (and peaked at No. 60 on the Hot 100), to become Newman's only number one hit on any U.S. chart; it features Mark Knopfler on guitar. Prior to the album's release, the song "Something Special" was closing title music for the 1987 MGM production Overboard starring Goldie Hawn and Kurt Russell and was also featured in the trailer of the film Awakenings, for which Newman also wrote the music, and the piano bridge from the song "Dixie Flyer" would subsequently often be utilized as break or filler music, most notably on the Car Talk radio program. The song "Falling in Love" features in the credits to the 1989 Tom Selleck film Her Alibi and was used as the opening theme of the short-lived 1990 ABC sitcom, The Marshall Chronicles.

== Track listing ==
All songs written by Randy Newman.

1. "Dixie Flyer" – 4:10
2. "New Orleans Wins the War" – 3:27
3. "Four Eyes" – 3:34
4. "Falling in Love" – 3:00
5. "Something Special" – 3:07
6. "Bad News from Home" – 2:45
7. "Roll with the Punches" – 3:29
8. "Masterman and Baby J" – 3:27
9. "Red Bandana" – 2:35
10. "Follow the Flag" – 2:15
11. "It's Money That Matters" – 4:04
12. "I Want You to Hurt Like I Do" – 4:07

== Personnel ==
- Randy Newman – piano, vocals, arranger, conductor
- Mark Knopfler – guitar & background vocals on Dixie Flyer
- Tom Petty – guitar, background vocals
- Mike Campbell, Buzz Feiten, Michael Landau, Steve Lukather, Dean Parks – guitar
- Nathan East, Lee Sklar, Neil Stubenhaus – bass guitar
- Jeff Lynne – keyboards, background vocals
- James Newton Howard – synthesizer, keyboards
- Michael Boddicker, Larry Fast, Guy Fletcher, David Paich, Robbie Weaver – synthesizer
- Kevin Maloney – synthesizer, background vocals
- Phil Jones – drums and percussion on 'Falling in Love'
- Jeff Porcaro, John Robinson, Carlos Vega – drums
- Lenny Castro – percussion
- Bill Reichenbach Jr. – trombone
- Marc Russo – saxophone
- Dan Higgins – flute, tenor saxophone
- Jerry Hey – trumpet, flugelhorn
- Twila Rice, Bob Hilburn Jr., Nicole Jones, Karen Verkoelen, Jeannie Novak, Adrienne Howell, Dana Drum, Deborah Neal – background vocals

== Charts ==
Chart performance for Land of Dreams
Chart (1988)	Peak position
Swiss Albums (Schweizer Hitparade)	12
US Billboard 200	88
