= You've Got a Friend in Me =

1996 single by Randy Newman

- Cover for the duet version

Single by Randy Newman and Lyle Lovett

from the album Toy Story (Original Motion Picture Soundtrack)
- Released: April 12, 1996
- Recorded: 1995
- Genre: Country; pop
- Length: 2:04; 2:42 (duet version)
- Label: Walt Disney
- Songwriter: Randy Newman
- Producers: Randy Newman; Don Was (duet version)

Randy Newman singles chronology
"It's Money That Matters" / "Falling in Love" (1988)	"You've Got a Friend in Me" (1996)	"A Few Words in Defense of Our Country" (2007)

Lyle Lovett singles chronology
"The Road to Ensenada" (1996)	"You've Got a Friend in Me" (1996)	"Private Conversation" (1997)

"You've Got a Friend in Me" is a song by Randy Newman. Used as the main theme song for the Disney/Pixar animated film Toy Story (1995), it has since become a major musical component for its sequels, Toy Story 2 (1999), Toy Story 3 (2010), Toy Story 4 (2019), and a part of Toy Story 5 (2026), as well as a musical leitmotif throughout the Toy Story franchise. The song was nominated for both the Academy Award for Best Original Song and the Golden Globe Award for Best Original Song.

Like many other Disney theme songs, "You've Got a Friend in Me" has been covered numerous times. Cover versions featured in the first three Toy Story films include a duet with Newman and country singer Lyle Lovett in Toy Story; a diegetic instance by Tom Hanks, a version by Robert Goulet, and an instrumental by saxophonist Tom Scott in Toy Story 2; and a Spanish-language version by the Gipsy Kings in Toy Story 3. "You've Got a Friend in Me" was used in the trailer for Toy Story 5 and appeared briefly during the film, but did not appear in the credits, which instead featured "I Knew It, I Knew You" by Taylor Swift.

== In Toy Story ==
The song is played during the opening credits for Toy Story, Toy Story 3, and Toy Story 4, establishing the importance of Woody and Andy in the first film and the importance of all his toys in the third and fourth. Toy Story 3 also uses it for irony and dramatic effect, as the opening credits hark back to the first film and the song abruptly fades out with "And as the years go by, our friendship will never die", before showing that Andy's remaining toys in the present day are boxed up and unused. When they were unused, Andy was 17 years old. In Toy Story 4, the song is heard during the opening montage, that features Andy playing with Woody, giving him to Bonnie as a teenager, and Bonnie playing with him, but soon starting to neglect him.

In two sequels, the song is listened to by the characters as part of the story, as cover versions done at the end of the film for thematic reasons: at the end of Toy Story 2, the character Wheezy starts to sing it to the other toys in the style of Frank Sinatra; during the end credits of Toy Story 3, Buzz Lightyear and Jessie perform a pasodoble to a Spanish version of the song, deliberately played by Jessie to get Buzz to dance.

In the third act of Toy Story 2, an episode of Woody's Roundup (the fictional 1950s puppet show he was based on) shows the puppet Woody singing the song, directed at the young audience and featuring a small child hugging the puppet. Woody sees this and has an epiphany, realizing that his mission as a toy is to be there for a child.

The Woody's Roundup version was performed by Tom Hanks, with acoustic guitar backing; Wheezy's version was sung by Robert Goulet (though the character was voiced by Joe Ranft); and the Spanish version, "You've Got a Friend in Me (Para el Buzz Español)", was performed by the Gipsy Kings.

== Personnel ==
=== Original version ===
- Randy Newman – lead vocals, piano, orchestral arrangements
- Lyle Lovett – co-lead vocals
- Randy Kerber – keyboards
- John Goux, Dean Parks – guitars
- Jimmy Johnson – bass
- Jim Keltner – drums
- Yvonne Williams, Bobbi Page, Luana Jackman – background vocals

=== Duet version ===
- Randy Newman – lead vocals, piano
- Lyle Lovett – co-lead vocals
- Kevin Savigar – Hammond B-3
- Mark Goldenberg – guitar
- James Hutchinson – bass
- Jim Keltner – drums
- Gabe Witcher – violin

== Chart performance ==
Chart (1996)	Peak position
Canadian RPM Adult Contemporary	40

=== Certifications ===
Region	Certification	Certified units/sales
New Zealand (RMNZ)	Platinum	30,000^{‡}
United Kingdom (BPI)	Platinum	600,000^{‡}
United States (RIAA)	3× Platinum	3,000,000^{‡}
^{‡} Sales+streaming figures based on certification alone.

== Release history ==
Format	Release date	Catalog
Cassette	April 12, 1996	#60367
CD	April 12, 1996	#60367

== Covers & remixes ==
The Canadian singer Michael Bublé covered "You've Got a Friend in Me" on his 2013 album To Be Loved. The track became a U.S. Adult Contemporary chart hit, spending 14 weeks on the chart and peaking at number 10.

On September 23rd, 2019, American indie game developer and composer Toby Fox posted to Tumblr a remix of the original cover, titled "Friend Inside Me", which contained horror-thematic orchestration and sentence-mixed lyrics solely consisting of the phrase "friend inside me". The remix gained popularity as an internet meme and inside joke among fans of Fox's episodic video game Deltarune, with some fans making speculations of relevancy or inclusion of easter eggs referencing "Friend Inside Me" in future chapters. In February 2026, Fox quote tweeted a Toy Story 5 trailer while feigning involvement in the film as an acknowledgement of "Friend Inside Me"'s popularity.
