= Toy Story (franchise) =

Disney media franchise created by Pixar

- Flat logo used since 1995
- Created by: John Lasseter; Pete Docter; Andrew Stanton; Joe Ranft
- Developed by: Joss Whedon Andrew Stanton Joel Cohen Alec Sokolow
- Original work: Toy Story (1995)
- Owners: Pixar Animation Studios (The Walt Disney Company)
- Years: 1995–present

Print publications
- Comics: List of comics

Films and television
- Films: Main series: Toy Story (1995); Toy Story 2 (1999); Toy Story 3 (2010); Toy Story 4 (2019); Toy Story 5 (2026); Spin-off(s): Lightyear (2022)
- Short films: Lamp Life (2020); Toy Story Back-to-School Lunchbox Disaster (2026)
- Animated series: Buzz Lightyear of Star Command (2000–01); Toy Story Toons (2011-12); Forky Asks a Question (2019–20); Pixar Popcorn (2021)
- Television specials: Toy Story of Terror! (2013); Toy Story That Time Forgot (2014)
- Direct-to-video: Buzz Lightyear of Star Command: The Adventure Begins (2000)

Theatrical presentations
- Plays: Disney on Ice: Toy Story; Disney on Ice: Toy Story 2; Disney on Ice: Toy Story 3
- Musical: Toy Story: The Musical (2008–16)

Games
- Video games: List of video games

Audio
- Soundtracks: Toy Story (1995); Toy Story 2 (1999); Toy Story 3 (2010); Toy Story 4 (2019); Lightyear (2022); Toy Story 5 (2026)

Miscellaneous
- Toy: Lego Toy Story
- Theme park attractions: Buzz Lightyear's Space Ranger Spin (1998–present); Buzz Lightyear's Astro Blasters (2005–present) (Note: A ride with a similar name was at DisneyQuest, but it closed in 2018.); Toy Story Midway Mania! (2008–present); Toy Story Land (2010–present) (Note: Year runs in particular for this themed land: 2010–present in Disneyland Paris (as Toy Story Playland); 2011–present in Hong Kong Disneyland; 2018–present in Disney's Hollywood Studios and Shanghai Disneyland); Jessie's Critter Carousel (2019–present)

Toy Story is an American media franchise created by Pixar Animation Studios and owned by The Walt Disney Company. It centers on toys that, unknown to humans, are secretly living. It began in 1995 with the release of the animated feature film of the same name, which focuses on a diverse group of toys featuring a classic cowboy doll named Sheriff Woody and a modern spaceman action figure named Buzz Lightyear.

The Toy Story franchise consists mainly of seven animated feature films: Toy Story (1995), Toy Story 2 (1999), Toy Story 3 (2010), Toy Story 4 (2019), Toy Story 5 (2026) and the spin-off film within a film Lightyear (2022). It also includes the 2D-animated direct-to-video spin-off film within a film Buzz Lightyear of Star Command: The Adventure Begins (2000) and the animated television series Buzz Lightyear of Star Command (2000–01) which followed the film. The first Toy Story was the first feature-length film to be made entirely using computer-generated imagery. The first two films were directed by John Lasseter, the third film by Lee Unkrich (who acted as co-director of the second film alongside Ash Brannon), the fourth film by Josh Cooley, the fifth film by Andrew Stanton (who co-wrote all five films) and Lightyear by Angus MacLane.

Produced on a total budget of $770 million, the Toy Story films have grossed $4.2 billion worldwide, becoming the 18th highest-grossing film franchise worldwide, the second highest-grossing animated franchise, and one of the highest-grossing media franchises of all time. Each film of the main series set box office records, with the third and fourth included in the top 50 all-time worldwide films. The franchise has received acclaim from critics and audiences. The first two films were re-released in theaters as a Disney Digital 3-D "double feature" for at least two weeks in October 2009 as a promotion for the then-upcoming third film.

== Films ==
Film	Release date	Director	Screenplay by	Story by	Producer(s)	Composer
Main series
Toy Story	November 22, 1995	John Lasseter	Joss Whedon, Andrew Stanton, Joel Cohen & Alec Sokolow	John Lasseter, Pete Docter, Andrew Stanton & Joe Ranft	Bonnie Arnold & Ralph Guggenheim	Randy Newman
Toy Story 2	November 24, 1999	John Lasseter	Andrew Stanton, Rita Hsiao, Doug Chamberlin & Chris Webb	John Lasseter, Pete Docter, Ash Brannon & Andrew Stanton	Helene Plotkin & Karen Robert Jackson	Randy Newman
Toy Story 3	June 18, 2010	Lee Unkrich	Michael Arndt	John Lasseter, Andrew Stanton & Lee Unkrich	Darla K. Anderson	Randy Newman
Toy Story 4	June 21, 2019	Josh Cooley	Andrew Stanton & Stephany Folsom	John Lasseter, Andrew Stanton, Josh Cooley, Valerie LaPointe, Rashida Jones, Will McCormack, Martin Hynes & Stephany Folsom	Mark Nielsen, Jonas Rivera & Galyn Susman (Note: Although she is credited under "producer" in the end crawl for the film, she is not credited alongside Nielsen or Rivera in the "produced by" credit.)	Randy Newman
Toy Story 5	June 19, 2026	Andrew Stanton	Andrew Stanton & Kenna Harris	Andrew Stanton	Lindsey Collins & Jessica Choi (Note: Choi is given a "producer" credit in the end crawl for the film, before the Cast credits. Lindsey Collins retains sole "produced by" credit in the film marketing material.)	Randy Newman
Spin-offs
Lightyear	June 17, 2022	Angus MacLane	Angus MacLane & Jason Headley	Angus MacLane, Jason Headley & Matthew Aldrich	Galyn Susman	Michael Giacchino

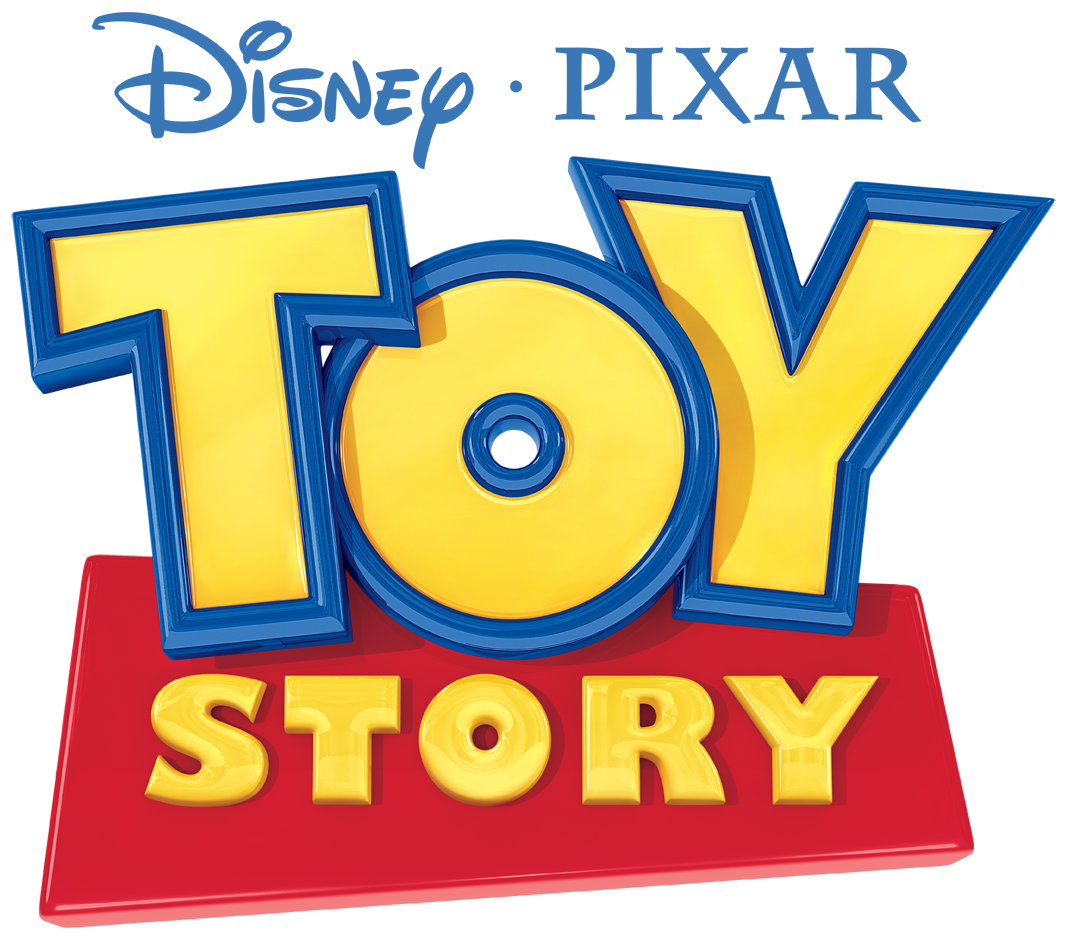
Glossy logo used since the teaser trailer for Toy Story 3 on May 29, 2009, concurrently being used with the original flat logo.

=== Toy Story (1995) ===
Toy Story, the first film in the franchise, was released on November 22, 1995. It was the first feature-length film created entirely by computer-generated imagery (CGI) and was directed by John Lasseter. The plot of the film involves Andy Davis (voiced by John Morris), an imaginative young boy, getting a new Buzz Lightyear (voiced by Tim Allen) action figure for his birthday, causing Sheriff Woody (voiced by Tom Hanks), a vintage cowboy doll, to think that he has been replaced as Andy's favorite toy. In competing for Andy's attention, Woody accidentally knocks Buzz out of a window, leading the other toys to believe he tried to murder Buzz. Determined to set things right, Woody tries to save Buzz and both must escape from the house of the next-door neighbor Sid Phillips (voiced by Erik von Detten), who likes to torture and destroy toys. In addition to Hanks and Allen, the film featured the voices of Jim Varney, Don Rickles, John Ratzenberger, Wallace Shawn, and Annie Potts. The film was critically and financially successful, grossing over $373 million worldwide. The film was later re-released in Disney Digital 3-D as part of a double feature, along with Toy Story 2, for a two-week run, which was later extended due to its financial success. The film was re-released in theaters again on September 12, 2025, for its 30th anniversary.

=== Toy Story 2 (1999) ===
Toy Story 2, the second film in the franchise, was released on November 24, 1999. Lasseter reprised his role as director. The film's plot involves Woody getting stolen by a greedy toy collector who is named Al McWhiggin (voiced by Wayne Knight). Buzz and several of Andy's toys set off to attempt to rescue Woody, who meanwhile has discovered his origins as a historic television star. In addition to the returning cast, Toy Story 2 included voice acting from Joan Cusack, Kelsey Grammer, Estelle Harris, and Jodi Benson. Toy Story 2 was not originally intended for release in theaters, but as a direct-to-video sequel to the first Toy Story, with a 60-minute running time. Disney's executives, however, were impressed by the high quality of the in-work imagery for the sequel, and were also pressured by the main characters' voice actors Hanks and Allen, so they decided to convert Toy Story 2 into a theatrical film. It turned out to be an even greater success than the first Toy Story, grossing over $497 million worldwide. The film was re-released in Disney Digital 3-D as part of a double feature, along with the first Toy Story, on October 2, 2009.

=== Toy Story 3 (2010) ===
Toy Story 3, the third film in the franchise, was released on June 18, 2010, nearly 11 years after Toy Story 2. The plot focuses on the toys being accidentally dropped off at Sunnyside, a daycare center while their owner, Andy, is getting ready to go to college. The toys discover that all of the toys at Sunnyside Daycare are ruled by Lotso (voiced by Ned Beatty), a sinister teddy bear, while Woody finds potential hope for a new home in the hands of Bonnie, a toddler from the daycare that takes great care of her toys. Blake Clark replaced Jim Varney following his death in 2000, while other new cast members included Michael Keaton, Timothy Dalton, Jeff Garlin, Kristen Schaal, and Bonnie Hunt. It was the first Toy Story film not to be directed by Lasseter (although he remained involved in the film as executive producer), but by Lee Unkrich, who edited the first two films and co-directed the second. It was Pixar's highest-grossing film of all time both domestically, surpassing Finding Nemo, until it was surpassed by Finding Dory in 2016 and worldwide, also surpassing Finding Nemo, until it was surpassed by Incredibles 2 in 2018. Toy Story 3 grossed more than the first two films combined, making it the first animated film to have crossed the $1 billion mark. In August 2010, it surpassed Shrek 2, becoming the highest-grossing animated film of all time until it was surpassed by Frozen, another Disney production, in March 2014. The film was released on DVD and Blu-ray on November 2, 2010.

=== Toy Story 4 (2019) ===
Toy Story 4, the fourth feature film in the franchise, was released on June 21, 2019. Taking place some time after Toy Story 3, the story involves Woody, Buzz, and the other toys living with their new owner Bonnie. On her first day of kindergarten, Bonnie creates a toy spork, named Forky (voiced by Tony Hale), out of garbage. Woody, having been neglected by Bonnie lately, personally takes it upon himself to keep Forky out of harm's way. During a road trip with Bonnie's family, Woody, to his delight, encounters his old friend and former fellow toy Bo Peep (Annie Potts), who he had been separated from in the interim period between Toy Story 2 and Toy Story 3 and has to deal with fears of becoming a "lost toy". Don Rickles died in 2017 prior to the production of the film, but Pixar used archival recordings of Rickles to continue his voice work for the film. Additional new cast members include Keegan-Michael Key, Jordan Peele, Keanu Reeves, Ally Maki, and Christina Hendricks. The film was originally announced in November 2014 during an investor's call with Lasseter to direct, Galyn Susman to produce, with the screenplay written by Rashida Jones and Will McCormack based on the story developed by Lasseter, Andrew Stanton, Pete Docter, and Lee Unkrich. During production, however, Lasseter stepped down from his position at Pixar in 2017, though remained to consult for the film; Josh Cooley was named as the film's director, with Jonas Rivera replacing Susman as producer. The film underwent a major revision following the departures of Jones and McCormack later in 2017, with Stephany Folsom replacing them as screenwriter. Much of the original script by Jones and McCormack had to be dropped, delaying the release of the film.

=== Toy Story 5 (2026) ===
In February 2019, Allen expressed interest in doing a fifth film. He explained that, since Toy Story 4 released the series from being constrained to trilogy status, he did not "see any reason why they wouldn't do it". On The Ellen DeGeneres Show that May, Hanks said Toy Story 4 would be the final installment in the franchise, but producer Mark Nielsen disclosed the possibility of a fifth film, as Pixar was not ruling it out. In February 2023, Disney CEO Bob Iger announced that the franchise would continue with additional films, while Allen confirmed his return as the voice of Buzz. Later in the month, Pixar CCO and franchise alumnus Pete Docter stated the film would be "surprising" and would have "cool things you've never seen before". In June 2023, Docter confirmed Woody would return in the film. In April 2024, it was revealed the film would release on June 19, 2026. In June 2024, Docter revealed that Andrew Stanton was directing the film. In August 2024, at the D23 Expo, it was revealed that the plot would involve the toys fighting technology, and would also involve an army of Buzz Lightyear toys controlled by computers. In addition, Kenna Harris would co-direct the film. In April 2025, Tim Allen confirmed that Woody and Buzz Lightyear would reunite in the film. In June 2025, Docter confirmed that Joan Cusack would return to voice Jessie, while also confirming the return of Mr. Potato Head, Slinky Dog, Rex, Hamm and Bo Peep.

=== Future ===
In April 2026, ahead of the release of Toy Story 5, director Andrew Stanton revealed that brainstorming sessions that generated enough narrative material to potentially explore two more sequels. Stanton also hinted that the future sequels will likely shift away from Bonnie and center on a completely different character. However, as of 2026, Pixar has not yet officially confirmed any sequels.

== Short films ==
=== Lamp Life (2020) ===
Lamp Life reveals Bo Peep's fate after she left Andy's house, between the events of Toy Story 2 and Toy Story 3. where she was sold to a private family one rainy night. she was used as a night light for first one and then two children. When they didn't need Bo Peep anymore she was shipped and donated to the antique shop, where she and her sheep eventually abandoned their home lamp and were reunited with Woody. It was released on Disney+ on January 31, 2020.

Valerie LaPointe, who was a story supervisor for Toy Story 4, wrote and directed the short film. Annie Potts and Ally Maki returned as Bo Peep and Giggle McDimples. However, Woody is voiced by Jim Hanks, the younger brother of Tom Hanks.

=== Toy Story Back-to-School Lunchbox Disaster! (2026) ===
Toy Story Back-to-School Lunchbox Disaster! is a three-minute short film released on Disney+ and the Disney Kids YouTube channel on August 10, 2026.

== Television specials ==
Pixar has also developed two 22-minute Toy Story television specials for ABC. They also air them on Disney Channel, Disney XD, and Disney Junior.

=== Toy Story of Terror! (2013) ===
Toy Story of Terror! was a Halloween-themed special and aired on October 16, 2013.

Jessie is the protagonist of this special. Where she faces her fears to not give up rescuing other toys and always finding ways to do stuff without giving up.

=== Toy Story That Time Forgot (2014) ===
Toy Story That Time Forgot was a Christmas-themed special that aired on December 2, 2014.

Trixie is the protagonist of this special. Where she realises that it doesn't matter what way their kid treats them. its about being there for their kid .

== Shows ==
=== Toy Story Toons (2011–2012) ===
A series of shorts consisting of three theatrical short films: Hawaiian Vacation (2011), Small Fry (2011) and Partysaurus Rex (2012).

=== Forky Asks a Question (2019–2020) ===
A series of shorts titled Forky Asks a Question for Disney+, with the new character Forky from Toy Story 4 (voiced by Tony Hale), was released on the launch date of the service on November 12, 2019.

=== Pixar Popcorn (2021) ===
Pixar Popcorn features three Toy Story shorts, "To Fitness and Beyond", and two Fluffy Stuff with Ducky and Bunny shorts, "Three Heads" and "Love". They were released on January 21, 2021.

== Buzz Lightyear Spin-offs ==
=== Buzz Lightyear of Star Command: The Adventure Begins (2000) ===
Buzz Lightyear of Star Command: The Adventure Begins is a 2000 traditionally animated direct-to-video television film produced by Walt Disney Television Animation with Pixar Animation Studios as a co-production that serves as a spin-off of the Toy Story franchise. The film was released on August 8, 2000, and features Tim Allen as the voice of Buzz Lightyear. The film follows Buzz Lightyear as a space ranger who fights against the evil Emperor Zurg, showing the inspiration for the Buzz Lightyear toyline that exists in the Toy Story series. The film later led to the television series, Buzz Lightyear of Star Command. Although the film was criticized for not using the same animation as the Toy Story films, it sold three million VHS and DVDs in its first week of release.

=== Buzz Lightyear of Star Command (2000–2001) ===
Buzz Lightyear of Star Command is an animated television series produced by Walt Disney Television Animation and co-produced by Pixar Animation Studios that is a spin-off of the Toy Story franchise, and was led from the direct-to-video film Buzz Lightyear of Star Command: The Adventure Begins, depicting the in-universe Toy Story series on which the Buzz Lightyear toy is based. The series takes place in the far future, featuring Buzz Lightyear voiced by Patrick Warburton (replacing Tim Allen), a famous, experienced Space Ranger who takes a crew of rookies under his wing as he investigates criminal activity across the galaxy and attempts to bring down Evil Emperor Zurg once and for all. It aired on UPN from October 2, 2000, to November 29, 2000, and on ABC from October 14, 2000, to January 13, 2001.

=== Lightyear (2022) ===
Lightyear is a spin-off film of the Toy Story series that explains Buzz Lightyear's backstory and the film chronology Andy watched. Buzz is voiced by Chris Evans in the title role. Directed by Angus MacLane, the film was released on June 17, 2022.

== Reception ==
=== Box office performance ===
Toy Story's first five days of domestic release (on Thanksgiving weekend), earned the film $39.1 million. The film placed first in the weekend's box office with $29.1 million, and maintained its number one position at the domestic box office for the following two weekends. It was the highest-grossing domestic film in 1995, and the third-highest-grossing animated film at the time.

Toy Story 2 opened at No. 1 over the Thanksgiving Day weekend, with a three-day tally of $57.4 million from 3,236 theaters. It averaged $17,734 per theater over three days during that weekend, and stayed at No. 1 for the next two weekends. It was the third-highest-grossing film of 1999.

Toy Story 3 had a strong debut, opening in 4,028 theaters and grossing $41.1 million at the box office on its opening day. In addition, Toy Story 3 had the highest opening-day gross for an animated film on record. During its opening weekend, the film grossed $110.3 million, making it #1 for the weekend; it was the biggest opening weekend ever for any Pixar film. Toy Story 3 stayed at the #1 spot for the next weekend. The film had the second-highest opening ever for an animated film at the time. It was the highest-grossing film of 2010, both domestically and worldwide. Toy Story 3 grossed over $1 billion, making it the seventh film in history, the second Disney film in 2010, and the first animated film to do so.

Toy Story 4 achieved the biggest opening for the series and the biggest for a G-rated film, grossing $120.9 million domestically and $244.5 internationally in its first weekend. It went on to gross $1.073 billion, becoming the 43rd movie ever to cross the billion dollar mark and was the eighth-highest-grossing film of 2019.

Toy Story 5 grossed $159.7 million domestically and $150.5 million from other territories to open to $310.2 million worldwide, surpassing Toy Story 4 on its opening weekend and marking the franchise, and Pixar's, biggest debut to date. Toy Story 5 currently stands as the third highest-grossing film of 2026.

Lightyear underperformed at the global box office, grossing a total of $226.4 million. Its first weekend gross totaled $85.2 million, underperforming expectations, attributed by observers to a lackluster audience turnout due to multiple factors including the COVID-19 pandemic, the release of past Pixar films Soul, Luca, and Turning Red on Disney+, and its more mixed reviews compared to other films in the franchise.

Film	U.S. release date	Box office gross			All-time ranking		Budget	Ref(s)
Film	U.S. release date	U.S. and Canada	Other territories	Worldwide	U.S. and Canada	Worldwide	Budget	Ref(s)
Main series
Toy Story	November 22, 1995	$229,947,062	$171,210,907	$401,157,969	238	368	$30 million	
Toy Story 2	November 24, 1999	$245,852,179	$251,523,225	$497,375,404	140	229	$90 million	
Toy Story 3	June 18, 2010	$415,004,880	$652,311,221	$1,067,316,101	47	47	$200 million	
Toy Story 4	June 21, 2019	$434,038,008	$639,356,585	$1,073,394,593	37	46	$200 million	
Toy Story 5	June 19, 2026	$480,294,461	$669,103,526	$1,149,397,987	27	35	$250 million	
Spin-off
Lightyear	June 17, 2022	$118,307,188	$108,118,232	$226,425,420	592	742	$200 million	
Total		$1,923,443,778	$2,491,107,319	$4,414,551,097	16	19	$970 million	(Note: The total also includes Toy Story and Toy Story 2 re-releases in Disney Digital 3-D: U.S. and Canada – $30,702,446; Other territories – $1,582,154; Worldwide – $32,284,600)

=== Critical and public response ===
Film	Critical		Public
Film	Rotten Tomatoes	Metacritic	CinemaScore
Main series
Toy Story	100% (163 reviews)	96 (26 reviews)	A
Toy Story 2	100% (171 reviews)	88 (34 reviews)	A+
Toy Story 3	98% (313 reviews)	92 (39 reviews)	A
Toy Story 4	96% (461 reviews)	84 (57 reviews)	A
Toy Story 5	92% (331 reviews)	73 (55 reviews)	A
Spin-off
Lightyear	74% (321 reviews)	60 (57 reviews)	A−
Television specials
Toy Story of Terror!	94% (17 reviews)	80 (7 reviews)	—N/a
Toy Story That Time Forgot	92% (12 reviews)	81 (8 reviews)	—N/a

According to Rotten Tomatoes, the Toy Story franchise is the most critically acclaimed franchise of all time. The first two films received a 100% rating, while the third, fourth, and fifth films have earned 98%, 96%, and 92% ratings, respectively. According to the site, no other franchise has had all of its films so highly rated—the Before trilogy comes tied with 98%, and the Dollars trilogy and The Lord of the Rings trilogy come after with average ratings of 95% and 94%, respectively, while the Toy Story franchise has an average of 98%.

According to Metacritic, the Toy Story franchise is the second most critically acclaimed franchise of all time, after The Lord of the Rings trilogy, having an average rounded score of 90 out of 100.

=== Accolades ===
Toy Story was nominated for three Academy Awards, including Best Original Screenplay, Best Original Score and Best Original Song for Randy Newman's "You've Got a Friend in Me." John Lasseter, the director of the film, also received a Special Achievement Award for "the development and inspired application of techniques that have made possible the first feature-length computer-animated film." Toy Story was also the first animated film to be nominated for the Academy Award for Best Original Screenplay. At the 53rd Golden Globe Awards, Toy Story earned two Golden Globe nominations—Best Motion Picture – Musical or Comedy and Best Original Song. It was also nominated for Best Special Visual Effects at the 50th British Academy Film Awards.

Toy Story 2 won a Golden Globe for Best Motion Picture – Musical or Comedy and earned a single Academy Award nomination for the song "When She Loved Me," performed by Sarah McLachlan. The Academy Award for Best Animated Feature was introduced in 2001 after the first two Toy Story installments.

Toy Story 3 won two Academy Awards – Best Animated Feature and Best Original Song for "We Belong Together". It earned three other nominations, including Best Picture, Best Adapted Screenplay, and Best Sound Editing. It was the third animated film in history to be nominated for Best Picture, after Beauty and the Beast and Up. Toy Story 3 also won the Golden Globe for Best Animated Feature Film and the award for Best Animated Film at the British Academy Film Awards.

Toy Story 4 won the Academy Award for Best Animated Feature and was also nominated for Best Original Song for Newman's "I Can't Let You Throw Yourself Away." It is the first animated franchise to win Best Animated Feature award twice. It's also the first animated franchise to have every film nominated in the same category (Original Song). It was also nominated to the Golden Globe for Best Animated Feature Film (but lost against Missing Link) and nominated for Best Animated Film at the British Academy Film Awards.

Toy Story film series at the Academy Awards
Category	68th Academy Awards Toy Story	72nd Academy Awards Toy Story 2	83rd Academy Awards Toy Story 3	92nd Academy Awards Toy Story 4
Best Picture			Nominated	
Animated Feature	Award not yet introduced		Won	Won
Adapted Screenplay	Ineligible in this category		Nominated	
Original Score	Nominated			
Original Screenplay	Nominated	Ineligible in this category		
Original Song	Nominated	Nominated	Won	Nominated
Sound Editing			Nominated	
Special Achievement Award	Won (Note: John Lasseter for "First Feature-Length Computer-Animated Film.")			

== Cast and characters ==
List indicators

This section includes characters who will appear or have appeared in the franchise.

- An empty grey cell indicates the character was not in the film, or that the character's official presence has not yet been confirmed.
- ^{A} indicates an appearance through archival footage or audio.
- ^{C} indicates a cameo role.
- ^{U} indicates an uncredited appearance.
- ^{Y} indicates a younger version of the character.
- ^{S} indicates an appearance as a character's singing voice.

Characters	Films							Interstitials	Television series	Short films				Television specials	
Characters	Theatrical						Direct-to-video	Interstitials	Television series	Theatrical	Disney+ Original			Television specials	
Characters	Main films					Spin-off films		Interstitials	Television series	Theatrical	Disney+ Original			Television specials	
Characters	Toy Story	Toy Story 2	Toy Story 3	Toy Story 4	Toy Story 5	Lightyear	Buzz Lightyear of Star Command: The Adventure Begins	Toy Story Treats	Buzz Lightyear of Star Command	Toy Story Toons	Forky Asks a Question	Lamp Life	Pixar Popcorn	Toy Story of Terror!	Toy Story That Time Forgot
Sheriff Woody Pride	Tom Hanks	Tom Hanks	Tom Hanks	Tom Hanks	Tom Hanks		Jim Hanks	Jim Hanks	Intro cameo	Tom Hanks		Jim Hanks		Tom Hanks	Tom Hanks
Buzz Lightyear	Tim Allen	Tim Allen (Note: Allen also voices Ultra Buzz Lightyear, another Buzz toy who believes he’s a real space ranger.)	Tim Allen Javier Fernández-Peña (Note: Fernández-Peña portrays Lightyear when he speaks in Spanish.)	Tim Allen	Tim Allen (Note: Allen also voices a group of Hi-Tech Edition Buzz Lightyears.)	Chris Evans	Tim Allen Patrick Warburton	Pat Fraley	Patrick Warburton	Tim Allen Javier Fernández-Peña			Silent cameo	Tim Allen	Tim Allen
Mr. Potato Head	Don Rickles	Don Rickles	Don Rickles	Don Rickles (Note: Don Rickles, who died in the year 2017, appears in Toy Story 4 through the use of unused recordings from the previous Toy Story films.)	Jeff Bergman					Don Rickles			Silent cameo	Don Rickles	Don Rickles
Slinky Dog	Jim Varney	Jim Varney	Blake Clark	Blake Clark	Blake Clark		Silent cameo			Blake Clark			Silent cameo		
Rex	Wallace Shawn	Wallace Shawn	Wallace Shawn	Wallace Shawn	Wallace Shawn		Wallace Shawn	Wallace Shawn	Intro cameo	Wallace Shawn	Wallace Shawn		Silent cameo	Wallace Shawn	Wallace Shawn
Hamm	John Ratzenberger	John Ratzenberger	John Ratzenberger	John Ratzenberger	John Ratzenberger		Andrew Stanton	John Ratzenberger	Intro cameo	John Ratzenberger	John Ratzenberger		Silent cameo		
Bo Peep	Annie Potts	Annie Potts	Silent cameo	Annie Potts	Annie Potts				Intro cameo			Annie Potts			
Andy Davis	John Morris	John Morris	John Morris Charlie Bright^{Y}	John Morris^{C} Jack McGraw^{Y}											
Sid Phillips	Erik von Detten		Erik von Detten^{C}					Erik von Detten^{A}							
Jennifer Davis	Laurie Metcalf	Laurie Metcalf	Laurie Metcalf	Laurie Metcalf											
Sarge	R. Lee Ermey	R. Lee Ermey	R. Lee Ermey				R. Lee Ermey	R. Lee Ermey							
Hannah Phillips	Sarah Freeman														
Aliens	Jeff Pidgeon	Jeff Pidgeon	Jeff Pidgeon	Jeff Pidgeon	Silent role	Drawing	Patrick Warburton	Jeff Pidgeon	Patrick Warburton	Jeff Pidgeon			Silent cameo		Silent role
Molly Davis	Baby sounds only	Hannah Unkrich	Bea Miller Hannah Unkrich^{A}	Uncredited cameo											
Lenny	Joe Ranft	Silent role	Silent cameo					Silent role							
Robot	Jeff Pidgeon	Silent role	Silent cameo				Silent cameo	Silent role							
Mr. Spell	Jeff Pidgeon	Jeff Pidgeon						Silent role			Jeff Pidgeon				
Mr. Shark	Andrew Stanton	Silent role						Andrew Stanton							
Billy, Goat and Gruff	Animal sounds only	Animal sounds only		Emily Davis				Silent role				Emily Davis	Silent role		
Jessica Jane "Jessie" Pride		Joan Cusack	Joan Cusack	Joan Cusack	Joan Cusack		Silent cameo		Intro cameo	Joan Cusack			Silent cameo	Joan Cusack	Joan Cusack
Stinky Pete The Prospector		Kelsey Grammer													
Al McWhiggin		Wayne Knight												Deleted scene	
Mrs. Potato Head		Estelle Harris	Estelle Harris	Estelle Harris	Anna Vocino					Estelle Harris			Silent cameo		
Barbie		Jodi Benson	Jodi Benson	Silent cameo						Jodi Benson					
The Cleaner		Jonathan Harris		Photograph											
Wheezy		Joe Ranft Robert Goulet^{S}	Silent cameo				Joe Ranft		Intro cameo						
Emperor Zurg	Deleted scene	Andrew Stanton	Silent cameo		Andrew Stanton (Note: Stanton voice a Hi-Tech Edition Emperor Zurg uncredited.)	James Brolin	Wayne Knight		Wayne Knight						
Bullseye		Animal sounds only	Animal sounds only	Animal sounds only	Alan Cumming (Note: Cumming voices Bullseye’s playtime alter ego, Evil Bullseye. Animal sounds are still provided for Bullseye.)		Silent cameo		Intro cameo	Animal sounds only			Silent cameo		
Emily		Silent role			Adrienne Isaac^{C}^{U}										
Lots-O'-Huggin' Bear "Lotso"			Ned Beatty												
Ken			Michael Keaton							Michael Keaton					
Bonnie Anderson			Emily Hahn	Madeleine McGraw	Scarlett Spears					Emily Hahn	Photograph			Emily Hahn	Emily Hahn
Chatter Telephone			Teddy Newton												
Chuckles			Bud Luckey							Bud Luckey					
Mr. Pricklepants			Timothy Dalton	Timothy Dalton	John Hopkins					Timothy Dalton	Robin Atkin Downes		Silent cameo	Timothy Dalton	Timothy Dalton
Mrs. Anderson			Lori Alan	Lori Alan	Lori Alan					Lori Alan	Silent cameo			Lori Alan	Lori Alan
Trixie			Kristen Schaal	Kristen Schaal	Kristen Schaal					Kristen Schaal	Kristen Schaal		Silent cameo	Kristen Schaal	Kristen Schaal
Buttercup			Jeff Garlin	Jeff Garlin	Silent role					Jeff Garlin	Jeff Garlin				
Dolly			Bonnie Hunt	Bonnie Hunt	Bonnie Hunt					Bonnie Hunt	Bonnie Hunt		Silent cameo		
Twitch			John Cygan												
Stretch			Whoopi Goldberg												
Chunk			Jack Angel												
Sparks			Jan Rabson												
Bookworm			Richard Kind												
Peas-in-a-Pod			Charlie Bright, Brianna Maiwand, and Amber Kroner	Silent cameo						Zoe Levin	Mika Crespo and Imani Prior		Silent cameo		
Frog			Jack Willis												
Big Baby			Woody Smith												
Walter Anderson			Silent role	Jay Hernandez	Jay Hernandez										
Forky				Tony Hale	Tony Hale						Tony Hale		Silent cameo		
Duke Caboom				Keanu Reeves	Keanu Reeves							Silent cameo			
Ducky				Keegan-Michael Key	Silent cameo								Keegan-Michael Key		
Bunny				Jordan Peele	Silent cameo								Jordan Peele		
Giggle McDimples				Ally Maki	Silent cameo						Photograph	Ally Maki			
Gabby Gabby				Christina Hendricks								Silent cameo			
Dummies				Steve Purcell								Silent cameo			
Margaret				June Squibb								Silent cameo			
Harmony				Lila Sage Bromley											
Harmony's mom				Patricia Arquette											
Miss Wendy				Juliana Hansen											
Melephant Brooks				Mel Brooks							Mel Brooks		Silent cameo		
Chairol Burnett				Carol Burnett							Carol Burnett				
Carl Reineroceros				Carl Reiner							Carl Reiner		Silent cameo		
Bitey White				Betty White							Betty White		Silent cameo		
Axel				Bill Hader											
Karen Beverly				Melissa Villaseñor	Melissa Villaseñor										
Combat Carl	Silent role			Carl Weathers	Ernie Hudson									Carl Weathers	
Old Timer				Alan Oppenheimer							Alan Oppenheimer		Silent cameo	Christian Roman	
Reptillus Maximus				Lunchbox cameo											Kevin McKidd
Rib Tickles				Deleted scene							Aloma Wright				
Lilypad					Greta Lee										
Smarty Pants					Conan O'Brien										
Atlas					Craig Robinson										
Snappy					Shelby Rabara										
Blaze Manoukian					Mykal-Michelle Harris										
Mrs. Manoukian					Krys Marshall										
Dr. Nutcase					Matty Matheson										
Pizza with Sunglasses					Benito Antonio Martínez Ocasio										
Inflatable Flamingo					Tyla (Note: Only in the Sub-Saharan African localized version)										
Garden Gnome					Jerome Ranft										
Jimmy Dean					Andrew Stanton										
Captain Suds					Andrew Stanton					Corey Burton					
Izzy Hawthorne						Keke Palmer Keira Hairston^{Y}									
Darby Steel						Dale Soules									
Mo Morrison						Taika Waititi									
Sox						Peter Sohn									
Alisha Hawthorne						Uzo Aduba									
I.V.A.N						Mary McDonald-Lewis									
Diaz						Efren Ramirez									
Commander Burnside						Isiah Whitlock Jr.									
Mira Nova							Nicole Sullivan		Nicole Sullivan						
XR							Larry Miller		Larry Miller						
Booster							Stephen Furst		Stephen Furst						
Commander Nebula							Adam Carolla		Adam Carolla						
Warp Darkmatter Agent Z							Diedrich Bader		Diedrich Bader						
Brain Pods							Charles Kimbrough Sean Hayes		Charles Kimbrough Sean Hayes						

== Crew ==
Role	Films					Television specials		Spin-off
Role	Toy Story	Toy Story 2	Toy Story 3	Toy Story 4	Toy Story 5	Toy Story of Terror!	Toy Story That Time Forgot	Lightyear
Director(s)	John Lasseter	John Lasseter Co-Directors: Lee Unkrich; Ash Brannon	Lee Unkrich	Josh Cooley	Andrew Stanton Co-Director: Kenna Harris	Angus MacLane	Steve Purcell	Angus MacLane
Producer(s)	Bonnie Arnold; Ralph Guggenheim	Helene Plotkin; Karen Robert Jackson	Darla K. Anderson	Mark Nielsen; Jonas Rivera; Galyn Susman	Lindsey Collins; Jessica Choi	Galyn Susman	Galyn Susman	Galyn Susman
Screenwriter(s)	Joss Whedon; Andrew Stanton; Joel Cohen; Alec Sokolow	Andrew Stanton; Rita Hsiao; Doug Chamberlin; Chris Webb	Michael Arndt	Andrew Stanton; Stephany Folsom	Andrew Stanton; Kenna Harris	Angus MacLane	Steve Purcell	Angus MacLane; Jason Headley
Story by	John Lasseter; Pete Docter; Andrew Stanton; Joe Ranft	John Lasseter; Pete Docter; Ash Brannon; Andrew Stanton	John Lasseter; Andrew Stanton; Lee Unkrich	John Lasseter; Andrew Stanton; Josh Cooley; Valerie LaPointe; Rashida Jones; Will McCormack; Martin Hynes; Stephany Folsom	Andrew Stanton	Angus MacLane	Steve Purcell	Angus MacLane; Jason Headley; Matthew Aldrich
Executive Producer(s)	Ed Catmull; Steve Jobs	Sarah McArthur	John Lasseter	Andrew Stanton; Lee Unkrich; Pete Docter	Pete Docter; Jonas Rivera	John Lasseter; Andrew Stanton	John Lasseter	Andrew Stanton; Pete Docter
Composer	Randy Newman	Randy Newman	Randy Newman	Randy Newman	Randy Newman	Michael Giacchino	Michael Giacchino	Michael Giacchino
Editor(s)	Robert Gordon; Lee Unkrich	Edie Bleiman; David Ian Salter; Lee Unkrich	Ken Schretzmann	Axel Geddes	Jennifer Jew	Axel Geddes	David Suther	Anthony J. Greenberg
Cinematographer(s)	—N/a	Sharon Calahan	Jeremy Lasky; Kim White	Patrick Lin; Jean-Claude Kalache	Matt Aspbury; Jean-Claude Kalache	Matthew Silas; Ian Megibben	Robert Anderson; Erik Smitt	Jeremy Lasky; Ian Megibben
Studio	Pixar Animation Studios	Pixar Animation Studios	Pixar Animation Studios	Pixar Animation Studios	Pixar Animation Studios	Pixar Animation Studios	Pixar Animation Studios	Pixar Animation Studios
Distributor	Walt Disney Studios Motion Pictures	Walt Disney Studios Motion Pictures	Walt Disney Studios Motion Pictures	Walt Disney Studios Motion Pictures	Walt Disney Studios Motion Pictures	Walt Disney Studios Motion Pictures	Walt Disney Studios Motion Pictures	Walt Disney Studios Motion Pictures
Runtime	1hr 21 min	1hr 32 min	1hr 43 min	1hr 40 min	1hr 42 min	21 min	22 min	1hr 45 min

== Other media ==
=== Comic books ===
- A 4-issue limited series Toy Story: Mysterious Stranger was published by Boom! Entertainment from May to August 2009; This was followed by an 8-issue ongoing series, starting with #0 in November 2009. Two Buzz Lightyear one-shots were released in 2010, also by Boom! Entertainment; these were for Free Comic Book Day and Halloween, which was collected as Toy Story: The Return of Buzz Lightyear. A second 4-issue limited series, Toy Story: Toy Overboard was published by Boom! Entertainment from July to October 2010.
- A 4-issue limited series by Marvel Comics Toy Story: Tales from the Toy Chest was published from May to August 2012.
- Toy Story magazine was first released on July 21, 2010. Each edition was 24 pages in length, apart from the launch edition, which was 28 pages.
- A one-shot anthology comic book by Dark Horse Comics was released to tie in with Toy Story 4 in 2019. The comic picks up just after the events of the film, also exploring the backstories of Duke Caboom, Ducky, Bunny, Bo Peep and Giggle McDimples during their exploits as a band of lost toys.

=== Video games ===
- Toy Story (1995) (Sega Genesis, Super Nintendo Entertainment System, Microsoft Windows, and Game Boy)
- Disney's Activity Center: Toy Story (1996) (Microsoft Windows)
- Disney's Animated Storybook: Toy Story (1996) (Microsoft Windows and macOS)
- Disney's Activity Center: Toy Story 2 (2000) (Microsoft Windows)
- Toy Story 2: Buzz Lightyear to the Rescue (1999) (Dreamcast, PlayStation, Nintendo 64, Microsoft Windows, macOS, and Game Boy Color)
- Toy Story 2: Woody Sousaku Daisakusen!! (2000) (Sega Pico) – released only in Japan
- Buzz Lightyear of Star Command (2000) (Game Boy Color, PlayStation, Dreamcast, and Microsoft Windows)
- Jessie's Wild West Rodeo (2001) (Microsoft Windows and macOS)
- Toy Story Racer (2001) (PlayStation and Game Boy Color)
- Disney Hotshots: Toy Story 2 (2003) (Microsoft Windows)
- Toy Story 2: Operation Rescue Woody! (2005) (V.Smile)
- Toy Story Mania! (2009) (Wii, Microsoft Windows, Xbox 360, and PlayStation 3).
- Disney•Pixar Toy Story 3 (2010) (LeapPad, LeapPad2, LeapPad3, LeapPad Platinum, LeapPad Ultra, LeapPad Jr., Leapster Explorer, and LeapsterGS Explorer)
- Toy Story 3: The Video Game (2010) (PlayStation 2, PlayStation 3, Xbox 360, Wii, PlayStation Portable, Nintendo DS, Microsoft Windows, macOS, iOS, Nintendo Switch, Nintendo Switch 2, PlayStation 4, PlayStation 5, Xbox One, and Xbox Series X/S)
- Shooting Beena: Toy Story 3 – Woody to Buzz no Daibōken! (2010) (Advanced Pico Beena) – released only in Japan
- Toy Story: Smash It! (2013) (iOS and Android)
- Toy Story Drop! (2019) (iOS and Android)
- Toy Story: Retro Roundup! (2026) (Nintendo Switch, Nintendo Switch 2, PlayStation 4, PlayStation 5, Windows, Xbox One, and Xbox Series X/S)

==== Games featuring Toy Story characters ====
- Disney Learning: 1st Grade (2000) (Microsoft Windows and macOS)
- Disney Learning: 2nd Grade (2000) (Microsoft Windows and macOS)
- Disney•Pixar Learning: 1st Grade (2002) (Microsoft Windows and macOS)
- Disney•Pixar Learning: 2nd and 3rd Grade (2002) (Microsoft Windows and macOS)
- Disney's Extreme Skate Adventure (2003) (Game Boy Advance, PlayStation 2, Xbox, and GameCube)
- LittleBigPlanet 2 (2011) (PlayStation 3)
- Disney•Pixar Pixar Pals (2011) (LeapPad, LeapPad2, LeapPad3, LeapPad Platinum, LeapPad Ultra, LeapPad Jr., Leapster Explorer, and LeapsterGS Explorer)
- Kinect: Disneyland Adventures (2011) (Xbox 360, Xbox One, and Microsoft Windows)
- Kinect Rush: A Disney•Pixar Adventure (2012) (Xbox 360, Xbox One, and Microsoft Windows)
- Disney Infinity (2013) (PlayStation 3, Xbox 360, Wii, Wii U, Nintendo 3DS, Microsoft Windows, iOS, and Apple TV)
- Disney Magic Kingdoms (2016) (mobile)
- Disney Heroes: Battle Mode (2018) (mobile)
- Lego The Incredibles (2018) (PlayStation 4, Xbox One, Nintendo Switch, Microsoft Windows, and macOS)
- Kingdom Hearts III (2019) (PlayStation 4 and Xbox One)
- Disney Sorcerer's Arena (2020) (mobile)
- Disney Mirrorverse (2022) (mobile)
- Disney Dreamlight Valley (2022) (PlayStation 5, PlayStation 4, Xbox Series X/S, Xbox One, Nintendo Switch, Microsoft Windows, and macOS)
- Disney Speedstorm (2023) (PlayStation 5, PlayStation 4, Nintendo Switch, Xbox Series X/S, Xbox One, Microsoft Windows, macOS, Android, and iSO)

Pixar created some original animations for the games, including fully animated sequences for PC titles.

Woody and Buzz Lightyear were originally going to appear in the Final Mix version of the Disney/Square Enix video game Kingdom Hearts II. They were omitted from the final product, but their models appear in the game's coding, without textures. The director of the Kingdom Hearts series, Tetsuya Nomura, stated that he would like to include Pixar properties in future Kingdom Hearts games, given Disney's purchase of Pixar. A Toy Story-themed world called Toy Box appears in Kingdom Hearts III, marking the first time that Pixar-based content appears in the series, along with Monsters, Inc. and Ratatouille.

=== Merchandising and software ===
Toy Story had a large promotion before its release, leading to numerous tie-ins with the film including images on food packaging. A variety of merchandise was released during the film's theatrical run and its initial VHS release including toys, clothing, and shoes, among other things. When action figures for Buzz Lightyear and Sheriff Woody were created, they were initially ignored by retailers. However, after over 250,000 figures were sold for each character before the film's release, demand continued to expand, eventually reaching over 25 million units sold by 2007. Also, Disney's Animated Storybook: Toy Story and Disney's Activity Center: Toy Story were released for Windows and Mac. Disney's Animated Storybook: Toy Story was the best selling software title of 1996, selling over 500,000 copies.

== Theme park attractions ==
- Buzz Lightyear's Space Ranger Spin in many Disney Parks.
- Toy Story Mania! at Disney's Hollywood Studios at the Walt Disney World Resort, Disney California Adventure at the Disneyland Resort and Tokyo DisneySea at Tokyo Disney Resort.
- Toy Story Land themed lands at Walt Disney Studios Park, Hong Kong Disneyland, Shanghai Disneyland and Disney's Hollywood Studios.
- Toy Story: The Musical on Disney Cruise Line's ship Disney Wonder.
- Totally Toy Story, an "instant theme park" then a theme area in Tomorrowland at Disneyland.

=== Totally Toy Story ===
Totally Toy Story
- Theme: Toy Story

free standing
- Opened: November 18, 1995
- Closed: January 1, 1996

Tomorrowland Disneyland
- Opened: January 27, 1996
- Closed: May 27, 1996

Totally Toy Story was an instant theme park and a promotional event for the Toy Story film premiere held at El Capitan Theatre and Masonic Convention Hall.

For the November 18, 1995, Toy Story premiere at El Capitan Theatre, Disney rented the Masonic Convention Hall, the next door building, for Totally Toy Story, an instant theme park and a promotional event for the movie. Movie goers paid an additional fee for the pop up park. The promotional event had pre-sales over $1 million and remained opened until January 1, 1996. The Toy Story Funhouse part was moved to Disneyland's Tomorrowland and opened there on January 27, 1996, and closed on May 27, 1996.

Totally Toy Story, while in Hollywood, consisted of "Toy Story Art of Animation" exhibit in El Capitan's basement and the Toy Story Funhouse at the convention hall. The fun house consisted of 30,000 square feet of various attractions. These attractions continue the story of the movie with the toys life-size.

==== Attractions ====
Toy Story Funhouse attractions:

- Hamm's Theater – "Hamm's All-Doll Revue" has energetic dancing and original songs lasted 20 minutes
- Buzz's Galaxy –
  - "Buzz & the Buzz Lites" show included music from Frank Sinatra
  - two arcade-style games, "Whack-A-Alien"
  - a motion-simulator ride
- Woody's Roundup dance hall, live musicians and country line-dancing lessons
- Pizza Planet restaurant
- Green Army Men's obstacle course, participants strap on foot base to tackle the course
- Mr. Potato Head's Playroom, contained Etch-a-Sketches and other dexterity games had a floor made up of old game boards
- Totally Interactive Room, had Sega and Nintendo Toy Story games
- Souvenir shop

== Impact ==
Toy Story's innovative computer animation had a large impact on the film industry. After the film's debut, various industries were interested in the technology used for the film. Graphics chip makers desired to compute imagery similar to the film's animation for personal computers; game developers wanted to learn how to replicate the animation for video games; and robotics researchers were interested in building artificial intelligence into their machines that compared to the lifelike characters in the film. Various authors have also compared the film to an interpretation of Don Quixote as well as humanism. The free and open-source Linux distribution Debian takes its codenames from Toy Story characters, the tradition of which came about as Bruce Perens was involved in the early development of Debian while working at Pixar.

=== Gromit Unleashed ===
In 2013, Pixar designed a "Gromit Lightyear" sculpture based on the Aardman Animations character Gromit from Wallace and Gromit for Gromit Unleashed which sold for £65,000.

=== To infinity and beyond! ===
Buzz Lightyear's classic line "To infinity and beyond!" has seen usage not only on T-shirts, but among philosophers and mathematical theorists as well. Lucia Hall of The Humanist linked the film's plot to an interpretation of humanism. She compared the phrase to "All this and heaven, too!", indicating one who is happy with a life on Earth as well as having an afterlife. In 2008, during STS-124, astronauts took an action figure of Buzz Lightyear into space on the Discovery Space Shuttle as part of an educational experience for students that also stressed the catchphrase. The action figure was used for experiments in zero-g. Also, in 2008, the phrase made international news when it was reported that a father and son had continually repeated the phrase to help them keep track of each other while treading water for 15 hours in the Atlantic Ocean.
