= TS5 =

TS5 may refer to:

- Surtees TS5, a Formula 5000 racing car
- Toy Story 5, a 2026 American film
