= Jessie (Toy Story) =

Character in the Toy Story franchise

- Toy Story character
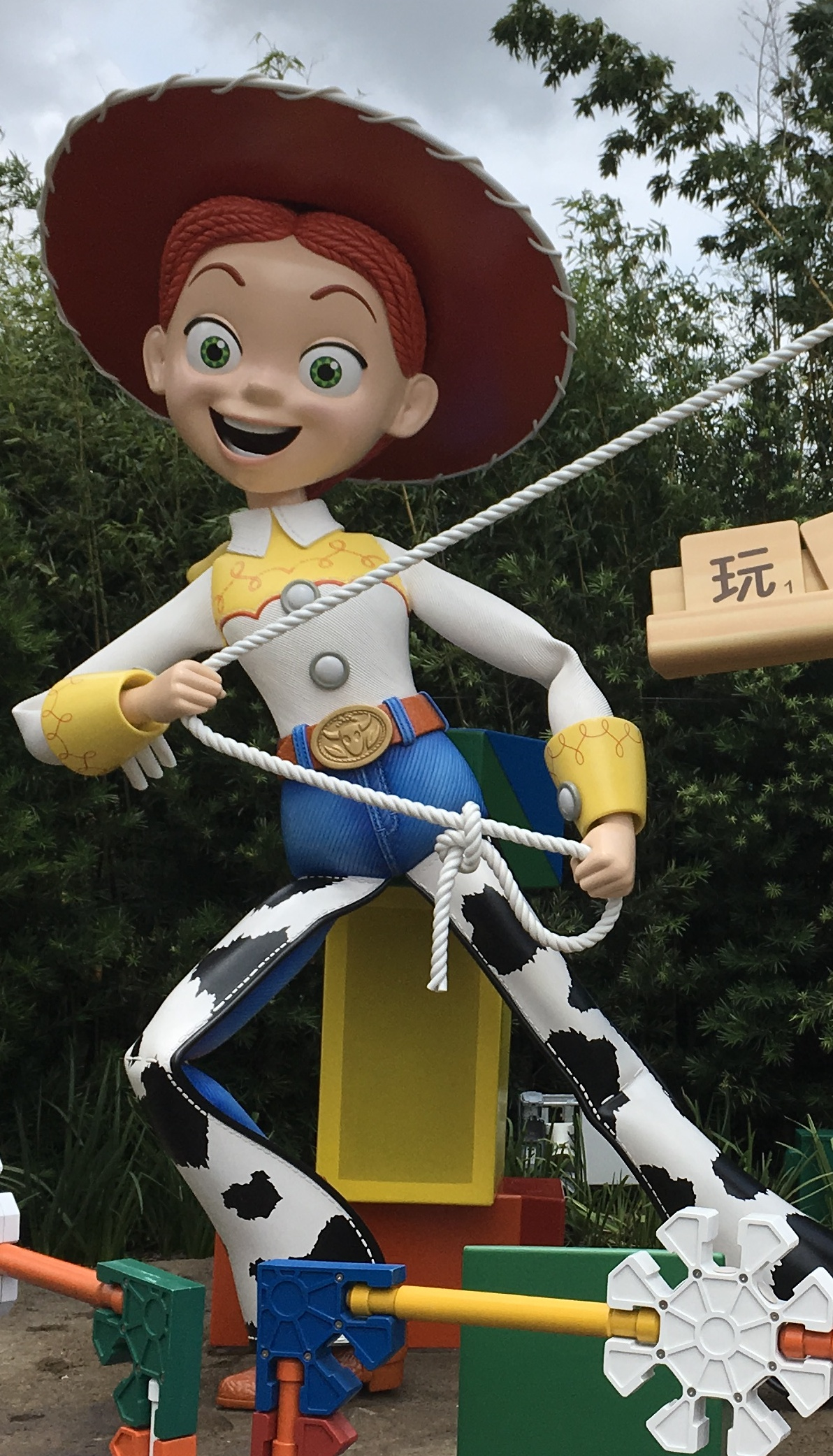
- Statue of Jessie at Shanghai Disneyland, China
- First appearance: Toy Story 2 (1999)
- Created by: John Lasseter; Pete Docter; Ash Brannon; Andrew Stanton
- Voiced by: Joan Cusack (films, Toy Story Toons, TV specials, video games, commercials); Mary Kay Bergman (Toy Story 2, yodeling and television voice); Sarah McLachlan (singing voice); Devon Dawson (soundtrack); Bettina Devin (Jessie's Wild West Rodeo, Disney's Extreme Skate Adventure); Kat Cressida (video games, theme parks)

In-universe information
- Full name: Jessica Jane Pride
- Species: Toy (Rag doll)
- Title(s): Cowgirl; Sheriff
- Relatives: Woody (brother in Woody's Roundup)

Jessica Jane "Jessie" Pride is a cowgirl rag doll and one of the central characters in the Disney–Pixar Toy Story franchise. She first appeared in Toy Story 2, and returned in the sequels, Toy Story 3, Toy Story 4, taking on the leading role in Toy Story 5. The idea for introducing a female character was suggested by Nancy Lasseter, while John Lasseter, Pete Docter, Ash Brannon, and Andrew Stanton developed and created the character. Jessie is voiced by Joan Cusack in the Toy Story filmography, while Sarah McLachlan is her singing voice in Toy Story 2. Kat Cressida voices the character in the video games, including the Disney Infinity series.

In the franchise, Jessie is a brave and excitable rag doll who was abandoned by her first owner after she outgrew her. Years of being in storage with a greedy toy collector (Al M. of Al’s Toy Barn) leads her to develop claustrophobia and abandonment issues. She is eventually rescued by series protagonist Woody and finds a new owner in Andy Davis. Years later, she and her friends are donated to a new owner in Bonnie Anderson, who claims Jessie as her new favorite toy. With Woody's departure after reuniting with Bo Peep, she is given his sheriff badge as a token of her significance to Bonnie. In Toy Story 5, Jessie takes on the role of "sheriff," attempting to help Bonnie make new friends while also going against her newly-acquired tablet, Lilypad.

Jessie has received a largely positive critical reception since her debut, with praise for her tragic backstory and her overall characterization and role in the franchise. However, many critics criticized Pixar for sidelining her in the fourth film, giving her a minimal role. Cusack's vocal performance of the character was positively received, and she was awarded for voicing Jessie at the 2000 Annie Awards.

== Development ==
=== Conception and design ===
Concept artwork of Jessie's original design for Toy Story 2

The story concept for Toy Story 2 began with director John Lasseter considering what scenario would be most upsetting for a toy. He decided that the idea of a toy collector who seals toys in cases ensuring that they will never to be played with was worse than being replaced by another toy. He took inspiration from a toy collector character that appeared in an early draft of Toy Story but was removed. The concept involved series protagonist Woody being part of a collectible set, an idea that originated in a draft story titled A Tin Toy Christmas. Ralph Guggenheim, a producer on Toy Story 2, said that the team took inspiration from 1950s children's cowboy television series, including Howdy Doody and Hopalong Cassidy, to define the rest of the characters in Woody's set: "You would find a gruff old prospector. You would find other characters, like an Annie Oakley-Calamity Jane sort of character, a tough frontier girl." Lasseter's wife Nancy also encouraged him to include a female character that would appeal to girls and to make her a more substantial character than Bo Peep. Jessie was originally created as a character named Señorita Cactus, designed as a Mexican sidekick of the prospector character to entice Woody with her feminine charms. By the time she had been redefined as Jessie, her personality was also updated to be tougher.

The Pixar team knew that a key aspect of the plot was to find a reason for Woody to leave Andy's room, so they wanted to create a compelling character to engage with Woody emotionally. Chief creative officer Pete Docter said that the team knew that Woody could not be convinced to leave through logic and reason so they decided that it needed to center on a relationship: "Jessie brought this sense of responsibility and duty". Toy Story 4 director Josh Cooley said that Jessie was created to support Woody and show him a new perspective and as she evolved she continued to support him. Production designer Bob Pauley described Jessie as "superfun and energetic and a nice complement to Woody". She was initially designed by Jill Culton, who found her hair particularly difficult, but her design was later upgraded. Lasseter said that the team worked hard on making Jessie a strong female character. He explained that after being abandoned by her owner, Jessie believes that her only opportunity to be loved by children again is in a museum, which requires a Woody doll: "her whole love of children is hinged around the fact that Woody got there". He said that several attempts were made to create the scene in which Jessie tells her backstory but when this failed to work, they found that it was better expressed through the song "When She Loved Me", written by Randy Newman and performed by Sarah McLachlan. Lasseter explained that, "every time she would tell the story, it lost some emotion". Although the Pixar team generally avoided having characters break into song, they decided that the song was the right format for expressing the emotion: "It brought tears to our eyes."

=== Voices ===
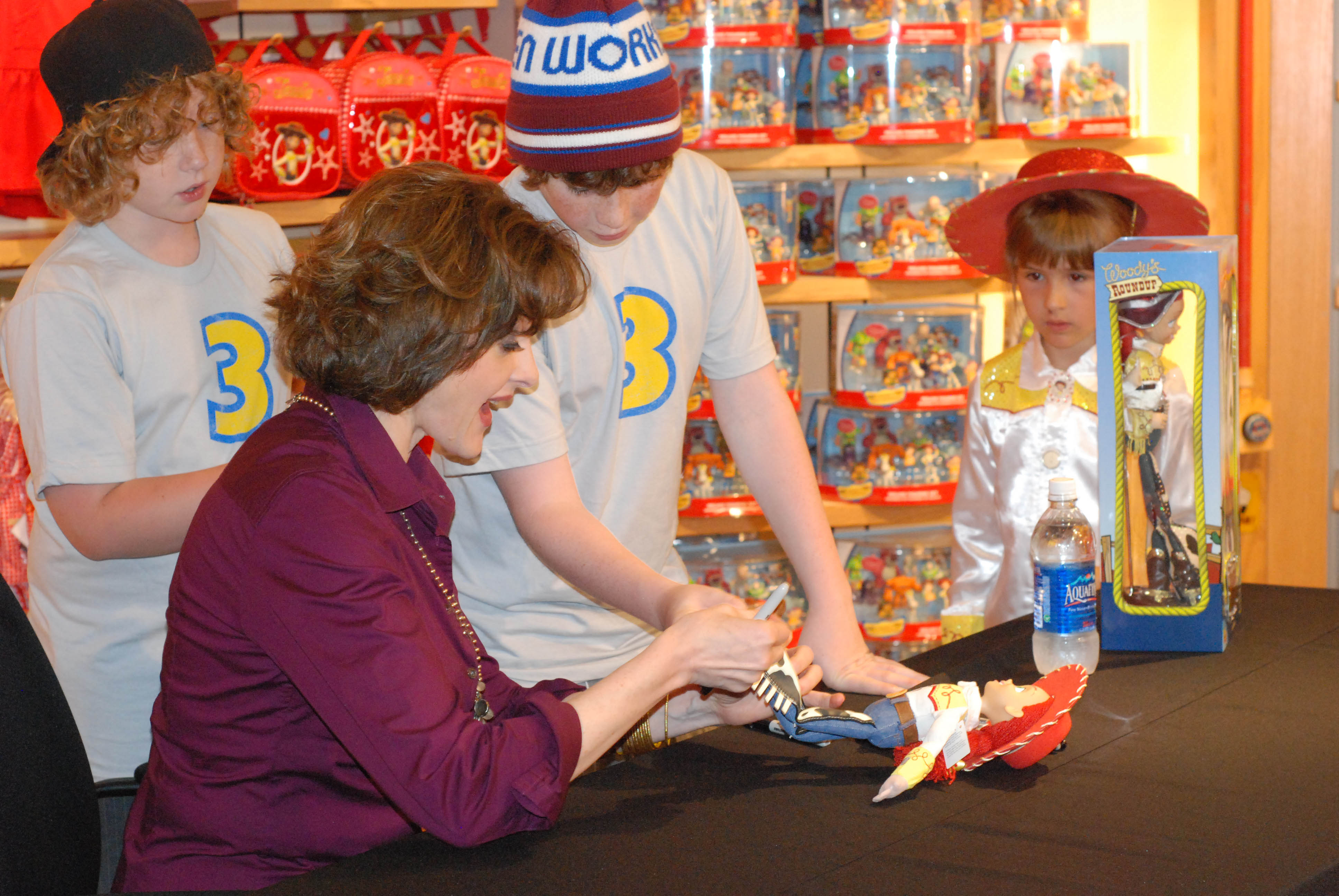
Joan Cusack (in 2010) signing a replica rag doll of Jessie

Joan Cusack was cast as the voice actor for Jessie in Toy Story 2 and voiced the role in the third, fourth and fifth Toy Story feature films. Discussing her voice work, she commented that Jessie's voice is "inherent in that cowboy genre" and that much of her characterization is "just being a kid". Lasseter was a fan of McLachlan, so she took on the singing part of the role. Newman said that she had the ability to hold long notes, so he wrote Jessie's song with her voice in mind. He was tasked by the Pixar team to write a song that would explain Jessie's relationship with her owner and her sadness when the girl grew up. In the fictional 1950s series "Woody's Roundup", Jessie's yodeling voice is provided by Mary Kay Bergman. On the film soundtrack, which was released after the film, Devon Dawson, a yodeler discovered by Riders in the Sky at a music festival, sings the part of Jessie in two songs. In addition, Kat Cressida has voiced Jessie in various media, including Disney Infinity. In Jessie's Wild West Rodeo and Disney's Extreme Skate Adventure, Jessie was voiced by Bettina Devin.

== Characteristics ==
Jessie is a red-haired, energetic, yodeling cowgirl doll. She is a part of a collectible toy set based on a fictional 1950s cowboy puppet television series named "Woody's Roundup", which consists of Sheriff Woody, Jessie, a prospector named Stinky Pete and Woody's steed Bullseye. This valuable toy collection is destined to be sold to a museum in Tokyo by a collector named Al McWhiggin. Despite having a lively spirit, Jessie has a tragic history. The song "When She Loved Me" reveals that she once had an owner who loved her until the girl eventually abandoned her. This loss leaves Jessie in a depressed state with a deep longing to be loved and played with once more. In addition, her experience of being placed in storage as a collectible toy results in her being severely claustrophobic. After making friends with Woody and the other toys, Jessie's outgoing personality returns and she develops a romantic attachment to Buzz Lightyear. Cusack described her as a "can-do girl".

== Appearances ==
=== Toy Story films ===
==== Toy Story 2 (1999) ====
When Woody is stolen by Al McWhiggin, he meets Jessie, Bullseye and Stinky Pete at Al's apartment. Woody learns that he is a rare vintage doll based on a character of the same name from a popular 1950s series titled Woody's Roundup. Upon discovering that he and the others will be sold to a toy museum in Tokyo, Woody tells them that he must get back home to his owner, which causes Jessie to become enraged due to her fear of being kept in storage. After his arm is torn off, Woody has no choice but to stay and get it fixed, while blaming Jessie for waking Al that night. Woody later has a change of heart after hearing of Jessie's traumatic past (by way of her song "When She Loved Me"), when she was loved by a girl named Emily, but was donated for charity when Emily grew too old for toys. As a result, Woody decides to stay with his roundup gang. A group of Andy's toys show up to rescue Woody, but he refuses. He eventually decides to go back to his owner and asks Jessie and Bullseye to come with him, but Stinky Pete will not let them leave as he wants them to go to Tokyo instead and the group is taken to the airport. Woody and Bullseye escape, but Jessie is taken to the airplane. With the help of Bullseye and Buzz Lightyear, Woody rescues her from the airplane. Once Andy arrives home, he accepts them into his collection, dubbing her as "Bazooka Jane."

==== Toy Story 3 (2010) ====
After Andy appears to throw his toys away, Jessie convinces the other toys to find a new home at Sunnyside Daycare, refusing to relive the trauma she felt when she was given away by Emily. She tries to persuade Woody to join the others at the daycare, but he leaves to return to Andy alone. Jessie and the other toys discover that they have been placed in a room with very young children who play with them too roughly. Mrs. Potato Head sees Andy searching for his missing toys through her missing eye, causing Jessie and the others to realize that they were wrong about him. They decide to return home, only for Lotso to order his henchmen to imprison them with the help of a reset Buzz. Following another rough play date with the young children, Andy's toys are reunited with Woody, who has a change of heart and decides to rescue his friends. The toys carry out their plan to break out of Sunnyside but accidentally reset Buzz to a Spanish mode. Spanish Buzz makes his love for Jessie apparent by passionately wooing her. Jessie is initially uncomfortable with this drastic change, but grows to like this romantic side of Buzz. When the toys get stuck in a garbage truck along with Lotso, Jessie is rescued by Spanish Buzz, who appears to be crushed by a broken television set. She despairs over his apparent death, but hugs him in relief after he is returned to normal. After the toys are nearly killed in a trash incinerator, Andy's Alien toys rescue them using a crane. They return home to Andy and prepare to be stored in the attic, but are instead given to a girl named Bonnie after Woody leaves a note for Andy, and Jessie quickly adapts to her new life as one of Bonnie's toys.

==== Toy Story 4 (2019) ====
During the prologue, set between the events of Toy Story 2 and Toy Story 3, Jessie helps Woody, Bo Peep, and the other toys save RC from the storm. Jessie is now Bonnie's favorite toy and she wears Woody's badge as a result. After Bonnie creates Forky, her parents decide to go on a road trip, taking several of her toys with her. Forky escapes and Woody follows him. The following morning, Buzz takes it upon himself to find Woody, resulting in Jessie becoming the temporary leader. Bonnie's parents begin to leave, but Jessie is able to stop them by popping the RV tires. At night, Jessie comes up with an idea to slow down Bonnie's parents and to meet up with Woody, Buzz, and Forky. Once the vehicle is parked in front of the carousel, Jessie and the other toys reunite with Bo Peep. Woody, deciding not to go back home, gives Jessie his badge and they share a heartwarming farewell before he departs. The following year, Jessie introduces Karen Beverly to Bonnie's other toys, which gets the attention of Forky.

==== Toy Story 5 (2026) ====
Jessie is appointed as the sheriff of Bonnie’s room following Woody’s departure and takes responsibility for the other toys as Bonnie becomes increasingly attached to a tablet named Lily. She attempts to reason with Lily about Bonnie’s need for real companionship, but grows concerned when Lily instead tries to engineer a friendship for Bonnie through social media. Jessie contacts Woody via walkie-talkie for guidance, fearing Bonnie is drifting away from her toys. When Bonnie attends a sleepover, Jessie stows away in her suitcase with Bullseye and Lily. After Bonnie is ridiculed by her classmates for still playing with toys, Jessie is sent home with Bullseye. They escape en route but are taken in by an elderly couple who see the address written on her chaps and bring them to the farmhouse of her original owner, Emily.

At the farmhouse, Jessie is separated from Bullseye and ends up among forgotten toys before meeting device-based inhabitants, who inform her about the current residents, the Manoukian family. She forms a brief bond with Blaze, the young girl living there, and considers her a possible bridge to reconnecting with Bonnie. Jessie is later affected by Lily’s actions as Bonnie’s toys are placed into storage, though she continues working toward a solution alongside Woody, Buzz, and the others once they arrive and counter Lily’s control. She helps coordinate the plan to exploit Lily’s speech-recognition weakness by sending a photograph to Bonnie through Blaze’s identity.

After Bonnie initially refuses to take her back due to peer ridicule, Jessie becomes demoralized and retreats to a tree connected to her past with Emily, where she discovers Emily’s old belongings and photographs showing that Emily named her daughter after her. This restores her confidence in her value and role as a toy. Jessie then works with Woody, Buzz, and the stranded Buzz units to locate Lily after she leaves in guilt aboard a donation truck, and joins the effort to convince her to help facilitate a friendship between Bonnie and Blaze. She ultimately participates in arranging Bonnie and Blaze’s renewed meeting, which leads to them bonding through imaginative play, and remains with Bonnie afterward.

=== Other films ===
Jessie was featured as a minor character in Toy Story That Time Forgot, a television special for ABC. In Toy Story of Terror!, Jessie plays a prominent role in a story where she is forced to confront her claustrophobia after Bonnie and the toys stay over at a motel. She also makes an appearance in Pixar Popcorn shorts. Jessie also appears in the short films Toy Story Toons. She makes several cameo appearances in other Disney films. She makes an appearance in Monsters, Inc. as one of Boo's toys. She can also be seen in Meet the Robinsons on a basketball poster.

=== Video games ===
Jessie has been featured in numerous Disney and Pixar-related video games. She makes an appearance in Toy Story 2: Buzz Lightyear to the Rescue. She is a playable character in Toy Story 3: The Video Game. She was introduced as a playable character in Disney Infinity as part of a Toy Story playset in October 2013. In the Disney Infinity series, she is voiced by Kat Cressida. In 2018, Jessie became an unlockable character for the mobile game Disney Heroes: Battle Mode. Additionally, a character skin for Jessie, after the release of Toy Story 4, was made available in a Toy Story Mashup Pack in Minecraft in June 2019.

=== Theme parks and attractions ===
Jessie appears as a towering figure above Toy Story Land at Walt Disney World, Orlando. In Toy Story Midway Mania!, Jessie and her friends are featured in the interactive dark ride at Disney California Adventure and Disney's Hollywood Studios. In 2019, Jessie's Critter Carousel opened at Disney California Adventure. In 2022, Jessie's Trading Post Store and Roundup Rodeo Barbecue opened in Toy Story Land at Disney's Hollywood Studios. Jessie is also a meet and greet character in Toy Story Land alongside Woody and Buzz. She has also made appearances with the other Toy Story characters in Disney on Ice.

== Merchandise ==
Disney heavily promoted Jessie following the release of Toy Story 2, as she was a character that they could market to girls, something the original film did not really provide. Among the toys released were 10" and 12" fashion-style dolls, plush and rag doll-type dolls, and action figures in the Toy Story 2 and Toy Story and Beyond lines. Other merchandise included wallets, purses and other accessories for girls, nightlights and other bedroom accessories, costumes and dress-up sets, and sculptures and collectibles. Following the film's release, many stores were sold out of Jessie dolls. During the 1999 Christmas season, Jessie dolls were in high demand.

== Reception and legacy ==
Jessie has received a largely positive reception. Rolling Stone ranked Jessie as the fifth best Pixar movie character, highlighting Cusack’s "bubbly, fragile performance" and noting that in her song "When She Loved Me", she epitomizes the end of childhood. Psychologists Alan M. Schwitzer and Lawrence C. Rubin described Jessie's arc in Toy Story 2 as "a poignant story of abandonment, loss, and reconnection." Gwen Ihnat of The A.V. Club summarized Jessie's abandonment by her owner as "gut-wrenching" and a "sobfest", commenting that parents would especially feel the emotional impact of the loss of childhood innocence. She felt that the scene "elevated the movie from an adventurous romp...to a meditation on the losses associated with growing up". Peter Bradshaw writing for The Guardian opined that Jessie's abandonment story is really about a parent's fear of their child growing up and becoming independent: "a part of you will wind up, like cowgirl Jessie, left under the child's bed, forgotten". Christine Seghers of IGN praised Toy Story of Terror! for putting Jessie in a position where she must face up to her fears of abandonment and claustrophobia and is empowered to overcome them.

In a review of Toy Story 2, Roger Ebert described Jessie as "spunky" and "liberated", commenting that "she brings new life to the cast by confronting the others for the first time with a female character who's a little less domestic than Mrs. Potato Head". Tim Luisi cited Jessie as a turning point in the Toy Story franchise's gendered representations of support and described her as the franchise's first female character who was as important as the male characters. Jessie has been described as a "strong, independent and assertive female character", though Lilian Munk Rösing described this strength as "boyish" and "manic". Matthew Wilkinson of Screen Rant, ranking her as the best supporting character in Toy Story, stated, "Jessie really brought the girl power into the franchise in a big way." Angie Han of SlashFilm listed Jessie as one of the best Pixar female characters, praising Pixar for dwelling on her emotional scars. In a Mic article looking at female representation in Pixar films, Anna Swartz said that Jessie is possibly, "the most substantive female character Pixar introduced up to this point", noting her traumatic backstory, but highlighted that it is Woody and Buzz that are clearly placed as the stars of Toy Story 2.

Body+Souls writer Courtney Thompson felt that Jessie was not the feminist hero she could have been, commenting that despite being "adventurous, independent and funny", she is restricted to a sexist romance plot: "Jessie was an opportunity for Pixar to give young girls someone to look up to without having her pander to men at all." Conversely, her developing relationship with Buzz Lightyear received positive commentary from Sara Martin Alegre, who said that it could be considered a subversion of the dominant male romance trope due to the "healthy and consensual feelings that Buzz and Jessie bear for one another". Ella Alexander of Harper's Bazaar noted that in Toy Story 3, Jessie is pushed to the background except for her scenes involving her romance with Buzz Lightyear, while in Toy Story 4, she is again given a minor supporting role in favor of Bo Peep: "It is, for Pixar at least, too much of a stretch to feature two women in key roles." Steve Rose of The Guardian also discussed Pixar's treatment of its female characters by listing Jessie as one of several characters alongside Dory and Mrs Incredible that take second billing to the male characters in Pixar films: "at worst they're token love-interests, stay-at-home mums and other stereotypes bent on spoiling the boys' party". Angelica Florio writing for Bustle described Jessie as a "feminist icon", despite noting that Toy Story 2 features no female interactions with other female characters, thereby failing the Bechdel test. Time writer Stephanie Zacharek noted the significance of Woody handing over his sheriff badge to Jessie in Toy Story 4, commenting, "the reign of the white man is coming to an end".

Cusack received praise for her voice work as Jessie. Marc Snetiker of Entertainment Weekly remarked on her "fizz-pop-crackle twang" and considered Jessie to be "one of the most fully realized and precisely layered characters on Pixar’s roster". Simon Kinnear of GamesRadar+ listed Jessie as one of the greatest female characters in film stating, "Cusack nails Jessie's central dichotomy of a personality branded by manufacturers to be bubbly but driven by reality to be desperately sad". MovieWeb writer Katey Hicks ranked Jessie as Cusack's best performance commenting that she creates a convincing and heartbreaking portrayal of the character. Cusack also won the category for Female Voice Acting in a Feature Production at the 2000 Annie Awards for her voice work as Jessie in Toy Story 2. Jessie also received the Patsy Montana Entertainer Award from the National Cowgirl Museum and Hall of Fame.
