= Toy Story 5 =

2026 film by Andrew Stanton

- Theatrical release poster
- Directed by: Andrew Stanton
- Screenplay by: Andrew Stanton; Kenna Harris
- Story by: Andrew Stanton
- Produced by: Lindsey Collins; Jessica Choi (Note: Choi is given a "producer" credit in the end crawl for the film, before the Cast credits. Lindsey Collins retains sole "produced by" credit in the film marketing material.)
- Starring: Joan Cusack; Tom Hanks; Tim Allen; Conan O'Brien; Scarlett Spears; Greta Lee; Shelby Rabara; Mykal-Michelle Harris; Craig Robinson
- Cinematography: Matt Aspbury; Jean-Claude Kalache
- Edited by: Jennifer Jew
- Music by: Randy Newman
- Production company: Pixar Animation Studios
- Distributed by: Walt Disney Studios; Motion Pictures (Note: Distributed under the Walt Disney Pictures banner)
- Release dates: June 9, 2026 (Los Angeles); June 19, 2026 (United States)
- Running time: 102 minutes
- Country: United States
- Language: English
- Budget: $250 million
- Box office: $1.15 billion

Toy Story 5 is a 2026 American animated comedy-drama film directed by Andrew Stanton, written by Stanton and Kenna Harris, and produced by Pixar Animation Studios for Walt Disney Pictures. Tom Hanks, Tim Allen, and Joan Cusack reprise their voice roles, joined by Conan O'Brien, Scarlett Spears, Greta Lee, Shelby Rabara, Mykal-Michelle Harris, and Craig Robinson. Set two years after Toy Story 4 (2019), it follows Jessie as she, Woody, Buzz Lightyear and the other toys deal with the presence of Lilypad, a tablet and Bonnie's new favorite plaything.

Development was confirmed in February 2023, with Hanks and Allen returning. Stanton, who co-wrote the previous Toy Story films, was confirmed as the director in June 2024. It is the first main Toy Story film with no involvement from the co-creator John Lasseter following his departure from Pixar in 2018. It was the tenth Pixar film scored by Randy Newman, while Taylor Swift contributed the single "I Knew It, I Knew You". With a budget of $250 million, Toy Story 5 is one of the most expensive animated films and one of the most expensive films of all time.

Toy Story 5 premiered in Los Angeles on June 9, 2026, and was theatrically released in the United States on June 19. It grossed $1.15 billion worldwide, breaking various box office records and becoming Pixar's biggest worldwide opening weekend. It is the third-highest-grossing film of 2026, the highest of the franchise, and the tenth highest-grossing animated film. Like its predecessors, it received positive reviews from critics, who praised its visuals, performances, humor, and themes, although some criticized its script.

== Plot ==
An ocean container filled with a unit of hi-tech edition Buzz Lightyear toys shipwrecks on a deserted island. Stuck in demo mode, the shipwrecked Buzzes escape the island and follow the North Star to return to "Star Command".

Eight-year-old Bonnie receives a frog-themed tablet named Lilypad ("Lily") from her parents in hopes of helping her socialize with children her own age. Bonnie soon becomes addicted to Lily and begins to neglect her toys. Jessie, as Bonnie's favorite and the new leader of her toys, explains to Lily about Bonnie's need for a real friend, which Lily attempts to solve by sending a friend request to Chelsea, one of Bonnie's classmates, on social media.

Fearful of losing Bonnie's affection, Jessie contacts Woody via a walkie-talkie for advice. Woody, who has left to help Bo Peep find homes for abandoned toys, (Note: As depicted in Toy Story 4 (2019)) decides to return to Bonnie, believing that Jessie needs help. When Chelsea invites Bonnie over for a sleepover, Jessie and Bullseye stow away in her suitcase while Bonnie takes Lily with her. Though she is initially happy to have them, Bonnie has her father take Jessie and Bullseye home after Chelsea, alongside her friends Heidi and Kara, question Bonnie for still playing with toys. Jessie and Bullseye escape but are found by an elderly couple. Seeing an old address written under Jessie's chaps, the couple takes the two back to the farmhouse of her original owner, Emily.

There, Jessie ends up in a Wendy house of forgotten toys, including a potty-training device toy named Smarty Pants. As they enter the house searching for Bullseye, Jessie meets GPS receiver Atlas and camera Snappy. They inform her that a new family, the Manoukians—consisting of a young girl named Blaze and her parents—now inhabit the farmhouse. After experiencing a joyful playtime with an imaginative Blaze, Jessie decides to have her meet Bonnie and help them become friends.

Woody reunites with Bonnie's toys, and they confront Lily about Jessie's whereabouts. Believing the toys are hindering Bonnie's social life, Lily tricks Bonnie's father into putting them in storage while Woody and Buzz escape. At the farmhouse, Jessie works with the device toys to send a picture of herself to Bonnie in Blaze's name. Seeing this on social media, the Buzz units believe Jessie is the leader of Star Command due to her sheriff badge. Woody and Buzz hitch a ride with Bonnie and her mother as they go to the Manoukians' house. On the way, Bonnie reads a group chat in which Chelsea, Heidi, and Kara ridicule her over the picture. As a result, Bonnie rejects Blaze's offer to return Jessie and Bullseye, disassociating herself from the toys.

The Buzz units capture Woody, suspecting he means Jessie harm, but Buzz clarifies matters. Jessie sulks by a tree where Emily used to play with her. She discovers a buried time capsule filled with late-20th-century objects alongside photos of an adult Emily and her daughter, who is named after Jessie. Realizing that she still had an impact on Emily's life over the years, Jessie regains her faith in Bonnie. With the Buzz units' help, along with the device toys, Jessie tracks down Lily, who boarded a donation truck out of guilt for hurting Bonnie. Jessie and the others catch up with the truck and convince Lily to help Bonnie befriend Blaze. Buzz professes his love for Jessie and they kiss.

The toys and devices arrange a new meeting between Bonnie and Blaze. After some hesitation, they bond over their love of toys. They play together with all of Bonnie's toys and pretend to marry Jessie and Buzz, with Woody happily watching before he departs with Bo. Each of the Buzz units are later taken in by various children at a school playground.

== Voice cast ==
- Tom Hanks as Woody
- Tim Allen as:
  - Buzz Lightyear
  - The Multi-Buzz, a group of 50 high-tech Buzz Lightyear units stuck in demo mode.
- Joan Cusack as Jessie
- Greta Lee as Lilypad "Lily", a frog-themed tablet who becomes Bonnie's new favorite plaything.
- Conan O'Brien as Smarty Pants, a toilet training toy.
- Scarlett Spears as Bonnie Anderson. Spears replaces Emily Hahn and Madeleine McGraw, who voiced Bonnie in the third and fourth films, respectively.
- Mykal-Michelle Harris as Blaze Manoukian, a farm girl who loves animals and has a collection of horse toys
- Shelby Rabara as Snappy, an excitable toy camera
- Craig Robinson as Atlas, a cheerful talking GPS hippopotamus toy
- Krys Marshall as Mrs. Manoukian, Blaze's mother
- Matty Matheson as Dr. Nutcase, a daredevil peanut toy who fears tech and is rescued from a squirrel by Woody
- Alan Cumming as Evil Bullseye, an evil version of Bullseye who appears in Blaze's imagination during playtime.

Also reprising their roles from the previous Toy Story films are Annie Potts as Bo Peep, Keanu Reeves as Duke Caboom, Bonnie Hunt as Dolly, Kristen Schaal as Trixie, Tony Hale as Forky, Wallace Shawn as Rex, Lori Alan as Mrs. Anderson, Jay Hernandez as Mr. Anderson, Blake Clark as Slinky Dog, John Ratzenberger as Hamm, and Melissa Villaseñor as Karen Beverly. Director Andrew Stanton briefly reprises his role as Emperor Zurg from the second film in a cameo appearance despite being listed under the "additional voices".

Among returning characters voiced by new actors, Jeff Bergman and Anna Vocino respectively replace Don Rickles and Estelle Harris, who died in 2017 and 2022, as Mr. and Mrs. Potato Head; John Hopkins replaces Timothy Dalton from the last two films and Robin Atkin Downes from Forky Asks a Question as Mr. Pricklepants; and Ernie Hudson replaces Carl Weathers, who died in 2024, as Combat Carl.

Additionally, Jerome Ranft, Tyla, and Benito Antonio Martínez Ocasio respectively voice a Garden Gnome, Inflatable Flamingo, and Pizza with Sunglasses seen amongst Blaze's abandoned toys; Capital Breakfast presenters Jordan North and Siân Welby respectively voice the Garden Gnome and Inflatable Flamingo in the UK version, while Australian DJ Fisher voices the Gnome in the Australian and New Zealand version.

== Production ==
=== Development ===
In May 2019, producer Mark Nielsen said Pixar was returning its focus to making original films instead of sequels after Toy Story 4 for a while. On the May 22, 2019 episode of The Ellen DeGeneres Show, Tom Hanks, the voice of Woody, stated that the fourth main film was the final film in the series. He said Tim Allen, the voice of Buzz Lightyear, had "warned him about the emotional final goodbye between their characters Woody and Buzz Lightyear in Toy Story 4." However, Nielsen did not rule out the possibility of a fifth main film and said later that month, "Every film we make, we treat it like it's the first and the last film we're ever going to make, so you force yourself to make it hold up. You don't get in over your skis. Whether there's another one? I don't know. If there is, it's tomorrow's problem."

In February 2023, Disney CEO Bob Iger confirmed that a fifth main Toy Story film was in active development. It would be the first in the series without any involvement from co-creator John Lasseter, who left Pixar during the production of Toy Story 4 in late 2018. In June 2023, Pixar's chief creative officer Pete Docter confirmed Woody's return. The following year, Docter named Andrew Stanton, who co-wrote the first four films, to be the director of Toy Story 5, and Kenna Harris as the co-director. At the D23 event in August 2024, Docter announced Stanton's writing contributions in addition to his directorial effort.

=== Animation ===
The playtime sequences are presented in a stylized pastel art style to reflect that of Bonnie's imagination.

Pixar used a new version of its rendering software, RenderMan XPU, for the first time on a feature film. XPU, a new renderer that can use both CPUs and GPUs concurrently, enabled artists to see "nine times faster speeds for interactive, full-frame rendering". The Luna extension for Presto, Pixar's core 3D animation system, was first used in Pixar's previous film, Hoppers, and expanded for Toy Story 5. Luna allowed lighting artists to work across multiple shots at once. For instance, if the position of the sun was moved in one shot, the effect was immediately replicated across a grid of shots.

Daffodil, a horse character, took more than a year to build, rig and simulate. Pixar brought a real horse to its campus for animators to study and developed a new animation technology they called "invertible rigging". Pixar CTO Steve May explained, "The idea is that you can do direct manipulation, inverse and forward kinematics, with every control in the character. You can bend a finger or pull it, move the hand, then pull the elbow and shoulder with it, solve the way feet make contact with the ground and make the ankles roll. Riggers no longer need to build unique controls for special manipulation."

The playtime sequences — a longtime staple of the franchise — are portrayed in a painterly art style to reflect Bonnie's imagination rather than the franchise's stylized photorealistic look. Pixar effects technical director Ravindra Dwivedi explained in an interview with IGN that this was a creative choice by the team: "This time, we had never seen Bonnie's playtime, so it was really an opportunity to have fun with it."

Visual effects supervisor Thomas Jordan said the system developed for Blaze's hair enabled greater diversity in future Pixar films. Co-director Kenna Harris said animators relied on Black colleagues' opinions to ensure Blaze's hair looked and behaved authentically in different scenes. By June 2026, Variety reported that Toy Story 5 had a $250 million production budget.

=== Casting and recording ===
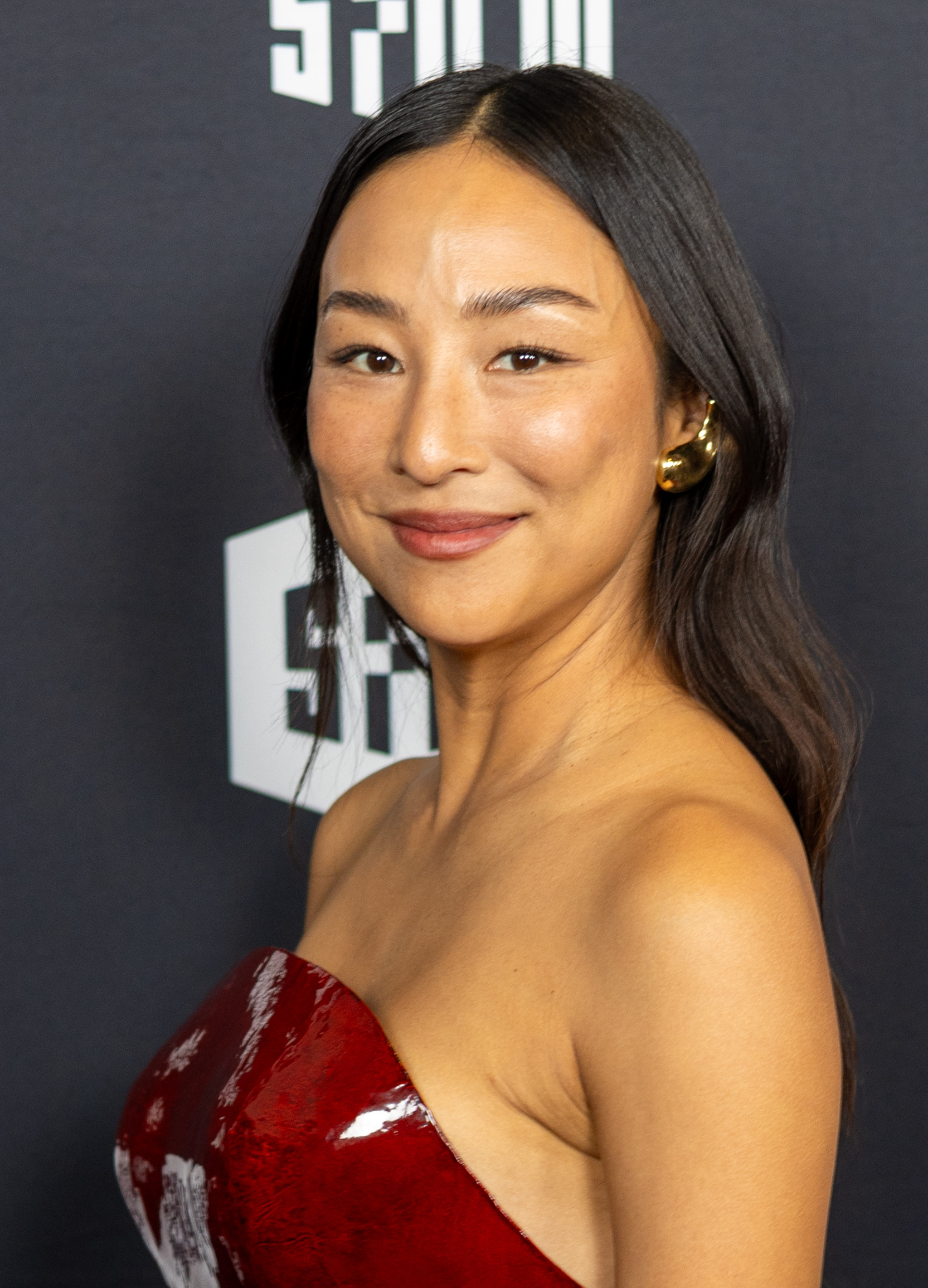
Greta Lee joined the cast as Lilypad.

Shortly after Toy Story 5's announcement in February 2023, Allen confirmed he was returning to voice Buzz Lightyear. In September, Tom Hanks' brother Jim Hanks confirmed his brother's return as the voice of Woody. Allen revealed in mid-December 2024 that he had begun recording his dialogue and said that the story was "really good". In January 2025, it was reported that Anna Faris was cast in an undisclosed role. In April, Ernie Hudson was announced to be voicing Combat Carl, taking over the role from the late Carl Weathers. Later that month, Hanks revealed that he had begun recording his lines. In May, Conan O'Brien joined the cast as a new character named Smarty Pants, with Joan Cusack returning to voice Jessie. She was verified the following month. In August, Tony Hale confirmed his return as Forky from Toy Story 4, having recorded dialogue in July. Later that month, it was reported Faris was voicing Lilypad. However, it was revealed on November 11, 2025, that Lilypad was instead being voiced by Greta Lee. Faris later denied her involvement. On November 21, 2025, Allen finished recording his lines.

=== Themes ===
Toy Story 5 deals with children increasingly eschewing traditional toys in favor of touchscreen devices like tablets. Jessie admits that she is "losing Bonnie to this device". Stanton explained that Toy Story 5 is a "realisation of an existential problem: that nobody's really playing with toys any more" and asks what increasing screen time means for children. The toys must confront what it means to stay relevant when technology reshapes playtime.

== Music ==
Randy Newman returned to score Toy Story 5, having previously composed the first four films. On June 1, 2026, Taylor Swift announced that she had contributed an original song, "I Knew It, I Knew You". Written and produced by Swift and Jack Antonoff, the single was released on June 5, 2026, and topped the US Billboard Hot 100, marking Disney's third and Pixar's first song to do so, and Swift's 15th. Swift wrote, produced, and presented the song to Disney CEO Bob Iger and Walt Disney Music president Tom MacDougall hours after attending an advance screening.

== Release ==
An airplane painted with Toy Story 5 livery

Toy Story 5 had its world premiere at the Dolby Theatre in Los Angeles on June 9, 2026, and was theatrically released in the United States by Walt Disney Studios Motion Pictures on June 19, in 4,425 theaters. It is the first mainline film in the Toy Story franchise to receive a PG rating from the Motion Picture Association for "some thematic elements and rude humor", and the second overall following Lightyear (2022).

=== Marketing ===
The opening scene was previewed at the Annecy International Animation Film Festival on June 13, 2025, and at Destination D23 on August 30, 2025, where Pete Docter described the log line as "Toy meets Tech". The teaser trailer was released in November 2025 and amassed 142 million views within 24 hours. Toy Story 5 had a red-carpet launch event at the Odeon Luxe Leicester Square in London on May 28, 2026.

In June 2026, Porsche unveiled three custom 911 cars themed after Woody, Buzz Lightyear, and Jessie. Each car will be placed on auction, with the proceeds going to the Big Brothers Big Sisters of America, the American Red Cross, and Starlight Children's Foundation.

=== Home media ===
Toy Story 5 was released by Walt Disney Studios Home Entertainment for digital purchase on August 18, 2026, and on Ultra HD Blu-ray, Blu-ray, and DVD on September 22, 2026. Its streaming debut for Disney+ was on September 23, 2026.

== Reception ==
=== Box office ===
Toy Story 5 grossed $480 million in the United States and Canada, and $669 million in other territories, for a worldwide total of $1.15 billion.

In the United States and Canada, Toy Story 5 made $71 million on its first day, including $17.5 million in Thursday previews. It went on to earn $159.7 million in the United States and Canada and $150.5 million from other territories during its opening weekend, adding up to a total of $310.2 million globally. This global weekend debut became both the highest in the Toy Story franchise's and Pixar's history. It surpassed Toy Story 4 and Inside Out 2 (2024), which made $244.5 million and $294.2 million globally during their opening weekends, respectively. Additionally, it beat The Super Mario Galaxy Movie to have the year's biggest opening weekend and achieved the third-highest June opening weekend, only behind Jurassic World (2015) and Incredibles 2 (2018). In its second weekend, it grossed $70 million (a drop of 56%) to finish first, beating new release Supergirl. During the third weekend, Toy Story 5 dropped another 56%, grossing $31 million, to finish second behind Minions & Monsters, and 39% in its fourth to gross $18.5 million.

=== Critical response ===
Toy Story 5 received positive reviews from critics, with praise for its visuals, voice performances, humor and themes, while criticism was directed at its script. On review aggregation website Rotten Tomatoes, Toy Story 5 has an approval rating of 92% based on 332 reviews, with an average rating of 7.8/10. The site's critical consensus reads, "Proving that old toys can learn new tricks while reckoning with an era of endless screen time, Toy Story 5 largely sidesteps franchise fatigue by reaffirming that children everywhere still got a friend in these lovable characters." Metacritic, which assigns a normalized rating to reviews, gave it a score of 73 out of 100 based on 55 critics, indicating "generally favorable reviews". Audiences polled by CinemaScore gave it an average grade of "A" on an A+ to F scale, the same grade as most of its predecessors.

David Ehrlich of IndieWire gave Toy Story 5 B+, but wrote it was "often scattered to a degree that leaves even its central plot somewhat undercooked" and "adding another 30 or so characters to it in one fell swoop." Owen Gleiberman of Variety compared the five Toy Story films to the catalog of the Beatles, arguing that they worked together as a unified masterpiece. He described Toy Story 5 as the equivalent of the band's later-career triumph, praising it as a "sublime summing up" of everything the series has explored. Odie Henderson of The Boston Globe wrote that Toy Story 5 "wrings new life out of its lore by making this installment Jessie's journey", but did not follow through on its "initial thesis that technology has turned humankind into a bunch of cruel, narcissistic zombies who can't imagine life without a screen to stare at all day." Clint Gage of IGN wrote that Woody was not needed, but it "managed to pull off an adventurous and resonant conclusion". Peter Bradshaw of The Guardian gave Toy Story 5 two out of five, writing that the franchise "needs new batteries ... It is played out and IP exhaustion has set in."

=== Accolades ===
Accolades received by Toy Story 5
Award	Date of ceremony	Category	Recipient(s)	Result	Ref.
Astra Midseason Movie Awards	June 30, 2026	Best Picture	Toy Story 5	Nominated	
Astra Midseason Movie Awards	June 30, 2026	Best Screenplay	Andrew Stanton and Kenna Harris	Nominated	
Country Music Association Awards	November 18, 2026	Single of the Year	"I Knew It, I Knew You" – Taylor Swift (performer and producer); Jack Antonoff (producer); Laura Sisk (mix engineer)	Nominated	
Digital Spy Reader Awards	December 28, 2025	Most Anticipated Movie of 2026	Toy Story 5	Runner-up	
Golden Trailer Awards	May 28, 2026	Best Teaser	"Unpacking" (Walt Disney Studios and MOCEAN)	Nominated	
Grammy Awards	February 7, 2027	Song of the Year	"I Knew It, I Knew You" – Taylor Swift and Jack Antonoff	Pending	
Grammy Awards	February 7, 2027	Best Song Written for Visual Media	"I Knew It, I Knew You" – Taylor Swift and Jack Antonoff	Pending	
Hollywood Music in Media Awards	November 18, 2026	Best Original Score in an Animated Film	Randy Newman	Nominated	
Hollywood Music in Media Awards	November 18, 2026	Best Original Song in an Animated Film	"I Knew It, I Knew You" – Taylor Swift and Jack Antonoff	Won	
Kids' Choice Awards	November 14, 2026	Favorite Animated Movie	Toy Story 5	Nominated	
Kids' Choice Awards	November 14, 2026	Favorite Female Animated Voice from a Movie	Joan Cusack	Nominated	
Kids' Choice Awards	November 14, 2026	Favorite Male Animated Voice from a Movie	Tim Allen	Nominated	
Kids' Choice Awards	November 14, 2026	Favorite Male Animated Voice from a Movie	Tom Hanks	Nominated	
Kids' Choice Awards	November 14, 2026	Favorite On-Screen Duo or Trio	Joan Cusack, Tim Allen, and Tom Hanks	Nominated	
Kids' Choice Awards	November 14, 2026	Favorite Song from a Movie	"I Knew It, I Knew You" – Taylor Swift	Nominated	
MTV Video Music Awards	September 27, 2026	Song of Summer	"I Knew It, I Knew You" – Taylor Swift	Nominated	
Weibo Music Awards	September 23, 2026	Song of the Year – Foreign	"I Knew It, I Knew You" – Taylor Swift	Nominated	

== Future ==
At the premiere in June 2026, Stanton stated that Toy Story 3 (2010) was the "end of the Andy years", adding that they have "got another trilogy with Bonnie".
