= Toy Story: The Musical =

Musical

Toy Story:
- The Musical
- Logo
- Music: Valerie Vigoda; Brendan Milburn
- Lyrics: Valerie Vigoda; Brendan Milburn
- Book: Mindi Dickstein
- Basis: Toy Story by: Joss Whedon; Andrew Stanton; Joel Cohen; Alec Sokolow; John Lasseter; Pete Docter; Joe Ranft
- Productions: 2008–2016, Disney Wonder
- Awards: Music Awards

Toy Story: The Musical is a musical based on Disney·Pixar's 1995 animated film Toy Story. The show was created by Walt Disney Creative Entertainment for Disney Cruise Line, replacing the earlier Hercules: The Muse-Ical. After a year of pre-production and workshops, it had a soft premiere on board the Disney Wonder in March 2008, with an official opening on April 10, 2008. The show was performed in the Walt Disney Theatre, the grand showplace located on Deck 4.

A land debut was planned in the Hyperion Theater at Disney California Adventure, however the plans were later removed. The musical spectacular for Frozen replaced plans for Toy Story at the Hyperion Theater starting on May 27, 2016.

The show was directed by Los Angeles-based director, Stefan Novinski, and choreographed by New York-based choreographer, Warren Adams. Throughout the 55-minute musical, there are 6 original songs, written by Valerie Vigoda and Brendan Milburn. It also features one song from the original soundtrack of the animated feature, "You've Got a Friend in Me", written by Randy Newman. Music direction and arranging was handled by Los Angeles-based music director, David O. The book was written by New York-based lyricist, Mindi Dickstein, who penned the lyrics for the Little Women musical on Broadway. Sets were designed by Los Angeles-based set designer, Sibyl Wickersheimer, costumes were created by Los Angeles-based avant garde costumer, Ann Closs-Farley, lighting was designed by New York-based designer, Jason Kantrowitz, and sound design was by Los Angeles-based designer Drew Dalzell.

Toy Story: The Musical follows the film's storyline, with certain theatrical liberties taken.

== Order of musical numbers ==
1. "You've Got a Friend in Me 1" – Opening Scene
2. "That's Why We're Here 1" - Andy Davis Birthday
3. "To Infinity and Beyond" – Meet Buzz Lightyear
4. "One Toy" - Sheriff Woody Hate New Toys
5. "The Claw" – Pizza Planet
6. "Make a Little Noise 1" – Sid Philips Home
7. "Make a Little Noise 2" – Big One
8. "That's Why We're Here 2" – Sheriff Woody and Buzz Lightyear
9. "Make a Little Noise 3" - Sid Philips Make Blown Up Buzz Lightyear
10. "Busted"/"Make a Lot of Noise" – Sid Philips Defeat
11. "You've Got a Friend in Me 2"/"That's Why We're Here 3" – Ending Scene
12. "Bows"/"To Infinity and Beyond 2" – End Credits

== Casts ==
Character	Opening	Closing
Character	2008	2016
Woody	Geoffrey Tyler	Patrick Pevehouse
Buzz Lightyear	Noel Orput	Jeff Scot Carey
Andy	Robin Meijer	Keslie Ward
Rex	Mark Whitten; Wallace Shawn (voice)	Jason Clarke; Wallace Shawn (voice)
Slinky Dog	Nicholas Nunez & Gabi Epstein; Blake Clark (voice)	Mitch McCarrell & Dani Westhead; Blake Clark (voice)
Mr. Potato Head	Melany Carruthers; Don Rickles (voice)	Meghan Deeley; Don Rickles (voice)
Hamm	Ryan Naimy; John Ratzenberger (voice)	Michael Karl; John Ratzenberger (voice)
Bo Peep	Isabelle Kiraly	Ester Stilwell
Sarge	Andre Jordan	Chris Teusch & Jamari Williams
Mutant Army Man	Andre Jordan	Chris Teusch & Jamari Williams
Barrel of Monkeys	Laurel Hatfield, Jessica Vandenberg & Andrew Wilson	Mia Beasley, Andy Mills & Keslie Ward
Green Army Men	Ina Marie Smith & Todd Stroik	Kelsey Self & Andy Christopher
Buzz with Leaves	Katy Reinsel	Jacki King
Ducky	Katy Reinsel	Jacki King
Little Green Aliens	Andre Jordan, Isabelle Kiraly, Ina Marie Smith, Jessica Vandenberg & Andrew Wilson; Jeff Pidgeon (voice)	Kelsey Self, Andy Mills, Mia Beasley & Ester Stilwell; Jeff Pidgeon (voice)
Sid	Rachel Fischer	Melanie Burg
Ptero-Janie	Ina Marie Smith	Kelsey Self
Rollerbob	Laurel Hatfield	Keslie Ward
Babyhead	Todd Stroik	Andy Cristopher
Legs	Jessica Vandenberg	Mia Beasley
Manhand	Andrew Wilson	Andy Mills
