= Woody (Toy Story) =

Character in the Toy Story franchise

- Toy Story character
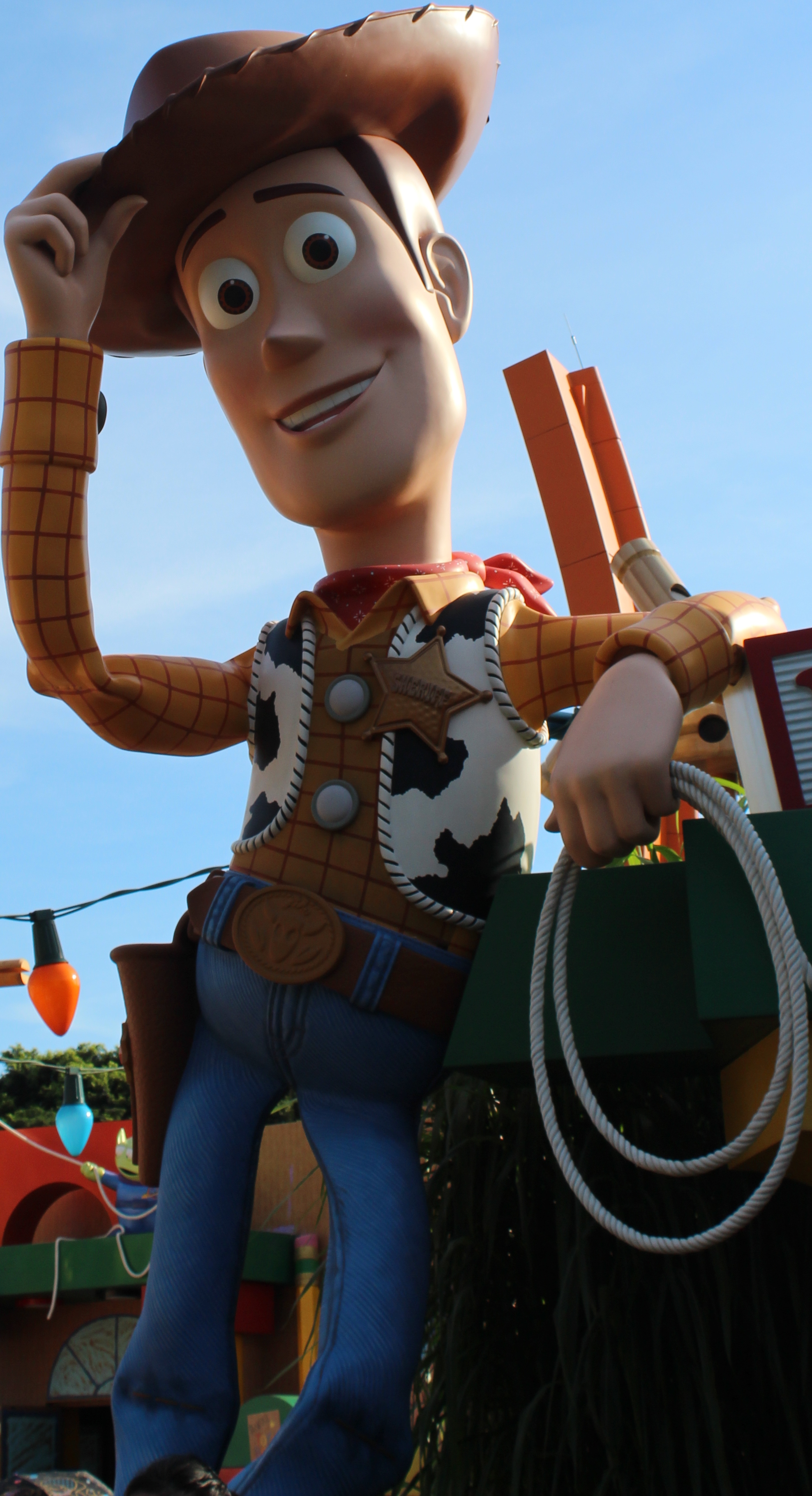
- Woody statue at Toy Story Land, Hong Kong
- First appearance: Toy Story (1995)
- Created by: John Lasseter; Andrew Stanton; Pete Docter; Joe Ranft
- Based on: Howdy Doody puppets; Casper the Friendly Ghost doll
- Designed by: Bud Luckey
- Voiced by: Tom Hanks; Jim Hanks

In-universe information
- Full name: Woody Pride
- Species: Pullstring doll
- Title(s): Sheriff; Cowboy
- Significant other: Bo Peep
- Relatives: Jessie (sister in Woody's Roundup)
- Gender: Male

Sheriff Woody Pride (or simply Woody) is a pull-string cowboy doll who appears in the Disney–Pixar Toy Story franchise. In the films, Woody is one of the main protagonists, alongside Buzz Lightyear, Jessie, Bo Peep, and Bullseye. He is primarily voiced by Tom Hanks, who voices him in the Toy Story films, short films, and TV specials. Hanks's brother, Jim Hanks, voices him in video games, attractions, and other merchandise.

Woody was created by directors and writers John Lasseter, Andrew Stanton, Pete Docter, and Joe Ranft. His facial features are based on the former Disney animator Tone Thyne. Woody was designed by Bud Luckey, and is based on John Lasseter's Casper pull-string doll he had as a kid, as well as the Howdy Doody puppets from the 1950s show. In August 2009, Toy Story 3 director Lee Unkrich stated in his Twitter feed that Woody's last name is Pride and has been since the making of the original movie.

In the first film, Woody is Andy Davis's favorite toy and is the leader of Andy's toys. When Andy gets a new toy called Buzz Lightyear, Woody feels his position is jeopardized, but the two later become friends. In the second film, he figures out he used to be in a popular TV show called Woody's Roundup alongside other three toys and is asked to stay with the group, but he decides to stay with Andy's toys; all but one member of the group also join the reform party. In the third film, Andy leaves to go to college so he decides to give his toys to a little girl named Bonnie Anderson; he had initially planned to take Woody to college, before seeing that Bonnie loved him. In the fourth, Bonnie's family decides to go on a vacation and Woody finds his long-lost girlfriend, Bo Peep. He decides to leave his fellow toys and Bonnie behind and go with Bo Peep to help lost toys find new owners. He returns in the fifth film in a supporting role to help his fellow toys avoid being forgotten by Bonnie during a crisis. Since his debut, Woody has received largely positive reception from reviewers due to his character's arc and personality, as well as Tom Hanks's vocal performance.

== Development ==
Concept art of Woody's original design as an evil ventriloquist dummy, which was scrapped due to negative feedback

Steve Jobs, founder and former owner of Pixar, made a deal with Disney, under chairman Jeffrey Katzenberg, to collaborate on the film Toy Story, set to be the first feature-length computer-animated film. The original draft for the film Toy Story, by Pixar animators John Lasseter, Andrew Stanton, and Pete Docter, had almost nothing to do with the eventually finished film. It had Tinny, the one-man band from Tin Toy, as the main character and Woody as an evil ventriloquist dummy. Woody would be the main villain, abusing the other toys until they rallied against him. After Disney executives saw the draft, they sent negative feedback about it and production on the movie was shut down, until a better draft could be revised. Tom Hanks, the primary voice of Woody, was unhappy with the character and reportedly shouted "This guy is a jerk!" while recording lines for the story reel. Katzenberg thought the original draft for Toy Story was bad and told Lasseter to redo it, making it more of an odd-couple buddy picture, where the characters Tinny and Woody would be forced to bond with each other despite their different characteristics.

After the negative feedback, Lasseter, Stanton, and Docter got together in early September 1991 with the second draft of the film, and although the lead characters were still Tinny and the dummy, the outline of the final film was beginning to take shape. The Pixar team came back with a new script three months later, with the character of Woody altered from being the tyrannical boss of Andy's toys to being their wise and caring leader.

Woody was inspired by a Casper the Friendly Ghost doll that Lasseter had when he was a kid and the puppets from the children's television show Howdy Doody. They based his facial features on Disney animator Tone Thyne. Woody stayed a ventriloquist's dummy with a pull-string (hence the name Woody), until his character designer, Bud Luckey, suggested that Woody could be changed to a cowboy ventriloquist dummy. Lasseter liked the difference between the western and the science fiction genres, so Woody was instantly changed. Eventually, all the ventriloquist dummy features of Woody were deleted as the dummy looked "sneaky and mean". However, they kept the name Woody in homage to the American singer and fiddler Woody Paul. In August 2009, Lee Unkrich, Toy Story 3 director, stated on his Twitter feed that Woody's last name is Pride and has been since earliest days of development.

=== Voice ===
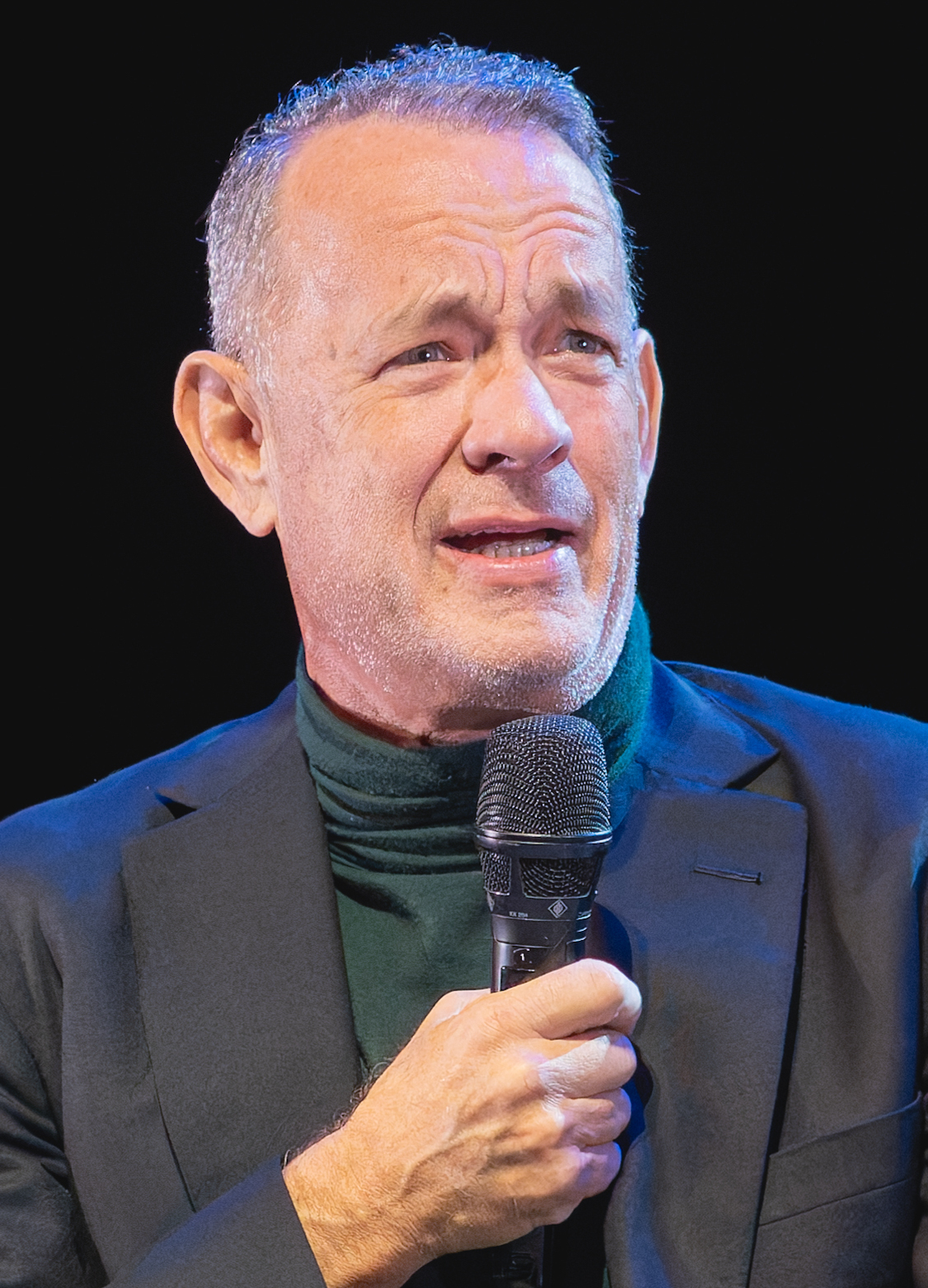
Tom Hanks (in 2023), Woody's primary voice actor

Paul Newman, Robin Williams, and Clint Eastwood were all considered for the voice of Woody, but John Lasseter always wanted Tom Hanks to voice Woody, stating that Hanks "has the ability to take emotions and make them appealing. Even if the character, like the one in A League of Their Own, is down-and-out and despicable." To see how Hanks's voice might fit with Woody, Lasseter borrowed a common Disney technique: animate a vocal monologue from a well-established actor to meld the actor's voice with the appearance or actions of the animated character. The early test footage of using Hanks's voice from Turner & Hooch convinced Hanks to sign on to the film. At Hanks's suggestion, Pixar employed his brother Jim Hanks to perform Woody's voice for video games, toys, attractions, and other merchandise.

== Characteristics ==
Woody is an old-fashioned floppy pull-string cowboy doll. The voice-box that is activated by the pull-string says many simple phrases such as "Reach for the sky!", "You're my favorite deputy!", "There's a snake in my boot!", and "Somebody's poisoned the waterhole!". (Note: As seen in Toy Story, Toy Story 2, Toy Story 3, and Toy Story 4) His construction includes an "original hand-painted face, natural dyed-blanket stitched vest", and "hand-stitched poly-vinyl hat". Woody also wears an empty gun holster at his belt. (Note: As mentioned in Toy Story 2)

He has been Andy's favorite toy since kindergarten, with a special spot on the bed, and is the leader and the brains of the toys in Andy's room. Andrew Stanton said that he understood that Woody would need to be a lovable yet flawed leader since he is somewhat selfish. In Toy Story 2, it was revealed that he starred as the main character from a popular 1950s TV show Woody's Roundup. When Al is bargaining with Andy's mom in an attempt to take Woody, Andy's mom declines, stating that Woody is "an old family toy." Prospector also directly and derogatorily refers to him as a "hand-me-down cowboy doll" later in the movie. John Lasseter said "we always thought" that Woody is "kind of a hand-me-down" to Andy from his father.

In the mock outtakes of Toy Story 2, Woody is shown to have a more mischievous side by pulling pranks on Buzz Lightyear, which includes drawing on his helmet and wings, and hiding in a Buzz Lightyear cardboard box to make faces as he walks past the hundreds of Buzz Lightyear toys on the shelves.

== Appearances ==
=== Toy Story films ===
==== Toy Story (1995) ====
Woody is the favorite toy of his owner Andy Davis and is the leader of the toys in Andy's room. However, his position is jeopardized by the arrival of Buzz Lightyear, an astronaut action figure that Andy got as a birthday present. Buzz is convinced that he is an actual Space Ranger instead of a toy. The other toys quickly come to like him more than Woody. Annoyed and jealous, Woody tries to knock Buzz behind a desk, in hopes of retaining his status as Andy's favorite toy, but accidentally knocks Buzz out an open window. The other toys (except for Bo Peep and Slinky Dog) accuse Woody of getting rid of Buzz on purpose. Woody tries to explain that it was just an accident, but the toys (again, except for Bo and Slinky) do not believe him and become more antagonistic towards him (especially Mr. Potato Head and Hamm the Piggy Bank). This ultimately led to Woody's exile.

While on the way to Pizza Planet, a fight between Woody and Buzz separates them from Andy at a gas station, which leads to them to being captured by Sid Phillips, Andy's malicious neighbor who likes to destroy toys for fun. While at Sid's house, Woody unsuccessfully tries to return to Andy's house after the other toys think he murdered Buzz; therefore, refusing to help Woody and severing ties with him. During a storm, Woody finally acknowledges how selfish he was in the past for letting his jealousy get the better of him while Buzz becomes depressed after realizing that he is really an action figure, but Woody cheers him up by explaining how happy he made Andy and convinces him to accept his role as a toy due to how popular he is. They work together to escape Sid's house and eventually reunite with Andy as he and his family move to a new house. Woody is also re-accepted among the other toys after they realized that he was telling the truth and isn't a murderer after all once they saw that Buzz is alive and well (yet, the other toys, mostly Mr. Potato Head, still feel guilty for their needless mutinies towards Woody despite making amends with him), and forms a strong friendship with Buzz.

==== Toy Story 2 (1999) ====
While Woody is trying to save another toy from being sold at Andy's family yard sale, Al McWhiggin, a toy collector, spots Woody and steals him to bring him to his apartment. At Al's apartment, Woody discovers his past and legacy as the star of a 1957 Western children's show titled Woody's Roundup. It starred Stinky Pete the Prospector, Jessie the Cowgirl, and Woody's horse Bullseye. Woody learns that he and the other Roundup toys are going to be shipped to Japan by Al to be displayed in a toy museum, which will only accept the collection if Woody is in it.

Prospector is intent to make sure that the Roundup toys get into the museum; he convinces Woody to go along to Japan and forget Andy. Buzz and a few of the toys arrive to rescue Woody, who changes his mind and decides to return home. However, Prospector prevents Woody from leaving the apartment, ultimately leading to a confrontation at the airport, where the Prospector's plan is foiled. Woody, Buzz, and the other toys return to Andy's house, bringing Jessie and Bullseye with them.

==== Toy Story 3 (2010) ====
Andy is now 17 years old, and is preparing to leave for college. When Andy's other toys mistakenly believe that they are being thrown out as trash, they decide to donate themselves to the Sunnyside Daycare Center. While the others chose to stay at the daycare, Woody attempts to return to Andy, but instead is found and taken home by a little girl named Bonnie, who attends Sunnyside. At Bonnie's house, Woody becomes friends with her toys, who are horrified that he came from Sunnyside and tell him about the true nature of the daycare.

Woody returns to the daycare to tell the other toys the true story of Sunnyside, but finds that Andy's toys are being imprisoned during the night by the daycare toys' bitter leader, Lotso. During the day Woody gathers Andy's toys and tries to devise a plan to help them escape the daycare at night. The plan works out until Lotso figures out where they are and confronts them near the daycare's dumpster. During the confrontation, they all end up inside the dumpster and are taken to a landfill by the nearby dump truck. Andy's toys escape from the fiery landfill, when the toy aliens use the giant claw inside the landfill to grab them and take them to a safe spot. The toys return to Andy's house, and Woody arranges for the toys to be donated to Bonnie's house to enjoy life with a new owner. Andy describes to Bonnie how he viewed his old toys and states that Woody is his favorite toy because he is loyal and will never give up on anyone.

==== Toy Story 4 (2019) ====
By the events of Toy Story 3, Woody is struggling to adapt to life with Bonnie, as he is no longer the leader of the group (Dolly is the leader of Bonnie's toys); furthermore, Bonnie has lost interest in him. Later, Bonnie creates a new toy, Forky, who believes himself to be trash because his body consists primarily of a disposable spork. Woody tries repeatedly to keep Forky from throwing himself away. In one instance, the two become separated from Bonnie and the other toys while on vacation. While trying to reunite with Bonnie, Woody teaches Forky the joys and responsibilities of being a toy. Woody later encounters Bo Peep, who has lived on her own for years without an owner, after being sold by Andy's mother nine years earlier.

Woody and Bo later team up to rescue Forky from a doll named Gabby Gabby, who wants Woody's voice box in return for Forky's release. Bo and Woody get into an argument after their rescue plan fails, with Woody telling Bo that loyalty is something a lost toy would not understand. He then agrees to give up his voice box after realizing Gabby Gabby had lived life as an unwanted toy due to her own defective voice box. After Buzz assures Woody that Bonnie will be okay without him, Woody and Bo reconcile and decide to stay together. After saying goodbye to their friends, Woody and Bo go on to help lost toys find new homes.

==== Toy Story 5 (2026) ====
Woody returns to Bonnie's household after Jessie contacts him about Bonnie's increasing attachment to a tablet computer named Lilypad and the neglect of her toys and he divulges how he and Bo Peep have been helping find homes for abandoned toys. After reuniting with Bonnie's toys, Woody becomes involved in countering Lily's influence over Bonnie. When Lily arranges for Bonnie's toys to be placed in storage, Woody escapes with Buzz. Later, the two exploit Lily's speech-recognition vulnerability to trigger the display of information that reveals Jessie's location.

Woody accompanies Bonnie and her mother to the Manoukian farmhouse, where Jessie has been staying, and is present when Bonnie initially refuses to take Jessie back due to peer ridicule. At the farmhouse, Woody helps coordinate the search for Jessie and Bullseye alongside Buzz and local device-based toys. He remains involved as Jessie regains confidence after reflecting on her past with Emily.

Following Lily's departure on a donation truck, Woody joins the pursuit and helps convince her to assist rather than interfere with Bonnie's relationships. He and Bo later participate in arranging the meeting between Bonnie and Blaze, and watch from a distance during their shared imaginative play before departing for their own adventures.

=== Other appearances ===
Woody appears in the animated mock outtakes of A Bug's Life as the clapperboard holder. (Note: As seen in the end credits of A Bug's Life) He also appears in the Andy's room sequence of Buzz Lightyear of Star Command: The Adventure Begins where he is voiced by Jim Hanks. Later, he appears in the end credit epilogue of Pixar's 2006 movie Cars as a toy station wagon voiced by Tom Hanks. He also appears in the three Toy Story Toons shorts Hawaiian Vacation, Small Fry, and Partysaurus Rex, which were released from 2011 to 2012. He is also featured in the television specials Toy Story of Terror! (2013) and Toy Story That Time Forgot (2014). Woody, voiced by Jim Hanks, appears in a show called Toy Story Treats, as well as the Disney+ short Lamp Life.

=== Miscellaneous ===
==== Theme parks ====
Woody appears in all the Walt Disney Parks and Resorts. He can be met through meet and greets at all four Toy Story Lands, which are at France's Walt Disney Studios Park (Toy Story Playland), Hong Kong Disneyland, Shanghai Disneyland, and Walt Disney World's Hollywood Studios. A twenty-feet-tall statue of Woody can be seen at the entrance of Hollywood Studios and Hong Kong Disneyland's Toy Story Land. There is also one restaurant and an upcoming restaurant both named after him called Woody's Lunch Box and Woody's Roundup Rodeo BBQ. At Shanghai's Toy Story Land, there is a ride called Woody's Roundup. At Hollywood Studios, Disneyland, and Tokyo DisneySea, Woody is featured in a 4D shooting arcade ride called Toy Story Mania!.

At the Magic Kingdom, Woody can be seen on a parade float in the Move It! Shake It! Dance and Play It! Street Party parade. There is also an entire section of Disney's All-Star Movies Resort dedicated to Toy Story that includes a statue of Woody. After twenty-five years of the same character look, Woody and some other Toy Story characters got an update to their look at Hong Kong Disneyland when it reopened in 2021. Woody received a new outfit, updated facial details, and the overall height and proportion of his character was edited.

==== Toy Story: The Musical ====
Woody appeared in the rock musical Toy Story: The Musical. The musical, based on the movie, was created by Walt Disney Creative Entertainment for Disney Cruise Line, and made its first appearance on the Disney Wonder on April 10, 2008, and closed on May 7, 2016. Woody was originally portrayed by Geoffrey Tyler and was later portrayed by Patrick Pevehouse. The musical follows the storyline of the original movie with a few differences.

==== Disney on Ice ====
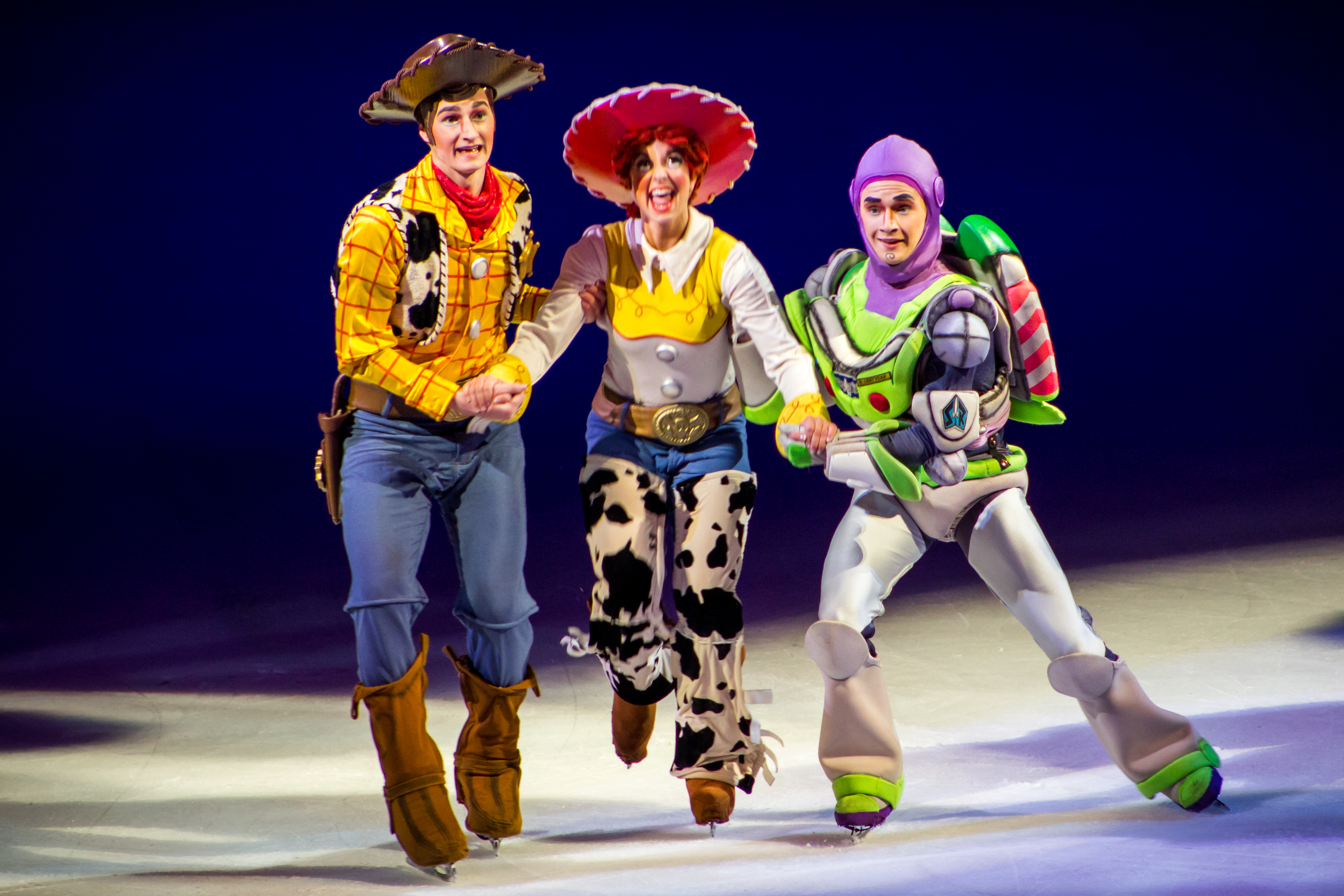
Woody (left) as he appeared in Disney on Ice: 100 Years of Magic

Adam Loosley appeared as Woody in Disney on Ice: Toy Story 3; it includes a "Hoedown Throwdown" scene where Woody, Jessie, and others skate dance to Miley Cyrus's song "Hoedown Throwdown" from the Disney Channel series Hannah Montana. He has also been portrayed by Daniel Harris in Disney on Ice: Worlds of Fantasy. Woody has also appeared in Disney on Ice: Mickey's Search Party and has been portrayed by Benji Toedte in Disney on Ice: Celebrate Memories. Nelson Sanchez-Leemet portrayed Woody in Disney on Ice: Road Trip Adventures, where in one scene he skates to the song "Old Town Road". Woody has also appeared in Disney on Ice: 100 Years of Magic.

==== Merchandise ====
After the release of Toy Story in 1995, Disney began releasing merchandise for Woody and other Toy Story characters. They made a talking Woody doll, along with mugs, magnets, figures, trading cards, throw blankets, bedding, lunch kits, calendars, greeting cards, gift wraps, and other merchandise with Woody on them. After the release of Toy Story 4, Disney created an interactive talking action figure Woody. Woody also appears in multiple Disney and Toy Story–related video games, including Disney Infinity, Kinect Rush: A Disney-Pixar Adventure, Kinect: Disneyland Adventures, Disney Magic Kingdoms, Kingdom Hearts III, Lego The Incredibles, and Disney Dreamlight Valley.

Woody appears in multiple Disney comics published by Boom! Entertainment from May to August 2009. They published four issues of a limited comic book series called Toy Story: Mysterious Strange. Woody also appears in the Toy Story Comics, published from May to August 2012, by Marvel and Disney Publishing called Toy Story: Tales from the Toy Chest. Woody was also featured in the Toy Story magazine, that was launched by Egmont in July 2010. It was a monthly magazine with 24 pages with the first one having 28 pages. Dark Horse Comics published a 72-page graphic novel related to Toy Story 4 in 2019 that had Woody in it.

==== Oscars ====
Woody, along with other Toy Story characters, voiced by their primary actors, have appeared and presented awards at the 68th, the 72nd, and the 88th Academy Awards. At the 68th Academy Awards, Woody and Buzz were left on the stage by John Lasseter after he received the Special Achievement Oscar. After being left on stage, Woody and Buzz did a short skit. At the 72nd Academy Awards, Woody, Buzz, and Jessie presented the Best Animated Short Film Oscar to The Old Man and the Sea by Aleksandr Petrov. At the 88th Academy Awards, Woody and Buzz were featured to honor the 20th anniversary of Toy Story's Oscar win and present the Oscar for the Best Animated Feature to Inside Out.

== Reception and legacy ==
You can't find a better friend than Sheriff Woody. [He] looked out for others, plotted rescue missions and valued loyalty. He was a role model for children, too, which could explain why he was front and center in the franchise. Woody was unwavering... "Toy Story" needed a leader, too, and Woody fit the hat... he didn't always lead by example, but ultimately learned what mattered most... The ultimate toy? That's Woody – loyal, dependable, trustworthy and steadfast.

— Bruce Miller, Sioux City Journal

Woody has been widely praised by critics because of his personality, loyalty, and leadership. Geoff Loftus of Forbes stated that Woody, along with Buzz, is a great leader because even what to do, "they never stop thinking" and "never stop looking for the answer to a problem... No matter how great the crisis." Collin McCormick of Screen Rant said that Pixar has created some "unforgettable characters over the years", but stated that Woody "might be the best of them all". Tom Power of Polygon compared Woody's arc to real-life people, saying that it "symbolizes the growth that we all experience. He's the embodiment of our own development, and acts as a lens through which we can see our own growth". Ben Child from The Guardian wrote that Woody is "The lovable hero of the Toy Story movies". While Nate Birch of Fatherly criticized Woody, saying that he is an "irredeemable jerk" and that he is the "heartless villain" of Toy Story, A. A. Dowd from The A.V. Club commented that Woody's selfishness and other qualities make him among "the most three-dimensional of cartoon characters".

Tom Hanks's vocal performance as Woody has also been praised by film critics. Susan Wloszczyna of USA Today approved of the selection of Hanks for the lead role of Woody. Kenneth Turan of the Los Angeles Times expressed that Hanks "brings an invaluable heft and believability to Woody." Ben Kaye of Looper also said that Hanks brings the character of Woody to life using his "unique voice" to imbue Woody with "humor, authority, and heart". Peter Bradshaw, film critic for The Guardian, stated Hanks's vocal work in Toy Story is one of his "most heartwarming, heartrending pieces of casting" in his career. Katie Walsh of The Columbian praised Hanks vocal performance writing, "Tom Hanks as Woody has always been one of the defining animation vocal performances."

Woody has also been ranked one of the best animated characters of all time. In June 2010, Entertainment Weekly named Woody one of the "100 Greatest Characters of the Last 20 Years", and Screen Rant ranked him the 6th best animated movie character of all time. Screen Rant also ranked him the number one Pixar character saying, "While he [Woody] has his fair share of good and bad moments, it's hard not to root for Woody in his endeavors, which helps make him the greatest Pixar character of all time." Declaring that Woody's "undying loyalty" is "a trait we'd all like to see in our best friends", Hollywood Insider also ranked him the number one Pixar character. Rolling Stone ranked Woody 12th among the best Pixar characters writing, "Tom Hanks imbued the rustler [Woody] with apoplectic hilarity and made for the perfect straight man against the delusional Buzz Lightyear, but it's the uglier aspects of his personality – envy, selfishness – that make this toy human."

Woody has also become popular among celebrities. In the TV dance competition show Dancing with the Stars, former White House Press Secretary Sean Spicer, dressed up as Woody while dancing to "You've Got a Friend in Me". Spicer dedicated the dance to his father who died of cancer in 2016. Woody has also impacted the cosplay community. "Sneak", a well-known French cosplayer, has done a cosplay of Woody. In 2011, Ryan Tubridy, the host of the Irish The Late Late Toy Show, dressed up as Woody. In 2019, at Lancashire, England, a woman named Lindsay Ashton wore Toy Story high-heels shoes that featured Woody on them on her wedding day.
