= Jessica Choi Smyth =

Film producer

Jessica Choi
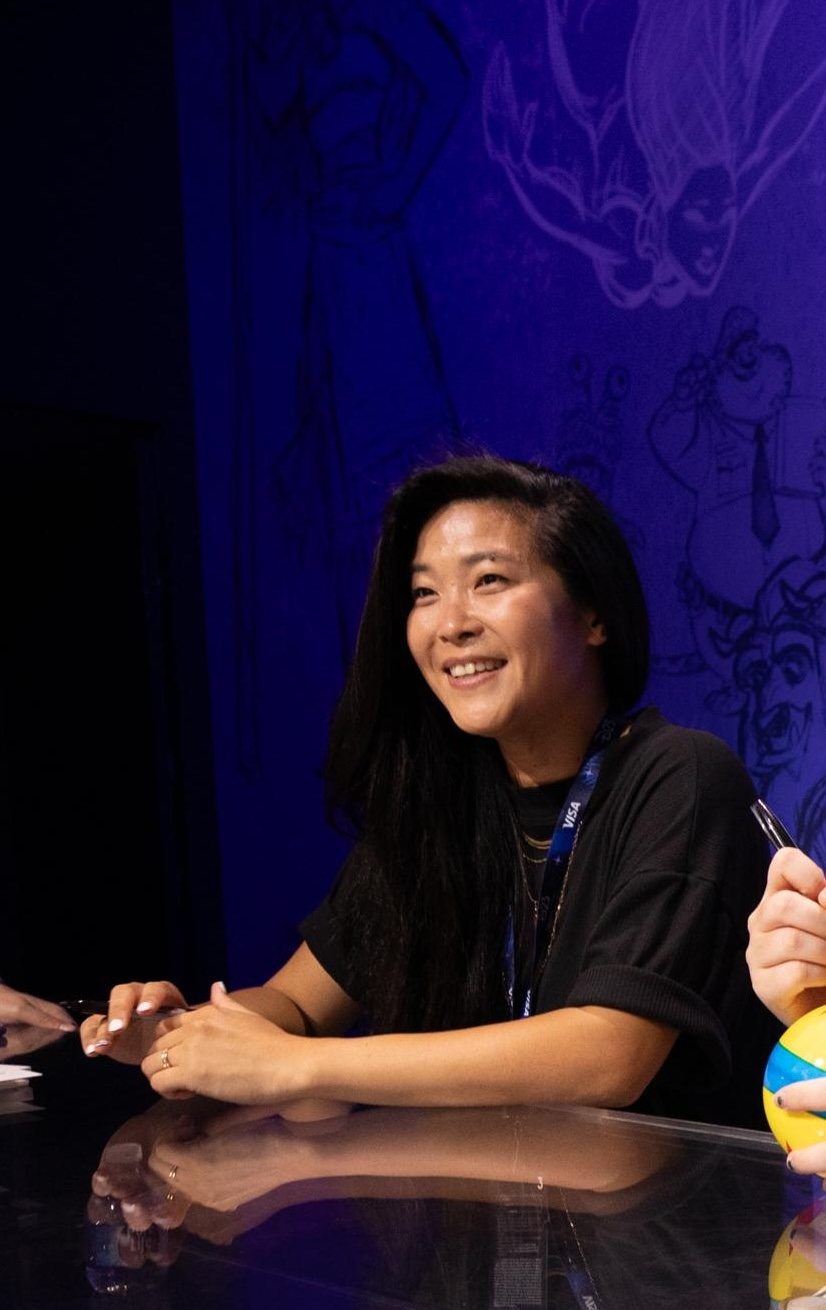
- Jessica Choi at D23 Filmmakers Event
- Born: Seoul, South Korea
- Other names: Jessica Choi Smyth; Jess Choi
- Education: King's College, Auckland; University of Southern California
- Occupation: Film producer
- Employer(s): Pixar Animation Studios (2022–2025); Netflix
- Notable work: Toy Story 5 Cats; The Sea Beast; Avatar: The Way of Water; Thor: Ragnarok; The Boss Baby

Jessica Choi, also known professionally as Jess Choi, is a film producer at Netflix. She is a producer of Toy Story 5, the fifth installment in Pixar's Toy Story film series. In 2025, she was named one of Variety's "10 Producers to Watch".

== Early life and education ==
Choi was born in Seoul, South Korea, and grew up in Browns Bay, New Zealand. She attended King's College in Auckland before studying in the Business of Cinematic Arts program at the University of Southern California.

== Career ==
Before joining Netflix, Choi worked at Pixar Animation Studios, DreamWorks Animation, Marvel Studios, and Netflix Animation.

Her career has included production and development work on animated and live-action films including Turbo, The Boss Baby, Thor: Ragnarok, The Nun, Cats, Velvet Buzzsaw, Back to the Outback, The Sea Beast, Avatar: The Way of Water, and The Monkey King.

In 2024, it was announced that she would produce Toy Story 5, directed by Andrew Stanton. At Pixar, she was credited on the senior creative team for Inside Out 2, Dream Productions, and Elio. In 2025, trade publications including The Hollywood Reporter identified Choi as producer of Toy Story 5.

Choi received the Producers Guild of America Producers Mark (p.g.a.) for her work on Toy Story 5.

== Recognition ==
In 2025, Choi was named one of Variety's "10 Producers to Watch", an annual recognition of emerging film producers.

The honorees were subsequently featured at the Bentonville Film Festival in programming organized in partnership with Variety.
