= Bo Peep (Toy Story) =

Fictional character from the Toy Story franchise

- Toy Story character
- Bo Peep in her appearance from the first two Toy Story films
- First appearance: Toy Story (1995)
- Created by: John Lasseter; Andrew Stanton; Pete Docter; Joe Ranft
- Based on: Little Bo-Peep nursery rhyme
- Voiced by: Annie Potts (films, video games); Rebecca Wink (Toy Story Racer)

In-universe information
- Species: Toy (Porcelain figurine)
- Gender: Female
- Occupation: Toy
- Significant other: Woody

Bo Peep is a fictional character appearing in the Disney–Pixar Toy Story franchise. The character is primarily voiced by Annie Potts. She appeared in Toy Story and Toy Story 2 as a supporting character, portrayed as a love interest to the protagonist, Woody. After being given away prior to the events of Toy Story 3, Bo Peep returned in Toy Story 4 as a major character and in Toy Story 5 as a supporting character.

Bo Peep was created by John Lasseter, Andrew Stanton, Joe Ranft, and Pete Docter for the original 1995 feature film, being based on the nursery rhyme "Little Bo-Peep". She was later re-conceived by the development team behind Toy Story 4. Her leading role in Toy Story 4 contributed to the character making live meet-and-greet appearances in Disney theme Parks after the film's release.

== Character design ==
A concept sketching Bo Peep's transformation from her first look to her appearance in Toy Story 4.

Joe Ranft really wanted Woody to have much of a love interest. Originally, Woody's love interest was supposed to be a Barbie doll, however, Mattel licensed the rights and the filmmakers took Barbie out of the film, resulting in Bo Peep. Bo Peep was a secondary character in the first two films of the franchise, missing the main action in both of them. John Lasseter's wife Nancy considered Jessie as a great addition to the cast in Toy Story 2, because she was perceived as a stronger character, and she had more substance than Bo.

However, Bo was given a major role in Toy Story 4. Regarding the portrayal of Bo in this film, story artist Carrie Hobson explained to GameSpot that the production staff decided to redefine the character for the fourth installment, working to nail down specific personality traits and ultimately positioning her as "a character who decided she didn't just want to sit on a shelf waiting for life to happen. She learned to adapt." Stylist interviewed some members of the staff, who explained that they "were trying to create a very strong character." To reinforce that idea, we never wanted to see her hair move." However, Kimh commented on Bo's material: "If you look closely, you'll see cracking in her hair – this is a subtle but constant reminder to the audience that she's made of porcelain." Regarding her look, Kihm added: "she’s athletic, and perhaps her new outfit gives her this sense of freedom to express that athleticism."

Journalist Danielle Tcholakian of GEN noted that according to one producer, Jason Rivera, Bo was re-designed for the film by "Team Bo", a group of around five women artists and character designers who would flag any potential problems with her storyline, and that another producer, Mark Nielsen, claimed that the movie was "kind of code-named Peep" during development due to the character's importance.

=== Personality ===
Bo Peep is portrayed as a very flirtatious, romantic, sensible and levelheaded toy. She is depicted as gentle, ladylike, and kindhearted. She has strong feelings for Woody and cares for him, which cause her (along with Slinky) to give him the benefit of the doubt when he allegedly murders Buzz Lightyear, whom she clearly considers attractive as well, and consistently whispers to the wall her worries about where Woody could be. Despite this, she still behaves like a free spirit. She only believes what she has witnessed for herself, such as when she looks into Lenny's visor and sees Buzz riding behind Woody aboard RC, while the rest of the toys immediately take her word for it. By the time she is moved to Molly's room, she becomes more of a leader amongst her toys as she is described by Woody to be the most capable of easing Molly's cries at night which often caused great dismay to everyone.

Since she parted ways with Andy and Molly, Bo has taken on a different point of view in life. As a lost toy, she never worries about being loved by a child and is open to seeing the world.

=== Voice acting ===
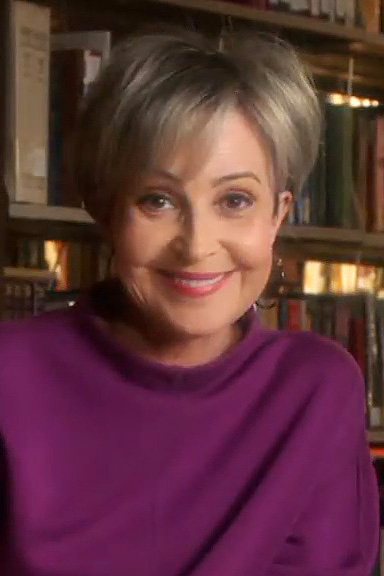
Annie Potts is the voice of Bo Peep.

Voice actress Annie Potts voiced the character in Toy Story, Toy Story 2, Toy Story 4 and Toy Story 5. Regarding the new portrayal of Bo in the fourth film, Potts told Glamour that Bo "is modern, independent, capable and confident. Bo is written and conceived to be inspiring as she has weathered life’s ups and downs with grace." Story supervisor Valerie LaPointe said that Potts gave this new version of Bo a deeper voice, more grit and natural charm.

In the video game Toy Story Racer, Bo is voiced by Rebecca Wink.

== Appearances ==
=== Toy Story films ===
==== Toy Story (1995) ====
The character is introduced in Toy Story as a porcelain figurine that is a detachable component of a bedside lamp along with a three-headed sheep belonging to Andy's younger sister Molly. Nonetheless, Andy is seen playing with her and the rest of his toys; in Andy's games of imaginative play, Bo is used as the damsel-in-distress of the stories. Bo is the protagonist Woody's romantic interest, and acts as a voice of reason for him. She is depicted as gentle, ladylike, and kindhearted. Woody is excluded from the group of toys when Buzz Lightyear starts to attract more attention, but Bo remains loyal to him rather than taunting him because of Buzz's rise in popularity. After Woody accidentally knocked Buzz out the window, she is one of the only toys who is skeptical to believe that Woody would have purposely harmed Buzz, even with their tumultuous start. At the end of the film, when Woody and Buzz return, she gives Woody a kiss.

==== Toy Story 2 (1999) ====
Bo makes a few brief speaking cameo appearances in the beginning and the end of Toy Story 2. She continues to show her attraction to Woody, flirting with him, and also assures him that Andy will always care about him.

==== Toy Story 3 (2010) ====
Bo appears briefly in the beginning of Toy Story 3 but doesn't speak. Her cameo is in the home movies Andy's mom makes. By the time of the actual events of the film, it is revealed that Bo is one of the toys that had been given away.

==== Toy Story 4 (2019) ====
Bo Peep's reimagined appearance in Toy Story 4.

In August 2015, it was revealed that Bo Peep would have a major role in Toy Story 4, with initial reports stating that the film would center on a quest by Woody and Buzz to find Bo.

Toy Story 4 reintroduces Bo Peep with a dramatically expanded and reimagined character arc, returning as a confident, resourceful, and independent leader. After being given away years before, she experiences neglect, life in an antique shop, and eventually chooses to live as a "lost toy". While her sheep—Billy, Goat, and Gruff—remain her companions, Bo embraces autonomy, self-determination, and the belief that toys can create meaning beyond ownership. Her changed outlook contrasts sharply with Woody's devotion to traditional toy loyalty, but Bo's evolution ultimately helps Woody reconsider his own identity through the course of the film.

==== Toy Story 5 (2026) ====
A few years after the events of the fourth film, Bo Peep and Woody, along with the rest of their group, have dedicated themselves to rescuing abandoned toys as children spend more and more time on screens and neglect their toys.

When a distraught Jessie, fearing that Bonnie's new Lilypad is taking over her role as Bonnie's favorite toy, contacts Woody by radio, Bo accompanies Woody back to Bonnie's house where they greet everyone, shortly thereafter leaving with Duke and Giggle.

Bo returns to Bonnie's house when Woody, Buzz and Jessie complete their mission of helping Bonnie make a friend. She and Woody watch through the window as Bonnie and Blaze play together with the toys, before leaving with Duke and Giggle.

=== Other appearances ===
==== Lamp Life (2020) ====
A short film titled Lamp Life, which reveals Bo's whereabouts between leaving and reuniting with Woody, was released on Disney+ on January 31, 2020.

==== Buzz Lightyear of Star Command (2000-01) ====
Bo also appears as a cameo character in the intro of the Buzz Lightyear of Star Command television series.

== Other media ==
=== Meet and greets ===
In 2019 following the release of Toy Story 4, Bo Peep began meeting and greeting guests at the Disney Parks and Resorts. She is located in Fantasyland and in Toy Story Land.

== Reception ==
Bo Peep's role in the first two films was called by Slate a "trophy for male cinematic heroism: a blond, blue-eyed, delicate, and conventionally beautiful woman who existed to be rescued and to reward Woody for his heroic acts with chaste kisses." Her participation in action scenes in these films was described by The Washington Post as limited, "suggesting she was perhaps as fragile as porcelain itself."

"It was Bo's revival that inspired director Josh Cooley and producers Jonas Rivera and Mark Nielsen to take a big risk in making a fourth film when the previous three had been huge successes critically."

— Claire Corkery from The National reviewing Toy Story 4.

Following her return and protagonism in Toy Story 4, Bo gained significant coverage. Describing her new look, The Telegraph says that "Wearing trousers instead of her old, pink floor-length shepherdess dress and bonnet, the new version of the Bo Peep is simply the right way to tell the story." Michael Cavna from The Washington Post wrote that "no character emerges from Pixar's Toy Story 4 exuding a stronger sense of self than Bo", and stated that Bo's new presence in the film rises as a symbol that reflects the contributions of leading women. Inkoo Kang from Slate considers that Bo had become "the rare female character expanded in a sequel whose journey doesn't feel secondary." Claire Corkery from The National wrote that Bo transformed "into a superhero who spearheads the many rescue missions the film series has become famous for." Josh Newis-Smith stated in Glamour that Bo "is just the empowered female Disney character we need in 2019."

However, there was negative criticism regarding Bo's new portrayal. Writer and film critic Stella Duffy said that the new portrayal of Bo is not feminist because "She's still going to fall in love, she's still going to have the happily ever after, that's not feminism! It's a woman who kicks off her skirt to reveal bloomers." Nell Frizzell from Vogue wrote that Bo changed from a "shepherdess in distress" into "badass", but considered that while movie studios (particularly Disney) have set a new distinction between damsels in distress and action heroines, all of them are slim, blond, and beautiful. Ernesto Huerta asked in Mexican newspaper Milenio if Bo's new personality responds to a need of the audience or to the political correctness that currently reigns in Hollywood. Beth Webb asked in British magazine Little White Lies: "The return of the sheep-herding heroine in Toy Story 4 signals a new chapter for the studio – but has anything changed behind the scenes?", referring to the reported neglect of the female staff by animation studios, as well as "lengthy" sexual misconduct allegations against John Lasseter.
