= List of Toy Story characters =

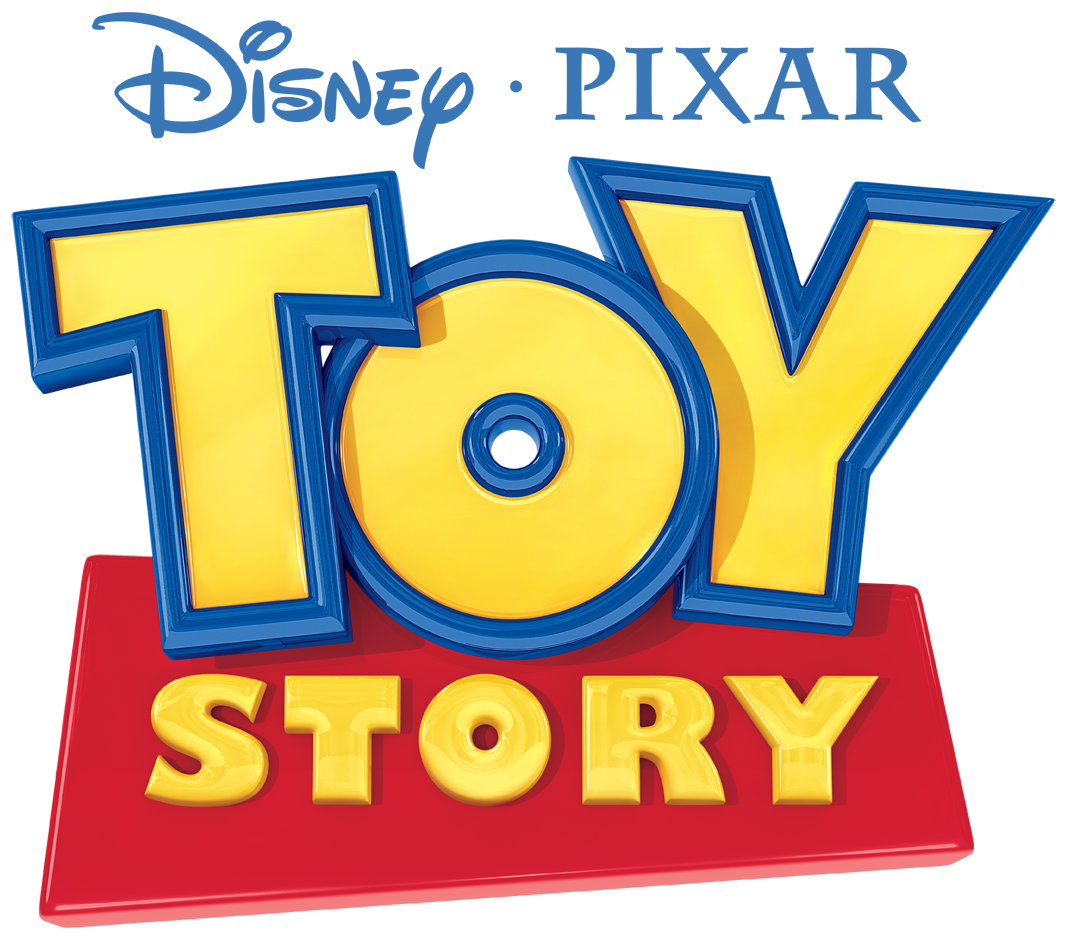
Logo used since May 29, 2009

This is a list of characters from Disney and Pixar's Toy Story franchise, which includes the animated feature films Toy Story, Toy Story 2, Toy Story 3, Toy Story 4, Toy Story 5, and Lightyear, as well as the Toy Story Toons series and television specials Toy Story of Terror! and Toy Story That Time Forgot.

== Main characters ==
=== Woody ===
Sheriff Woody Pride (voiced by Tom Hanks in the films and Jim Hanks in other media) is a 1950s-style pull-string cowboy doll. He is Andy's favorite toy and serves as the leader of the toy group. Woody is highly attached to his hat and becomes alarmed when it goes missing in Toy Story 2. His rivalry with Buzz Lightyear forms the basis of the first film's plot, as he resents Buzz for becoming Andy's new favorite toy.

In Toy Story 2, a toy collector named Al steals Woody from a yard sale, prompting the other toys to mount a rescue mission to Al's Toy Barn. It is revealed that Woody was the star of a fictional 1950s puppet television series titled Woody's Roundup.

In Toy Story 3, Woody and the other toys are donated to a daycare center, prompting him to lead a race to return home before Andy leaves for college. After navigating the dangers of the daycare, the toys are passed on to a four-year-old girl named Bonnie.

In Toy Story 4, Woody travels with Bo Peep, helping lost toys find owners and assisting Forky. Since this means leaving Bonnie and the rest of the toys, Woody puts Jessie in charge (pinning his Sheriff badge on her), and names his best friend Buzz Lightyear as her second-in-command.

Woody appears in Toy Story, Toy Story 2, Toy Story 3, Toy Story 4, Toy Story 5, Buzz Lightyear of Star Command: The Adventure Begins, Toy Story Treats, Toy Story Toons, Toy Story of Terror!, Toy Story That Time Forgot, and Lamp Life.

=== Buzz Lightyear ===
Buzz Lightyear (voiced by Tim Allen in the films, Patrick Warburton in Buzz Lightyear of Star Command, Pat Fraley in Toy Story Treats and video games, Mike MacRae in video games, Chris Evans in Lightyear, and Javier Fernández-Peña in Spanish mode) is a modern "Space Ranger" action figure. In the Toy Story films, he serves as Woody's second-in-command.

In the first film, Buzz initially believes he is a real Space Ranger and develops a rivalry with Woody. He later realizes that he is a toy, develops an existential crisis, which he overcomes, and ultimately forges an alliance with Woody.

In Toy Story 2, Buzz, together with Mr. Potato Head, Hamm, Rex, and Slinky, sets out to save Woody from Al. During the mission, he becomes stuck in the Buzz Lightyear aisle in Al's Toy Barn after being mistaken for another Buzz toy.

In Toy Story 3, Buzz and Jessie begin to develop a relationship, and he is particularly affectionate when switched to "Spanish mode". When Andy passes his toys to Bonnie, he describes Buzz as "the coolest toy ever".

Buzz Lightyear is also the protagonist of the 65-episode television series Buzz Lightyear of Star Command (2000–2001), which portrays him as a real Space Ranger. The 2022 Pixar film Lightyear depicts his origin story and features other Buzz Lightyear toys. In Lightyear, Buzz is a Space Ranger in Star Command who becomes involved in a conflict with Emperor Zurg after experiencing time dilation while testing faster-than-light travel.

In Toy Story 5, Buzz is left in charge of Bonnie's room while Jessie tries to stay with Bonnie during a sleepover, but when Jessie and Bullseye are lost and returned to the wrong house, he and a newly returned Woody must lead the fight against Lilypad's tricks to dominate Bonnie's life.

Buzz Lightyear appears in Toy Story, Toy Story 2, Toy Story 3, Toy Story 4, Toy Story 5, Toy Story Treats, Buzz Lightyear of Star Command, Toy Story Toons, Toy Story of Terror!, Toy Story That Time Forgot, Pixar Popcorn, and Lightyear.

=== Jessie ===
Jessica Jane "Jessie" Pride (voiced by Joan Cusack) is a cowgirl rag doll who joins Woody's group in Toy Story 2.

In that film, Jessie is initially happy to see Woody, but is surprised to learn he still has an owner, Andy. She is hesitant to join Andy's toys due to her experience with her previous owner, Emily, who placed her in a charity box for donations after outgrowing her. After Woody decides to get back to Andy so that he can be there for Andy until he grows up, he asks Jessie and Bullseye to join him. Jessie initially feels uncertain but later agrees to become Andy's toy.

In Toy Story 3, Jessie initially believes that Andy has thrown her and the other toys away. During the film, she grows close to Buzz Lightyear, particularly when he is in Spanish mode, and at the end, they dance to the Spanish version of "You've Got a Friend in Me", and, in Toy Story 5, she kisses and marries Buzz.

Jessie is the main protagonist in the 2013 television special Toy Story of Terror!, in which she saves the other toys from a toy thief and seller at a roadside rest stop.

Jessie appears in Toy Story 2, Toy Story 3, Toy Story 4, Toy Story 5, Buzz Lightyear of Star Command: The Adventure Begins, Toy Story Toons, Toy Story of Terror!, Toy Story That Time Forgot, and Pixar Popcorn.

=== Bo Peep ===
Bo Peep (voiced by Annie Potts) is a porcelain figurine and Woody's romantic interest. Inspired by the nursery rhyme "Little Bo-Peep", she is a kindhearted shepherdess accompanied by three sheep named Billy, Goat, and Gruff.

In the first film, she and her sheep are detachable components of Molly's bedside lamp. In Andy's imaginative plays, Bo Peep is portrayed as the damsel-in-distress, gentle and ladylike.

Bo Peep is given away before the events of Toy Story 3; Woody mentions that she has gone to a new owner. (Bo Peep appears briefly in the flashback video footages of Andy's Playtime in Toy Story 3)

She returns in Toy Story 4 in a more prominent role, as the film focuses on her relationship with Woody. In this film, her appearance and style are updated: she no longer wears a skirt, her frills are flattened, and she has a white bandage on her right arm and a purple bandage on her left hand to repair previous damage. Bo Peep also adopts a new philosophy regarding what it means to be a toy.

Bo Peep appears in the fifth film in a smaller role.

Bo Peep appears in Toy Story, Toy Story 2, Toy Story 3 (home videos), Toy Story 4, Toy Story 5, and Lamp Life.

=== Bullseye ===
Bullseye (vocal effects and provided by Frank Welker in entire Toy Story franchise, and speaking voiced by Alan Cumming in Toy Story 5) is a toy horse. In the fictional television series Woody's Roundup, Bullseye is portrayed as Woody and Jessie's horse.

In Toy Story 2, Bullseye is happy to see Woody after a long time in storage. He dislikes conflict, hiding in a can when Jessie jumps on Woody, and shows distress when Woody considers abandoning the Roundup Gang to return to Andy. Bullseye's loyalty motivates Woody to convince the other Roundup toys to return with him. Unlike most other toys, Bullseye does not speak but communicates through body language and occasional horse-like sounds. He is depicted as brave, gentle, and sensitive.

Bullseye returns in Toy Story 3 as one of the remaining toys in Andy's room and has a small role in Toy Story 4.

Bullseye appears in Toy Story 2, Toy Story 3, Toy Story 4, Toy Story 5, Buzz Lightyear of Star Command: The Adventure Begins, Toy Story Toons, and Pixar Popcorn.

At Disney California Adventure, Bullseye is featured in a carousel ride called Jessie's Critter Carousel.

=== Slinky Dog ===
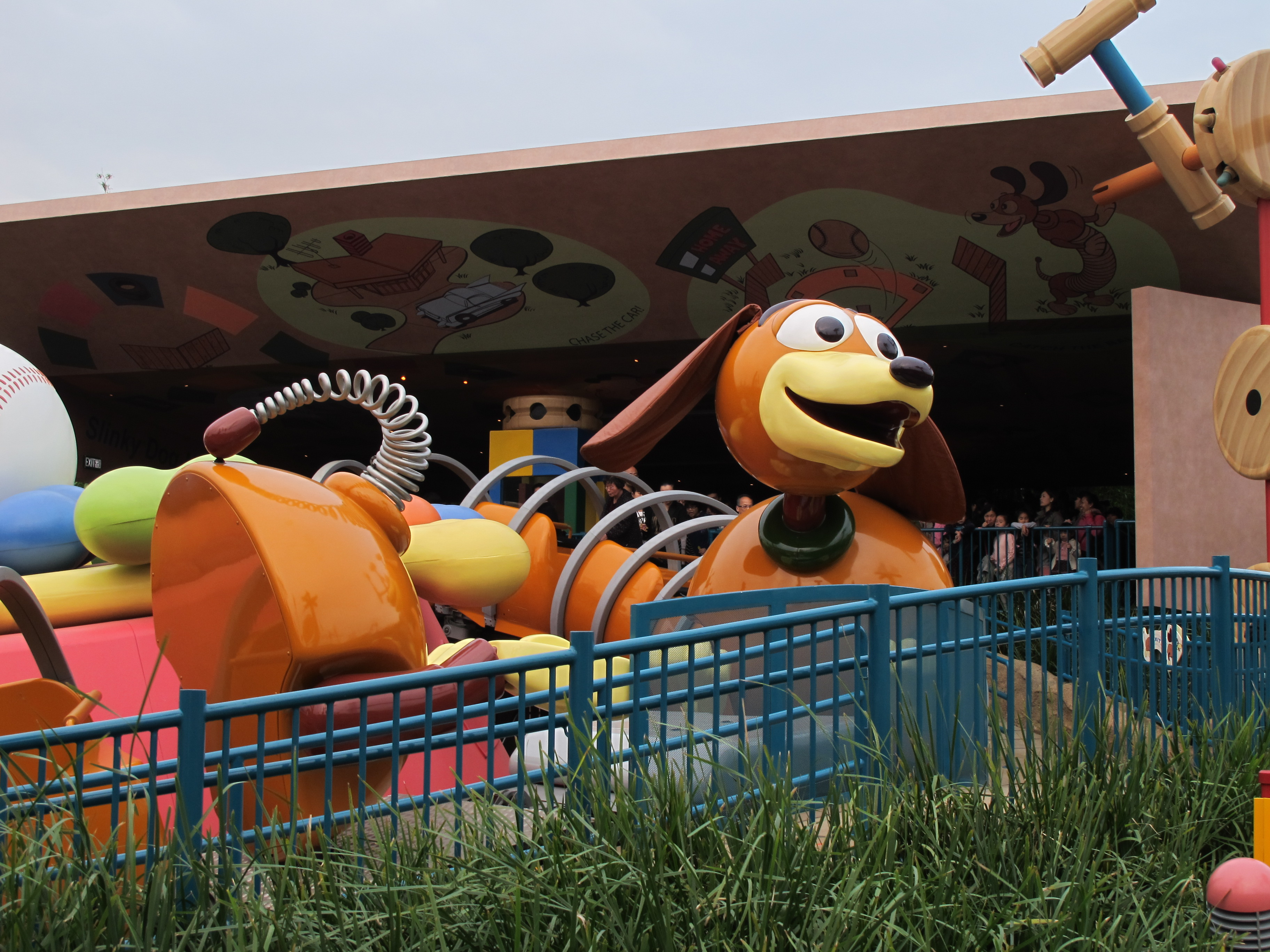
Slinky Dog Zigzag Spin ride at Hong Kong Disneyland

Slinky Dog, commonly known as Slinky (voiced by Jim Varney in first two films until his death, and later by Blake Clark), is a Southern-accented toy dachshund with a metal Slinky for a body. His body parts are plastic with articulated limbs and feet, and his ears are made of worn vinyl, suggesting he predates many of Andy's other toys. The character is based on the Slinky Dog toy manufactured between the 1950s and the 1970s. For the film, Pixar artist Bud Luckey partially redesigned the character to make him more suitable for animation.

In the opening scenes of Toy Story and Toy Story 3, Andy refers to Slinky as One-Eyed Bart's "attack dog with a built-in force field" during playtime.

Slinky also appears in the short film Hawaiian Vacation, in which he acts as a hotel porter during Ken and Barbie's Hawaiian adventures, Small Fry, and Partysaurus Rex. He makes a silent appearance in Buzz Lightyear of Star Command: The Adventure Begins.

Theme park attractions based on the character include Slinky Dog Zigzag Spin, which opened at several Disney theme parks beginning in 2010, and Slinky Dog Dash, a steel roller coaster that opened at Disney's Hollywood Studios at Walt Disney World in 2018.

Slinky Dog appears in Toy Story, Toy Story 2, Toy Story 3, Toy Story 4, Toy Story 5, Buzz Lightyear of Star Command: The Adventure Begins, Toy Story Toons, and Pixar Popcorn.

=== Rex ===
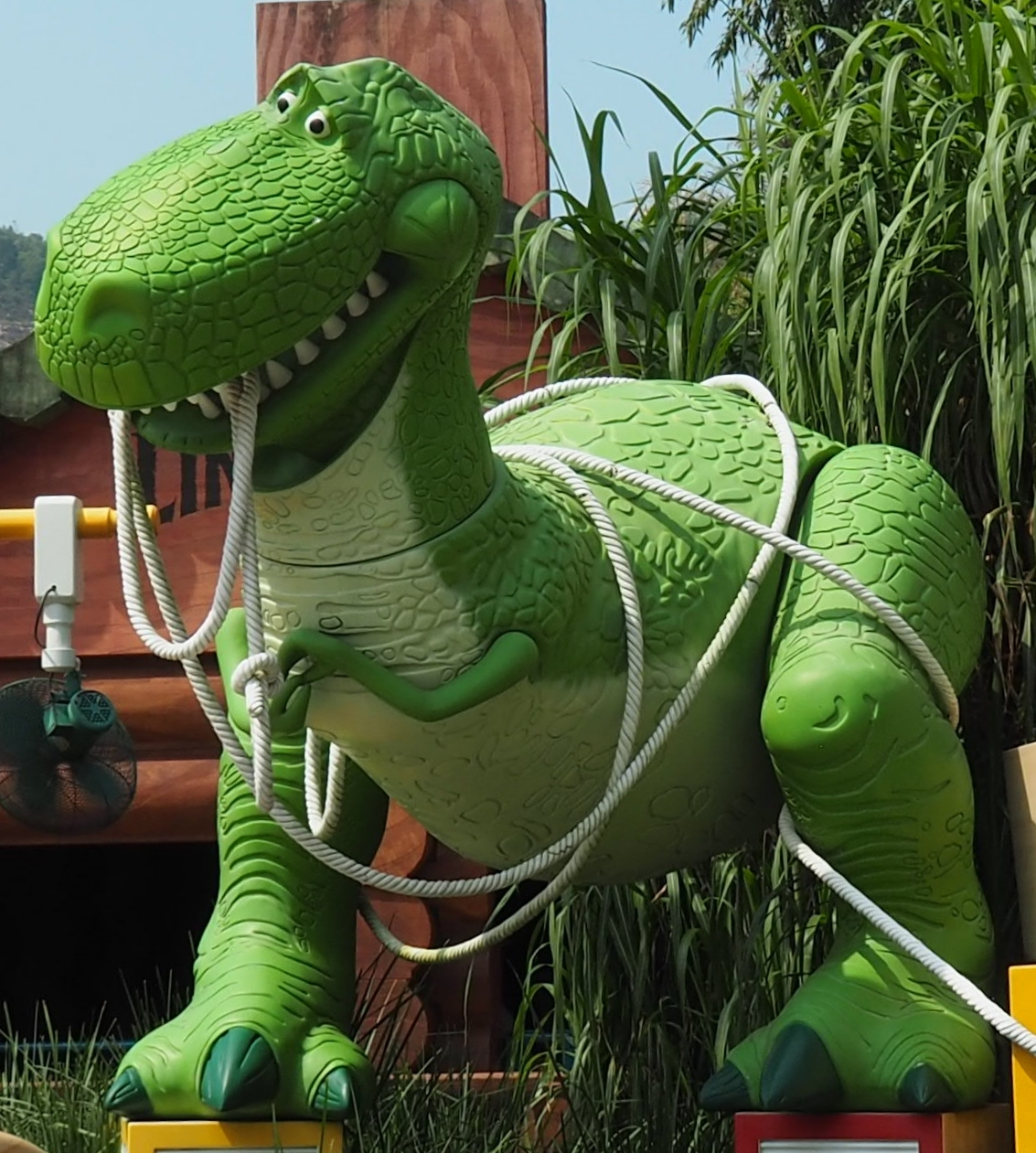
Rex statue at Hong Kong Disneyland

Rex (voiced by Wallace Shawn) is a large, green, plastic Tyrannosaurus rex toy characterized by his anxiety and self-doubt. He has an inferiority complex and frequently worries that he is not scary enough. In Toy Story, Rex fears that Andy will replace him with a more intimidating dinosaur, but he gains confidence after Buzz Lightyear offers him advice on how to roar more effectively.

Despite being a dinosaur, Rex dislikes confrontation and is portrayed as sensitive and easily distressed. He is also one of the largest toys in Andy's collection. In the opening scenes of Toy Story and Toy Story 3, Andy refers to Rex during playtime as Woody's "dinosaur who eats force field dogs". At the end of Toy Story 3, when giving his toys to Bonnie, Andy describes Rex as the "meanest, most terrifying dinosaur who ever lived".

In the video game adaptations, Rex is voiced by Earl Boen in Toy Story 2: Buzz Lightyear to the Rescue (1999) and Toy Story Racer (2001). He also makes a cameo appearance in an outtake from Monsters, Inc., in which he is seen waiting at a crosswalk with Mike and Sulley.

Rex appears in Toy Story, Toy Story 2, Toy Story 3, Toy Story 4, Toy Story 5, Toy Story Treats, Buzz Lightyear of Star Command: The Adventure Begins, Toy Story Toons, Toy Story of Terror!, Toy Story That Time Forgot, Forky Asks a Question, and Pixar Popcorn.

=== Hamm ===
Hamm (voiced by John Ratzenberger) is a wisecracking, stylized plastic piggy bank with a cork in his belly. He is close friends with Mr. Potato Head; in Toy Story, the two are seen playing cards and later the board game Battleship, which Hamm consistently wins. Of all Andy's toys, Hamm is portrayed as having the most knowledge of the outside world and is often familiar with various gadgets and technologies.

In Toy Story 2 and Toy Story 3, Andy imagines Hamm as a villain named "Evil Dr. Porkchop", who typically wears Mr. Potato Head's bowler hat. In the third film, the character is depicted with a large pig-shaped aircraft, which he uses during playtime to rescue One-Eyed Bart and One-Eyed Betty (the Potato Heads).

Hamm appears in Toy Story, Toy Story 2, Toy Story 3, Toy Story 4, Toy Story 5, Toy Story Treats, Buzz Lightyear of Star Command: The Adventure Begins, Toy Story Toons, Forky Asks a Question, and Pixar Popcorn.

He also makes a cameo appearance in the post-credits scene of Cars as part of a self-referential homage to Ratzenberger, who voices Mack in the film. In a 2010 television advertisement for the United States Postal Service promoting Toy Story 3, Hamm appears dressed as a postal worker while promoting Priority Mail. Ratzenberger reprised the role in the 2019 video game Kingdom Hearts III.

=== Mr. Potato Head ===
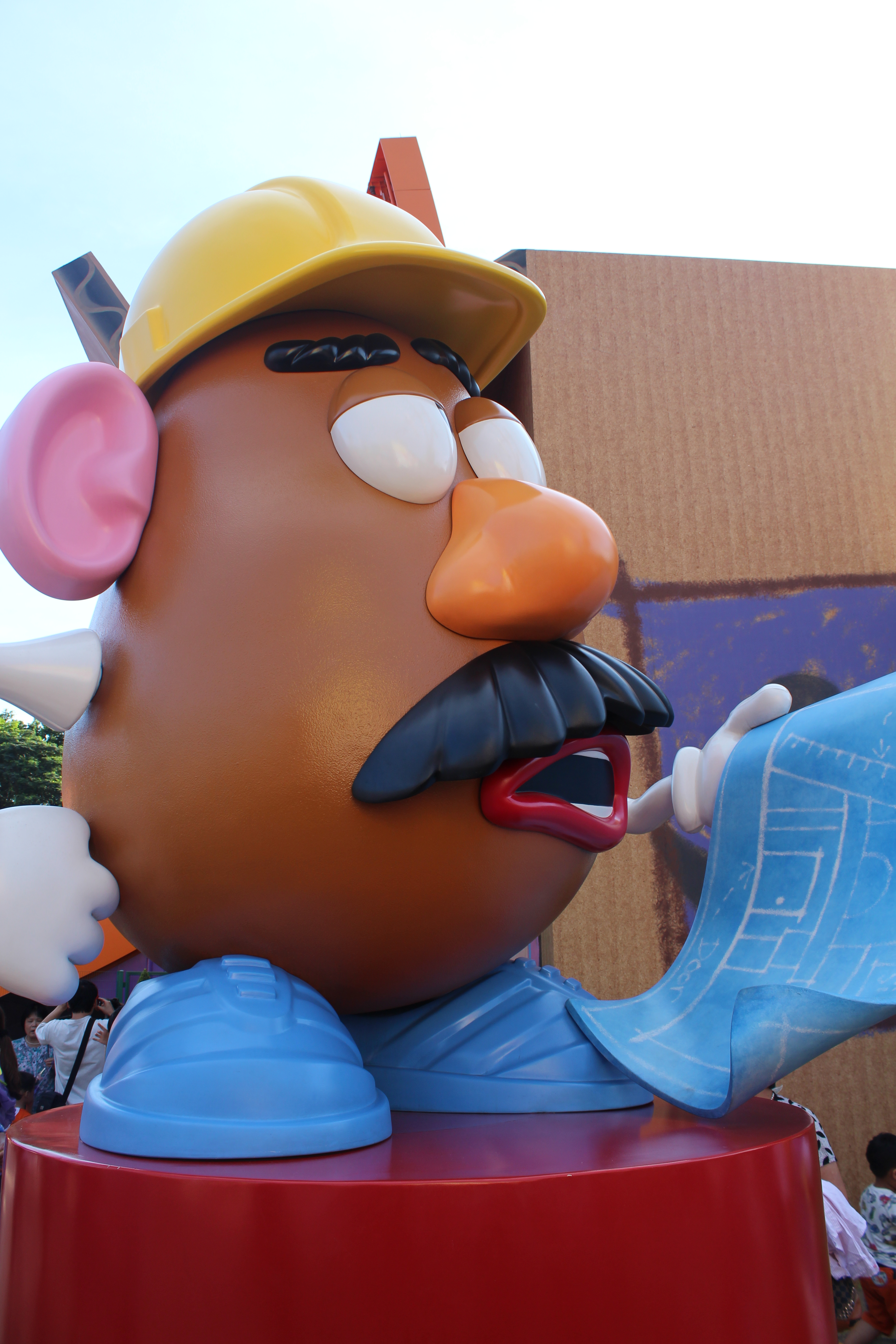
Mr. Potato Head statue at Hong Kong Disneyland, 2013

Mr. Potato Head (voiced by Don Rickles until his death, and later by Jeff Bergman) is a sarcastic, Brooklyn-accented Mr. Potato Head toy. His detachable design allows him to remove and rearrange his body parts and store extra pieces in a compartment on his lower back. He retains control over his parts even when they are separated from his body. Although this feature is frequently used for comedic effect, it has also proved useful in several situations, particularly in Toy Story 2 and Toy Story 3.

In the opening scenes of Toy Story and Toy Story 3, Andy imagines him as the outlaw One-Eyed Bart. He is married to Mrs. Potato Head, and in Toy Story 2, the couple becomes the adoptive parents of three alien toys.

Rickles had signed on to reprise the role in Toy Story 4, but died in 2017 before recording new material. At the request of his family, the filmmakers incorporated unused archival recordings from the previous films, Disney theme park attractions, and related video games. According to director Josh Cooley, the production team culled decades of recordings and worked with screenwriters Andrew Stanton and Stephany Folsom to construct new dialogue from existing material. The character ultimately appears in the film using repurposed audio.

Mr. Potato Head appears in Toy Story, Toy Story 2, Toy Story 3, Toy Story 4, Toy Story 5, Toy Story Toons, Toy Story of Terror!, Toy Story That Time Forgot, and Pixar Popcorn.

=== Mrs. Potato Head ===
Mrs. Potato Head (voiced by Estelle Harris until her death and later by Anna Vocino) is Mr. Potato Head's wife. She is depicted as sweet-tempered and easygoing, in contrast to her husband's more impatient and hot-headed personality. Although mentioned in Toy Story, she does not appear on screen until Toy Story 2.

In Toy Story 3, she has a larger role after one of her detachable eyes is left behind in Andy's room. Through the eye, she sees Andy searching for his missing toys, prompting the others to realize he did not intend to throw them away. She regards the three alien toys as her children, a view her husband comes to share after the aliens help save the toys from the incinerator. Her role in Andy's playtime is One-Eyed Betty, wife of One-Eyed Bart.

Mrs. Potato Head appears in Toy Story 2, Toy Story 3, Toy Story 4, Toy Story 5, Toy Story Toons and Pixar Popcorn.

=== Aliens ===
The Aliens, also known as Little Green Men (primarily voiced by Jeff Pidgeon, with Dee Bradley Baker in Tiny Toy Stories and Patrick Warburton in Buzz Lightyear of Star Command), are green, three-eyed squeaky toy aliens. They appear in all four main Toy Story films and are often heard saying "OOOOOO", "You saved our lives. We are eternally grateful," or "The claw" (Whenever they see or use one) in unison.

In Toy Story, Buzz and Woody encounter the Aliens inside a claw machine at Pizza Planet. The Aliens repeatedly state that "the Claw" determined who would be chosen, referring to the arcade machine's mechanism.

In Toy Story 2, the three aliens join Andy's toy collection after being rescued by Mr. Potato Head. They later accompany the toys on their mission to rescue Woody, expressing repeated gratitude to Mr. Potato Head for saving them. They also mistakenly identify the airport baggage area as a "mystic portal".

In Toy Story 3, the three Aliens are portrayed in Andy's imaginative play as henchmen to One-Eyed Bart and One-Eyed Betty. Later, after the toys are donated to Sunnyside Daycare, the Aliens operate a claw crane to rescue the other toys from an incinerator. Following this event, Mr. Potato Head acknowledges them as his children. They are subsequently given to Bonnie along with the rest of Andy's toys.

The Aliens appear briefly in Toy Story 4 and Toy Story 5. They also appear in the short films Hawaiian Vacation, Small Fry, Partysaurus Rex, and Pixar Popcorn, as well as in the video game Kingdom Hearts III. In the film Lightyear, they are referenced in the mid-credits scene as a decorative statue. A theme park attraction based on the characters, Alien Swirling Saucers, operates at the Hollywood studios park in Walt Disney World, Florida.

The Aliens appear in Toy Story, Toy Story 2, Toy Story 3, Toy Story 4, Toy Story 5, Toy Story Treats, Buzz Lightyear of Star Command: The Adventure Begins, Buzz Lightyear of Star Command, Toy Story Toons, Toy Story That Time Forgot and Pixar Popcorn.

=== Forky ===
Forky (voiced by Tony Hale) is a sentient spork toy made from a plastic spork with googly eyes, pipe cleaner arms, and popsicle stick legs. He is created by Bonnie in Toy Story 4, but initially rejects the idea that he is a toy, believing himself to be trash. Throughout the film, Woody repeatedly prevents him from throwing himself away and helps him understand his role in Bonnie's life. Forky returns in Toy Story 5.

According to director Josh Cooley, the character's name originated from his young son, who suggested "Fork Face" after seeing an early image of the character. Cooley later stated that the child's unfamiliarity with the term "spork" influenced the simplified name "Forky", which he felt reflects how a child like Bonnie might name the toy.

Forky is also the title character of the Disney+ short-form series Forky Asks a Question.

Forky Appears in Toy Story 4, Toy Story 5, Forky Asks a Question and Pixar Popcorn.

== Antagonists ==
=== Sid Phillips ===
Sidney "Sid" Phillips (voiced by Erik von Detten) is Andy's next-door neighbor in the first film, although it is unclear whether he and Andy know each other. Known for torturing and destroying toys, Sid serves as the film's main antagonist. Many of his toys are destroyed or have pieces missing, and are rebuilt using parts from other toys. He is also shown tormenting his sister, Hannah, and destroying her toys by blowing them up, burning them, or decapitating them. Sid enjoys skateboarding and wears a t-shirt depicting a human skull that was later used as the logo for Zero Skateboards. Andy's toys mention that Sid was repeatedly kicked out of summer camp; in the audio commentary on the 10th-anniversary DVD, the directors describe him as a bully, but also the "most creative character in the movie". His parents make only minor appearances: his mother's voice is briefly heard several times in the film, while his father is briefly seen asleep in a chair in front of a television.

Sid is the only human character in the films to witness toys actually coming to life. Near the end of the first film, Woody and Sid's mutant toys attempt to rescue Buzz by scaring Sid, leaving him terrified of toys. The final moment occurs when Woody comes to life while Sid is holding him and tells him to "play nice". Sid panics and runs back into the house, screaming, then flees to his room when his sister scares him with her doll.

Sid does not appear in the second film, although Buzz briefly mentions him during the toys' mission to rescue Woody from the toy collector, Al McWhiggin. Sid also appears in the four-issue Monsters, Inc. comic mini-series produced by Boom! Comics.

In the third film, Sid makes brief cameo appearances in two scenes, with von Detten reprising his role. He is shown working as a garbage collector and has grown a small beard, though he remains recognizable by his distinctive T-shirt. His only dialogue consists of humming guitar riffs, and he is depicted listening to heavy metal music through large headphones.

=== Scud ===
Scud is Sid's aggressive Bull Terrier and the secondary antagonist of the first film. He first appears when Sid blows up a Combat Carl in his backyard, and is shown to have a malicious attitude towards toys, violently chewing them to destroy them. His viciousness is demonstrated when Sid places a squeeze-toy Alien on his nose, and Scud mauls it. Scud becomes an obstacle for Woody and Buzz as they come to life and try to escape from Sid's house. Later, he spots Woody and Buzz trying to reach the moving van and pursues them, but they elude him when he chases them into the middle of a traffic intersection and becomes trapped by the cars crashing to avoid him.

=== Stinky Pete ===
Stinky Pete, commonly known as the Prospector (voiced by Kelsey Grammer), is a prospector doll and one of the two main and conclusive antagonists (alongside Al McWhiggin) in Toy Story 2. He was also Buzz Lightyear's following foe after the Emperor Zurg. He is a mint in the box toy modeled after a character from the fictional 1950s children's television show Woody's Roundup, which also features Woody, Jessie, and Bullseye.

In contrast to the bumbling, optimistic character portrayed on the show, the Prospector is intelligent, ruthless, short-tempered, and well-spoken. He openly despises space-themed toys like Buzz Lightyear, whom he angrily blames for the cancellation of Woody's Roundup following the launch of the Soviet satellite Sputnik, which made children all over America lose their interest in Western toys. The Prospector believes the Roundup Gang should be put on display in a toy museum, and secretly disrupts Woody's escape attempt and frames Jessie for the sabotage. Later, he openly intervenes when Woody asks the Roundup Gang to come home with him, warning them about toys spending a lifetime on a dime-store shelf watching other toys be sold, as he did, and would not let it happen again, hence his willingness to go to Japan. After a final confrontation at the airport, Andy's toys stuff the Prospector into a backpack belonging to Amy, an artistic girl who takes him in as her new toy.

In one of the film's outtakes, he is seen talking to two Barbie dolls in the box, saying that he could probably get them a role in the third film. This outtake was later deleted in the 2019 home media reissue, which media outlets inferred as a result of the MeToo movement.

The Prospector appears in Toy Story Mania!, the Disney Parks attraction ride, as well as the Toy Box mode of Toy Story 3: The Video Game, now voiced by Stephen Stanton.

=== Emperor Zurg ===
Emperor Zurg (voiced by Andrew Stanton in most media, Wayne Knight in Buzz Lightyear of Star Command: The Adventure Begins, Jess Harnell in a mini counterpart in Small Fry, James Patrick Stuart in the video game version of the third film, Kinect Disneyland Adventures, Disney Infinity, and Disney Magic Kingdoms, and James Brolin in Lightyear) is a robotic villain action figure and Buzz's archenemy. He is a thinly veiled parody of Darth Vader from the Star Wars franchise (with certain other visual elements adapted from the Death's Head character from Marvel UK). He usually carries an "ion blaster" that fires plastic balls. Zurg is mentioned in the first film as the "Zurg" but does not appear.

He debuts in Toy Story 2 as the secondary antagonist, where he battles with Ultra Buzz Lightyear. Zurg claims he is the father of Buzz, in an almost word-for-word homage to the famous scene in The Empire Strikes Back. Much like Palpatine in Return of the Jedi, he is unintentionally knocked down an elevator shaft by one of Andy's toys, Rex. In Toy Story 3, another Zurg appears briefly in the end credits, where he is donated to Sunnyside Daycare Center and greeted by the resident toys.

Zurg also appears in Buzz Lightyear of Star Command and its direct-to-video film Buzz Lightyear of Star Command: The Adventure Begins as the main antagonist of both. Zurg is also a playable character in the PlayStation 3 version of Toy Story 3: The Video Game, in Toy Box Mode. In the game, he has a convertible (the ZurgsMobile) that matches his personality. Zurg's mini counterpart is featured in the short film Small Fry.

A Zurg toy appears in the 2015 live-action Disney film Tomorrowland, in the Blast from the Past toy store.

In the 2022 spin-off film Lightyear, Zurg is revealed to be Buzz Lightyear, who has traveled centuries into the future due to the effects of time dilation after having experienced faster-than-light travel. Zurg reveals that he is 50 years older than his younger counterpart and that the name "Zurg" is the sound his robot minions make when referring to him (B'Zurg), leading him to assume the identity. He controls a mecha suit and travels back in time to confront his younger self and fix a mistake he believes he made. Zurg has become consumed by regret and resentment and is obsessed with his own "mission". He has missed out entirely on life and is blind to others' experiences. In Buzz's final battle against him, he is seemingly killed, but is later revealed to be alive in a post-credits scene.

In the 2026 film Toy Story 5, Zurg is mentioned by Buzz Lightyear when he reveals to an army of 50 Hi-Tech Edition Buzz Lightyear action figures stuck in play mode that Zurg is actually their father. A Hi-Tech Edition action figure of Zurg appears during a post-credit scene.

=== Al McWhiggin ===
Al McWhiggin, nicknamed "The Chicken Man" by Andy's toys, (voiced by Wayne Knight), is the owner of Al's Toy Barn and one of the two main antagonists (alongside Stinky Pete) of the second film.

Al is first seen in Toy Story 2 in an advertisement for his toy store, where he is dressed as the Chicken Man. Al is a collector of all things related to the old Woody's Roundup television show. He is greedy, unscrupulous, and lazy, as he complains of having to drive all the way to work on a Saturday, despite his apartment being only across the street from the store. While visiting the Davis family's yard sale, Al discovers Woody, but when he tries to buy him, Andy's mom refuses and locks Woody in a cash box for safety. In desperation, Al causes a distraction and breaks into the cash box to steal Woody. With the toy versions of all the Roundup characters collected, Al plans to sell them to a museum in Japan, but by the end of the film, with all of the characters' toys missing, he is shown in another Toy Barn commercial where he is openly despondent and sobbing, as the deal to sell the toys was lost.

His car's license plate reads LZTYBRN, which stands for "Al's Toy Barn". This is how Buzz figures out that the chicken man was Woody's kidnapper. It is also the actual license plate of Ash Brannon, co-director of Toy Story 2, according to the Toy Story 2: Special Edition commentary. Al is also alluded to in Toy Story of Terror! as a name on a shipping address on the box Woody was going to be sold in after being stolen, revealing that Al had tried to buy him again.

=== Zurg Bots ===
The Zurg Bots (both voiced by Angus MacLane) are Zurg's robot minions that appear in a Buzz Lightyear video game that Rex plays at the beginning of Toy Story 2, where they serve as the antagonists. The Zurg Bots each have a "Z" symbol on their chests, standing for "Zurg", a laser built into their right arms, and miniature versions of the Zurg Bots built into their shoulder armor. Rex, playing as Buzz, shoots a crystal near him with his laser, causing several lasers to shoot towards each Zurg Bot surrounding him and triggering an explosion. The Zurg Bots reappear in the film Lightyear, where they are named Zyclops, and act similarly to how they did in Toy Story 2, acting as minions of Zurg. In Lightyear, they can speak, but the only word they can say is "

=== Lots-o'-Huggin' Bear ===
Lots-o'-Huggin' Bear, often shortened to Lotso, (voiced by Ned Beatty in Toy Story 3 and Toy Story 3: The Video Game and Fred Tatasciore in Disney Speedstorm) is a plush, pink, strawberry-scented Southern-accented teddy bear and the main and conclusive antagonist of the third film. He has a limp from falling off a truck in his early years, and uses a wooden toy mallet as an assistive cane (although he is still able to walk without it). Lotso is the supreme ruler of the toys at the Sunnyside Daycare and initially acts like a kindhearted and wise caretaker, but is eventually revealed to be a ruthless and unkind prison warden.

Lotso, Big Baby, and Chuckles once belonged to a little girl named Daisy, whom Lotso adored. When Daisy fell asleep and accidentally left them at a rest stop, Lotso led the toys on a long journey home, only to discover that Daisy's parents had replaced him with a duplicate. Embittered beyond the point of insanity, Lotso convinced Big Baby that Daisy had replaced all of them, ended his friendship with Chuckles, and forced them both to come with him to Sunnyside. There, he established a dictatorship, depriving toys of the Butterfly Room unless they earn it, forbidding them from leaving or escaping back to their owners, and ensuring that the only way out is through the trash, which he believes is where all toys are destined to go. He often assigned new toys to the Caterpillar Room, where destructive toddlers who were too young to play with them properly were kept. Some threw them and broke them, while he and his henchmen reserved themselves in the Butterfly Room, where they were played with properly. When Woody reveals Lotso's true character, all of Lotso's henchmen turn on him, and Big Baby throws Lotso in the dumpster. Seeking revenge, he pulls Woody into the dumpster, resulting in Andy's toys jumping in to save him just as the garbage truck arrives. All of them end up at the dump on a conveyor belt leading to a shredder, and then an incinerator. Lotso, getting free with Woody and Buzz's help, reaches an emergency stop button, but sadistically decides at the last minute to leave the other toys to be burned as a last-ditch attempt to keep them from returning to Andy. However, his final plot failed at the last second when Andy's toys were saved by the Aliens with a giant claw. Hamm and Slinky wish to get revenge on Lotso for his betrayal, but Woody convinces them he is not worth it, feeling that the dump is where he belongs. Lotso, meanwhile, attempts to escape from the dump, but a sanitation worker (who had owned a Lots-o'-Huggin' Bear during his childhood) finds Lotso and straps him to the grill of his truck as a decoration.

Lotso was intended to be in the first film, but the technology to represent realistic fur was not available until Monsters, Inc. An early version of Lotso makes a brief appearance in the first film, and can be seen in the second film during the first Al's Toy Barn commercial. A Lotso bear also makes a cameo appearance in Pixar's film Up.

Ned Beatty was nominated for an MTV Movie Award for Best Villain for his performance as Lotso, and IGN named Lotso the best villain of the summer of 2010.

=== Ron and Mr. Jones ===
Ron (voiced by Stephen Tobolowsky) is the greedy manager of the Sleep Well Motel. He has a habit of stealing toys from customers in his motel and selling them on the Internet, with the help of his pet iguana, Mr. Jones (vocal effects provided by Dee Bradley Baker), who snatches the toys in the middle of the night. When Bonnie and her mother went to sleep after their car got a flat tire, Mr. Jones stole several of Bonnie's toys, including Woody, Buzz, and Jessie. Ron takes pictures of the toys and puts them up for sale, awaiting buyers. Jessie tricks Mr. Jones into tearing off a curtain, revealing the toys' location and Ron's scheme to Bonnie and her mother, who then calls the police. Two police officers later arrive to question Ron, who attempts to escape by stealing their car, but is forced to flee on foot after immediately crashing it into the motel sign. The police officers initiate a search for him.

=== Cleric ===
The Cleric (voiced by Steve Purcell) is the "spiritual" leader of the Battlesaurs. The Cleric is the first Battlesaur shown to be aware of their status as toys, but conceals it from the others so that he can rule over them and Mason's other toys. However, his plans are thwarted when Reptillus sides with Trixie; he is later shown apparently enjoying his new role as Mason's toy.

=== Dragon ===
Dragon is a gray cat who lives in Second Chance Antiques and loves to destroy all toys.

== Introduced in Toy Story ==
=== Andy's toys ===
==== Billy, Goat and Gruff ====
Billy, Goat and Gruff (voiced by Emily Davis) are Bo Peep's three-headed sheep companions. Billy, Goat and Gruff appear in Toy Story, Toy Story 2, Toy Story 4, Toy Story Treats, Lamp Life, and Pixar Popcorn.

==== Sarge and the Bucket o' Soldiers ====
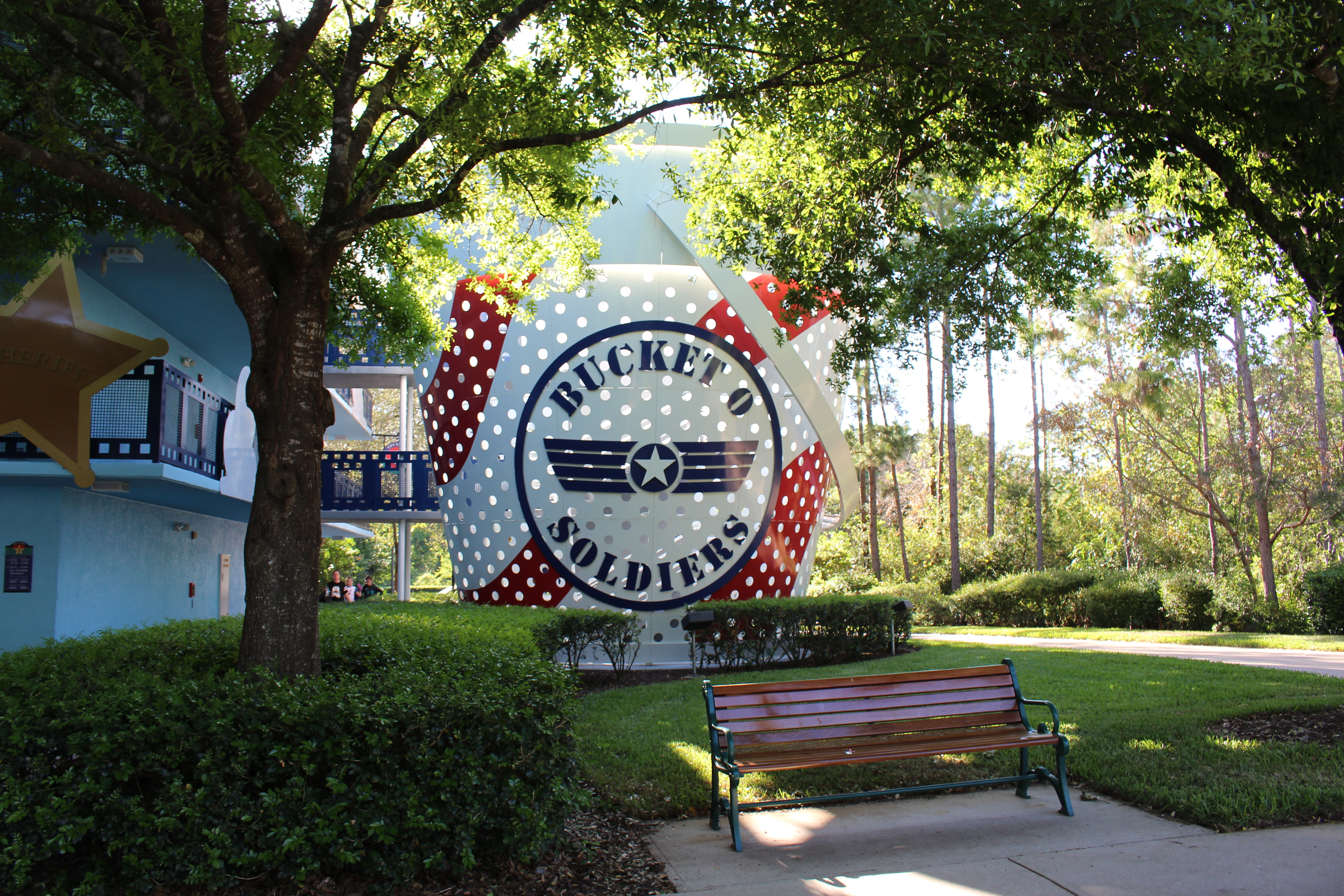
A model of Bucket O Soldiers at Disney's All-Star Movies Resort in Florida

Sarge, also known as Sergeant (voiced by R. Lee Ermey), is the determined commander of a group of green plastic army men collectively referred to as Bucket o' Soldiers. The soldiers are typically stored in a plastic bucket and specialize in reconnaissance missions. They play a prominent role in Toy Story and have smaller roles in Toy Story 2 and Toy Story 3.

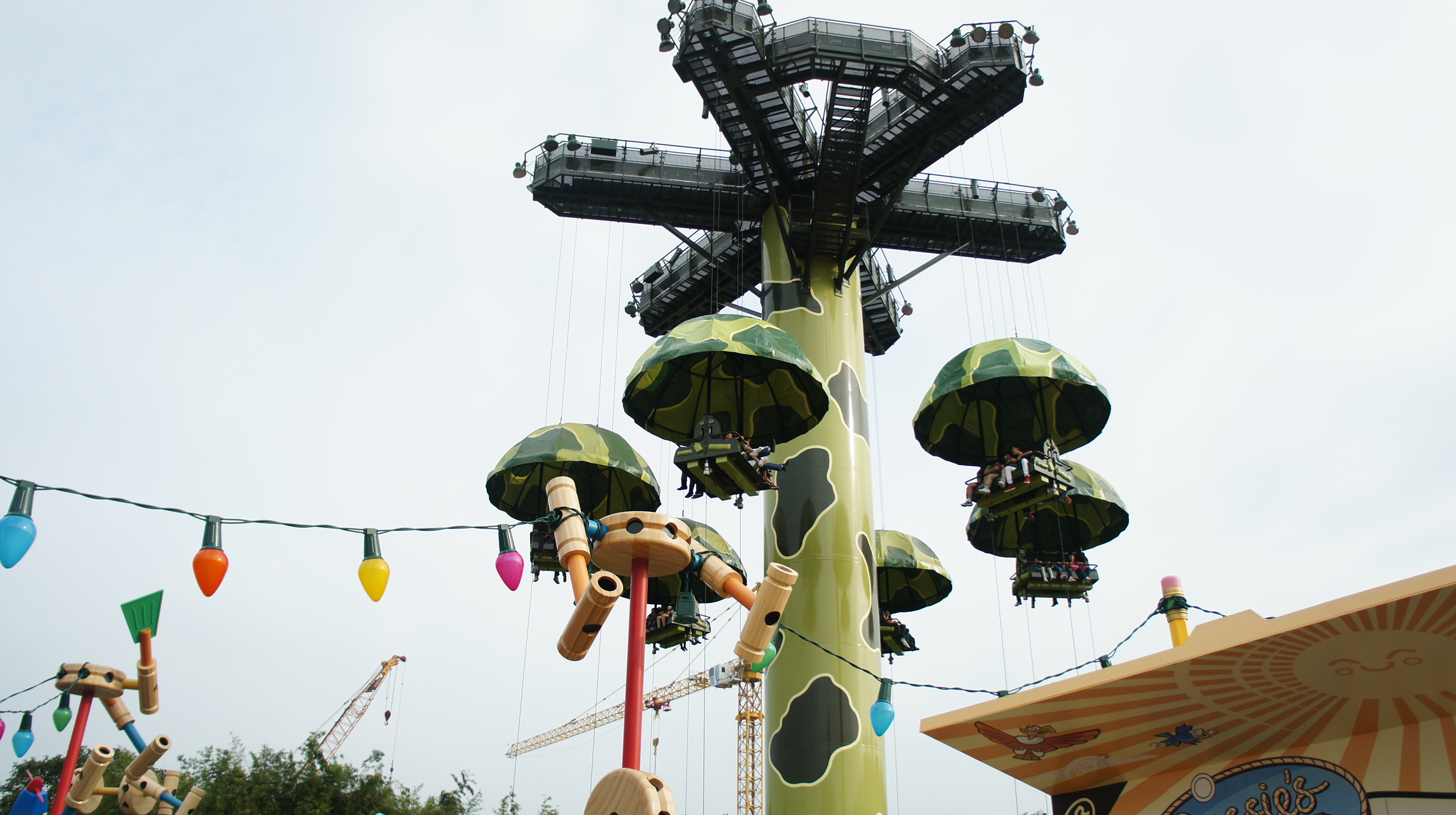
Toy Soldiers Parachute Drop ride in Hong Kong

The characters also appear in the video game Kingdom Hearts III. A theme park attraction based on the characters, Toy Soldiers Parachute Drop, operates at Disney parks in France and Hong Kong.

==== RC ====
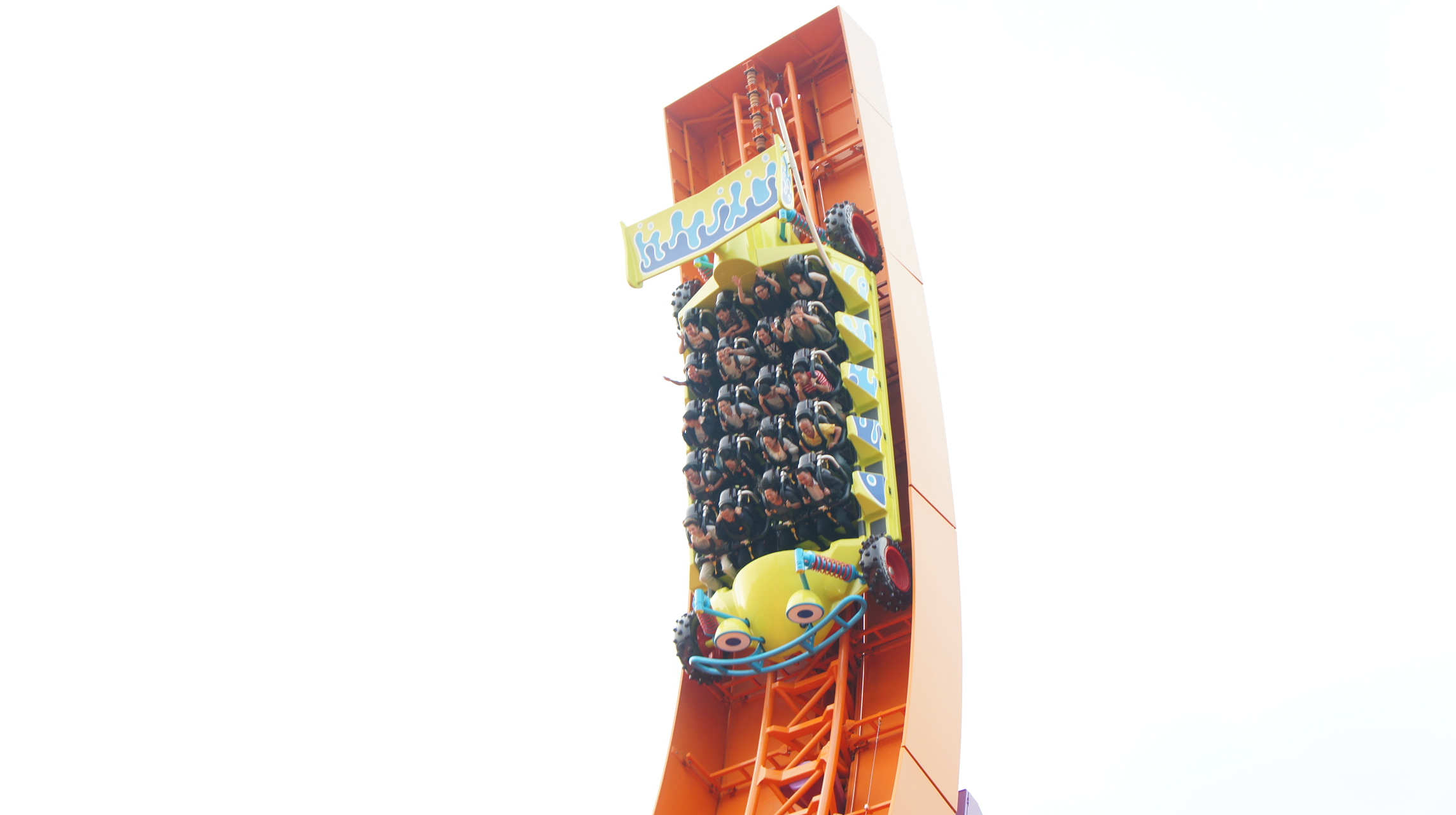
RC Racer ride at Hong Kong Disneyland

RC is Andy's remote-controlled buggy, with a green body and blue splash decals. He does not speak; instead, he communicates through revving and engine sounds that some of the other toys, such as Mr. Potato Head, can understand.

RC appears in Toy Story and Toy Story 2, in flashback scenes in Toy Story 3, and the prologue of Toy Story 4, chronologically set between the second and third films. He also appears in the end credits sequence of Toy Story 5. RC's most notable role is in the climax of the first film, as he is used by Woody and Buzz to escape from Sid and to chase the moving truck. Though his batteries run out, RC is dropped back into the moving truck by Woody after he lights the rocket attached to Buzz's back. Between the second and third films, RC was left outside during a rainstorm until being rescued by Woody and some of Andy's other toys.

Outside the films, RC appears as a playable character in the video game Toy Story Racer. The character also inspired the roller coaster RC Racer, which operates at several Disney theme parks and features riders "transported" in vehicles modeled after RC.

=== Andy's other toys ===
==== Rocky Gibraltar ====
Rocky Gibraltar (voiced by Jack Angel) is a heavyweight wrestler figure. He is silent and plays a minor role in the first two films. Rocky speaks in the Disney Adventures comics and in the Disney Interactive games, Disney's Animated Storybook: Toy Story and Toy Story Activity Center. He is a playable character in the Toy Story Racer video game. Rocky is absent from Toy Story 3 and is no longer shown in Andy's room, he was either sold, donated or trashed. His name and the logo on his championship belt are references to the Rock of Gibraltar.

==== Etch ====
Etch is an Etch A Sketch toy capable of drawing various images quickly and accurately. In the first film, it sketches a hangman's noose and shows it to Woody after the toys revolt against him for knocking Buzz out of a window. In the second film, Etch helps by sketching portraits of Woody's kidnapper and later creating a map showing the location of Al's Toy Barn. In Toy Story 3, it appears only in footage of Andy as a young boy, and Woody mentions that Etch was one of the toys donated to someone else.

==== Lenny ====
Lenny (voiced by Joe Ranft) is a pair of blue wind-up binoculars used by the other toys to get a better view during various situations in the first two films. Lenny is a playable character in the Toy Story Racer video game and also appears in Toy Story 3 through home video footage from Andy's childhood. Lenny was either sold, donated or trashed between the second and third Toy Story films.

==== The Magic 8 Ball ====
The Magic 8 Ball makes brief appearances in the first three films. In the first film, Woody asks the ball whether Andy would pick him instead of Buzz Lightyear to take along to Pizza Planet, but the ball replies, "Don't Count On It", upsetting Woody. Woody shoves the ball aside, and it falls behind a desk. In Toy Story 3, a disinterested Molly tosses the ball into a donation box along with several other toys heading to Sunnyside daycare.

==== Mike ====
Mike is a Playskool tape recorder toy who helps Woody amplify his voice during a toy meeting using his attached microphone. At the end of Toy Story 2, Wheezy uses Mike as a karaoke machine.

==== Farmer Says See 'n Say ====
A Farmer Says See 'n Say is one of Andy's toys in the first film. It communicates by spinning its pointer. The original pull-string variant appears in Toy Story 3, where it is used as a roulette wheel by Lotso's henchmen.

==== Mr. Shark ====
Mr. Shark (voiced by Andrew Stanton) is a blue squeak toy shark who appears in the first two films. In the first film, he steals Woody's hat and imitates him before Woody takes it back. In Toy Story 2, he is used as part of a makeshift "death trap" during Andy's playtime, and at the end of the film, he repairs Wheezy by providing an extra squeaker.

==== Mr. Spell ====
Mr. Spell (voiced by Jeff Pidgeon) is a yellow toy with a built-in keyboard that speaks words typed on it. He makes brief appearances in the first two films, and it is stated that he has held toy seminars on topics such as "plastic corrosion awareness" and "what to do if you or part of you is swallowed." In Toy Story 2, Buzz uses Mr. Spell to help identify the man who stole Woody from the yard sale. Mr. Spell also appears in Forky Asks a Question.

==== Robot ====
Robot (voiced by Jeff Pidgeon) is a red and blue toy robot. In Toy Story, he stands on his head so Buzz can run on his treads like a treadmill. In Toy Story 2, he helps Buzz ensure all of Andy's toys are accounted for after learning about the yard sale. He is not seen again until the end of the film, when he watches Wheezy sing "You've Got a Friend in Me". In Toy Story 3, Robot appears only in home video footage near the beginning of the film.

==== Snake ====
Snake is a green and purple toy snake that communicates through hissing. It appears briefly in the first two films and is shown only in home video footage at the beginning of Toy Story 3.

==== Troikas ====
Troikas are a set of five non-talking, egg-shaped toys featured in Toy Story and Toy Story 2. They vary in size, with one able to fit inside another, similarly to Matryoshka dolls. In order from biggest to smallest, they are a dog, a cat, a duck, a fish, and a bug.

==== Toddle Tots ====
Toddle Tots and a Little Tikes fire truck are among Andy's toys in the first two films.

==== Troll doll ====
Troll doll is a small doll with pink hair and a blue bathing suit, appearing in the first two films. In the first film, it became fascinated with Buzz and is seen lifting weights with him. In Toy Story 2, it is seen alongside Bo Peep, helping search for Woody's hat before Andy takes him along to cowboy camp. It briefly appears in Toy Story 3 through old home videos of Andy as a child. A group of Troll dolls also appears in the third film's opening sequence, in which they are portrayed as orphans on a runaway train during Andy's playtime.

==== Barrel of Monkeys ====
Barrel of Monkeys is a barrel used to contain red monkeys whose arms interlock. In a brief appearance, the monkeys are lowered by Andy's other toys out of the bedroom window in an attempt to retrieve Buzz, but the plan fails because there are not enough monkeys. They make brief appearances in the next two films during Andy's playtime. The Monkeys appear in the flashback sequence in Toy Story 4, where they help Woody, Slinky & Bo Peep on their mission to rescue RC. A Barrel of Monkeys is also briefly featured as one of Bonnie's toys in the short film Hawaiian Vacation.

==== Roly-Poly Clown ====
Roly-Poly Clown is a toy clown that jingles when it is wobbled. It only appears in the first two films.

==== Hockey Puck ====
A hockey puck with yellow gloves and red boots appears in the first film after Mr. Potato Head tells Hamm that he is Picasso.

=== Davis family ===
==== Andy Davis ====
Andrew "Andy" Davis (voiced by John Morris in the first four films, Erik von Detten in the animated storybook game, Charlie Bright in Toy Story 3, and Jack McGraw in Toy Story 4) is one of the Toy Story franchise's overarching protagonists, alongside Bonnie, and the original owner of Woody, Buzz Lightyear, and the other toys in the first three films. He lives with his mother and sister, Molly, until the third film, when he goes to college after turning 17. His father is never seen or mentioned in the films. In Toy Story 2, Andy's mother calls Woody "an old family toy", and the Prospector calls him a hand-me-down toy. John Lasseter said, "We always thought that Woody was kind of a hand-me-down to Andy from his father".

According to Toy Story producer Ralph Guggenheim in a December 1995 Animation Magazine article, John Lasseter and the story team reviewed the names of Pixar employees' children to find the right name for Woody's owner. Davis was ultimately named after and based on Andy Luckey, the son of animator Bud Luckey, Pixar's fifth employee, and the creator of Woody.

Andy's physical appearance differs slightly across the films due to advances in animation technology.

==== Mrs. Davis ====
Mrs. Davis (voiced by Laurie Metcalf) is Andy and Molly's single mother. She is portrayed as a loving parent to Andy and Molly, but also acts as an indirect threat to the toys. Her actions involving the toys help set the plot in motion in the first three films, though they are not malicious.

In the first film, she buys a Buzz Lightyear toy for Andy on his birthday, prompting the rivalry between Buzz and Woody that eventually leads to the two toys being lost and forced to find their way home. In the second film, she places Wheezy in a yard sale, prompting Woody's rescue attempt, during which Al McWhiggin steals him. In the third film, she asks Andy to clean out his room before he leaves for college and mistakenly throws away the toys he planned to put in the attic.

Despite this, in the second film, she is very protective of Woody, describing him as an "old family toy" when a collector, Al McWhiggin, offers to buy him at the yard sale. At the end of the third film, she becomes emotional and cries as Andy prepares to leave for college, but Andy reassures her that they will remain connected even when apart. This moment influences Woody's decision to have Andy donate the toys to Bonnie, giving them a new life.

==== Molly Davis ====
Molly Davis (voiced by Hannah Unkrich in Toy Story 2 and in archived footage in Toy Story 3, and by Bea Miller in Toy Story 3) is Andy's younger sister. She is depicted as a baby in the first film, a toddler in the second film, and a preteen in the third. At the beginning of the first film, Andy uses her crib as a town jail during playtime, showing that they share a room. When the family moves later in the film, Andy and Molly are given separate rooms, though Molly plans to move into Andy's room once he leaves for college.

In the first film, she drools on Mr. Potato Head and throws him out of the crib, scattering his parts and earning her the nickname "Princess Drool" from him. At the end of the film, she receives a Mrs. Potato Head toy for Christmas. In Toy Story 3, she owned a Barbie doll, which she donated to the daycare center after losing interest in dolls and toys.

In Toy Story 2, Molly is voiced by co-director Lee Unkrich's daughter, Hannah Unkrich. Unkrich later reused recordings of his daughter to portray Molly in the old home-video scenes at the beginning of Toy Story 3.

=== Phillips family ===
==== Hannah Phillips ====
Hannah Phillips (voiced by Sarah Freeman) is Sid's sweet-natured younger sister, who appears a few times in the film. Having adjusted to her toys being mutilated by Sid, most of Hannah's dolls have different heads or altered body parts. At the end of the film, she takes pleasure in scaring her brother after he is horrified by Woody and the other toys revealing their anthropomorphism. She spends most of her screen time playing with her altered dolls.

==== Mrs. Phillips ====
Mrs. Phillips (voiced by Mickie McGowan) is Sid and Hannah's unseen mother with few lines.

=== Sid and Hannah's toys ===
==== Babyface ====
Babyface is a one-eyed baby doll head staked on top of a spider-like body with crab or scorpion-like pincers made of Erector Set pieces. She is the leader of the mutant toys. Babyface is shown communicating with the other toys by banging in Morse code on the side of Sid's metal bedpost with her big claw. This method is used when she signals the other mutant toys to gather around to listen to Woody as he formulates his plan to rescue Buzz from Sid. When the mutant toys surround Sid, Babyface, who is suspended by Legs, lands on Sid's head, scaring him instantly. Babyface appears in Toy Story Treats, and is a playable character in the 2001 video game Toy Story Racer. In 2010, the Disney Store released a remote-controlled Babyface toy.

==== Legs ====
Legs is a green toy fishing rod with Barbie doll legs. When Woody formulates his plan to save Buzz from Sid, he assigns Legs to partner up with Ducky. Legs opens the vent grating so that she and Ducky can go to the front porch. Here, Legs lowers Ducky through the hole Ducky created so he can swing toward the doorbell. After Ducky catches the frog, Legs pulls both toys up to safety. Later, when the mutant toys advance on Sid, Legs lowers Babyface onto Sid's head, scaring him. Legs also appears in Toy Story Treats.

==== Hand-in-the-box toy ====
A jack-in-the-box toy with a green Frankenstein's Monster-esque hand that pops out. During Woody's plan to save Buzz from Sid, the toy extends its hand to Sid's doorknob, ready to open the door when the signal comes. The hand later grabs Sid's leg when the mutant toys surround him. The toy also appears in Toy Story Treats.

==== Rollerbob ====
RollerBob is a jet pilot action figure whose torso has been attached to a skateboard that replaces his legs. After the frog is let out of Sid's room to distract Scud, RollerBob ferries Woody and the other mutant toys outside of the house to Sid's yard.

==== Rockmobile ====
Rockmobile is the head of a toy insect attached to a small, headless human torso toy who is holding a steering wheel. This torso is attached to the head socket of a larger, muscular human torso toy that is missing its legs.

==== Pump Boy ====
Pump Boy is a yellow convertible toy car with baby doll limbs instead of wheels. It can walk very fast and climb walls. As part of the toys' rescue plan, Woody chooses Pump Boy to wind up the frog to distract Scud.

==== Tin Wind-up Frog ====
A tin wind-up frog with two different wheels, instead of back legs and without its left front foot. As part of Woody's plot to rescue Buzz from Sid, Woody orders, "Wind the frog!", at which point Pump Boy winds up the frog. When Ducky rings the doorbell, the frog is let out of Sid's room, allowing Scud to chase it down the stairs and out to the front porch, where Ducky catches it; Legs reels both toys up to safety.

==== Ducky ====
Ducky is a triple toy combination: a duck-headed Pez dispenser with a baby doll torso and a plunger base. He and Legs go to the front porch via the vent, and Ducky, suspended from the porch ceiling by Legs, swings toward the doorbell until he finally activates it, giving Woody the signal to release the frog. Ducky catches the frog as Legs reels both toys up to safety.

==== Jingle Joe ====
Jingle Joe is a Combat Carl head atop a jingling roller toy, with a severed Mickey Mouse arm nailed to the side for support. Jingle Joe first rolls out from under Sid's bed to fix Janie and the Pterodactyl. He notices Woody staring at them with a flashlight, so he turns it off, sending Woody running back to Buzz.

==== Combat Carl ====
Combat Carl is a G.I. Joe-like soldier action figure who Sid blows up with an explosive device. Combat Carl is Caucasian; a different character with the same name, who is African-American, appears in Toy Story of Terror!, Toy Story 4 (voiced by Carl Weathers in both cases) and Toy Story 5 (voiced by Ernie Hudson following Weathers's death).

==== Marie Antoinette and Her Little Sister ====
"Marie Antoinette" and "her little sister" are nicknames given to Hannah's two headless dolls by Buzz after he is found by Hannah, who makes him and her dolls drink some tea at a tea party. The dolls, being decapitated, cannot talk, but they do wave when Buzz mentions them to Woody. The two dolls are also always seen sitting next to a headless teddy bear.

== Introduced in Toy Story 2 ==
=== Al's Toy Barn ===
==== Ultra Buzz Lightyear ====
Ultra Buzz Lightyear, also known as Utility Belt Buzz, (voiced by Tim Allen) is a newer Buzz Lightyear toy found in the Buzz Lightyear aisle of Al's Toy Barn. He believes the original Buzz has escaped his box and captures him inside one. He is then mistaken for the original Buzz by Andy's toys and goes with them to rescue Woody, until he decides to join his father, Zurg.

==== Tour Guide Barbie ====
Tour guide Barbie (voiced by Jodi Benson) is a Barbie doll who gives Andy's toys a tour of Al's Toy Barn.

Tour Guide Barbie reappears at the end of the Toy Story 2 blooper reel; breaking the fourth wall, she bids farewell to the audience leaving the theater while reminding them to throw away their wrappers and drink containers. Once she realizes the audience has left, she drops her pleasant tour-guide smile and walks away to take a break.

==== Rock 'em Sock 'em Robots ====
A pair of Rock 'em Sock 'em Robots (voiced by John Lasseter and Lee Unkrich) appear in Al's office. When Slinky asks them if they have seen Woody, the two robots argue over which of them Slinky is addressing. They fight each other in a boxing match, with blue beating red.

=== Wheezy ===
Wheezy (speaking voice by Joe Ranft and by Phil LaMarr in Toy Story Mania and Toy Story 3: The Video Game and singing voice by Robert Goulet in Toy Story 2) is Andy's penguin squeeze toy that appears in Toy Story 2. He is introduced when Woody finds him on a shelf, after Andy accidentally ripped Woody's arm and his mom put him on a shelf where Wheezy had been placed after his squeaker broke, upsetting Andy. When Andy's mom plans to sell Wheezy at a yard sale, Woody tries to save him but gets left behind, leading to his being stolen by Al. At the end of the film, Wheezy tells Woody that the shark had an extra squeaker, allowing Wheezy to squeak normally again. Wheezy does not appear directly in Toy Story 3, except in footage of Andy as a young boy. Woody says that Wheezy was one of Andy's toys who went to new owners. Wheezy appears in the Toy Box mode in Toy Story 3: The Video Game.

=== The Cleaner ===
The Cleaner (voiced by Jonathan Harris) is an elderly specialist in toy restoration and repair with a fully loaded toy repair kit. He comes to Al's apartment to fix Woody in preparation for selling him to the toy museum in Japan. He insists that Al let him take his time with the work and views it as more than a simple job, asserting, "You can't rush art." Once he finishes the job, he tells Al that Woody is "for display only", while the quality of the repair overjoys Al. Visually, the Cleaner is identical to the chess player Geri from Geri's Game; the Cleaner's repair kit has a drawer full of chess pieces.

=== Emily ===
Emily is Jessie's former owner and is mentioned by her in the film. She appears in a flashback during the song "When She Loved Me" by Sarah McLachlan. As a young girl, she enjoyed playing with Jessie. However, as she got older, she became more interested in makeup and talking with her friends on the phone, causing her to forget about Jessie, who had fallen under her bed, for years. As a teenager, she rediscovers Jessie but promptly donates her to charity, leading Jessie to develop claustrophobia and a fear of abandonment.

In Toy Story 3, as Andy prepares to leave for college and the toys begin to worry about their future, Jessie describes the situation as "Emily all over again."

In Toy Story 5, a portrait of a now-adult Emily appears in an antique lunch box buried by Emily’s daughter as a time capsule. It is then revealed in the film that Emily named her daughter in honor of her toy rag doll Jessie, showing that Jessie still has an influence on Emily's life despite donating her.

=== Buster ===
Buster is Andy's pet dachshund, mentioned at the end of Toy Story as his Christmas present. In Toy Story 2, Buster is very energetic and friendly. He obeys commands given to him by Woody (although he does not obey orders from Andy), who uses Buster to rescue Wheezy from a yard sale. In Toy Story 3, Buster is now old, visibly aged, and overweight. Because of that, he is unable to help Woody rescue Andy's other toys and instead falls asleep. He stays with Mrs. Davis while Andy goes to college.

=== Crazy Critters ===
The Crazy Critters are the name given to several small animal cutouts that are friends of the Roundup Gang. They are often seen in the show Woody's Roundup accompanying the characters, as well as in several pieces of merchandise themed after the show. The Crazy Critters can also be found on Toy Story Midway Mania! as prizes won by the riders depending on their score. The critters also serve as the vehicles for Jessie's Critter Carousel, and some horse-shaped critters help pull a cart that people board in on the ride Woody's Round-Up.

== Introduced in Toy Story 3 ==
=== Molly's toys ===
==== Barbie ====
Barbara "Barbie" Roberts (voiced by Jodi Benson) is a Barbie doll who is one of the toys that Andy's sister Molly owns, until she decides to donate her to Sunnyside Daycare. She was modeled after the doll, Great Shape Barbie.

Barbie is initially upset about being donated alongside Mrs. Potato Head who cheers her up, but once at Sunnyside, Barbie meets Ken, who is as obsessed with fashion as she is. The two have a whirlwind romance and move into Ken's Dreamhouse together. Barbie later dumps Ken when she finds out he is a member of Lotso's gang. She allows herself to be imprisoned with Andy's toys as an act of loyalty. She later tricks Ken into showing her some of his clothes, only to attack and tie him up and interrogate him by ripping his clothes to learn what Lotso did to Buzz and how to return him to normal. He succumbs when she threatens to rip his prized Nehru jacket and tells her about the instruction manual and that Buzz was switched to Demo mode. She later takes a stand with Woody and the other toys against Lotso, impressing them with her articulate arguments. She and Ken reunite when he confesses his love and deflects to Woody's side, claiming Barbie is not just one of "a hundred million" as Lotso says, but unique and special to him. Barbie is the only one of Andy's toys not involved in the adventure at the dump, and she, Big Baby, and Ken later take over Sunnyside Daycare and reform it from a prison into a loving, welcoming family. She and the other Sunnyside toys maintain contact with Andy's other toys (whom he passed on to Bonnie) by slipping notes into Bonnie's backpack.

Barbie has a cameo appearance in Toy Story 4 during the flashback scene in Molly's room, in which she and two other Barbies help save RC. She also appears with Ken visiting Woody's toys in Hawaiian Vacation.

=== Sunnyside toys ===
==== Ken ====
Kenneth "Ken" Carson (voiced by Michael Keaton) is a smooth-talking Ken doll, who falls in love with Barbie at first sight. He lives in Ken's Dreamhouse, a big yellow dollhouse with three stories, a large wardrobe room, and an elevator. His appearance is based on a real Mattel Ken doll from 1988, called Animal Lovin' Ken.

Ken serves as one of the two secondary antagonists (alongside Big Baby) for most of the third film, but later reforms. He was originally one of Lotso's henchmen, which caused a temporary strain in his relationship with Barbie. He later turns on Lotso after understanding his true nature and encourages Lotso's crew to do the same. After Lotso's defeat, he and Barbie renew their relationship and become the new leaders of Sunnyside's toy population, keeping in touch with Bonnie's toys by sending letters home in Bonnie's backpack. He and Barbie later come to visit Bonnie's House in Hawaiian Vacation.

==== Big Baby ====
Big Baby (voiced by Woody Smith) is a baby doll with a lazy eye who carries around a bottle and is adorned with childlike scribbling that resembles tattoos. He is one of the two secondary antagonists (alongside Ken) for most of the third film, but later reforms. As a sentient toy, he has the biological traits of a human infant. He normally does not speak, instead communicating through baby sounds, except for one spoken line ("Mama") as the toys escape Sunnyside. He acts as Lotso's assistant and enforcer, helping guide the new toys around and punishing them when they misbehave. Daisy once owned him, Lotso, and Chuckles before they were left behind. When Lotso found that Daisy had replaced him, he convinced Big Baby and Chuckles that they would meet the same fate as he had, as they traveled to Sunnyside, where Lotso took over. Once Woody reveals Lotso's true nature, Big Baby realizes that Lotso had been using him and throws Lotso in the dumpster. He then helps Ken and Barbie reform Sunnyside and is last seen wearing a new outfit matching one of Ken's.

The baby who provided the voice for Big Baby is named "Woody", according to director Lee Unkrich, and the film's credits list him as Woody Smith.

==== Other Sunnyside toys ====
===== Twitch =====
Twitch (voiced by John Cygan) is a green Masters of the Universe-like insect action figure with a mantis' head composed of chomping mandibles, bumblebee-like wings, and two muscular arms, wearing red gloves, boots and underwear and a golden armor. He is a supporting antagonist, but later reforms. He serves as one of the toy thugs working for Lotso and helps to reprogram Buzz and apprehend Andy's other toys. He also operates a searchlight in the playground to look out for escaped toys. He later turns against Lotso after learning of his true nature. During the credits, he is seen living in a happier Sunnyside and is shown taking a turn to endure playtime with the young children in the Caterpillar Room, switching with Chunk so he can rest.

===== Stretch =====
Stretch (voiced by Whoopi Goldberg) is a purple toy rubber octopus. She is the only female member of Lotso's gang, and at first welcomes Andy's toys, but later helps capture them with her elastic arms. After they escape, she traps them near the edge of a garbage chute and is ready to push them into the dumpster if they do not admit defeat. She is seen visibly cringing at Lotso's true character being revealed. After understanding the true nature of Lotso, she turns on him. Eventually, Lotso orders Stretch to push the toys into the dumpster, but she is reluctant to do so. Lotso is then thrown into the dumpster by Big Baby for his lies and treachery, and Stretch immediately leaves the area. In the credits, she happily welcomes new toys and is later seen sneaking a message to Woody and his friends into Bonnie's backpack.

===== Chunk =====
Chunk (voiced by Jack Angel) is an orange rock monster toy with a face that can change through two expressions (happy and angry) and is one of Lotso's henchmen who eventually helps imprison Andy's toys. He later turns on Lotso after learning of his true nature. In the credits, he is seen enduring the abuse of the younger children, and later taking a rest while Twitch takes his place.

===== Sparks =====
Sparks (voiced by Jan Rabson) is a blue and silver toy robot reminiscent of a sparking-action Transformers toy at Sunnyside Daycare and one of Lotso's henchmen. He has only one line when he points out Chunk's low intelligence. He later turns against Lotso after learning of his true nature.

===== Chatter Telephone =====
Chatter Telephone (voiced by Teddy Newton) is a character based on the real-life toy of the same name. He can only speak when his receiver is lifted from its cradle. He has been at Sunnyside for many years and lives in a corner in the Caterpillar Room. He becomes an ally to Woody. When Woody returns to Sunnyside, Chatter Telephone says that coming back was a mistake because Lotso had since improved his security. He takes Woody to the window and explains that the trash chute is now the only way toys leave Sunnyside. Although his advice is to lie low, he reluctantly gives Woody instructions on how to escape from Sunnyside, placing particular emphasis on subduing the Monkey, who monitors the security cameras (which Woody and Slinky accomplish). For this, he is later beaten and broken by Lotso's gang for helping the toys escape until he finally talks. He apologizes to Woody. In the credits, he has been repaired and is shown happily attending a toy party in the Butterfly Room.

===== Bookworm =====
Bookworm (voiced by Richard Kind) is a green toy worm with a built-in flashlight who wears glasses. He keeps a library of instruction manuals in a closet at Sunnyside and gives Lotso the instruction manual for Buzz Lightyear. He later gives the same manual to Barbie (whom he mistakes for Ken because she is disguised in his spacesuit). In the credits, he is seen happily using his flashlight to light a disco ball during a party at Sunnyside. He only has two lines in the film. Bookworm is voiced by Richard Kind, who had previously done voice work for Pixar as Molt in A Bug's Life and Van in the Cars franchise and would later voice Bing Bong in Inside Out.

===== Monkey =====
The Monkey (vocal effects and provided by Lee Unkrich), based on the Musical Jolly Chimp toy from the 1960s, monitors the Sunnyside Daycare security cameras at night. Every time a toy tries to escape, the Monkey pushes a button that turns on the P.A. and screeches into it while banging his cymbals repeatedly, alerting Lotso and his gang like a security alarm. Chatter Telephone tells Woody that he must get rid of the Monkey before he and his friends can escape Sunnyside, as the Monkey can view cameras monitoring all areas of the daycare premises, including the playground. After an initial unsuccessful attempt to put a plastic black bag over the Monkey, Woody and Slinky manage to wrap him up in adhesive tape, and subsequently lock him in a filing cabinet. It is assumed that the Monkey somehow freed himself, alerted Lotso, and figured out that the Chatter Telephone helped them escape, leading to the confrontation at the dumpster. In the credits, the Monkey is still monitoring the security cameras, but is seen happily playing his cymbals while wearing star-shaped sunglasses.

===== Some basic Lego minifigures =====
Some basic Lego minifigures. They have yellow skin and wear plain clothing in different colors.

===== Jack-in-the-box Toy =====
A jack-in-the-box toy (voiced by Lee Unkrich) has two lines in the film when he greets Andy's toys, and later Zurg and a few other toys during the credits, exclaiming, "New toys!"

=== Anderson family ===
==== Bonnie Anderson ====
Bonnie Anderson (voiced by Emily Hahn in Toy Story 3, short films, and television specials, Madeleine McGraw in Toy Story 4, and Scarlett Spears in Toy Story 5) is one of the children who attends Sunnyside Daycare, where her mother is the receptionist. In Toy Story 3, Andy donates his toys to her before he leaves for college. In the short film Hawaiian Vacation, Bonnie goes on a vacation to Hawaii and leaves Barbie and Ken in her room. In Toy Story of Terror!, she and her mother are stranded at a motel, and she later discovers that the manager has been stealing her toys to sell online. In Toy Story That Time Forgot, it is revealed that Bonnie has scheduled play dates with a friend named Mason in a neighboring house. In Small Fry, Bonnie forgets Buzz in a fast-food restaurant's ball pit and does not notice that the mini-buzz has taken his place. Partysaurus Rex reveals that Bonnie has an extensive collection of bath toys, and that the regular toys fear being included in her bath time. In Toy Story 4, Bonnie creates a toy called Forky out of trash on her first day of kindergarten.

==== Mrs. Anderson ====
Mrs. Anderson (voiced by Lori Alan) is Bonnie's mother, the receptionist at Sunnyside Daycare, and a friend of Andy's family.

In Small Fry, she takes Bonnie to a fast-food chicken restaurant named Poultry Palace and inadvertently takes the wrong Buzz Lightyear toy when they depart. In Toy Story of Terror!, she and Bonnie stay at a motel, and she calls the police to arrest the manager after discovering he has been stealing toys from customers to sell them online. She also appears in Toy Story 4 and Toy Story 5.

=== Bonnie's toys ===
==== Chuckles ====
Chuckles (voiced by Bud Luckey) is a brokenhearted blue-haired toy clown who was once owned by Daisy, alongside Lotso and Big Baby. After he, Big Baby and Lotso were lost in the countryside, Chuckles lived at Sunnyside for many years before being broken and later taken home by Bonnie. He kept the pendant Big Baby used to wear, with Daisy's name on it; he later lent it to Woody, before Lotso eventually destroyed it. Chuckles returns in the short film Hawaiian Vacation, where he sings a Hawaiian song while playing a ukulele as Barbie and Ken embark on their recreated Hawaiian adventures. He does not appear in the fourth film, possibly due to Bud Luckey's retirement and death before production began.

==== Mr. Pricklepants ====
Mr. Pricklepants (voiced by Timothy Dalton in Toy Story 3 and Toy Story 4, Robin Atkin Downes in Forky Asks a Question, John Hopkins in Toy Story 5) is a stuffed hedgehog. He wears lederhosen and a Tyrolean hat and views himself as an actor. Throughout Toy Story 3, he expresses great interest in theater arts and takes role-playing as a child's toy very seriously. Buttercup sarcastically refers to him as "Baron von Shush" because he silences the other toys when they break character. During the credits, he plays Romeo in a play of Romeo and Juliet, with one of the alien toys playing Juliet.

==== Trixie ====
Trixie (voiced by Kristen Schaal) is a blue toy Triceratops. She chats online with "a dinosaur toy down the street" who goes by the name "Velocistar237". During the credits, she and Rex play a game cooperatively on a computer. She is a central character in Toy Story That Time Forgot.

Trixie appears in Toy Story 3, Toy Story 4, Toy Story 5, and Toy Story That Time Forgot.

==== Buttercup ====
Buttercup (voiced by Jeff Garlin) is a stuffed white unicorn. Despite his name and appearance, he has a very gruff voice and a sarcastic personality. He is the first to introduce himself to Woody when Bonnie brings him home. He later appears in the film's end credits, having befriended the similarly sardonic Hamm.

Buttercup appears in the films Toy Story 3, Toy Story 4, and as a silent character in Toy Story 5. He also appears in the Hawaiian Vacation short film and the Forky Asks a Question miniseries.

==== Dolly ====
Dolly (voiced by Bonnie Hunt) is a soft dress-up rag doll and the leader of Bonnie's toys. In the Toy Story 3 video game, she is seen as a witch. In Toy Story 5, Bonnie draws glasses on her.

==== Peas-in-a-Pod ====
Peas-in-a-Pod (voiced by Charlie Bright, Amber Kroner, and Brianna Maiwand) are three plush green peas in a green zip-up case that looks like a pea pod. They have the personalities of small children, and their names are Peaty, Peatrice, and Peanelope. The Peas-in-a-Pod reappear in the short films Hawaiian Vacation and Small Fry, voiced by Zoe Levin. They do not appear in Toy Story 4, other than the drawing of them Bonnie had from the previous film, and the cameo on "We Got a Friend in Me". They were most recently featured in the final episode of the short-form series Forky Asks a Question, voiced by Addison Andrews, Mika Crespo, and Imani Prior.

==== Totoro ====
Totoro is a plush toy of the titular character from Studio Ghibli's My Neighbor Totoro. He does not speak during the film, nor is he spoken to. According to the tie-in book, The Art of Toy Story 3, Totoro's appearance in the film was intended as a tribute to Hayao Miyazaki, who is a close friend of former Pixar executive John Lasseter. In addition to Lasseter's relationship to Miyazaki, another factor that contributed to Totoro's appearance was Disney's role in dubbing Studio Ghibli films for their English-language releases. He does not appear in Toy Story 4 or Toy Story 5.

=== Daisy ===
Daisy is a little girl who appears in flashbacks. She owned Lotso, Big Baby, and Chuckles, but accidentally left them behind at a rest area along the road. To pacify her, Daisy's parents bought her another Lots-o'-Huggin' Bear rather than going to find Lotso and the rest of her toys, which made Lotso think he had been forgotten about, and changed him into a sinister, ruthless toy. Lotso lied to Big Baby, claiming Daisy had replaced all of them and had made him come to Sunnyside to take it over. Chuckles keeps Big Baby's lost pendant; however, it is revealed that Big Baby still loves Daisy, much to Lotso's dismay, when he sees the pendant again (which he promptly destroys with his mallet).

=== Dump truck toys ===
Frog (voiced by Jack Willis) is a toy attached to the front of a dumpster truck, along with a Cat toy and a Ghost toy, where Lotso is also placed after he is discovered at the Tri-County Landfill by a waste collector.

== Introduced in Toy Story 4 ==
=== Mr. Anderson ===
Mr. Anderson (voiced by Jay Hernandez) is Bonnie's father. He drives the family RV in Toy Story 4. He appears briefly in Toy Story 3, but does not have any lines, nor is his face clearly seen until Toy Story 4. He returns in Toy Story 5, where his name is revealed to be Walter, as his wife calls him.

=== Bonnie's toys ===
==== Karen Beverly ====
Karen Beverly (voiced by Melissa Villaseñor) is a sentient plastic knife with googly eyes and pipe cleaner arms. Like Forky, she was created by Bonnie and initially considers herself trash. She appears in a mid-credits scene, in which Jessie introduces her after Bonnie's first day in first grade. Forky instantly falls in love with her. They get married in Toy Story 5, with some of the star stickers on her later used as deputy badges for Buzz and Woody.

==== Melephant Brooks, Chairol Burnett, Bitey White, and Carl Reineroceros ====
Melephant Brooks (voiced by Mel Brooks), Chairol Burnett (voiced by Carol Burnett), Bitey White (voiced by Betty White), and Carl Reineroceros (voiced by Carl Reiner) are four of Bonnie's old baby toys. They no longer get played with by Bonnie and thus are stashed away in her closet. Melephant is a blue elephant, Chairol is a green toddler's chair, Bitey is a teether in the form of a tiger, and Carl is a purple rhinoceros. Each toy has visible damage from wear and tear, including crayon scribbles, scratches, bite marks, and paint wearing away. Each of the four toys' names is a pun on its voice actor (all of whom were elderly at the time of the film's production & release).

=== Carnival toys ===
==== Giggle McDimples ====
Officer Giggle McDimples (voiced by Ally Maki) is a miniature toy cop who accompanies Bo Peep. She lives inside a folding compact similar in concept to Polly Pocket.

Giggle McDimples appears in Toy Story 4 and Toy Story 5.

==== Bunny ====
Bunny (voiced by Jordan Peele) is a blue and green stuffed bunny with purple glitter eyes, and a carnival prize who wants to be won.

Bunny appears in Toy Story 4 and Toy Story 5.

==== Ducky ====
Ducky (voiced by Keegan-Michael Key) is a stuffed yellow duck with pink glitter eyes and a carnival prize. He is friends (and stuck) with Bunny and also wants to be won.

Ducky appears in Toy Story 4 and Toy Story 5.

==== Duke Caboom ====
Duke Caboom (voiced by Keanu Reeves) is an amiable Canadian daredevil toy with a white outfit, a horseshoe mustache, and a toy motorcycle. He suffers from low self-esteem due to believing that he let down his previous owner Rejean, unable to do the stunts that his commercial ads had promised. Duke Caboom is a parody of the Evel Knievel Rally Stunt Cycle by the Ideal Toy Company.

Duke Caboom appears in Toy Story 4 and Toy Story 5.

=== Second Chance Antiques ===
==== Margaret ====
Margaret (voiced by June Squibb) is the owner of Second Chance Antiques.

==== Gabby Gabby ====
Gabby Gabby (voiced by Christina Hendricks) is a 1950s pullstring doll with a broken voice box, the result of a manufacturing defect, who lives in Second Chance Antiques. She serves as the former main antagonist of the fourth film, having become bitter at being in the store for decades and not being wanted due to her broken voice box. During her time in the store, she has become like a godfather, with a set of ventriloquist dummies as her henchmen. Woody eventually gives her his voice box in return for Forky's freedom and persuades her to leave herself in a place where a lost young girl can find her and take her home.

According to director Josh Cooley, Gabby was inspired by the Talky Tina doll from The Twilight Zone episode "Living Doll", who in turn was inspired by the Chatty Cathy line of talking dolls. Cooley also cites Vito Corleone from The Godfather film series as an influence for Gabby's control over the dummies who served as her enforcers.

==== The Dummies ====
The Dummies (both voiced by Steve Purcell) are non-speaking ventriloquist dummies who work as Gabby Gabby's henchmen, patrolling Second Chance Antiques. Gabby Gabby's personal aide is a dummy named Benson, the one with a red bowtie.

The dummies are partially based on Slappy the Dummy from Goosebumps.

==== Tinny ====
Tinny is a small, music-making tin toy that is the owner of a club for antique toys hidden inside a pinball machine. Tinny is actually the main character of the 1988 Pixar short Tin Toy. Tinny was also planned to be the main protagonist of Toy Story until he was replaced by what would become the basis for Buzz Lightyear.

=== Harmony ===
Harmony (voiced by Lila Sage Bromley) is the granddaughter of Margaret. Gabby Gabby hopes to obtain a new voice box to get Harmony's attention, but even after Woody gives Gabby his voice box, Harmony still shows no interest.

=== Harmony's mother ===
Harmony's mother (voiced by Patricia Arquette) is the unnamed mother of Harmony.

=== Rejean ===
Rejean is a boy who appears in flashbacks. Duke Caboom is given to Rejean for Christmas, but because TV toy commercials greatly exaggerated Duke's abilities, Rejean is seemingly disappointed when Duke is unable to jump through hoops, and thus throws Duke away on Boxing Day, believing he is defective. When Duke Caboom and Woody are on a mission to rescue Forky and Bo Peep's sheep, Duke hallucinates an angry Rejean's head watching him, and loses control.

== Introduced in Toy Story 5 ==
=== Lilypad ===
Lilypad (voiced by Greta Lee) is a green frog-shaped high-tech tablet. An attractive device of Bonnie's, she becomes a minor and conclusive antagonist to the toys. She is loosely based on the LeapFrog line of electronics, particularly the LeapPad line of children's tablet computers. LeapFrog themselves went on to produce tie-in merchandise based on Lilypad.

=== Smarty Pants ===
Smarty Pants (voiced by Conan O'Brien) is a white wisecracking toilet-training tech toy placed in Blaze's old abandoned toy house. He is mostly accompanied by a blue sticky hand toy.

=== Atlas ===
Atlas (voiced by Craig Robinson) is a blue GPS-themed hippo toy equipped with navigation-style features.

=== Snappy ===
Snappy (voiced by Shelby Rabara) is a pink one eyed camera-themed toy able to capture photos and record moments during play.

=== Dr. Nutcase ===
Dr. Nutcase (voiced by Matty Matheson) is a peanut daredevil toy who fears technology.

=== Blaze Manoukian ===
Blaze Manoukian (voiced by Mykal-Michelle Harris) is a 9-year-old girl living on a farm that used to belong to Emily. She loves animals and has an active imagination similar to Bonnie's. Thanks to Jessie, Smarty Pants, Atlas, Snappy, and Lilypad, Blaze becomes friends with Bonnie by the end of the film.

==== Jimmy Dean ====
Jimmy Dean is Blaze's pet Berkshire pig. His name is based on the Jimmy Dean sasauge brand.

=== Chelsea, Heidi and Kara ===
Chelsea, Heidi and Kara are three girls in Bonnie's neighborhood who dislike toys, play extensively with tablet devices and bully Bonnie for still playing with toys, and are supporting and conclusive antagonists, prompting her parents to get Lilypad for her. They are seen to have models based on a Ladybug, Bluebird, and Beaver respectively.

== Introduced in Lightyear ==
=== Izzy Hawthorne ===
Izzy Hawthorne (voiced by Keke Palmer and Keira Hairston) is the granddaughter of Alisha, whom Buzz meets in the future as a result of multiple hyper-speed tests. She is the leader of Junior Zap Patrol, a volunteer team of cadets training to become protectors of the nascent society that has taken shape on the planet.

=== Sox ===
Sox (voiced by Peter Sohn) is a robotic cat and Buzz's personal companion. A gift from Alisha after his first hyper-speed test, Socks is programmed to provide personal and emotional support for Buzz and is equipped with some accessories. Despite being programmed with artificial intelligence, he occasionally shows traits similar to a real cat, including expressing satisfaction at being petted and getting distracted by laser pointers.

=== Mo Morrison ===
Maurice Mo Morrison (voiced by Taika Waititi) is a naive, neurotic space cadet who Buzz befriends.

=== Darby Steel ===
Darby Steel (voiced by Dale Soules) is an elderly space cadet and paroled criminal whom Buzz befriends. Initially serving a prison sentence, she joins the Junior Zap Patrol in exchange for having her sentence reduced. She is an explosives expert.

=== Alisha Hawthorne ===
Alisha Hawthorne (voiced by Uzo Aduba) was Buzz Lightyear's best friend and commanding officer. She is one of Izzy's grandmothers. Initially exploring the planet of T'Kani Prime with Buzz and newly recruited Featheringstam, the three of them are forced to abort after learning of the planet's hostile life forms. Because of time dilation from Buzz's multiple hyper-speed tests, Alisha dies of old age and leaves a recording for Buzz, saying she is sorry she will not get to see him finish the mission.

=== Commander Burnside ===
Commander Calvin "Cal" Burnside (voiced by Isiah Whitlock Jr.) is Alisha Hawthorne's successor.

== Other projects ==
=== Hawaiian Vacation ===
==== Captain Zip ====
Captain Zip (voiced by Angus MacLane) is a keychain airplane captain that is attached to the zipper of Bonnie's backpack. He is mistaken for an actual captain by Ken, who wants to go to Hawaii, to which Captain Zip responds that he just zips and unzips.

==== A Lego man and a Lego woman ====
A Lego man and a Lego woman come with Barbie and Ken in Bonnie's backpack to help them unpack their luggage. Since they do not arrive in Hawaii, the Lego people stay in Bonnie's room.

=== Small Fry ===
==== Neptuna ====
Neptuna (voiced by Jane Lynch) is a mermaid toy from the "Mermaid Battle Squadron" tie-in line from the summer of 1998. She leads the support-group meetings for the discarded Fun Meal toys.

==== T-Bone ====
T-Bone (voiced by Angus MacLane) is a Transformer-like humanoid robot steak toy from the "Steak Force" line, which battles the "Vegetarians". He's the co-leader of the discarded Fun Meal toys.

==== DJ Blu-Jay ====
DJ Blu-Jay (voiced by Bret Parker) is a small blue jay toy wearing a set of headphones and standing at a turntable on top of a tree trunk.

==== Lizard Wizard ====
Lizard Wizard (voiced by Josh Cooley) is a small lime green lizard toy with a white beard, a violet wizard hat, and a wizard robe. He is paired up with Buzz Lightyear until Buzz drops him and, with the assistance of Gary Grappling Hook, escapes, leaving him upset.

==== Bozu the Ninja Clown ====
Bozu the Ninja Clown is a toy combination of a clown and a ninja. Being a clown, his name is slightly reminiscent of Bozo the Clown.

==== Vlad ====
Vlad (voiced by Jess Harnell) is a vampire wearing a train driver's hat who rides in a purple steam engine. He was discarded because "nobody wanted to board the Vampire Express."

==== Gary Grappling Hook ====
Gary Grappling Hook (voiced by Angus MacLane) is a green toy gun with hands and legs and a blue grappling hook in place of a face. Buzz uses him to escape the toy psychotherapy meeting when he was paired up with Lizard Wizard.

==== Tae-Kwon-Doe ====
Tae-Kwon Doe (voiced by Lori Alan) is an anthropomorphic karate deer toy. At one point, Neptuna sees her hoof raised and thinks she is raising her hand. When Neptuna calls on her, Tae-Kwon Doe explains that it is simply her play feature, at which point her hoof goes down, hitting the plastic board that is a part of her base and "breaking" it. Her name is a play on "Taekwondo".

==== Super Pirate ====
Super Pirate (voiced by Angus MacLane) is a pirate-themed superhero with an eyepatch on his left eye and a peg leg replacing the lower part of his left leg.

==== Beef Stewardess ====
Beef Stewardess is an anthropomorphic cow dressed as a stewardess.

==== Nervous Sys-Tim ====
Nervous Sys-Tim (voiced by Kitt Hirasaki) is a clear plastic human figure displaying many body parts such as the brain, the eyes, and the nervous system. He was discarded because nobody wanted to see an accurate depiction of the human nervous system while eating.

==== Ghost Burger ====
Ghost Burger (voiced by Jason Topolski) is a plastic hamburger wearing a stereotypical ghost sheet.

==== Koala Kopter ====
Koala Kopter (voiced by Carlos Alazraqui) is a plastic, Australian-accented koala on a green helicopter with a propeller on top of his hat who is part of the "Down Undermals" set. He was replaced with a Kangaroo Kanoe toy.

==== Roxy Boxy ====
Roxy Boxy (voiced by Emily Forbes) is a boxing-themed turtle. She was recalled because her boxing glove hands could shoot out and injure children, making her defective. This occurs during the meeting, when she hits Lizard Wizard twice.

==== Recycle Ben ====
Recycle Ben (voiced by Peter Sohn) is a blue recycling bin with eyes and white arms who says he was "recycled."

==== Funky Monk ====
Funky Monk (voiced by Angus MacLane) is an overweight monk with sunglasses and a golden chain with his initials around his neck.

==== Condorman ====
Condorman (voiced by Bob Bergen) is a condor-themed superhero who appears in his vehicle, a yellow racecar. He is an allusion to the 1981 film Condorman.

==== Franklin ====
Franklin (voiced by Jim Ward) is a bald eagle sitting on a rolled-up car version of the U.S. Constitution, which supports a feather pen on the back of it, and the wheels are made up of quarters. He does not understand why children dislike him because he is "history, but on wheels."

==== Pizza Bot ====
Pizza Bot (voiced by Jason Topolski) is a blue pizza box-headed robot whose right hand holds a pizza, while his left hand is a pizza cutter. It reads "PIZZABOT5000" on his chest. Children do not like him, which makes him sad.

==== Mini Buzz Lightyear ====
Mini Buzz Lightyear (voiced by Teddy Newton) is a small version of Buzz Lightyear who replaces the real Buzz when he ends up in the Poultry Palace ball pit. He fools Rex into thinking he is the real Buzz, but the other toys know he is an impostor. By the end of the short, Mini Buzz has become part of the support group for the discarded Fun Meal toys.

==== Mini Zurg ====
Mini Zurg (voiced by Jess Harnell) is a small version of Zurg. He warns Mini Buzz not to escape from the display and go into the ball pit. Mini Zurg is later seen talking to the electronic belt buckle, much to his delight.

==== Light-up Zurg Belt buckle ====
A light-up Zurg belt buckle is initially given to Bonnie as her Fun Meal toy, much to her disappointment due to Poultry Palace running out of Mini Buzz toys. Later, Mini Zurg is seen with the one in the display as his companion. It communicates using Simon-like beeps, yet Mini Zurg can understand it.

=== Partysaurus Rex ===
==== Captain Suds ====
Captain Suds (voiced by Corey Burton) is a boat toy with a sailor face and a headlamp who serves as the leader of the bath toys. He speaks like a pirate. Captain Suds also appears in Toy Story 5.

==== Chuck E. Duck ====
Chuck E. Duck (voiced by Tony Cox and Don Fullilove) is a rubber duckie who serves as Captain Suds's assistant.

==== Drips ====
Drips (voiced by Mark Walsh) is a blue whale faucet cover.

==== Babs ====
Babs (voiced by Lori Richardson) is a blue octopus bath toy in a soap bar.

==== Cuddles ====
Cuddles (voiced by Sherry Lynn) is an alligator bath toy who can squirt water.

==== Helga von Bubble Bath ====
Helga Von Bubble Bath is a Viking bubble bath bottle. Her helmet is used by Rex, who throws her into the bathtub to add more bubbles.

==== Dolphina ====
Dolphina is a pink dolphin toy that lights up. Rex knocks her in, along with several of her friends, to create a light show.

==== Toy Robot ====
A toy robot with suction cups that allow it to stick to the wall, which plays music for the bath toys.

=== Toy Story of Terror! ===
==== Combat Carl Sr. ====
Combat Carl Sr. (voiced by Carl Weathers and Ernie Hudson) is a G.I. Joe-esque action figure. He is African-American in appearance, unlike the Caucasian character of the same name who briefly appeared in the first film. He is encountered by Jessie after all her friends have been captured, having eluded Mr. Jones, though he lost a hand in the process. Carl is extremely paranoid and refers to himself in the third person, but later helps Jessie overcome her fears to save everyone. He was owned by a boy named Billy, to whom he is determined to return. Three Combat Carl variants later appear in Toy Story 4, which would be Weathers's final film role before he died in 2024. Another Combat Carl variant appeared in Toy Story 5, voiced by Ernie Hudson.

===== Combat Carl Jr. =====
Combat Carl Jr. (voiced by Carl Weathers) is a miniature version of Combat Carl who has a close relationship with his larger self.

==== LEGO Bunny ====
LEGO Bunny is a yellow bunny with a scarf that is made up of LEGO bricks, allowing him to transform into different LEGO structures.

==== Old Timer ====
Old Timer (voiced by Christian Roman) is an elderly toy alarm clock with a moustache and a beard. He helps track the time for the toys' escape plan. Old Timer would later reappear in Toy Story 4 (voiced by Alan Oppenheimer).

==== Pocketeer ====
Pocketeer (voiced by Ken Marino) is part of an action figure line known as the Fastener Four; the Pocketeer has an outfit covered in pockets in which he keeps various helpful items. His fellows, Zipper Man, Snaps, and Speed Lacer, were sold by Ron before the capture of Bonnie's toys.

==== Pez Cat ====
Pez Cat (voiced by Kate McKinnon) is a Pez dispenser whose head is that of a cat wearing glasses, and who serves as the lookout for the trapped toys.

==== Transitron ====
Transitron (voiced by Peter Sohn) is a Transformers-esque transforming robot who splits into five vehicle components. Jessie freed Transitron from the box he was to be shipped in, then had him seal her inside so she could rescue Woody. Transitron later joined up with the other stolen toys and departed the Sleep Well.

=== Toy Story That Time Forgot ===
==== Mason ====
Mason (voiced by R.C. Cope) is Bonnie's friend, and a post-Christmas playdate between the pair serves as the setting for the special. Mason receives a Battlesaurs toy collection for Christmas, but is distracted from it by a new video game system. However, due to Trixie and Reptillus's efforts, he abandons the video game and plays with his new toys. He is later shown writing his name on his toys in a manner similar to Andy and Bonnie.

==== Battlesaurus ====
Battlesaurs are a group of mostly humanoid dinosaur toys who initially believe themselves to be real beings rather than playthings. This illusion is encouraged by Mason's greater interest in a new video game system he received for Christmas, and they become hostile toward Mason's other toys and toward Bonnie's when they are brought over for a playdate. However, Trixie eventually convinces them that being played with brings its own joy, and they happily embrace their lives as toys.

===== Reptillus Maximus =====
Reptillus Maximus (voiced by Kevin McKidd) is the Champion of the Battlesaurs, who is fascinated by Trixie after meeting her. Initially, Reptillus is resistant to the idea of being a plaything, believing that submitting to his child's will would be a surrender and dishonorable. However, Trixie later helps him to see that being there for Mason is honorable, and he helps her divert Mason's attention to his new toys. Near the end of Toy Story That Time Forgot, it is implied that he has a crush on Trixie. Reptillus has a cameo in Toy Story 4 as his picture is seen on a lunchbox in Bonnie's kindergarten class.

===== Ray-Gon =====
Ray-Gon (voiced by Jonathan Kydd) is the armorer of the Battlesaurs. His main contribution is providing Trixie and Rex with battle armor, with the latter featuring remote-control arms that the Cleric uses to manipulate Rex.

===== Goliathon =====
The Goliathon is a large creature used by the other Battlesaurs to imprison their enemies in its belly.

==== Angel Kitty ====
Angel Kitty (voiced by Emma Hudak) is a cat ornament on Bonnie's Christmas tree. Bonnie briefly uses Angel Kitty during playtime, portraying her as a dinosaur. A running gag in the special is Angel Kitty giving a moral lesson about Christmas, much to the other toys' dismay and joy. Angel Kitty has a small horn and a halo. In her final scene, she delivers a moral lesson to Bonnie's toys before vanishing.

=== Forky Asks a Question ===
==== Rib Tickles ====
Rib Tickles (voiced by Aloma Wright) is a toy dog Pet Patrol officer who Forky meets. A male version of the character was originally set to appear in Toy Story 4, although it was ultimately deleted.
