= Toy Story Racer =

2001 video game

- Game Boy Color cover art, depicting Buzz, Woody and Rex
- Developers: Traveller's Tales (PS); Tiertex Design Studios (GBC)
- Publisher: Activision
- Series: Toy Story
- Platforms: Game Boy Color; PlayStation
- Release: NA: March 2, 2001; EU: March 23, 2001 (PS); EU: March 9, 2002 (GBC)
- Genre: Racing
- Modes: Single-player, multiplayer

Toy Story Racer is a 2001 kart racing game developed by Traveller's Tales and Tiertex Design Studios and published by Activision. It was based on the Toy Story franchise, primarily the first film. The game was released in March 2001 for the Game Boy Color and PlayStation systems. The PlayStation version received "generally favorable reviews" according to Metacritic, and has been re-released through emulation in subsequent years.

== Gameplay ==
The PlayStation and Game Boy Color versions of Toy Story Racer are distinct from each other. The PlayStation version of Toy Story Racer features 12 playable characters from the first film:

- Woody
- Buzz Lightyear
- Bo Peep
- RC
- Mr. Potato Head
- Slinky Dog
- Hamm
- Rex
- Little Green Man
- Rocky Gibraltar
- Lenny
- Babyface

There are 200 soldiers to collect throughout the PlayStation version, gained by competing in the different types of races. Eight of the 12 characters must be unlocked by earning the required number of soldiers for that respective character. The initially unlocked characters are: Woody, Buzz, Bo Peep, and RC.

In the Game Boy Color version, the unlocked characters are Woody, Buzz, Bo Peep, and Mr. Potato Head. The game includes two unlockable characters: a little green man and an army soldier.

=== Racing types ===
The Game Boy Color version has only two race modes, Quick Race and Tournament, while the PlayStation version features the following race modes:

- Race - a regular race in which the player must finish in first place to be awarded a soldier (some races range in the number of laps and number of opponents).
- Race Tournament - a race tournament where each position is awarded points; the winner is the toy with the most points.
- Knockout Race - a knockout-style race, where the toy in last place on every lap is eliminated.
- Knockout Race Tournaments - a knockout-style tournament, where toys are eliminated at the end of every race.
- Lap Trial - completing the lap within the time limit to win.
- Endurance - completing a number of laps within a time limit.
- Collection - collecting the hidden clown weebles scattered throughout the track before the time runs out.
- Target - Finding and destroying the hidden dart boards with weapons scattered throughout the track before the time runs out.
- Countdown Mode - The player must complete a number of races within a time limit.
- Survival - Finishing a race in first place without getting hit by a weapon, which results in elimination.
- Super Survival - same as Survival, but the player must eliminate the other toys to win.
- Tag Mode - to win, the player must bump other players with their car.
- Smash Tag - same as Tag Mode, but players are eliminated with weapons, not by crashing.
- Smash - a race in which the player must defeat a specific group of opponents by using power-ups to knock them out.
- Smash Tournament - the player must knock out other racers by using power-ups. A point is rewarded for each character that the player knocks out.

Some of these game modes can also be played in reverse, in which the racers compete backwards on the course. The PlayStation version features more than 100 challenges, each of them utilizing one of the various game modes. Challenges are gradually unlocked as the player collects more soldiers.

=== Levels and items ===
The PlayStation version has 18 tracks: 11 race tracks and 7 smash arenas. Race tracks include Andy's house, Andy's neighborhood, a shopping mall, a pier, the Pizza Planet restaurant, an underground parking lot, and Sid's house. Smash arenas include a basketball court, a bowling alley, a cinema, a gas station, and an ice rink. A skate park level serves as both a race track and a smash arena. The PlayStation version includes eight items that can be used against opponents, including a spinning top, a rocket, electroshock, and a speed booster. Items are found in four different coloured boxes located throughout each track, and two items are contained in each box.

The Game Boy Color version has 10 tracks across three locations: Andy's house, Andy's neighborhood, and Pizza Planet. The tracks in the GBC version are pre-rendered as full motion video, allowing for a 3D effect. The character sprites are overlaid on the video and move forward automatically with the track, while the player controls the steering of the chosen character. Icons are located on the track and can be collected by the player, resulting in a random effect on the player's vehicle. The icons can slow down the vehicle, or can aid the player by providing abilities such as invincibility or temporary top speed. Coins are scattered on the track as well, and can be collected by the player to increase the high score.

== Release ==
In the United States, Toy Story Racer was released for PlayStation and Game Boy Color in March 2001. In 2010, the game was digitally re-released on the PlayStation Store as a PS one Classic for PlayStation 3 and PlayStation Portable. The re-release was published in the United States on July 27, followed by a European release on August 25. The re-release became compatible with the PlayStation Vita on August 29, 2012. Both versions of the game were re-released in 2026 as part of the Toy Story: Retro Roundup! compilation.

== Reception ==
Reception

Aggregate scores
Aggregator	Score	
Aggregator	GBC	PS
GameRankings	63%	74%
Metacritic	N/A	76/100

Review scores
Publication	Score	
Publication	GBC	PS
AllGame	2.5/5	3/5
Electronic Gaming Monthly	N/A	5.17/10 (Note: Three critics of Electronic Gaming Monthly gave the PlayStation version each a score of 5/10, 4.5/10, and 6/10.)
Game Informer	4/10	5/10
GameRevolution	N/A	C
GameSpot	6.8/10	6.9/10
GameZone	N/A	10/10
IGN	7/10	8.2/10
Next Generation	N/A	2/5
Nintendo Power	3/5	N/A
Official U.S. PlayStation Magazine	N/A	3/5
The Cincinnati Enquirer	N/A	4/5

The PlayStation version received "generally favorable reviews" according to aggregator website Metacritic, based on 8 reviews. It was generally praised for its graphics and appeal to people of all ages. IGN's review stated: "Toy Story Racer is aimed at young kids, but it's surprisingly adult in the level of detail, depth of gameplay, and its overall design", whilst Tim Tracy of GameSpot remarked that "it's no Crash Team Racing, but Toy Story Racer provides plenty of challenge for young and old alike." Tracy also praised the controls for their simplicity. Kevin Rice of NextGen, however, gave it a negative review, saying, "Clearly, this is aimed at the youngest gamers. More discerning consumers – say, over the age of 10 – will not be impressed."

Jon Thompson of AllGame praised the PlayStation version for its variety but considered the graphics and sound to be average, while Johnny Liu of GameRevolution wrote that the game "force feeds you with endless repetition". Liu criticized the over-sensitive controls, but considered the music decent. Although Liu enjoyed some of the tracks, he considered it an average game and believed that Crash Team Racing was superior. Aaron Curtiss of the Los Angeles Times praised the same console version and considered it superior to the GBC version; he criticized the latter version as tedious and was disappointed by its reduced number of tracks and game modes. Curtiss was also critical of the two different versions being released with an identical title and packaging. Four-Eyed Dragon of GamePro called the same console version "a decent kart filled with enough variety to keep beginner drivers busy for a while. Veteran kart racers, however, should rent first." (Note: GamePro gave the PlayStation version three 3.5/5 scores for graphics, sound, and fun factor, and 4.5/5 for control.)

Thompson, in his review of the GBC version, praised the 3D graphics but wrote that "it is obviously not true 3D, and the frame rate is low enough to disorient you on many occasions". Thompson further stated that the game had low replay value because of its lack of diverse characters, game modes, and tracks. IGN's Craig Harris also criticized the GBC version for its lack of variety, and stated that the game was fun for only a limited period. Frank Provo of GameSpot stated that the GBC version had good replay value. Provo believed that Wacky Races and Woody Woodpecker Racing were "much better" alternatives, but wrote that the 3D graphics and "cartoon-style charm" of Toy Story Racer "make it an excellent choice for children, Disney fans, or Game Boy fanatics who enjoy visual gimmicks".

In 2019, the PlayStation version was included on IGN's list of Top 25 Favourite Kart Racers.
