= Hawaiian Vacation =

2011 Pixar short directed by Gary Rydstrom

- Directed by: Gary Rydstrom
- Screenplay by: Erik Benson; Jason Katz; Gary Rydstrom
- Story by: Erik Benson; Christian Roman
- Produced by: Galyn Susman
- Starring: Tom Hanks; Tim Allen; Joan Cusack; Don Rickles; Estelle Harris; Wallace Shawn; John Ratzenberger; Blake Clark; Jeff Pidgeon; Jodi Benson; Michael Keaton; Timothy Dalton; Jeff Garlin; Kristen Schaal; Bonnie Hunt; Bud Luckey
- Edited by: Axel Geddes
- Music by: Mark Mothersbaugh
- Production company: Pixar Animation Studios
- Distributed by: Walt Disney Studios Motion Pictures
- Release date: June 24, 2011 (with Cars 2)
- Running time: 6 minutes
- Country: United States
- Language: English

Toy Story Toons: Hawaiian Vacation is a 2011 American animated short film produced by Pixar Animation Studios and directed by Gary Rydstrom. The first entry in the Toy Story Toons series, the short features characters from the Toy Story films and takes place after the events of Toy Story 3. It premiered in theaters with Pixar's Cars 2, and was included on the film's home video release.

== Plot ==
Three months after the events of Toy Story 3, it is Bonnie's winter break from school, and she is celebrating by going on vacation to Hawaii. While the toys begin to enjoy having her bedroom to themselves, she leaves her school backpack in her room, and Ken and Barbie reveal themselves to have stowed away, hoping to join her in Hawaii.

They initially believe that they are in Hawaii, but Woody reveals to them that they are actually in Bonnie's room. After Mr. Potato Head questions his logic for thinking that Bonnie would take her backpack on vacation, he tries to convince her backpack's airplane pilot keychain, Captain Zip to fly him and Barbie to Hawaii. However, Captain Zip tells Ken that he does not actually fly an airplane.

After Ken goes back in Bonnie's backpack to cry about their misfortune, Barbie reveals to Woody that Ken planned to have their first kiss on a beach at sunset, basing it off of an image on a Hawaii travel brochure. This inspires Bonnie's toys to recreate their own version of Hawaii.

After various adventures, Ken and Barbie share their first kiss outside of Bonnie's house at sunset, recreating the scene from the brochure. However, they step off of the edge of the porch, causing them to be buried in snow. Bonnie's toys dig them out and attempt to free them from a block of ice by using a hair dryer and screw driver.

== Voice cast ==
- Tom Hanks as Woody
- Tim Allen as Buzz Lightyear
- Joan Cusack as Jessie
- Don Rickles as Mr. Potato Head
- Estelle Harris as Mrs. Potato Head
- Wallace Shawn as Rex
- John Ratzenberger as Hamm
- Blake Clark as Slinky Dog
- Jeff Pidgeon as Aliens
- Jodi Benson as Barbie
- Michael Keaton as Ken
- Emily Hahn as Bonnie
- Lori Alan as Bonnie's mom
- Timothy Dalton as Mr. Pricklepants
- Jeff Garlin as Buttercup
- Kristen Schaal as Trixie
- Bonnie Hunt as Dolly
- Bud Luckey as Chuckles
- Zoe Levin as Peas-in-a-Pod
- Angus MacLane as Captain Zip
- Axel Geddes as Rexing Ball
- Javier Fernández-Peña as Spanish Buzz

== Production ==
The film was announced in June 2010 by Lee Unkrich who said, "We have announced we're going to do a short film in front of Cars 2 that uses the Toy Story characters. We're going to keep them alive; they're not going away forever." The short film's title and plot were later revealed on February 17, 2011.

== Reception ==
Charlie McCollum of Mercury News called it a "delightful snippet of life" that is "crisp, funny and sweet."

== Home media ==
On November 1, 2011, Hawaiian Vacation was released as a bonus feature on the Cars 2 DVD and Blu-ray. As of July 2012, Hawaiian Vacation is available as a digital purchase on Amazon Video and iTunes Store. The short was released on November 13, 2012, on the DVD and Blu-ray of Pixar Short Films Collection Volume 2. The short was also released on the Toy Story of Terror! Blu-ray and DVD on August 19, 2014, alongside two other Toy Story Toons.
