= Small Fry (film) =

2011 Pixar short directed by Angus MacLane

- Theatrical release poster
- Directed by: Angus MacLane
- Written by: Angus MacLane
- Story by: John Lasseter; Angus MacLane
- Produced by: Kim Adams
- Starring: Tom Hanks; Tim Allen; Joan Cusack; Don Rickles; Estelle Harris; Wallace Shawn; John Ratzenberger; Teddy Newton; Angus MacLane; Jane Lynch; Timothy Dalton
- Edited by: Torbin Xan Bullock
- Music by: Henry Jackman
- Animation by: Toy Story
- Production company: Pixar Animation Studios
- Distributed by: Walt Disney Studios Motion Pictures
- Release date: November 23, 2011 (with The Muppets)
- Running time: 7 minutes
- Country: United States
- Language: English

Toy Story Toons: Small Fry is a 2011 American animated short film written and directed by Angus MacLane. It was shown in theaters with The Muppets on November 23, 2011.

Small Fry is the second short in the Toy Story Toons series, based on the characters from the Toy Story feature films. The short involves Buzz getting trapped at a fast food restaurant, where there is a support group for discarded kids' meal toys from over the years, with a kids' meal toy version of Buzz taking his place.

== Plot ==
One night at a fast-food chicken restaurant named Poultry Palace, Bonnie does not like the Zurg belt buckle toy she receives as her kids' meal toy. She asks if she could instead acquire a Mini Buzz Lightyear toy, but the cashier tells her the restaurant's supply of them has run out, and that the items in the display cabinet are unavailable, being for display only. A Mini Buzz Lightyear complains to a Mini Zurg that they will never be played with, but Mini Zurg prefers to stay because he doesn't want to get in trouble with anyone at Poultry Palace.

After eating dinner, Bonnie goes to play in the ball pit with Rex and Buzz Lightyear, whom she brought along. Seizing a chance to be played with, Mini Buzz sneaks out of the display cabinet, climbs into the ball pit, and pulls Buzz under the balls to take his place. Bonnie's mother packs the toys in her bag, unaware that Mini Buzz was not the real Buzz.

Mini Buzz successfully fools Rex into thinking he is the real Buzz and that he was shrunk by the plastic in the ball pit, though when they return home, the other toys instantly realize he is an imposter. Meanwhile, Buzz emerges from the balls and discovers he was left behind at the restaurant, which is now closed.

While trying to escape, Buzz discovers a storage room where a support group for abandoned fast food toys is being held, led by a mermaid toy named Neptuna.

The support group thinks Buzz is another victim of abandonment and he is forced to take part in the meeting. During a reenactment therapy session, Buzz meets Gary Grappling Hook, a toy grappling hook and a member of the group, and he uses him to escape. Back at Bonnie's house, the other toys demand Mini Buzz to reveal Buzz's whereabouts, and then begin devising a plan to break into Poultry Palace and save him.

However, Buzz soon finds his way home and returns, confronting Mini Buzz about his behavior. Mini Buzz is then seen at the support group opening up to the others, with Buzz now accompanying him as his sponsor. In a post-credits scene, back at the Poultry Palace restaurant, Mini Zurg is left with the electronic belt buckle as his sole companion, much to his delight.

== Voice cast ==
- Tim Allen as Buzz Lightyear
- Teddy Newton as Mini Buzz Lightyear
- Tom Hanks as Woody
- Joan Cusack as Jessie
- Don Rickles as Mr. Potato Head
- Estelle Harris as Mrs. Potato Head
- Wallace Shawn as Rex
- John Ratzenberger as Hamm
- Jane Lynch as Neptuna
- Angus MacLane as T-Bone, Super Pirate, Funky Monk, Gary Grappling Hook
- Timothy Dalton as Mr. Pricklepants
- Peter Sohn as Recycle Ben
- Emily Hahn as Bonnie
- Lori Alan as Bonnie's Mom, Tae-Kwon Doe
- Josh Cooley as Cashier, Lizard Wizard
- Jess Harnell as Mini Zurg, Vlad the Engineer
- Bret Parker as DJ Blu-Jay
- Emily Forbes as Roxy Boxy
- Kitt Hirasaki as Nervous Sys-Tim
- Carlos Alazraqui as Koala Kopter
- Bob Bergen as Condorman
- Jason Topolski as Ghost Burger, Pizza Bot
- Jim Ward as Franklin

== Production notes ==
The "Condorman" toy is a reference to the Disney live action comedy/adventure film Condorman (1981); in an interview, director Angus MacLane said, "I'm hoping for a very small sub set of the Disney animation fans to be stoked that there is actually a Condorman toy. Maybe it will stir up some buzz about a gritty re boot."

== Release ==
This short premiered with the theatrical release of The Muppets, on November 23, 2011.

=== Home media ===
As of July 2012, Small Fry is available as a digital download on Amazon Video, and iTunes. The short was released on November 13, 2012, on the DVD and Blu-ray of Pixar Short Films Collection, Volume 2. It is also on the Toy Story of Terror! Blu-ray, released on August 19, 2014.
