= Toy Story Toons =

Series of animated short films by Pixar

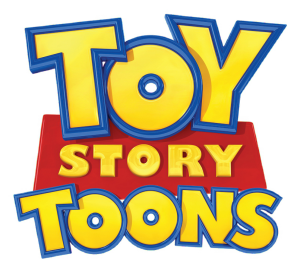
- Directed by: Gary Rydstrom (1); Angus MacLane (2); Mark Walsh (3)
- Starring: Tom Hanks; Tim Allen; John Ratzenberger; Wallace Shawn; Estelle Harris; Don Rickles; Joan Cusack; Timothy Dalton; Emily Hahn; Lori Alan; Michael Keaton; Jodi Benson; Teddy Newton; Jane Lynch; Corey Burton; Tony Cox; Donald Fullilove
- Music by: Mark Mothersbaugh; Henry Jackman; BT
- Production companies: Walt Disney Pictures; Pixar Animation Studios
- Distributed by: Walt Disney Studios Motion Pictures; Disney-ABC Domestic Television (television releases of Partysaurus Rex)
- Release dates: June 24, 2011 (Hawaiian Vacation); November 23, 2011 (Small Fry); September 14, 2012 (Partysaurus Rex)
- Running time: 6–7 minutes
- Country: United States
- Language: English

Toy Story Toons is an American animated short film series based on the Toy Story franchise. It follows Woody, Buzz Lightyear, and their friends in comedic adventures at Bonnie's house after Andy donated them to her at the end of Toy Story 3 and taking place after the events of the third film and Terror. Three shorts were released as part of the series: Hawaiian Vacation and Small Fry in 2011 and Partysaurus Rex in 2012. They premiered before theatrical releases of Walt Disney Pictures films.

In 2013, it was revealed a fourth short was in the works, entitled Mythic Rock. However, it was never released. Toy Story of Terror and Toy Story That Time Forgot were originally planned to be part of the series.

== Cast and characters ==
Characters
Characters	Hawaiian Vacation	Small Fry	Partysaurus Rex
Sheriff Woody	Tom Hanks	Tom Hanks	Tom Hanks
Buzz Lightyear	Tim Allen Javier Fernandez-Peña (Spanish Buzz)	Tim Allen	Tim Allen
Jessie	Joan Cusack	Joan Cusack	Joan Cusack
Aliens	Jeff Pidgeon	Silent cameo	Silent cameo
Hamm	John Ratzenberger	John Ratzenberger	John Ratzenberger
Rex	Wallace Shawn	Wallace Shawn	Wallace Shawn
Slinky Dog	Blake Clark	Silent cameo	Silent cameo
Mr. Potato Head	Don Rickles	Don Rickles	Don Rickles
Mrs. Potato Head	Estelle Harris	Estelle Harris	Estelle Harris
Barbie	Jodi Benson		
Mr. Pricklepants	Timothy Dalton	Timothy Dalton	Timothy Dalton
Buttercup	Jeff Garlin	Silent cameo	Silent cameo
Trixie	Kristen Schaal	Silent cameo	Silent cameo
Dolly	Bonnie Hunt	Silent cameo	Silent cameo
Peas-in-a-Pod	Zoe Levin		Silent cameo
Ken	Michael Keaton		
Bonnie	Emily Hahn	Emily Hahn	Emily Hahn
Bonnie's mom	Lori Alan	Lori Alan	Lori Alan
Chuckles	Bud Luckey		

== Short films ==
No.	Title	Directed by	Original release date	Originally released with
1	"Hawaiian Vacation"	Gary Rydstrom	June 24, 2011	Cars 2
Ken and Barbie want to go on vacation to Hawaii with Bonnie, but get left behind, so Woody, Buzz, Jessie and the rest of Bonnie's toys make a Hawaiian vacation in Bonnie's bedroom.
2	"Small Fry"	Angus MacLane	November 23, 2011	The Muppets
Buzz gets left behind at a fast food restaurant and stumbles upon a support group for discarded kids' meal toys. Meanwhile, a smaller kids' meal Buzz Lightyear toy tries to take his place in Bonnie's room.
3	"Partysaurus Rex"	Mark Walsh	September 14, 2012	Finding Nemo 3D
Rex gets left in the bathroom after Bonnie's bathtime, making friends with Bonnie's bath toys and throwing a rave in the bathroom.
