= Toy Story That Time Forgot =

2014 Christmas television special

- Television release poster
- Written by: Steve Purcell
- Directed by: Steve Purcell
- Voices of: Kristen Schaal; Kevin McKidd; Don Rickles; Wallace Shawn; Timothy Dalton; Tom Hanks; Tim Allen; Emily Hahn; Steve Purcell; R.C. Cope; Emma Hudak
- Music by: Michael Giacchino
- Country of origin: United States
- Original language: English

Production
- Producer: Galyn Susman
- Editor: David Suther
- Running time: 22 minutes
- Production companies: Pixar Animation Studios; Disney Television Animation; Walt Disney Pictures

Original release
- Network: ABC
- Release: December 2, 2014

Toy Story That Time Forgot is an American animated Christmas television special produced by Pixar Animation Studios and Disney Television Animation for Walt Disney Pictures, that aired on ABC on December 2, 2014. Written and directed by Steve Purcell, taking place after the events Toy Story Toons and months before the events of Toy Story 4 (2019). It stars most of the regular cast from the Toy Story series reprising their roles, including Tom Hanks, Tim Allen, Kristen Schaal, Wallace Shawn, Timothy Dalton, Don Rickles, and Joan Cusack, with Kevin McKidd and Emma Hudak joining as new characters. Michael Giacchino composed the music for the special. This was Rickles' final TV special role before his death on April 6, 2017, and was the last Toy Story production for four and a half years until the release of Toy Story 4 on June 21, 2019.

== Plot ==
Trixie, a toy triceratops, is frustrated that Bonnie never depicts her as a dinosaur during playtime. On December 27, Bonnie takes Trixie, Woody, Buzz Lightyear, Rex, and aphorism-spouting Christmas ornament Angel Kitty to her cousin Mason's house for a play date. However, Bonnie ends up tossing the toys into Mason's playroom and joining Mason in playing with his new video game console.

Bonnie's toys discover the playroom is dominated by a huge "Battlesaurs" playset that Mason received for Christmas, complete with several humanoid-dinosaur-hybrid action figures led by the gallant warrior Reptillus Maximus and the pteranodon-like shaman The Cleric. Trixie is delighted to interact with them as a dinosaur; she and Rex are armed as warriors, unaware that Woody and Buzz have been taken prisoners. Reptillus and Trixie quickly grow close, but it is soon revealed that the Battlesaurs have not yet been played with, and therefore do not know that they are toys. To Trixie's horror, Mason's other toys are violently attacked in a combat arena. Woody and Buzz are then brought in to fight, but Trixie defends them. The Cleric denounces Trixie as a heretic for bearing Bonnie's name on her foot; she flees to get Bonnie's help, and Reptillus is sent after her. She shows him his own toy package, which enrages him.

In the arena, the Cleric takes control of Rex's robotic armaments and forces him to seize Woody and Buzz. They realize the Cleric is aware of Mason and their status as toys; with Mason preoccupied by the video game, the Cleric maintains authoritarian control over the Battlesaurs, and apparently, the playroom. The Cleric intends to destroy Woody, Buzz, and Angel Kitty by tossing them in the air vent. In Mason's bedroom, Reptillus confronts Trixie as she is about to deactivate the video game. She tells him about the meaning of playtime, and he reluctantly turns the game off. Mason finds Reptillus, and he and Bonnie begin playing with him. The children return to the playroom just in time to save Woody and Buzz, and they play with the Battlesaurs and other toys in a variety of non-combat settings.

Back at Bonnie's house, Trixie tells the other toys that she is "Bonnie's dinosaur", and is happy in every role Bonnie has for her. Angel Kitty gives one last moral and vanishes, leaving the toys silent with bewilderment.

== Cast ==
- Kristen Schaal as Trixie, a toy Triceratops.
- Kevin McKidd as Reptillus Maximus, a dinosaur action figure.
- Steve Purcell as Cleric, the leader of the Battlesaurs.
- Wallace Shawn as Rex, a toy green Tyrannosaurus rex.
- Tom Hanks as Sheriff Woody, a cowboy doll from his own 1955-1957 marionette TV series Woody's Roundup.
- Tim Allen as Buzz Lightyear, a Space Ranger action figure from Andy Davis' favorite film.
- Emily Hahn as Bonnie Anderson
- R.C. Cope as Mason, Bonnie's cousin.
- Jonathan Kydd as Ray-Gon
- Don Rickles as Mr. Potato Head. This was his final role as Mr. Potato Head and his final film role overall before his death in 2017.
- Timothy Dalton as Mr. Pricklepants
- Joan Cusack as Jessie, a cowgirl doll from the 1955-1957 marionette TV series Woody's Roundup.
- Emma Hudak as Angel Kitty
- Lori Alan as Mrs. Anderson, Bonnie's mother.

== Production ==
The special was planned to be a six-minute short, but John Lasseter liked the idea and suggested making it into a holiday special. The special took three years to make, with two years spent on story development. The team took time to design the Battlesaurs as if they were a real cartoon and toy line.

In the UK, Toy Story That Time Forgot was broadcast by Sky Movies and aired on December 6, 2014, four days after the US' air date. The TV special was also broadcast on Channel 4 and then later sister channel E4 in 2017.

== Marketing ==
The first look poster for Toy Story That Time Forgot, created by comics artist Mike Mignola, was released at Comic Con 2014.

== Home media ==
Toy Story That Time Forgot was released on Blu-ray and DVD on November 3, 2015. Bundled with the physical copies is a fake intro to the Battlesaurs cartoon, animated by the Japanese production company Studio Trigger.

== Reception ==
The special received 6.79 million viewers, and received acclaim from critics. On Disney Channel, it received 3.27 million viewers, making it the most-watched broadcast on the network that night.

The review aggregator website Rotten Tomatoes reported that 92% of critics have given the special a positive review based on 12 reviews, with an average rating of 7.50/10. At Metacritic, the special has a weighted average score of 81 out of 100 based on 8 critics, indicating "universal acclaim".

IGN said, "Toy Story That Time Forgot may not have time for the addicting sentiment that we've grown accustomed to with these characters, but it's still a lot of fun." CinemaBlend rated it 4.5 out of 5, saying "Delivering the humor, heart and toy-filled adventure that we've come to expect from the Toy Story franchise, Toy Story That Time Forgot is another wonderful, entertaining and playful installment to the franchise, and well worth a watch for kids and kids-at-heart."

== See also ==
- List of films featuring dinosaurs
