= Partysaurus Rex =

2012 Pixar short directed by Mark Walsh

- Theatrical release poster
- Directed by: Mark Walsh
- Screenplay by: Mark Walsh
- Story by: Mark Walsh; John Lasseter
- Produced by: Kim Adams
- Starring: Wallace Shawn; Tom Hanks; Tim Allen; Corey Burton; Tony Cox; Don Fullilove; Emily Hahn; Don Rickles; Lori Alan; Estelle Harris; John Ratzenberger; Mark Walsh; Timothy Dalton; Joan Cusack; Sherry Lynn; Lori Richardson
- Edited by: Axel Geddes
- Music by: BT
- Production company: Pixar Animation Studios
- Distributed by: Walt Disney Studios; Motion Pictures (theatrical release); Disney-ABC Domestic Television (television distributor)
- Release dates: September 14, 2012 (with Finding Nemo 3D); October 18, 2012 (Disney Channel)
- Running time: 7 minutes
- Country: United States
- Language: English

Toy Story Toons: Partysaurus Rex is a 2012 American animated short film written and directed by Mark Walsh. It was first screened ahead of the 3D theatrical re-release of Finding Nemo as the third and final short in the trilogy of Toy Story Toons, based on the characters from the Toy Story feature films. It depicts Rex getting left in a bathroom and befriending bath toys.

== Plot ==
Rex disrupts the other toys blowing bubbles, worried that they may get soap on the floor. He is chastised by the other toys, with Mr. Potato Head calling him "Partypooper Rex". The other toys hear Bonnie preparing for a bath and scatter, leaving Rex alone; Bonnie plays with him and her bath toys in the tub until her mother pulls the plug and takes Bonnie to go to her grandma's.

The bath toys are glad of a visitor, but become sad when the last of the water drains, as they lack arms and need water to move. They wish someone could fill the tub again. Rex initially thinks drawing a new bath is a bad idea, but after recalling Mr. Potato Head's insult, he asserts that he is "Partysaurus Rex", plugs the drain, and turns on the water.

The bath toys quickly start a rave, aided by a carefree Rex, who adds bubble bath and plugs the overflow drain with a sponge. Suddenly, he realizes that because of what he'd done, the overflowing tub will pour the water out into the hall. However, his frantic attempts to turn off the water only breaks the water knob and the plug chain.

Finally, he pulls a small knob on the faucet and stops the flow from it, but this simply diverts the water to the showerhead. He warns the others that the tub will overflow, but the bath toys think this is a good thing and gleefully ride a water wave over the top. Outside the bathroom, Woody, Buzz, and some of the other toys arrive to check on Rex. Suddenly, the bathroom door bursts open, releasing the huge wave.

Later, Bonnie's mother pays to have plumbing repairs done to the house. Rex enjoys his moment of fame, though Mr. Potato Head doubts his story. Outside, several pool toys have heard of Rex's exploits from the bath toys; they ask him to turn on the outside faucet, to let them party as well. Rex agrees and joins in their fun.

== Voice cast ==
- Wallace Shawn as Rex
- Corey Burton as Captain Suds
- Tony Cox/Don Fullilove as Chuck E. Duck
- Tom Hanks as Woody
- Tim Allen as Buzz Lightyear
- Emily Hahn as Bonnie
- Don Rickles as Mr. Potato Head
- Lori Alan as Bonnie's mom
- Estelle Harris as Mrs. Potato Head
- John Ratzenberger as Hamm
- Mark Walsh as Drips
- Timothy Dalton as Mr. Pricklepants
- Joan Cusack as Jessie
- Sherry Lynn as Cuddles
- Lori Richardson as Babs
- Teddy Newton as Scooby
- Jessica Evers as Dolphina
- Angus MacLane as Police Officer
- Mona Marshall as Helga Von Bubble

== Music ==
Electronic artist BT composed the music for the short. He said in an interview: "I'm in the middle of scoring a film for Pixar right now. It's a short for Toy Story, and I'm not allowed to say the whole story, but quite literally, it's like a Toy Story rave, and I'm actually not kidding either.

Like, the toys get into all these shenanigans and it's like pounding club music, this thing. So it's really not very Pixar, but in like a really hysterical way, everyone laughs so hard when they see it. It's really exciting to work with those guys." A song inspired by the short, titled "Partysaurus Overflow" and produced by BT and Au5, was released as a digital download on November 19, 2012, on iTunes and Amazon.

The remix, by BT and Au5, was released later, on the remix album, Dconstructed.

== Release ==
Partysaurus Rex premiered with the 3D theatrical re-release of Finding Nemo, on September 14, 2012. It had its television premiere on October 8, 2012, on Disney Channel, and was available for video streaming to the internet, via Disney's website, on October 10, 2012. As of July 2026, the short is also available on Disney+, iTunes, Amazon and YouTube.

The short made its home video debut as a special feature on the 3D Blu-ray, and updated Blu-ray release of Monsters, Inc., which was released on February 19, 2013, except for the regular disc on Blu-ray, for the United Kingdom. It is also on the Blu-ray and DVD of Toy Story of Terror!, released on August 19, 2014. It is also featured on the Pixar Short Films Collection, Volume 3 on Blu-ray and DVD, released on November 13, 2018.

== Reception ==
Ben Kendrick, of The Christian Science Monitor, said that Partysaurus Rex is "easily the most enjoyable franchise spin-off to date."

== See also ==
- List of films featuring dinosaurs
