= Condorman =

1981 film by Charles Jarrott

- Theatrical release poster
- Directed by: Charles Jarrott
- Screenplay by: Marc Stirdivant
- Based on: The Game of X by Robert Sheckley
- Produced by: Jan Williams
- Starring: Michael Crawford; Oliver Reed; Barbara Carrera; James Hampton; Jean-Pierre Kalfon; Dana Elcar
- Cinematography: Charles F. Wheeler
- Edited by: Gordon D. Brenner
- Music by: Henry Mancini
- Production company: Walt Disney Productions
- Distributed by: Buena Vista Distribution
- Release dates: July 2, 1981 (London); August 7, 1981 (United States)
- Running time: 90 minutes
- Country: United States
- Language: English

Condorman is a 1981 American superhero comedy film directed by Charles Jarrott, produced by Walt Disney Productions, and starring Michael Crawford, Barbara Carrera, and Oliver Reed. The film follows comic book illustrator Woodrow Wilkins's attempts to assist in the defection of a female Soviet KGB agent.

== Plot ==
Woodrow "Woody" Wilkins is an imaginative, yet eccentric, comic book writer and illustrator who demands a sense of realism for his comic book hero "Condorman", to the point where he crafts a Condorman flying suit of his own and launches himself off the Eiffel Tower. The test flight fails as his right wing breaks, sending him crashing into the Seine River.

After the incident, Woody is asked by his friend, CIA file clerk Harry, to perform what appears to be a civilian paper swap in Istanbul. Upon arriving in Istanbul, he meets a beautiful Soviet woman named Natalia Rambova, who poses as the Soviet civilian with whom the exchange is supposed to take place, but it is later revealed that she is in fact a KGB spy. Woody does not tell Natalia his real name, and instead fabricates his identity to her as a top American agent code-named "Condorman". During the encounter, Woody fends off a group of would-be assassins and saves her life by sheer luck before accomplishing the paper trade. Impressed by Woody, and disgusted by how she was treated by her lover/boss Krokov when she returns to Moscow, Natalia decides to defect and asks the CIA to have "Condorman" be the agent that helps her.

Back in Paris, Woody's encounter with Natalia inspires him to create a superheroine patterned after her named "Laser Lady". He is then notified by Harry and his boss Russ that he is to escort a defecting Soviet agent known as "The Bear". Woody refuses to do the job, but when Russ reveals that "The Bear" is Natalia, he agrees to do it on the condition that the CIA provides him with gadgetry based on his designs. However, Woody publishes details of the extraction operation as part of his latest Condorman story, allowing Krokov to track his movements once he discovers Woody's identity.

Woody meets up with Natalia in Yugoslavia and protects her from Krokov's henchmen led by the homicidal, glass-eyed assassin Morovich. After joining Harry in Italy, the trio ventures to Switzerland, where Natalia discovers the truth about Woody when a group of children recognize her from his comic books. Their journey back to France is compromised when Morovich puts Woody and Harry out of commission and Krokov's men recover Natalia before retreating to their headquarters in Monte Carlo. Woody is told that the mission is a failure and he and Harry are ordered to return to Paris, but Woody asks Harry for two more days to conduct an operation to rescue Natalia.

Disguising themselves as Arab sheikhs, Woody and Harry win big at the Monte Carlo Casino, impressing Krokov and receiving an invite to a party at his villa. At the villa, Woody and Harry create an explosive diversion to recover Natalia from Krokov and his men. As Harry drives away in a Rolls-Royce, Woody uses an improved version of his Condorman suit to fly himself and Natalia away from the villa and onto the pier, where the trio make their getaway aboard the Condorboat. They manage to destroy Krokov's speedboats following them, but Krokov and Morovich pursue them in their own speedboat. The Condorboat reaches its pickup point, but Morovich shows his intent on ramming it. When Morovich ignores his commander's orders to return to base, Krokov abandons the ship. The Condorboat is lifted by the CIA helicopter in time to prevent a collision, causing Morovich to crash on an island rock.

Days later, Woody, Natalia and Harry are at Dodger Stadium in Los Angeles, where they see the Goodyear Blimp flash a sign welcoming Natalia to the U.S. Aboard the blimp, Russ contacts Harry and has him ask Woody if he is interested in taking Condorman to another assignment.

== Cast ==
- Michael Crawford as Woodrow "Woody" Wilkins / Condorman
- Barbara Carrera as Natalia Rambova
- Oliver Reed as Krokov
- James Hampton as Harry
- Jean-Pierre Kalfon as Morovich
- Dana Elcar as Russ / El Oso
- Vernon Dobtcheff as Russian agent
- Robert Arden as CIA Chief

== Production ==
=== Development ===
Condorman was inspired by The Game of X by Robert Sheckley, a novel published in 1965. The Chicago Tribune called it "genuinely funny and suspenseful." The New York Times said it was "often very funny". The Los Angeles Times called it "riotous".

The film was slightly more racy than Disney normally produced. Then-president Ron Miller said the Barbara Carrera character was "the sexiest in Disney's history".

The Condormobile was a modified Nova Sterling kit car.

=== Filming ===
Condorman was filmed in Paris, Monte Carlo and Zermatt, Switzerland. Rémy Julienne, a renowned French stunt driver whose previous work included The Italian Job and several James Bond films among more than a hundred others, coordinated the film's car chases and stunts. Julienne, who mostly worked in French productions, kept a high standard for the film's set pieces involving cars, stating that "You recognize a good [car chase] because it is fresh and surprising. A bad one reminds you of a hundred you have seen before."

The film's special effects were directed by Colin Chilvers, who previously worked on the first two Superman films starring Christopher Reeve. The effects were filmed at the location also used by Chilvers for the Superman films: Pinewood Studios. Using the same facilities meant efficiency for Chilvers to create the effects he desired, reusing the equipment from Superman and adapting it for Condorman. A problem Chilvers encountered was being unable to fit the mold used by Reeve for Michael Crawford, requiring him to make a new set of molds for Crawford. He also enforced a strict gag rule among his 12-man crew to never disclose the methods used to create the effects after the film's release, asking "[w]hy do audiences need to know how each effect is done? It lessens their enjoyment of the movie."

== Release ==
The film opened at the Odeon Marble Arch in London on July 2, 1981. With a production cost of approximately $14 million, the film performed poorly at the box office, and Disney reportedly lost $9.5 million on the picture. The disappointing financial returns from Condorman, along with three other flop films, contributed to Disney's poor financial performance in 1981.

== Reception ==
The film was heavily panned by critics when it premiered in 1981. It has an approval rating of 27% on Rotten Tomatoes, based on 15 reviews, with an average of 4.4/10. The Los Angeles Times called it "dull" and "dispiriting." On their television show At the Movies, critics Gene Siskel and Roger Ebert both gave the film a negative rating, stating that it had some nice elements but mainly pointing out the low production standards such as visible harness cable used for Condorman's flying sequences and obvious special effects; both critics said that it felt like Disney was once again a few years behind the times of what anyone wanted or expected to see from their genre efforts. On the other hand, John Corry of The New York Times wrote a favorable review of the film, calling it "painless and chaste, and it has a lot of beautiful scenery and beautiful clothes. There are worse things to watch while you eat popcorn."

However, despite the film's failures, it has gained a cult following among Disney fans.

== Media ==
=== Home media ===
Condorman was first released on home video in January 1982, on VHS and Betamax. It was re-released on VHS and made its Region 1 DVD debut on May 18, 1999, when it was released by Anchor Bay Entertainment. A Region 2 version was released on August 21, 2006. The film was re-released in Region 1 exclusively for members of the Disney Movie Club on May 1, 2009.

=== Soundtrack ===
The film's complete musical score composed by Henry Mancini was released on CD by Intrada Records on November 13, 2012. The album contained twenty tracks from the film and eight bonus tracks totaling just over 60 minutes, and was designated as Intrada Special Collection Volume 219. It was part of a special collaboration with The Walt Disney Company resulting in the release of several rare Disney scores on CD.

=== Novelization ===
Joe Claro wrote the novelization of the film, which was published by Scholastic Corporation for 350,000 copies in 1981 .

=== Comic book adaptation/sequel ===
A comic book adaptation of Condorman was published by Whitman Comics at the time of the film's release. A notable change in the illustrations was that Russ, the CIA boss, became an African-American. An original comic adventure sequel was also published in the third and last issue, taking place in the US. Woody is engaged to Natalia, and his Condorman machines are being built by a toy company — a cover for a CIA unit. Krokov and Morovich again appear, attempting to take Natalia back to the USSR by force.

The film was also adapted into a weekly comic strip for Disney's Treasury of Classic Tales by Russ Heath.

Following Disney's acquisition of Marvel Comics in 2009, The Amazing Spider-Man editor Stephen Wacker lobbied to have Condorman brought into the Marvel Universe.

=== Video games ===
Condorman's wings can be summoned in Disney Infinity, Disney Infinity 2.0 and Disney Infinity 3.0 via a power disc. The wings give the player the ability to glide through the air.

=== Pop culture references ===
In the Pixar short film Toy Story Toons: Small Fry, a Condorman toy (voiced by Bob Bergen) appears at a support group meeting for discarded kids' meal toys.
