= Teddy Newton =

American animator and voice actor

- Education: California Institute of the Arts
- Occupations: Animator; film director; storyboard artist; voice actor
- Years active: 1994–present
- Employer: Pixar Animation Studios (2004–2018)
- Notable work: Day & Night
- Spouse: Stacey Newton
- Children: 1

Teddy Newton is an American animator and voice actor, best known for his work at Pixar Animation Studios.

== Career ==
Newton worked as a storyboard artist on 2 Stupid Dogs, The Iron Giant, and Dexter's Laboratory. He was a character designer on The Iron Giant, The Incredibles, and Ratatouille, all three of which were directed by Brad Bird. He also co-wrote the short film Jack-Jack Attack and voiced characters in The Incredibles, Ratatouille, WALL-E, and Up. He voiced the Chatter Telephone in Toy Story 3 and Mini Buzz in Toy Story Toons: Small Fry. His first directorial effort for Pixar, Day & Night was nominated for Best Animated Short Film Oscar at the 83rd Academy Awards.

By November 2012, Newton was slated to direct an original Pixar feature film, with Derek Connolly writing the screenplay.

In November 2018, it was announced that Newton would direct Sneaks. However, in June 2021, he was replaced by Rob Edwards.

In September 2019, it was announced that Newton would create the story for a Funko film for the Warner Animation Group, currently known as Warner Bros. Pictures Animation.

== Personal life ==
Newton is married to Stacey, a story manager at Pixar Animation Studios. They have a son.

== Work ==
=== Character designer ===
- The Iron Giant (1999)
- The Incredibles (2004)
- Ratatouille (2007)
- Presto (2008)
- Ray Gunn (2026)

=== Voice actor ===
- The Incredibles (2004)
- Ratatouille (2007)
- WALL-E (2008)
- Up (2009)
- Toy Story 3 (2010)
- Toy Story Toons: Small Fry (2011)
- Mission: Impossible – Ghost Protocol (2011) (uncredited)
- Mission: Impossible – Rogue Nation (2015) (uncredited)

=== Visual development artist ===
- The Iron Giant (1999)
- Osmosis Jones (2001)
- Up (2009)

=== Director ===
- Boy's Night Out (2003)
- Day & Night (2010)

=== Writer ===
- Boy's Night Out (2003, story)
- Jack-Jack Attack (2005, story)
- Day & Night (2010)

=== Storyboard artist ===
- 2 Stupid Dogs (1994)
- Dexter's Laboratory (1996)
- The Iron Giant (1999)
