= List of accolades received by Toy Story 3 =

Toy Story 3 accolades
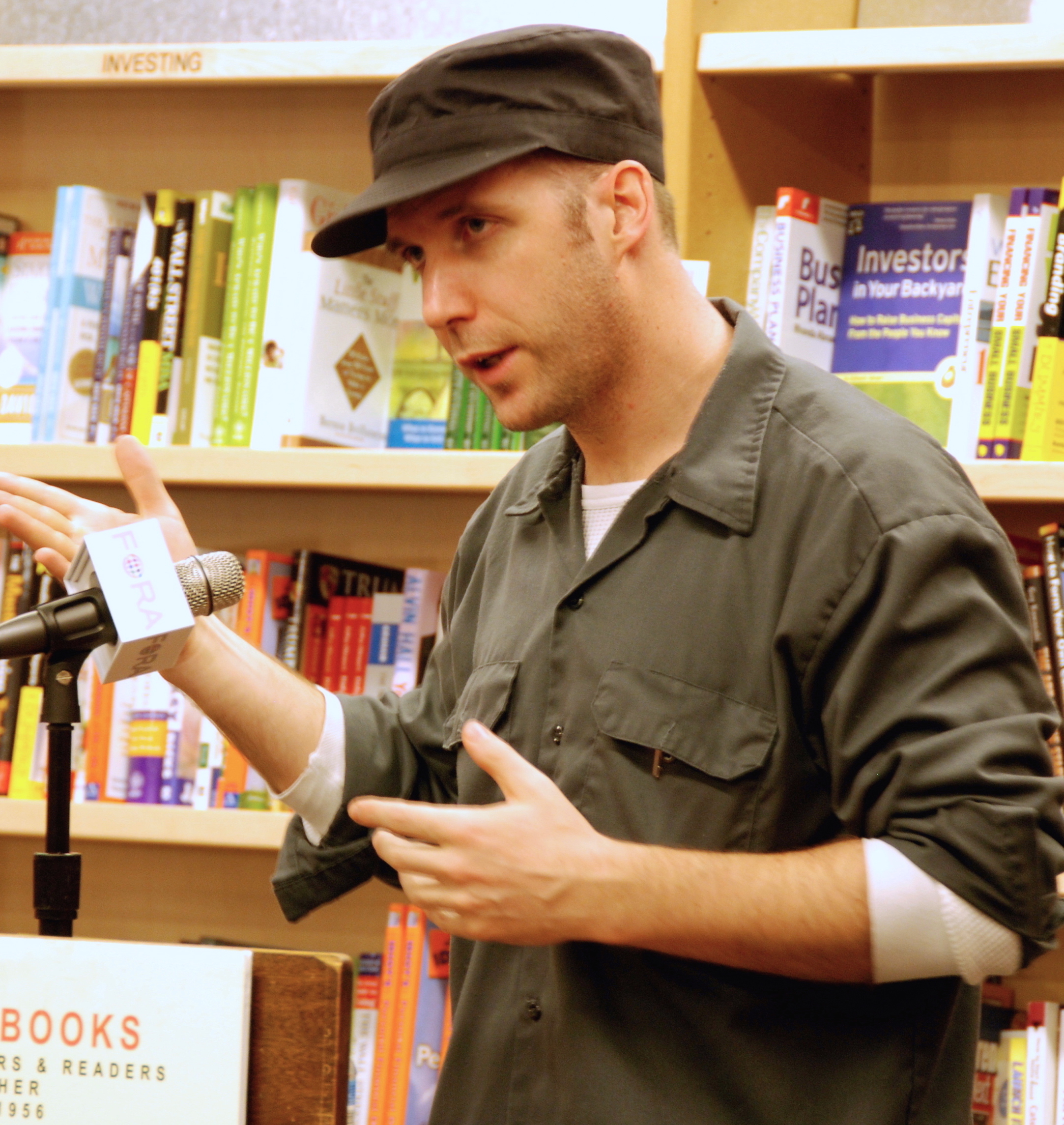
- Screenwriter Michael Arndt received multiple nominations for his work in the film.
Awards and nominations
Award	Wins	Nominations
3D Creative Arts Awards	1	1
Academy Awards	2	5
Alliance of Women Film Journalists Awards	1	3
American Cinema Editors Awards	1	1
American Film Institute Awards	1	1
Annie Awards	0	3
Artios Awards	1	1
ASCAP Awards	1	1
Austin Film Critics Association Awards	1	1
British Academy Children's Awards	0	2
British Academy Film Awards	1	3
Boston Society of Film Critics Awards	2	2
Chicago Film Critics Association Awards	2	2
The Comedy Awards	1	1
Critics' Choice Movie Awards	1	5
Dallas–Fort Worth Film Critics Association Awards	1	1
Dorian Awards	0	1
Dublin Film Critics' Circle Awards	1	1
Empire Awards	0	1
Florida Film Critics Circle Awards	1	1
Golden Globe Awards	1	1
Golden Reel Awards	0	1
Golden Trailer Awards	0	2
Grammy Awards	1	1
Hollywood Film Awards	1	2
Hollywood Post Alliance Awards	0	2
Houston Film Critics Society Awards	1	3
Hugo Awards	0	1
ICG Publicists Awards	0	1
International Cinephile Society Awards	0	1
International Film Music Critics Association Awards	0	1
Irish Film & Television Awards	0	1
Japan Academy Film Prize	0	1
Kansas City Film Critics Circle Awards	1	1
London Film Critics' Circle Awards	0	1
Los Angeles Film Critics Association Awards	1	1
Movieguide Awards	1	1
MTV Movie Awards	0	1
National Board of Review Awards	2	2
National Movie Awards	0	1
Nebula Awards	0	1
New York Film Critics Online Awards	1	1
Nickelodeon Kids' Choice Awards (Australia)	0	1
Nickelodeon Kids' Choice Awards (United States)	0	3
Online Film Critics Society Awards	1	2
People's Choice Awards	1	2
Producers Guild of America Awards	1	2
San Diego Film Critics Society Awards	1	2
San Francisco Film Critics Circle Awards	1	1
Satellite Awards	1	2
Saturn Awards	1	2
Scream Awards	0	4
St. Louis Film Critics Association Awards	1	1
Teen Choice Awards	1	1
Toronto Film Critics Association Awards	1	1
Visual Effects Society Awards	0	2
Washington D.C. Area Film Critics Association Awards	1	3
Women Film Critics Circle Awards	0	1
World Soundtrack Awards	1	1

Totals (Note: Certain award groups do not simply award one winner. They acknowledge several different recipients, have runners-up, and have third place. Since this is a specific recognition and is different from losing an award, runner-up mentions are considered wins in this award tally. For simplification and to avoid errors, each award in this list has been presumed to have had a prior nomination.)
- Wins: 42
- Nominations: 97

Toy Story 3 is a 2010 American animated comedy-drama film produced by Pixar Animation Studios and released by Walt Disney Pictures. It is the third installment in the Toy Story franchise and the sequel to Toy Story 2 (1999). The film was directed by Lee Unkrich from a screenplay he co-wrote with John Lasseter and Andrew Stanton. Toy Story 3 stars the voices of Tom Hanks, Tim Allen, Joan Cusack, Don Rickles, Wallace Shawn, John Ratzenberger, Estelle Harris, Ned Beatty, Michael Keaton, Jodi Benson, Blake Clark who replaced Jim Varney as Slinky Dog after Varney's death in February 2000 and John Morris. In the film, Andy's (Morris) toys are accidentally donated to a daycare center as he prepares to leave for college.

Toy Story 3 debuted at the Taormina Film Fest in Italy on June 12, 2010, and was released in the United States on June 18. Produced on a budget of $200 million, Toy Story 3 grossed $1.067 billion worldwide, finishing its theatrical run as the highest-grossing film of 2010; it ranked as the highest-grossing animated film of all time from August 2010 until March 2014. On the review aggregator website Rotten Tomatoes, the film holds an approval rating of 98% based on 312 reviews. It is considered to be one of the greatest animated films ever, one of the best movies of the 2010s, and one of the best films of all time. Toy Story 3 garnered awards and nominations in various categories with particular recognition for Michael Arndt's writing. It received five nominations at the 83rd Academy Awards, including Best Picture. The film won Best Animated Feature and Best Original Song ("We Belong Together"). Toy Story 3 was nominated for three awards at the 38th Annie Awards. At the 64th British Academy Film Awards, it was nominated for Best Adapted Screenplay and Best Special Visual Effects, and won Best Animated Film.

Toy Story 3 received five nominations at the 16th Critics' Choice Awards and won Best Animated Feature. It won Best Animated Feature Film at the 68th Golden Globe Awards. In 2011, composer Randy Newman won Best Score Soundtrack for Visual Media at the Grammy Awards' 53rd ceremony. Various critic circles also picked it as the best animated feature film of the year. In addition, both the American Film Institute and the National Board of Review selected Toy Story 3 as one of the top-ten films of 2010.

== Accolades ==
Accolades received by Toy Story 3
Award	Date of ceremony	Category	Recipient(s)	Result	Ref.
3D Creative Arts Awards	February 9, 2011	Favorite 3D Animated Movie	Toy Story 3	Won	
Academy Awards	February 27, 2011	Best Picture	Darla K. Anderson	Nominated	
Academy Awards	February 27, 2011	Best Adapted Screenplay	Michael Arndt, John Lasseter, Andrew Stanton, and Lee Unkrich	Nominated	
Academy Awards	February 27, 2011	Best Animated Feature	Lee Unkrich	Won	
Academy Awards	February 27, 2011	Best Sound Editing	Tom Myers and Michael Silvers	Nominated	
Academy Awards	February 27, 2011	Best Original Song	Randy Newman for "We Belong Together"	Won	
Alliance of Women Film Journalists Awards	December 24, 2010	Best Animated Feature	Toy Story 3	Won	
Alliance of Women Film Journalists Awards	December 24, 2010	Best Animated Female	Jodi Benson	Nominated	
Alliance of Women Film Journalists Awards	December 24, 2010	Best Animated Female	Joan Cusack	Nominated	
American Cinema Editors Awards	February 19, 2011	Best Edited Animated Feature Film	Ken Schretzmann and Lee Unkrich	Won	
American Film Institute Awards	December 12, 2010	Top 10 Films of the Year	Toy Story 3	Won (Note: This award does not have a single winner, but recognizes multiple films.)	
Annie Awards	February 5, 2011	Best Animated Feature	Toy Story 3	Nominated	
Annie Awards	February 5, 2011	Outstanding Achievement for Directing in a Feature Production	Lee Unkrich	Nominated	
Annie Awards	February 5, 2011	Outstanding Achievement for Writing in a Feature Production	Michael Arndt	Nominated	
Artios Awards	September 26, 2011	Animation	Kevin Reher and Natalie Lyon	Won	
ASCAP Awards	June 23, 2011	Top Box Office Films	Randy Newman	Won	
Austin Film Critics Association Awards	December 22, 2010	Top 10 Films	Toy Story 3	Won	
Austin Film Critics Association Awards	December 22, 2010	Best Animated Film	Toy Story 3	Won	
British Academy Children's Awards	November 28, 2010	Feature Film	Darla K. Anderson, Lee Unkrich, and Michael Arndt	Nominated	
British Academy Children's Awards	November 28, 2010	Kid's Vote — Film	Toy Story 3	Nominated	
British Academy Film Awards	February 13, 2011	Best Adapted Screenplay	Michael Arndt	Nominated	
British Academy Film Awards	February 13, 2011	Best Animated Film	Lee Unkrich	Won	
British Academy Film Awards	February 13, 2011	Best Special Visual Effects	Guido Quaroni	Nominated	
Boston Society of Film Critics Awards	December 12, 2010	Best Film	Toy Story 3	Runner-up	
Boston Society of Film Critics Awards	December 12, 2010	Best Animated Film	Toy Story 3	Won	
Chicago Film Critics Association Awards	December 20, 2010	Best Animated Film	Toy Story 3	Won	
Chicago Film Critics Association Awards	December 20, 2010	Best Adapted Screenplay	Michael Arndt	Nominated	
The Comedy Awards	March 26, 2011	Best Animated Comedy Movie	Toy Story 3	Won	
Critics' Choice Movie Awards	January 14, 2011	Best Picture	Toy Story 3	Nominated	
Critics' Choice Movie Awards	January 14, 2011	Best Adapted Screenplay	Michael Arndt	Nominated	
Critics' Choice Movie Awards	January 14, 2011	Best Animated Feature	Toy Story 3	Won	
Critics' Choice Movie Awards	January 14, 2011	Best Sound	Randy Newman	Nominated	
Critics' Choice Movie Awards	January 14, 2011	Best Song	Randy Newman for "We Belong Together"	Nominated	
Dallas–Fort Worth Film Critics Association Awards	December 17, 2010	Best Animated Film	Toy Story 3	Won	
Dorian Awards	January 18, 2011	Film of the Year	Toy Story 3	Nominated	
Dublin Film Critics' Circle Awards	December 31, 2010	Top Ten Films	Toy Story 3	3rd place	
Empire Awards	March 27, 2011	Best Comedy	Toy Story 3	Nominated	
Florida Film Critics Circle Awards	December 20, 2010	Best Animated Film	Toy Story 3	Won	
Golden Globe Awards	January 16, 2011	Best Animated Feature Film	Toy Story 3	Won	
Golden Reel Awards	February 20, 2011	Outstanding Achievement in Sound Editing – Sound Effects, Foley, Dialogue and ADR for Animated Feature Film	Toy Story 3	Nominated	
Golden Trailer Awards	June 10, 2010	Summer 2010 Blockbuster	"New Story" (CMP)	Nominated	
Golden Trailer Awards	June 29, 2011	Best Animation/Family TV Spot	"Biggest Ever/Clothes" (MOCEAN)	Nominated	
Grammy Awards	February 13, 2011	Best Score Soundtrack for Visual Media	Randy Newman	Won	
Hollywood Film Awards	October 26, 2010	Hollywood Movie Award	Toy Story 3	Nominated	
Hollywood Film Awards	October 26, 2010	Hollywood Animation Award	Lee Unkrich	Won	
Hollywood Post Alliance Awards	November 11, 2010	Outstanding Editing – Feature Film	Ken Schretzmann and Lee Unkrich	Nominated	
Hollywood Post Alliance Awards	November 11, 2010	Outstanding Sound – Feature Film	Tom Myers, Michael Silvers, and Michael Semanick	Nominated	
Houston Film Critics Society Awards	December 18, 2010	Best Picture	Toy Story 3	Nominated	
Houston Film Critics Society Awards	December 18, 2010	Best Animated Film	Toy Story 3	Won	
Houston Film Critics Society Awards	December 18, 2010	Best Screenplay	John Lasseter, Andrew Stanton, Lee Unkrich, and Michael Arndt	Nominated	
Hugo Awards	August 20, 2011	Best Dramatic Presentation, Long Form	Michael Arndt, John Lasseter, Andrew Stanton, and Lee Unkrich	Nominated	
ICG Publicists Awards	February 25, 2011	Maxwell Weinberg Publicists Showmanship Motion Picture Award	Toy Story 3	Nominated	
International Cinephile Society Awards	February 18, 2011	Best Animated Film	Toy Story 3	Nominated	
International Film Music Critics Association Awards	February 24, 2011	Best Original Score for an Animated Film	Randy Newman	Nominated	
Irish Film & Television Awards	February 12, 2011	Best International Film	Toy Story 3	Nominated	
Japan Academy Film Prize	February 18, 2011	Outstanding Foreign Language Film	Toy Story 3	Nominated	
Kansas City Film Critics Circle Awards	January 2, 2011	Best Animated Feature	Toy Story 3	Won	
London Film Critics' Circle Awards	February 11, 2011	Film of the Year	Toy Story 3	Nominated	
Los Angeles Film Critics Association Awards	December 12, 2010	Best Animated Film	Toy Story 3	Won	
Movieguide Awards	February 18, 2011	Best Movies for Families	Toy Story 3	Won	
MTV Movie Awards	June 5, 2011	Best Villain	Ned Beatty	Nominated	
National Board of Review Awards	December 2, 2010	Best Animated Film	Toy Story 3	Won	
National Board of Review Awards	December 2, 2010	Top Ten Films	Toy Story 3	Won	
National Movie Awards	May 26, 2010	Most Anticipated Movie Of The Summer	Toy Story 3	Nominated	
Nebula Awards	May 21, 2011	Ray Bradbury Nebula Award for Outstanding Dramatic Presentation	Lee Unkrich, Michael Arndt, John Lasseter, and Andrew Stanton	Nominated	
New York Film Critics Online Awards	December 12, 2010	Best Animated Feature	Toy Story 3	Won	
Nickelodeon Kids' Choice Awards (Australia)	October 8, 2010	Fave Movie	Toy Story 3	Nominated	
Nickelodeon Kids' Choice Awards (United States)	April 2, 2011	Favorite Animated Movie	Toy Story 3	Nominated	
Nickelodeon Kids' Choice Awards (United States)	April 2, 2011	Favorite Voice from an Animated Movie	Tom Hanks	Nominated	
Nickelodeon Kids' Choice Awards (United States)	April 2, 2011	Favorite Voice from an Animated Movie	Tim Allen	Nominated	
Online Film Critics Society Awards	January 3, 2011	Best Picture	Toy Story 3	Nominated	
Online Film Critics Society Awards	January 3, 2011	Best Animated Film	Toy Story 3	Won	
People's Choice Awards	January 5, 2011	Favorite Movie	Toy Story 3	Nominated	
People's Choice Awards	January 5, 2011	Favorite Family Movie	Toy Story 3	Won	
Producers Guild of America Awards	January 22, 2011	Best Theatrical Motion Picture	Darla K. Anderson	Nominated	
Producers Guild of America Awards	January 22, 2011	Best Animated Motion Picture	Darla K. Anderson	Won	
San Diego Film Critics Society Awards	December 14, 2010	Best Animated Feature	Toy Story 3	Won	
San Diego Film Critics Society Awards	December 14, 2010	Best Original Screenplay	Michael Arndt	Nominated	
San Francisco Film Critics Circle Awards	December 13, 2010	Best Animated Feature	Toy Story 3	Won	
Satellite Awards	December 19, 2010	Best Animated or Mixed Media Feature	Toy Story 3	Won	
Satellite Awards	December 19, 2010	Best Original Screenplay	Toy Story 3	Nominated	
Saturn Awards	June 23, 2011	Best Animated Film	Toy Story 3	Won	
Saturn Awards	June 23, 2011	Best Writing	Michael Arndt	Nominated	
Scream Awards	October 16, 2010	Best Fantasy Movie	Toy Story 3	Nominated	
Scream Awards	October 16, 2010	Best Scream-Play	Michael Arndt	Nominated	
Scream Awards	October 16, 2010	Best Fantasy Actor	Tom Hanks	Nominated	
Scream Awards	October 16, 2010	3-D Top Three	Toy Story 3	Nominated	
St. Louis Film Critics Association Awards	December 20, 2010	Best Animated Feature	Toy Story 3	Won	
Teen Choice Awards	August 8, 2010	Choice Animated Movie	Toy Story 3	Won	
Toronto Film Critics Association Awards	December 14, 2010	Best Animated Film	Toy Story 3	Runner-up (Note: Shared with Despicable Me (2010))	
Visual Effects Society Awards	February 1, 2011	Outstanding Visual Effects in an Animated Feature	Lee Unkrich, Darla K. Anderson, Guido Quaroni, and Michael Fong	Nominated	
Visual Effects Society Awards	February 1, 2011	Outstanding Effects Animation in an Animated Feature Motion Picture	Jason Johnston, Eric Froemling, David Ryu, and JD Northrup	Nominated	
Washington D.C. Area Film Critics Association Awards	December 6, 2010	Best Adapted Screenplay	Michael Arndt	Nominated	
Washington D.C. Area Film Critics Association Awards	December 6, 2010	Best Film	Toy Story 3	Nominated	
Washington D.C. Area Film Critics Association Awards	December 6, 2010	Best Animated Feature	Toy Story 3	Won	
Women Film Critics Circle Awards	December 23, 2010	Best Family Film	Toy Story 3	Won	
World Soundtrack Awards	October 22, 2011	Best Original Song Written Directly for a Film	Randy Newman for "We Belong Together"	Won	

== See also ==
- List of accolades received by Toy Story 4
