= List of accolades received by Toy Story 4 =

Toy Story 4 accolades
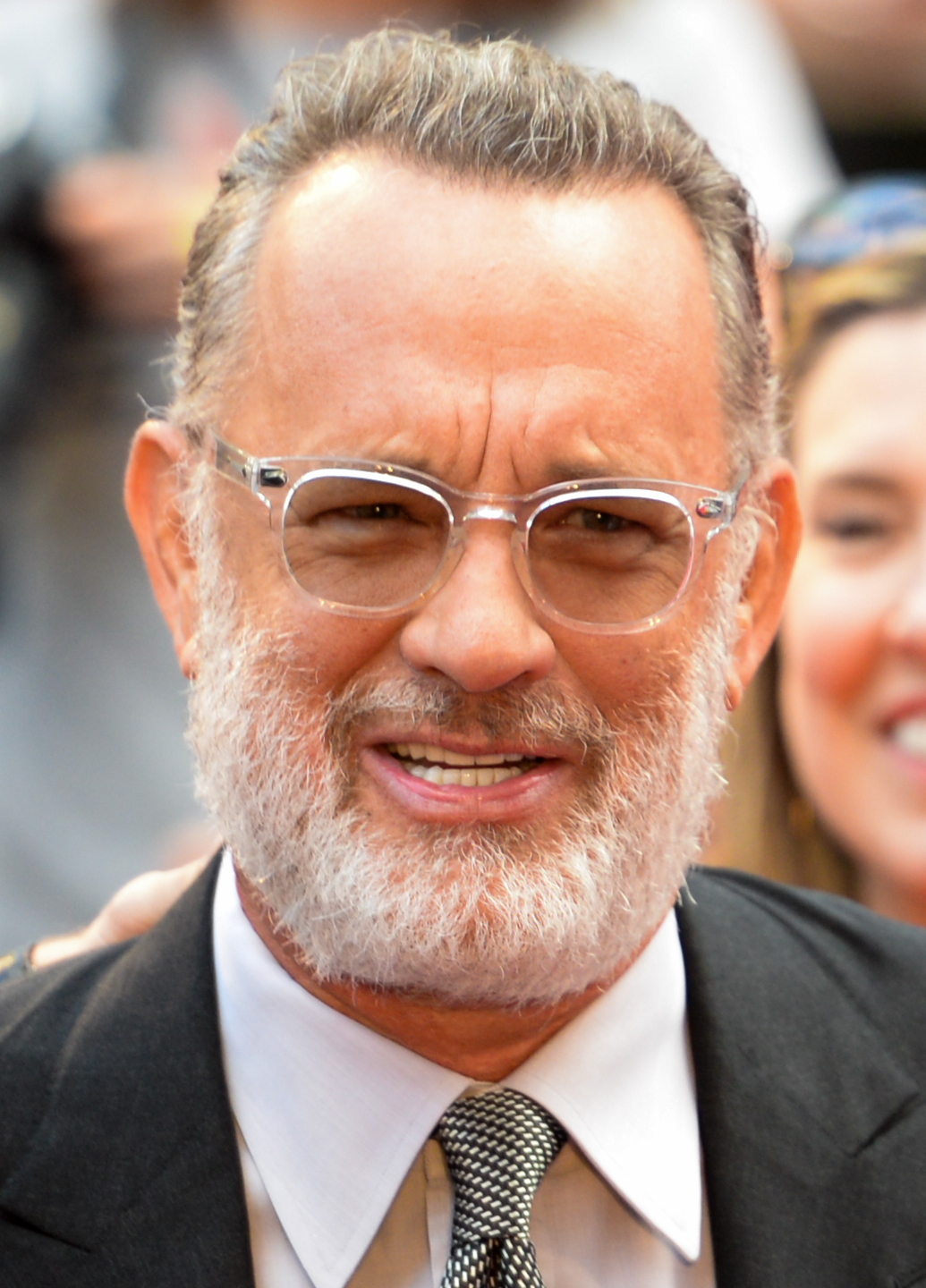
- Tom Hanks received five nominations for his voice role of Woody in the film.
Awards and nominations
Award	Wins	Nominations
Academy Awards	1	2
Alliance of Women Film Journalists Awards	1	2
American Cinema Editors Awards	1	1
Annie Awards	0	6
Art Directors Guild Awards	1	1
Artios Awards	1	1
Austin Film Critics Association Awards	1	1
Black Reel Awards	0	2
British Academy Children's Awards	0	1
British Academy Film Awards	0	1
Boston Society of Film Critics Awards	1	1
Capri Hollywood International Film Festival	1	1
Chicago Film Critics Association Awards	1	1
Cinema Audio Society Awards	1	1
Critics' Choice Movie Awards	1	1
Dallas–Fort Worth Film Critics Association Awards	1	1
Detroit Film Critics Society Awards	1	1
Florida Film Critics Circle Awards	0	1
Georgia Film Critics Association Awards	1	1
Golden Globe Awards	0	1
Golden Raspberry Awards	0	1
Golden Reel Awards	1	1
Golden Trailer Awards	1	3
Grammy Awards	0	1
Hollywood Critics Association Awards	1	2
Hollywood Film Awards	1	1
Houston Film Critics Society Awards	1	1
Humanitas Prize	0	1
International Cinephile Society Awards	0	1
Kansas City Film Critics Circle Awards	1	1
Los Angeles Film Critics Association Awards	1	1
Movieguide Awards	0	1
National Film & TV Awards	1	2
Nickelodeon Kids' Choice Awards	0	2
Online Film Critics Society Awards	1	1
People's Choice Awards	0	3
Producers Guild of America Awards	1	1
San Diego Film Critics Society Awards	1	1
San Francisco Bay Area Film Critics Circle Awards	0	1
Satellite Awards	0	2
Saturn Awards	1	2
Seattle Film Critics Society Awards	1	1
St. Louis Film Critics Association Awards	1	1
Teen Choice Awards	0	1
Toronto Film Critics Association Awards	0	1
Visual Effects Society Awards	1	5
Washington D.C. Area Film Critics Association Awards	1	4

Totals (Note: Certain award groups do not simply award one winner. They acknowledge several different recipients, have runners-up, and have third place. Since this is a specific recognition and is different from losing an award, runner-up mentions are considered wins in this award tally. For simplification and to avoid errors, each award in this list has been presumed to have had a prior nomination.)
- Wins: 29
- Nominations: 69

Toy Story 4 is a 2019 American animated comedy-drama film produced by Pixar Animation Studios and released by Walt Disney Pictures. It is the fourth installment in the Toy Story franchise and the sequel to Toy Story 3 (2010). The film was directed by Josh Cooley (in his feature directorial debut) from the screenplay by Andrew Stanton and Stephany Folsom; they also conceived the story with John Lasseter, Rashida Jones, Will McCormack, Valerie LaPointe, and Martin Hynes. Toy Story 4 stars the voices of Tom Hanks, Tim Allen, Annie Potts, Tony Hale, Keegan-Michael Key, Jordan Peele, Madeleine McGraw, Christina Hendricks, Keanu Reeves, Ally Maki, Jay Hernandez, Lori Alan, and Joan Cusack. Set after the third film, Toy Story 4 follows Woody (Hanks) and Buzz Lightyear (Allen) as the pair and the other toys go on a road trip with Bonnie (McGraw), who creates Forky (Hale), a spork made with recycled materials from her school. Meanwhile, Woody is reunited with Bo Peep (Potts), and must decide where his loyalties lie.

Toy Story 4 premiered in Hollywood, Los Angeles, on June 11, 2019, and was released in the United States on June 21. Produced on a budget of $200 million, Toy Story 4 grossed $1.073 billion worldwide, finishing its theatrical run as the eighth-highest-grossing film of 2019. On the review aggregator website Rotten Tomatoes, the film holds an approval rating of 96% based on 457 reviews.

Toy Story 4 garnered awards and nominations in various categories with particular recognition for Hanks's performance. It received two nominations at the 92nd Academy Awards, including Best Original Song ("I Can't Let You Throw Yourself Away"). The film won Best Animated Feature. Toy Story 4 was nominated for six awards at the 47th Annie Awards. At the 73rd British Academy Film Awards, it was nominated for Best Animated Film. The film won Best Animated Feature at the 25th Critics' Choice Awards. Toy Story 4 garnered a nomination for Best Animated Feature Film at the 77th Golden Globe Awards. Various critic circles also picked Toy Story 4 as the best animated feature film of the year.

== Accolades ==
Accolades received by Toy Story 4
Award	Date of ceremony	Category	Recipient(s)	Result	Ref.
Academy Awards	February 9, 2020	Best Animated Feature	Josh Cooley, Mark Nielsen, and Jonas Rivera	Won	
Academy Awards	February 9, 2020	Best Original Song	Randy Newman for "I Can't Let You Throw Yourself Away"	Nominated	
Alliance of Women Film Journalists Awards	January 10, 2020	Best Animated Feature	Toy Story 4	Nominated	
Alliance of Women Film Journalists Awards	January 10, 2020	Best Animated Female	Annie Potts	Won	
American Cinema Editors Awards	January 17, 2020	Best Edited Animated Feature Film	Axel Geddes	Won	
Annie Awards	January 25, 2020	Best Animated Feature	Toy Story 4	Nominated	
Annie Awards	January 25, 2020	Outstanding Achievement for Animated Effects in an Animated Production	Alexis Angelidis, Amit Ganapati Baadkar, Greg Gladstone, Kylie Wijsmuller, and Matthew Kiyoshi Wong	Nominated	
Annie Awards	January 25, 2020	Outstanding Achievement for Editorial in an Animated Feature Production	Axel Geddes, Torbin Xan Bullock, and Greg Snyder	Nominated	
Annie Awards	January 25, 2020	Outstanding Achievement for Music in an Animated Feature Production	Randy Newman	Nominated	
Annie Awards	January 25, 2020	Outstanding Achievement for Voice Acting in an Animated Feature Production	Tony Hale	Nominated	
Annie Awards	January 25, 2020	Outstanding Achievement for Writing in an Animated Feature Production	Andrew Stanton and Stephany Folsom	Nominated	
Art Directors Guild Awards	February 1, 2020	Excellence in Production Design for an Animated Film	Bob Pauley	Won	
Artios Awards	January 30, 2020	Animation	Kevin Reher and Natalie Lyon	Won (Note: Tied with The Lion King (2019))	
Austin Film Critics Association Awards	January 7, 2020	Best Animated Film	Toy Story 4	Won	
Black Reel Awards	February 6, 2020	Outstanding Voice Performance	Keegan-Michael Key	Nominated	
Black Reel Awards	February 6, 2020	Outstanding Voice Performance	Jordan Peele	Nominated	
British Academy Children's Awards	December 1, 2019	Feature Film	Toy Story 4	Nominated	
British Academy Film Awards	February 2, 2020	Best Animated Film	Josh Cooley and Mark Nielsen	Nominated	
Boston Society of Film Critics Awards	December 15, 2019	Best Animated Film	Toy Story 4	Runner-up	
Capri Hollywood International Film Festival	January 2, 2020	Best Animated Film	Toy Story 4	Won	
Chicago Film Critics Association Awards	December 14, 2019	Best Animated Film	Toy Story 4	Won	
Cinema Audio Society Awards	January 25, 2020	Outstanding Achievement in Sound Mixing for a Motion Picture – Animated	Doc Kane, Nathan Nance, Michael Semanick, David Bouche, Vince Caro, and Scott Curtis	Won	
Critics' Choice Movie Awards	January 12, 2020	Best Animated Feature	Toy Story 4	Won	
Dallas–Fort Worth Film Critics Association Awards	December 16, 2019	Best Animated Film	Toy Story 4	Won	
Detroit Film Critics Society Awards	December 9, 2019	Best Animated Feature	Toy Story 4	Won	
Florida Film Critics Circle Awards	December 23, 2019	Best Animated Film	Toy Story 4	Nominated	
Georgia Film Critics Association Awards	January 10, 2020	Best Animated Film	Toy Story 4	Won	
Golden Globe Awards	January 5, 2020	Best Animated Feature Film	Toy Story 4	Nominated	
Golden Raspberry Awards	March 16, 2020	Razzie Redeemer Award	Keanu Reeves (Note: Also for John Wick: Chapter 3 – Parabellum (2019))	Nominated	
Golden Reel Awards	January 19, 2020	Outstanding Achievement in Sound Editing – Sound Effects, Foley, Dialogue and ADR for Animated Feature Film	Coya Elliott, Ren Klyce, Cheryl Nardi, Kimberly Patrick, Qianbaihui Yang, Jonathon Stevens, Thom Brennan, James Spencer, John Roesch, and Shelley Roden	Won	
Golden Trailer Awards	May 29, 2019	Best Animation/Family	"Stories" (MOCEAN)	Won	
Golden Trailer Awards	May 29, 2019	Best Animation/Family TV Spot (for a Feature Film)	"Carnival" (Workshop Creative)	Nominated	
Golden Trailer Awards	July 22, 2021	Best Home Ent Animation/Family	"Favorite Friends" (Aspect Ratio)	Nominated	
Grammy Awards	January 26, 2020	Best Song Written for Visual Media	Randy Newman for "The Ballad of the Lonesome Cowboy"	Nominated	
Hollywood Critics Association Awards	January 9, 2020	Best Animated Film	Toy Story 4	Won	
Hollywood Critics Association Awards	January 9, 2020	Best Visual Effects or Animated Performance	Tom Hanks	Nominated	
Hollywood Film Awards	November 3, 2019	Hollywood Animation Award	Toy Story 4	Won	
Houston Film Critics Society Awards	January 2, 2020	Best Animated Film	Toy Story 4	Won	
Humanitas Prize	January 24, 2020	Family Feature Film	John Lasseter, Andrew Stanton, Josh Cooley, Valerie LaPointe, Rashida Jones, Will McCormack, Martin Hynes, and Stephany Folsom	Nominated	
International Cinephile Society Awards	February 7, 2020	Best Animated Film	Toy Story 4	Nominated	
Kansas City Film Critics Circle Awards	December 15, 2019	Best Animated Feature	Toy Story 4	Won	
Los Angeles Film Critics Association Awards	December 8, 2019	Best Animated Film	Toy Story 4	Runner-up	
Movieguide Awards	January 24, 2020	Best Movie for Families	Toy Story 4	Nominated	
National Film & TV Awards	December 3, 2019	Best Animated Film	Toy Story 4	Won	
National Film & TV Awards	December 3, 2019	Best Performance in an Animated Movie	Tom Hanks	Nominated	
Nickelodeon Kids' Choice Awards	May 2, 2020	Favorite Animated Movie	Toy Story 4	Nominated	
Nickelodeon Kids' Choice Awards	May 2, 2020	Favorite Male Voice from an Animated Movie	Tom Hanks	Nominated	
Online Film Critics Society Awards	January 6, 2020	Best Animated Film	Toy Story 4	Won	
People's Choice Awards	November 10, 2019	Favorite Movie	Toy Story 4	Nominated	
People's Choice Awards	November 10, 2019	Favorite Family Movie	Toy Story 4	Nominated	
People's Choice Awards	November 10, 2019	Animated Movie Star	Tom Hanks	Nominated	
Producers Guild of America Awards	January 18, 2020	Best Animated Motion Picture	Mark Nielsen and Jonas Rivera	Won	
San Diego Film Critics Society Awards	December 9, 2019	Best Animated Feature	Toy Story 4	Runner-up	
San Francisco Bay Area Film Critics Circle Awards	December 16, 2019	Best Animated Feature	Toy Story 4	Nominated	
Satellite Awards	December 19, 2019	Best Animated or Mixed Media Feature	Toy Story 4	Nominated	
Satellite Awards	December 19, 2019	Best Original Song	Randy Newman for "The Ballad of the Lonesome Cowboy"	Nominated	
Saturn Awards	September 13, 2019	Best Animated Film	Toy Story 4	Nominated	
Saturn Awards	September 13, 2019	Best Fantasy Film	Toy Story 4	Won	
Seattle Film Critics Society Awards	December 16, 2019	Best Animated Feature	Toy Story 4	Won	
St. Louis Film Critics Association Awards	December 15, 2019	Best Animated Feature	Toy Story 4	Won	
Teen Choice Awards	August 11, 2019	Choice Summer Movie	Toy Story 4	Nominated	
Toronto Film Critics Association Awards	December 8, 2019	Best Animated Film	Toy Story 4	Nominated	
Visual Effects Society Awards	January 29, 2020	Outstanding Created Environment in an Animated Feature	Josh Cooley, Mark Nielsen, Bob Moyer, and Gary Bruins	Nominated	
Visual Effects Society Awards	January 29, 2020	Outstanding Animated Character in an Animated Feature	Radford Hurn, Tanja Krampfert, George Nguyen, and Becki Rocha Tower for "Bo Peep"	Nominated	
Visual Effects Society Awards	January 29, 2020	Outstanding Created Environment in an Animated Feature	Hosuk Chang, Andrew Finley, Alison Leaf, and Philip Shoebottom for "Antique Mall"	Won	
Visual Effects Society Awards	January 29, 2020	Outstanding Effects Simulations in an Animated Feature	Alexis Angelidis, Amit Baadkar, Lyon Liew, and Michael Lorenzen	Nominated	
Visual Effects Society Awards	January 29, 2020	Outstanding Virtual Cinematography in a CG Project	Jean-Claude Kalache and Patrick Lin	Nominated	
Washington D.C. Area Film Critics Association Awards	December 8, 2019	Best Animated Feature	Toy Story 4	Nominated	
Washington D.C. Area Film Critics Association Awards	December 8, 2019	Best Voice Performance	Tom Hanks	Nominated	
Washington D.C. Area Film Critics Association Awards	December 8, 2019	Best Voice Performance	Tony Hale	Won	
Washington D.C. Area Film Critics Association Awards	December 8, 2019	Best Voice Performance	Annie Potts	Nominated	

== See also ==
- List of accolades received by Toy Story 3
