= American Cinema Editors Awards 2011 =

61st ACE Eddie Awards
- Presented by: American Cinema Editors
- Date: February 19, 2011
- Site: The Beverly Hilton, Beverly Hills, California

Highlights
- Best Film: Drama: The Social Network
- Best Film: Musical or Comedy: Alice in Wonderland

The 61st American Cinema Editors Eddie Awards, which were presented on Saturday, February 19, 2011 at the Beverly Hilton Hotel, honored the best editors in films and television.

Nominees were announced on January 14, 2011.

== Winners and nominees ==
The winners are listed first and in bold.

=== Film ===
Best Edited Feature Film – Dramatic:

Angus Wall and Kirk Baxter - The Social Network

- Andrew Weisblum - Black Swan
- Pamela Martin - The Fighter
- Lee Smith - Inception
- Tariq Anwar - The King's Speech

Best Edited Feature Film – Comedy or Musical:

Chris Lebenzon – Alice in Wonderland

- Susan Littenberg – Easy A
- Jeffrey M. Werner – The Kids Are All Right
- Michael Parker – Made in Dagenham
- Jonathan Amos & Paul Machliss – Scott Pilgrim vs. the World

Best Edited Animated Feature Film:

Ken Schretzmann & Lee Unkrich – Toy Story 3

- Gregory Perler & Pam Ziegenhagen - Despicable Me
- Maryann Brandon & Darren T. Holmes – How to Train Your Dragon

Best Edited Documentary Film:

Tom Fulford & Chris King – Exit Through the Gift Shop

- Chad Beck & Adam Bolt – Inside Job
- Jay Cassidy, Greg Finton & Kim Roberts - Waiting for "Superman"

=== Television ===
Best Edited Half-Hour Series for Television:

Jonathan Schwartz - Modern Family - "Family Portrait"

- Brian A. Kates - The Big C - "Pilot"
- Anne McCabe - Nurse Jackie - "Years of Service"

Best Edited One Hour Series for Commercial Television:

Hunter Via - The Walking Dead - "Days Gone Bye"

- Kelley Dixon – Breaking Bad - "Sunset"
- Mark Conte – Friday Night Lights - "I Can't"
- Bradley Buecker, Doc Crotzer, Joe Leonard & John Roberts – Glee - "Journey"
- Scott Vickrey – The Good Wife - "Running"

Best Edited One Hour Series for Non-Commercial Television:

Kate Sanford & Alexander Hall – Treme - "Do You Know What it Means"

- Sidney Wolinsky - Boardwalk Empire - "Pilot"
- Louis Cioffi – Dexter - "Take It"

Best Edited Mini-Series or Motion Picture for Television:

Leo Trombetta – Temple Grandin

- Marta Evry & Alan Cody – The Pacific - "Okinawa"
- Aaron Yanes – You Don’t Know Jack

Best Edited Reality Series:

Rob Goubeaux, Mark S. Andrew, Paul Coyne, Jeremy Gantz, Heather Miglin, Hilary Scratch, John Skaare & Ken Yankee - If You Really Knew Me - "Colusa High"

- Kelly Coskran & Josh Earl – The Deadliest Catch - "Redemption Day"
- Yvette Mangassarian-Amirian, Eric Myerson, Michael Caballero, David Michael Maurer & Edward Salier - Whale Wars 3 - "Vendetta"

=== Student Film Awards ===
- **Andrew Hellesen - Chapman University**
  - Adam Blum - Chapman University
  - Michael Hyde - American University

== Honorary Awards ==
- Christopher Nolan - Golden Eddie Award
