= Toy Story 4 =

2019 film by Josh Cooley

- Theatrical release poster
- Directed by: Josh Cooley
- Screenplay by: Andrew Stanton; Stephany Folsom
- Story by: John Lasseter; Andrew Stanton; Josh Cooley; Valerie LaPointe; Rashida Jones; Will McCormack; Martin Hynes; Stephany Folsom
- Produced by: Mark Nielsen; Jonas Rivera; Galyn Susman (Note: Although she is credited under "producer" in the end crawl for the film, she is not credited alongside Nielsen or Rivera in the "produced by" credit, nor was she a recipient for the awards the film received.)
- Starring: Tom Hanks; Tim Allen; Annie Potts; Tony Hale; Keegan-Michael Key; Jordan Peele; Madeleine McGraw; Christina Hendricks; Keanu Reeves; Ally Maki; Joan Cusack
- Cinematography: Patrick Lin; Jean-Claude Kalache
- Edited by: Axel Geddes
- Music by: Randy Newman
- Production company: Pixar Animation Studios
- Distributed by: Walt Disney Studios; Motion Pictures (Note: Distributed under the Walt Disney Pictures banner.)
- Release dates: June 11, 2019 (El Capitan Theatre); June 21, 2019 (United States)
- Running time: 100 minutes
- Country: United States
- Language: English
- Budget: $200 million
- Box office: $1.074 billion

Toy Story 4 is a 2019 American animated comedy-drama film directed by Josh Cooley and written by Andrew Stanton and Stephany Folsom. Produced by Pixar Animation Studios for Walt Disney Pictures, it is the fourth installment in Pixar's Toy Story film series. It features Tom Hanks, Tim Allen, Annie Potts, and Joan Cusack among the reprising roles, with Tony Hale, Keegan-Michael Key, Jordan Peele, Christina Hendricks, Keanu Reeves, and Ally Maki joining the cast. Toy Story 4 follows Woody as he, Buzz Lightyear, and the other toys go on a road trip with their new owner, Bonnie, who brings along with her, Forky, a spork made with recycled materials from her school. During the trip, Woody is reunited with Bo Peep, and must decide where his loyalties lie. Don Rickles, who died in 2017, posthumously reprises his role as Mr. Potato Head through unused archive audio. (Note: This is the first posthumous film performance by Rickles, who died in early 2017 and appears through the use of previously-recorded material.)

Talks for a fourth Toy Story film began in 2010, shortly before the release of Toy Story 3. When the film was officially announced in November 2014 during an investor's call, it was reported that the it would be directed by Toy Story co-creator John Lasseter, who later announced it would be a love story, after co-writing a film treatment. Cooley was announced as the film's co-director in March 2015, and ultimately replaced Lasseter as the director. The script went through many revisions with Cooley, Stanton, Folsom, Lasseter, Rashida Jones, Will McCormack, Valerie LaPointe, and Martin Hynes all receiving story credit. Composer Randy Newman returned to score the film, marking his ninth collaboration with Pixar.

Toy Story 4 premiered in Hollywood, Los Angeles, on June 11, 2019, and was released in the United States on June 21. It grossed $1.074 billion worldwide, becoming the eighth-highest-grossing film of 2019 and is the highest-grossing film in the franchise, marginally surpassing Toy Story 3. Like its predecessors, the film received acclaim from critics, with praise for its story, humor, emotional depth, musical score, animation, and vocal performances. The film was nominated for two awards at the 92nd Academy Awards, winning Best Animated Feature, and received numerous other accolades. A sequel, Toy Story 5, was released on June 19, 2026.

== Plot ==
Nine years ago, Woody and Bo Peep rescue Andy's remote control car, RC, from being washed away in a storm, before Bo and her lamp are donated to a new owner. Woody attempts to rescue her, but she insists it is okay as it is "time for the next kid". She asks Woody to come with her but when he hears Andy calling out for him, he chooses to stay.

In the present day, after a college-bound Andy has donated his toys to Bonnie, (Note: As depicted in Toy Story 3 (2010)) Woody struggles to adapt as she shows little interest in playing with him and her toys already have a leader. Bonnie is quite nervous about starting kindergarten, so Woody sneaks into her backpack as moral support. When she creates a toy from a spork at her kindergarten orientation, it comes to life as Forky, who immediately suffers an existential crisis, seeing himself as trash and not a toy. As Forky quickly becomes Bonnie's favorite toy, Woody tries to stop Forky from throwing himself away.

When Bonnie's family goes on a road trip, Forky jumps out of the window of the RV, and Woody goes after him. As they walk to the park, Woody convinces Forky that his place is with Bonnie, and Forky overcomes his existential crisis. As they pass an antique store, he recognizes Bo Peep's lamp in the window, and detours inside to find her. They encounter a talking doll named Gabby Gabby and her ventriloquist dummy friends, who try to take Woody's voicebox to replace Gabby's broken one. Woody escapes, though Forky becomes Gabby's prisoner. At a playground nearby, Woody reunites with Bo and her sheep, who have become "lost toys", free from owners and able to do as they please, along with their new friend Giggle McDimples. They agree to help Woody rescue Forky.

Buzz Lightyear, trying to find Woody, gets lost in a traveling carnival and encounters prize toys Bunny and Ducky. They find Woody and Bo, who take them to stunt bike toy Duke Caboom. They attempt to rescue Forky, only to nearly get killed by the store owner's cat Dragon. The toys refuse to go back due to the danger, but Woody, overwhelmed by the ordeal of being neglected by Bonnie, indirectly ensued a dispute with Bo who dejectedly leaves with the others except Buzz. Upon confronting Gabby, she explains that she means no harm, only wanting his voice box so she can be played with by the store owner's granddaughter, Harmony. Woody voluntarily sacrifices his voice box to Gabby, in exchange for the safe return of Forky, only for Harmony to reject Gabby afterwards.

Woody sends Forky to the RV and convinces Gabby to return to Bonnie with him. Bo and the rest of the gang return and help the pair escape, and Bo and Woody reconcile. Buzz and Jessie rally Bonnie's toys to use the RV to drive back to the fair. On the way, Gabby notices a lost child at the carnival and leaves the group to comfort her until the parents arrive; the girl takes Gabby with her. Woody chooses to stay with Bo as a "lost toy" with Buzz's encouragement to live in happiness. Woody shares an emotional goodbye with his friends as they return to the RV and leave the fair. Some time later, the "lost toys" help prize toys find owners, while Bonnie creates a companion for Forky from a plastic knife.

== Voice cast ==
- Tom Hanks as Woody
- Tim Allen as Buzz Lightyear
- Annie Potts as Bo Peep
- Tony Hale as Forky, a toy that Bonnie makes out of a plastic spork.
- Keegan-Michael Key as Ducky, a duck plush whose hand is attached to Bunny and was originally a carnival prize.
- Madeleine McGraw as Bonnie. McGraw replaces Emily Hahn, who voiced Bonnie in previous Toy Story media.
- Christina Hendricks as Gabby Gabby, a doll who tries to steal Woody's voice box in hopes of repairing hers and finding a kid for herself.
- Jordan Peele as Bunny, a bunny plush whose hand is attached to Ducky and was originally a carnival prize.
- Keanu Reeves as Duke Caboom, a motorcyclist toy who is devastated by his previous owner's disappointement in him.
- Ally Maki as Giggle McDimples, a tiny policewoman toy who is friends with Bo and usually sits on her shoulder.
- Jay Hernandez as Bonnie's dad
- Lori Alan as Bonnie's mom
- Joan Cusack as Jessie

Reprising their roles from previous Toy Story films are Bonnie Hunt as Dolly, Kristen Schaal as Trixie, Wallace Shawn as Rex, John Ratzenberger as Hamm, Blake Clark as Slinky Dog, Jeff Garlin as Buttercup, Estelle Harris as Mrs. Potato Head (in her final film role before her death in 2022), Timothy Dalton as Mr. Pricklepants, and Jeff Pidgeon as the Aliens.

Don Rickles, who died in 2017, posthumously reprises his role as Mr. Potato Head through unused archive audio from previous Toy Story media; Carl Weathers reprises his role as Combat Carl from Toy Story of Terror!; John Morris and Laurie Metcalf reprise their roles as Andy and his mom during the film's prologue, while Jack McGraw voices Andy as a child.

Mel Brooks, Carol Burnett, Betty White, and Carl Reiner, respectively, voice baby toy versions of themselves seen in Bonnie's room known as Melephant Brooks, Chairol Burnett, Bitey White, and Carl Reineroceros; Alan Oppenheimer voices Old Timer, also found in Bonnie's closet; Emily Davis voices Billy, Goat, and Gruff, Bo's three-headed sheep; Steve Purcell voices Benson and The Dummies, Gabby Gabby's henchmen; Melissa Villaseñor voices Karen Beverly, a toy made out of a knife whom Forky falls in love with, in a mid-credits sequence.

Additional voices include June Squibb as Margaret, the owner of the antique store, Lila Sage Bromley as Margaret's granddaughter Harmony, Patricia Arquette as her mom; Maliah Bargas-Good as a lost girl in the carnival, Juliana Hansen as Miss Wendy, Bonnie's kindergarten teacher, Bill Hader as Axel the Carnie, Flea as the Duke Caboom commercial announcer, and Rickey Henderson as an Oakland Athletics bobblehead figure.

== Production ==
=== Development ===
Development on Toy Story 4 began shortly before the release of Toy Story 3 (2010). Tom Hanks and Tim Allen had tentatively signed on to reprise their respective roles of Woody and Buzz; Hanks stated the following year that he believed Pixar was working on a sequel. Then-studio head of Pixar John Lasseter, who directed the first two films and executive-produced the third, was scheduled to return to direct after writing a film treatment with Andrew Stanton, with input from Pete Docter and Lee Unkrich. Rashida Jones and Will McCormack joined as writers, with Galyn Susman returning as a producer from Toy Story short subjects. Lasseter explained that Pixar decided to produce the sequel because of their "pure passion" for the series, and that the film would be a love story. He also felt that "[Pixar] never even talked about doing another Toy Story film. But when Andrew, Pete, Lee and I came up with this new idea, I just could not stop thinking about it. It was so exciting to me, I knew we had to make this movie—and I wanted to direct it myself". According to Lasseter, the film was kept so secret that even Morris and his boss Edwin Catmull had no knowledge of it until the treatment was finished. He stressed that "we do not do any sequel because we want to print money" but rather to tell a new story.

In March 2015, Pixar president Jim Morris described the film as a romantic comedy and said it would not be a continuation of the third film. Josh Cooley was revealed to be the film's co-director that month. While concluding work on Inside Out (2015) and directing its short Riley's First Date (2015), Cooley was invited by Lasseter to join the project as co-director, a role Cooley accepted. Docter, Hanks, and producer Jonas Rivera were conscious that Cooley made another "younger generation" for filmmakers. At the D23 Expo in August 2015, Lasseter revealed that Toy Story 4 would be a love story between Woody and Bo Peep, and the story would involve Woody and Buzz Lightyear setting out to find and bring Bo back home. In 2016, Cooley replaced Lasseter as the director of the film and re-conceived the story as well as the purpose of Bo's return to the series. At the D23 Expo in July 2017, Pixar announced Cooley as the film's new director. In November 2017, Jones and McCormack were revealed to have withdrawn during production, citing "philosophical differences".

=== Writing ===
It was important that it felt like [Toy Story 4] wasn't just another adventure. It had to have meaning to it, so that it left as important as the last one. I knew that there had to be a major change to Woody, and I used the fact that I was in this whole new position [as a first-time feature director] and the way I was feeling as inspiration for Woody being in a whole new room—a whole new position—as well. My questions and insecurity and not knowing quite how it was all going to develop were my inspiration.

— Director Josh Cooley

After writing a treatment for Toy Story 3 (2010), Stanton wrote one for Toy Story 4. This enabled Cooley to explore more ideas for Woody's overall story in the franchise, including an attempt to conclude the character's arc. Cooley and Rivera considered Toy Story 3 as the culmination of Woody and Andy's relationship; Rivera reasoned it that the franchise's focus was Woody.

By January 2018, Disney had confirmed that the screenplay was being written by Stephany Folsom, who eventually rewrote three quarters of Jones and McCormack's original script, according to Annie Potts. Folsom collaborated on the screenplay with Stanton, who had co-written the first two films.

According to Cooley, the center of the film's updated screenplay was around the relationship of Woody and Bo Peep. Bo Peep had been absent in Toy Story 3, explained narratively as Bo Peep having been given away. This had set the stage for the conclusion of the third film, with Woody getting the idea to give Andy's toys to Bonnie. Cooley said that when they thought about bringing Bo Peep back in the fourth film, it was not only to rekindle the romantic interest between Woody and Bo Peep. Bo Peep's becoming a lost toy also reflects a fear Woody has had through the series, and challenges his world view. Allen said that the film's story was "so emotional" that he "couldn't even get through the last scene". Similarly, Hanks called the film's ending scene a "moment in history".

=== Casting ===
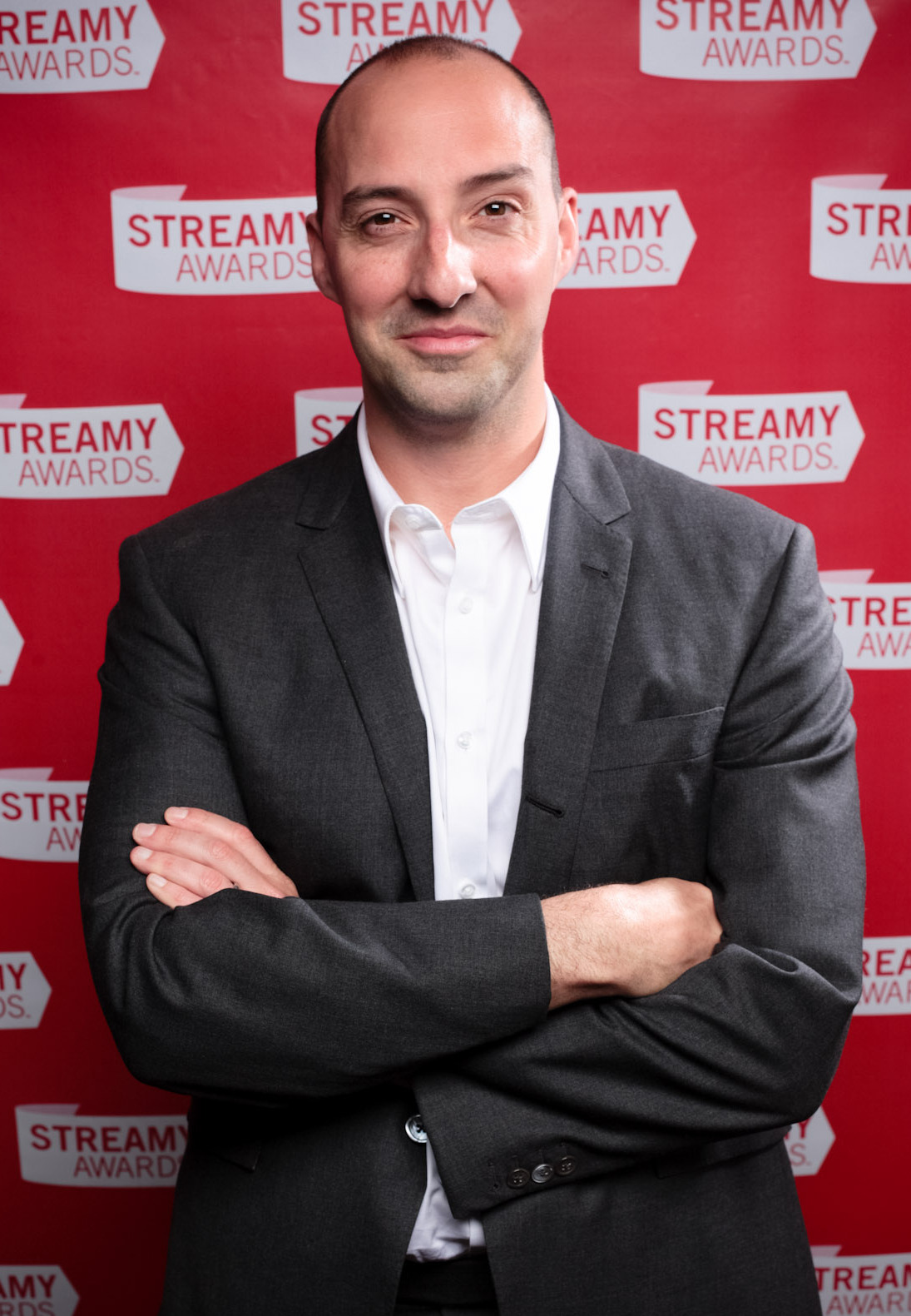
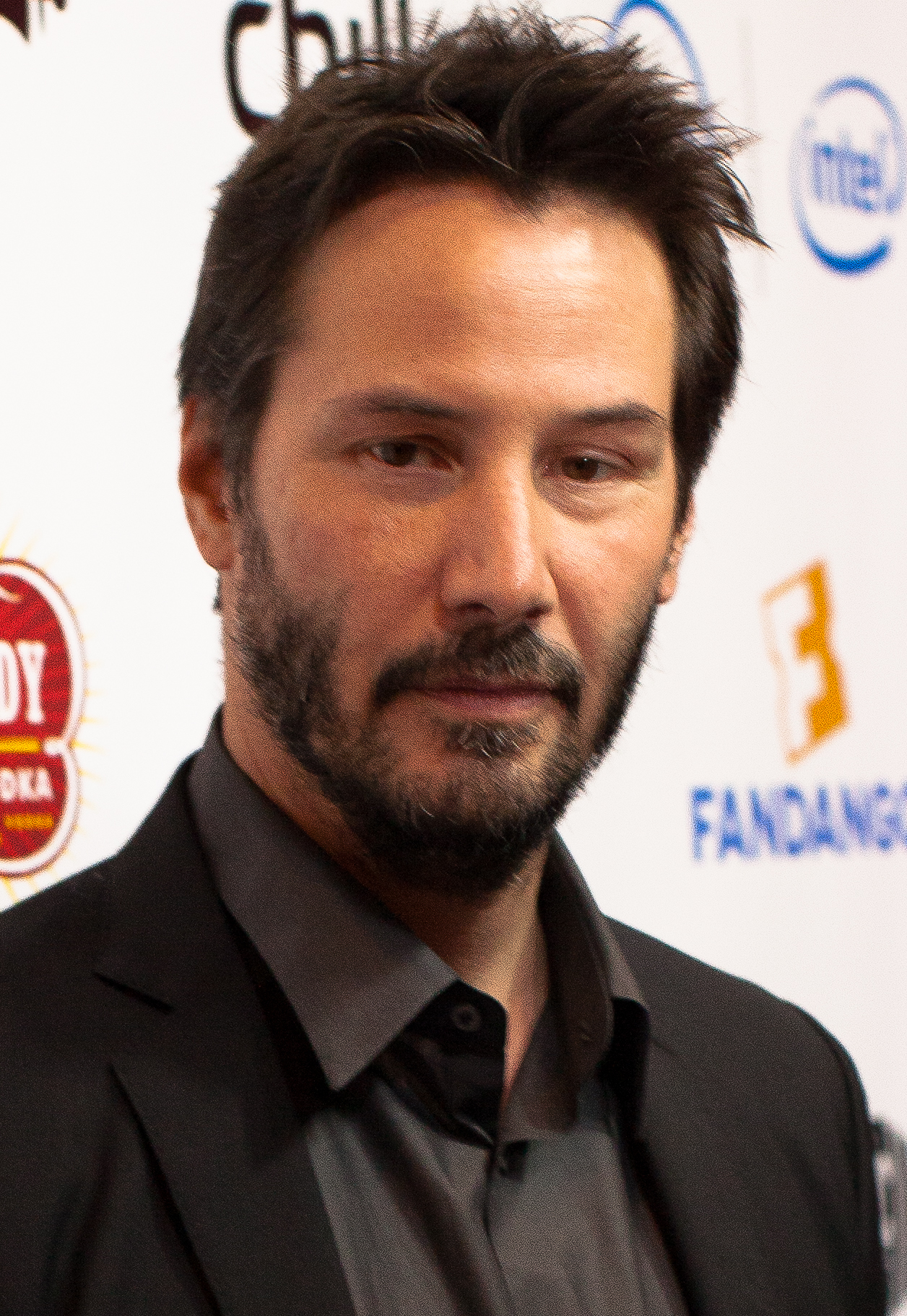
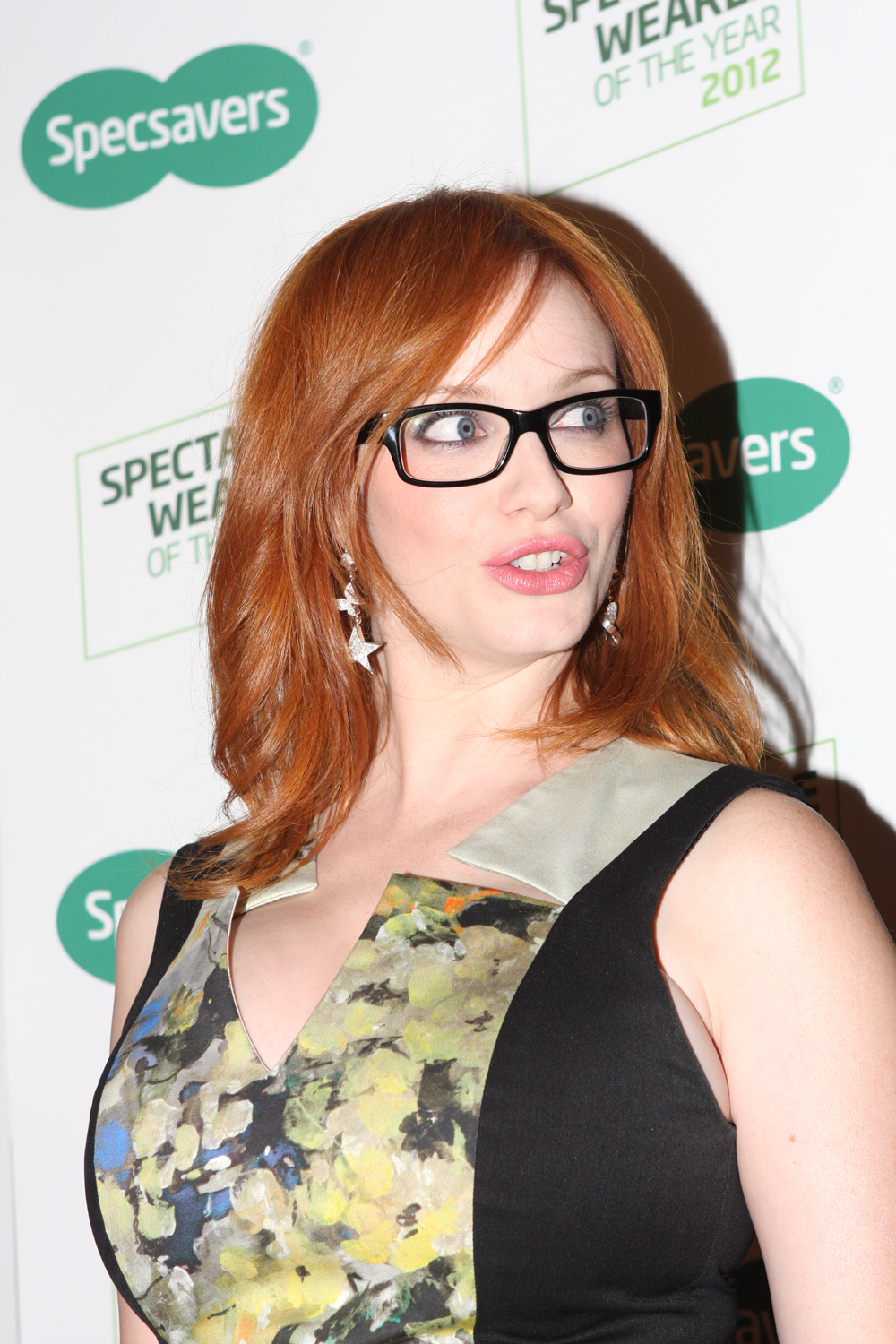
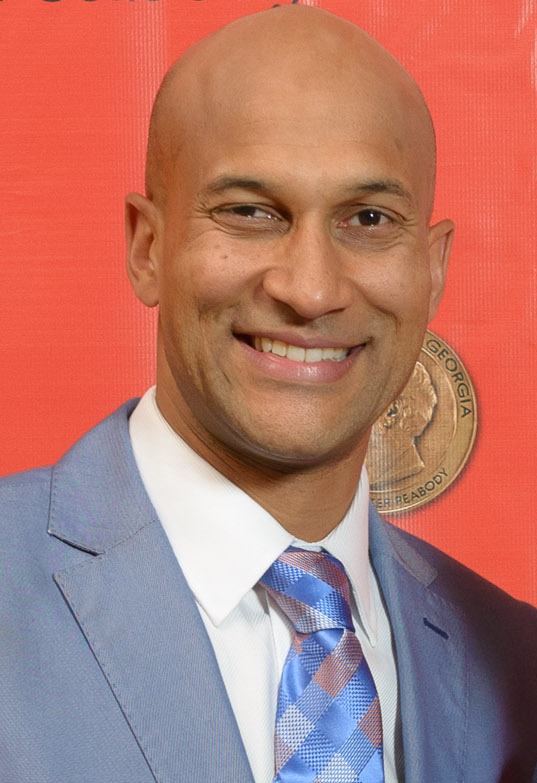
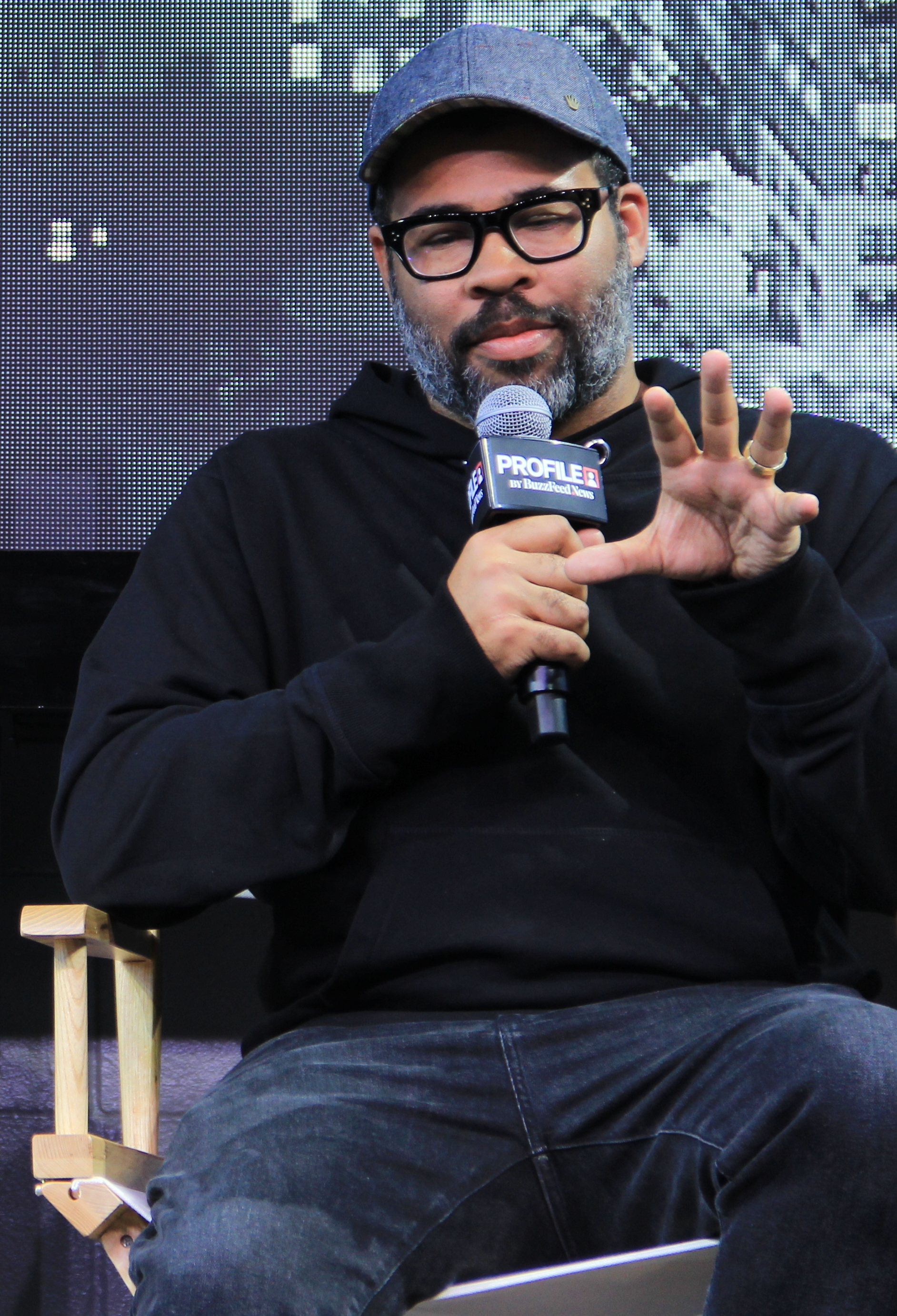
(L to R) Tony Hale, Keanu Reeves, Christina Hendricks, Keegan-Michael Key and Jordan Peele voice new characters in Toy Story 4.

Voice recording began in September 2018 and ended in January 2019. Most of the previous voice actors, including Hanks and Allen, signed on to reprise their roles. Hanks stated in May 2016 that he had recorded his first lines for Woody. Potts was confirmed to return as Bo Peep, after being absent from Toy Story 3. She was told by Pixar's then chief creative officer John Lasseter that her character's absence in the third film was attributed to them saving her for the fourth. Don Rickles intended to reprise his role as Mr. Potato Head, but died in April 2017, before any lines were recorded as the script was still being rewritten. According to Cooley, Rickles' family contacted Pixar to search ways for his inclusion in the film. Pixar reviewed 25 years of archival material that Rickles had participated in, including unused lines from the first three Toy Story films, video games and other related media for the franchise, and other works, and repurposed them for use within the film. The film is dedicated to both Rickles and animator Adam Burke, who died in 2017 and 2018, respectively.

Tony Hale was cast as Forky, a homemade toy suffering an existential crisis. Hale has performed roles before with similar panicked characters, including Buster Bluth on Arrested Development and Gary Walsh on Veep. When asked to voice Forky, Hale said, "A utensil's existential crisis? I'm in!" Keegan-Michael Key and Jordan Peele were cast as a pair of carnival prize plush toys named Ducky and Bunny. Cooley said that while they brought them on to provide some improvised comedy to the film, "they were story motivated which elevated Ducky and Bunny and the film to a level I never could have expected." Additionally, Keanu Reeves was announced to be voicing a character in the film named Duke Caboom. Reeves said he was contacted by Pixar, much to his surprise, with the intention of voicing the part and letting him develop the character's verbal mannerisms. On March 22, 2019, Madeleine McGraw, who had previously voiced Maddy McGear in Pixar's Cars 3, was revealed to be voicing Bonnie, who was voiced by Emily Hahn in the previous film and other works. Comedians Carol Burnett, Mel Brooks, Carl Reiner, and Betty White were added to the cast to voice a set of four toys that Bonnie played with as a toddler but had since outgrown, acting as "veteran" toys to help Woody prepare for when the same happens to him.

== Music ==
Randy Newman, who composed and wrote songs for the previous three films, was confirmed to be returning during the 2015 D23 Expo. Director Josh Cooley said that he hired Newman to return because he "can't imagine making a fourth [film] without Randy Newman." Newman wrote new themes for Bonnie, Gabby Gabby, and Duke Caboom, with the latter's featuring accordions and mandolins to represent the character's memories of rejection. He also wrote a "subordinate theme" for Forky. Newman also reused his previous orchestral themes from the first three films. He wrote two new songs for the film, titled "The Ballad of the Lonesome Cowboy" and "I Can't Let You Throw Yourself Away", with Newman also performing the latter. On June 5, 2019, Chris Stapleton's version of "Cowboy" was released as a single. The film's soundtrack, featuring Newman's score, Stapleton's and Newman's versions of the two new songs, and Newman's "You've Got a Friend in Me", was released on June 21, 2019.

== Release ==
The film was initially scheduled for release on June 16, 2017, but was postponed to June 15, 2018, and finally to June 21, 2019, with Pixar handing the 2018 release date to Incredibles 2. Toy Story 4 premiered on June 11, 2019, at the El Capitan Theatre in Hollywood, Los Angeles. The film was also released in IMAX. A scene from the film briefly shows a couple of lesbian mothers with a child at a kindergarten orientation. This prompted One Million Moms, a conservative group in the United States, to call for a boycott of Toy Story 4.

=== Marketing ===
Toy Story 4 broke Pixar's tradition of having each of their films released with a theatrical short. With the exception of Toy Story (1995) and Coco (2017) which were only preceded by a short film in a limited capacity in theaters or home video, each of Pixar's first 20 feature films from A Bug's Life (1998) to Cars 3 (2017) and Incredibles 2 (2018) were preceded by a new in-house Pixar short film for their entire initial worldwide theatrical runs and on their initial home video releases. Toy Story 4 was instead not accompanied by a short film at any point during its theatrical run or on home video. Toy Story 4 producers Mark Nielsen and Jonas Rivera explained that the people at the studio were needed to work on their feature films at the time which did not allow for the resources to make their usual short films, and they also cited the studio's focus on making stand-alone short films in the form of the SparkShorts not necessarily attached to theatrical feature films moving forward.

=== Home media ===
Walt Disney Studios Home Entertainment released Toy Story 4 for digital download on October 1, 2019, and on Ultra HD Blu-ray, Blu-ray, and DVD on October 8. Physical copies contain behind-the-scenes featurettes and deleted scenes. The film made a revenue of $56.3 million from home video sales with 2.8 million units sold, making it the fifth best-selling film of 2019.

== Reception ==
=== Box office ===
Toy Story 4 grossed $434 million in the United States and Canada, and $639.8 million in other territories, for a worldwide total of $1.074 billion. It was the eighth-highest-grossing film of 2019. The film had a worldwide opening of $244.5 million, the biggest for an animated film at the time. It crossed the billion dollar mark on August 13, 2019, becoming the 43rd film as well as the fourth Pixar film to ever do so. It was also the fifth film released by Disney in 2019, and sixth overall, to cross the milestone, both records for a single year. Deadline Hollywood calculated the film's net profit as $368 million, accounting for production budgets, marketing, talent participations, and other costs; box office grosses and home media revenues placed it sixth on their list of 2019's "Most Valuable Blockbusters".

In the United States and Canada, on May 28, 2019, Toy Story 4 set the records on Fandango for most tickets sold by an animated film in its first 24 hours of pre-sales (besting Incredibles 2), while Atom Tickets reported it sold nearly 50% more than the previous three highest-selling animated films combined did in their first day (Incredibles 2, Ralph Breaks the Internet, and Hotel Transylvania 3: Summer Vacation). Released alongside Child's Play and Anna on June 21, 2019, Toy Story 4 played in 4,575 theaters, the second-most all-time behind Avengers: Endgame. Toy Story 4 made $47.4 million on its first day, including $12 million from Thursday night previews, the second-highest amount for an animated film, behind Incredibles 2. It went on to debut to $120.9 million. Although below projections, executives at Disney were satisfied with the debut, since it continued Pixar's "remarkable consistency" at the box office and showed "proof of audiences' long-time love for the Toy Story franchise." Additionally, it was the best opening of the series, the biggest for a G-rated film, and the fourth-highest of all-time for an animated film. The film opened in the number one spot and retained the top position at the box office the following weekend, but it was dethroned by Spider-Man: Far From Home in July. Its second weekend saw the box office drop by 51% to $59.7 million, and Toy Story 4 grossed another $34.3 million the following weekend. In August 2019, the film surpassed the traditionally animated version of The Lion King (1994, $422 million including re-releases), which held the title for the last 25 years (1994–2003 and 2011–2019) to become the highest-grossing G-rated film of all-time domestically. Toy Story 4 is also the highest-grossing G movie worldwide in history. It ended up being the fifth highest-grossing film of 2019 in this region.

In other territories, the film opened day-and-date with the U.S. in 37 countries (64% of its total market), and was projected to gross around $100 million abroad for a global debut of $260 million. In China, where the film opened alongside a re-release of Spirited Away (2001), it was expected to debut to $15–20 million. Through September 2, 2019, the film's largest markets were Japan ($90.1 million), the United Kingdom ($79.9 million, third highest all-time for an animated film), Mexico ($72 million), Brazil ($32.5 million), France ($29.2 million), China ($29.1 million), Argentina ($28.9 million), Australia ($28.9 million), and South Korea ($24.7 million).

=== Critical response ===
Toy Story 4 received widespread acclaim from film critics. On review aggregation website Rotten Tomatoes, Toy Story 4 holds an approval rating of 96% based on 461 reviews, with an average rating of 8.4/10. The website's critics consensus reads, "Heartwarming, funny, and beautifully animated, Toy Story 4 manages the unlikely feat of extending—and perhaps concluding—a practically perfect animated saga." Metacritic, which uses a weighted average, assigned the film a score of 84 out of 100 based on 57 critics, indicating "universal acclaim". Audiences polled by CinemaScore gave the film an average grade of "A" on an A+ to F scale, and 89% of those at PostTrak gave it a positive score, with 75% saying they would definitely recommend it.

The film received a four-star rating from Matt Zoller Seitz of RogerEbert.com, who wrote "This franchise has demonstrated an impressive ability to beat the odds and reinvent itself, over a span of time long enough for two generations to grow up in. It's a toy store of ideas, with new wonders in every aisle." The Washington Post's Ann Hornaday also gave the film four out of four stars and praised its "visually dazzling concoction of wily schemes and daring adventures", as well as achieving "a near-perfect balance between familiarity and novelty, action and emotion, and joyful hellos and more bittersweet goodbyes." Peter DeBruge of Variety wrote "Toy Story ushered in the era of computer-animated cartoon features, and the fourth movie wraps up the saga beautifully. At least, for now." The Daily Telegraph's Robbie Collin wrote "Toy Story 4 reaffirms that Pixar, at their best, are like no other animation studio around."

Writing for IndieWire, David Ehrlich gave the film a grade of B+ and wrote "Clever, breathless, and never manic just for the sake of keeping your kids' eyes busy, the action in Toy Story 4 is character-driven and paced to perfection." Peter Travers of Rolling Stone, who gave the film four-and-a-half stars out of five stars, praised its "visual pow, pinwheeling fun and soulful feeling" and lauded the voice performance of Tony Hale as Forky. Joe Morgenstern of The Wall Street Journal said that "the new film isn't flawless, but it's hugely enjoyable and speaks, with bewitching buoyancy, to nothing less than the purpose of living and the mystery of life." While Peter Rainer of The Christian Science Monitor wrote that the film did not put him "through the emotional wringer the way its predecessor did," he still gave it a grade of A− and said "it's consistently inventive, funny, witty, and heartfelt. In other words, it's a lot better than it has any right to be. It's more than good enough to justify its existence."

Conversely, Kyle Smith of National Review called the film "the weakest effort in the series", criticizing the characterization, and felt it prioritized comedy while the story's underlying themes were "tossed out haphazardly without much follow-through". He wrote, "It may be an essential element of Disney's corporate strategy, but as a film it's forgettable."

=== Accolades ===
At the 92nd Academy Awards, Toy Story 4 received a nomination for Best Original Song and won Best Animated Feature. The film's other nominations include six Annie Awards, a British Academy Film Award, a Critics' Choice Movie Award (which it won), and a Golden Globe Award.

== Post-release ==
=== Sequel ===
A sequel, Toy Story 5, was released on June 19, 2026.

=== Short film ===
A short film titled Lamp Life reveals Bo Peep's whereabouts between leaving and reuniting with Woody. The short was released on Disney+ on January 31, 2020.

=== Series ===
A 10-episode short-form educational series, Forky Asks a Question, debuted exclusively on the Disney+ streaming service upon its launch on November 12, 2019. It focuses mainly on Forky, but other Toy Story characters such as Rex, Hamm, Trixie, Buttercup, and Mr. Pricklepants also make appearances.

== Lawsuit ==
Disney and Pixar were sued by Kelly Knievel and K&K Promotions in September 2020 in a suit alleging that the character Duke Caboom represents creative use of Evel Knievel's likeness without permission. On September 23, 2021, the judge dismissed the case with the statement, "Duke Caboom is not a carbon copy of Evel Knievel minus a few details, The Duke Caboom action figure is a representation of Disney's expression in the film and not an attempt to imitate Evel Knievel."
