= Ken Schretzmann =

American film editor

- Occupation: Film editor

Ken Schretzmann is an American film editor known for animated features such as Cars (2006), Toy Story 3 (2010), The Lorax (2012), and The Secret Life of Pets (2016) as well as The Willoughbys (2020) and Pinocchio (2022).

Schretzmann received a bachelor's degree from Syracuse University in 1982. For about 12 years, Schretzmann worked on several animated features at Pixar Animation Studios. Schretzmann has received the ACE Eddie Award for Best Edited Animated Feature for Toy Story 3 (2010) and for Pinocchio (2022). Based on her interview of Schretzmann, Bobbie O'Steen describes the substantial differences between editing Pixar's animated feature films and editing a live-action feature. Among others, the animated films at Pixar each involved about 4 years of Schretzmann's work. He said, "'What took you so long? It's kind of a backwards process. You edit first then they shoot the film later. It's a long haul and for about the first two years we're in the story process."

Schretzmann has been selected for membership in the American Cinema Editors.

== Filmography ==
=== As an editor ===
Year	Title	Notes
1992	Titanica	Edited with James Lathi and David Wilson
1997	Cause N' Defect	
2000	The Modern Adventures of Tom Sawyer	
2006	Cars	
2010	Toy Story 3	
2012	The Lorax	Edited with Steven Liu and Clarie Dodgson
2013	Sides	Short film Edited with David O. Rogers
2016	The Secret Life of Pets	
2018	The Grinch	Additional editing
2019	Brooklyn Baby	Short film
2020	The Willoughbys	Edited with Fiona Toth
2022	Guillermo del Toro's Pinocchio	Edited with Holly Klein
2023	The Super Mario Bros. Movie	Additional editing
2025	In Your Dreams	Edited with T.M. Christopher, Greg Knowles, and Nick Kenway
