= Patrick Lin (cinematographer) =

Hong Kong–born cinematographer

- Chinese: 林敬雄
Transcriptions
Standard Mandarin
- Hanyu Pinyin: Lín Jìngxióng
Yue: Cantonese
- Jyutping: Lam^{4} Ging^{3} Hung^{4}

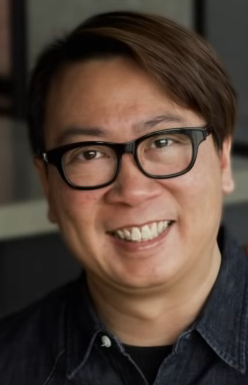
Patrick Lin in 2016

Patrick Lin (Chinese: 林敬雄) is a Hong Kong–born cinematographer and layout artist who works for Pixar. He was the director of photography on The Incredibles (2004), Up (2009), Inside Out (2015) and Toy Story 4 (2019).

== Early life ==
Lin was born and raised in British Hong Kong, where he attended St. Paul's Co-educational College. He moved to Canada at the age of 15, and later moved again to San Francisco to attend the California College of Arts, where he completed a Bachelor of Fine Arts in film and video.

== Career ==
Lin's first credited job in the film industry was as a camera and lighting assistant on James and the Giant Peach (1996). He later worked as a motion control photographer on Wag the Dog (1997), The Truman Show (1998) and X-Men (2000). He also worked as a location manager for Radio Television Hong Kong, assisting the company with filming in the United States.

Lin has worked at Pixar since he first joined in September 1997 as a layout artist on A Bug's Life (1998). He was the director of photography on The Incredibles (2004) and Up (2009), and a lead layout artist on Monsters, Inc. (2001) and Ratatouille (2007). He was also a contributing layout artist on Brave (2012) and Monsters University (2013). In 2015, Lin was the cinematographer on Pixar's Inside Out; his full credited title was "director of photography – camera and staging". On Inside Out, he pioneered Pixar's first use of a virtual camera lens based on an actual camera lens, so that the animation appears to be filmed on an actual camera. He later served as a layout artist on The Good Dinosaur (2015) and director of photography on Toy Story 4 (2019). In total, he has worked on over twenty Pixar projects, including feature films and short films.
