= John Morris (voice actor) =

American actor

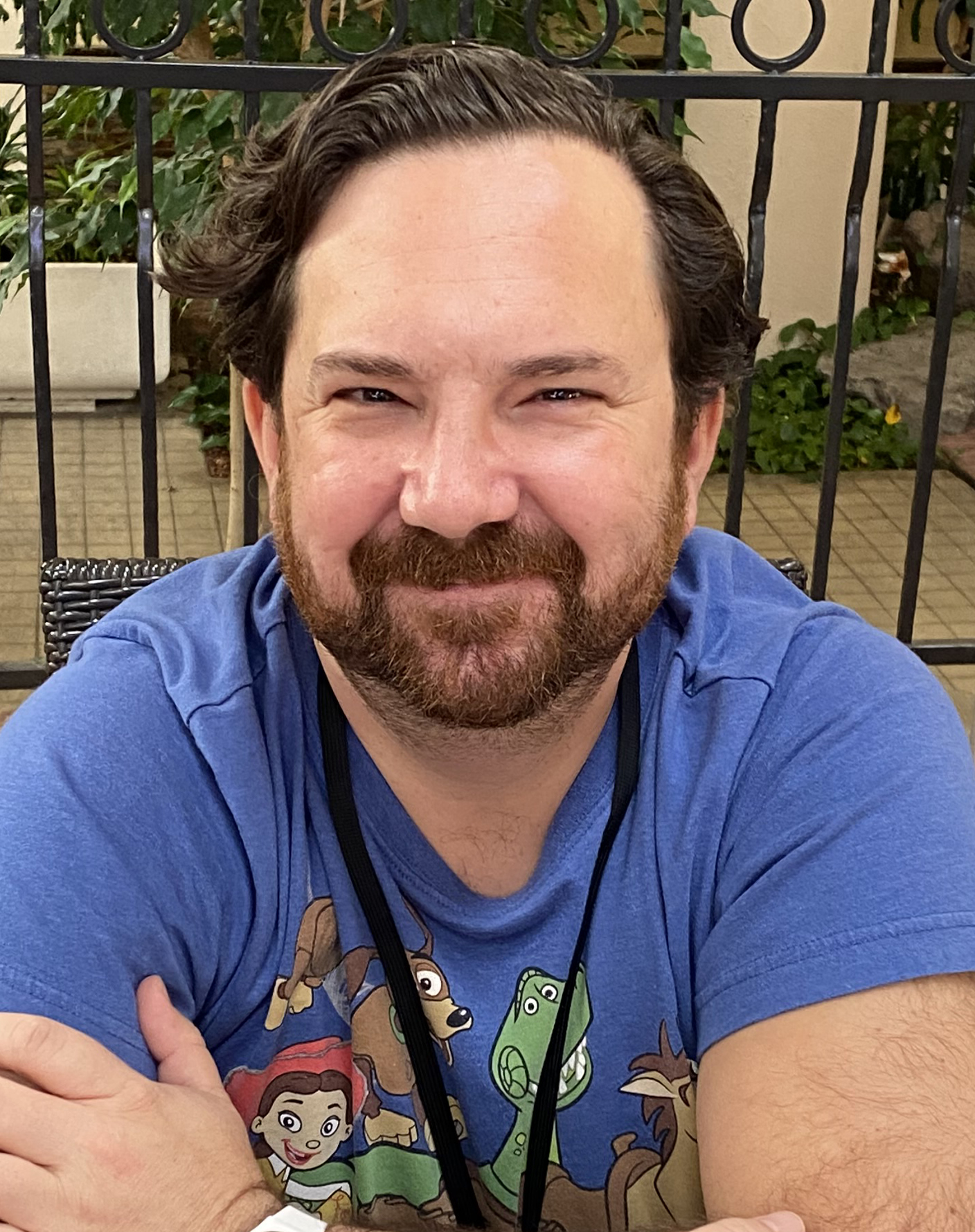
- Morris at Mouse-Con in November 2022
- Education: San Francisco University High School
- Alma mater: University of California, Los Angeles
- Occupation: Voice actor
- Years active: 1991–present

John Morris is an American voice actor. He is best known for his role as the voice of Andy Davis in the Toy Story films and their associated video games.

== Life and career ==
Morris graduated from the San Francisco University High School in San Francisco, California in 2003.

In 1993, while auditioning for the role of Andy in Toy Story, Morris brought some of his X-Men action figures and made voices for them; the Pixar staff loved it and gave him the part. Morris was brought back on to Toy Story 3 by the request of the director Lee Unkrich. On the Toy Story 3 Blu-ray/DVD, Unkrich elaborated that they first had to seek out contact information for Morris. Then, there was a growing concern over whether his voice would sound right. However, these fears were relieved when Unkrich first called Morris and heard his voicemail greeting.

He voiced "Pepper Roni" in the 1997 video game Lego Island.

A 2007 graduate from the University of California, Los Angeles School of Theater, Film & Television, as of 2010 Morris resides in the San Francisco Bay Area.

== Filmography ==
=== Film ===
Year	Title	Role	Notes
1993	The Nightmare Before Christmas	Santa Boy	Voice
1995	Toy Story	Andy Davis	Voice
1999	Toy Story 2	Andy Davis	Voice
2010	Toy Story 3	Andy Davis	Voice
2019	Toy Story 4	Andy Davis	Archival recordings

=== Television ===
Year	Title	Role	Notes
1997	The Wonderful World of Disney	Andy Davis	Voice, 1 episode
2001	Jason and the Heroes of Mount Olympus	Additional voices	Unknown episodes
2009	Disney Get Connected	Himself	
2010	That Fellow in the Coat	Andy Davis	Voice, Archival recordings Episode: "A Look Back at the Animated Features of 2010"
2016	Greatest Animated Movies	Himself	Documentary

=== Video games ===
Year	Title	Role	Notes
1995	Animated Storybook: Toy Story	Andy Davis	
1997	Lego Island	Pepper Roni	
2001	Nicktoons Nick Tunes	Otto Rocket (singing voice)	
2010	Toy Story 3	Andy Davis	
