= Kansas City Film Critics Circle =

American film critics organization

- Abbreviation: KCFCC
- Formation: 1966
- Founder: James Loutzenhiser
- Type: Film criticism
- Location: Kansas City, Missouri
- Official language: English
- Website: kcfcc.org

The Kansas City Film Critics Circle (KCFCC) is an American film critic organization founded in 1966 by James Loutzenhiser, who also served as its President until his death in 2001. The annual awards presented by the group for achievements in filmmaking are among the oldest in the United States which are bestowed by film critics, second only to the New York Film Critics Circle awards. Its members include reviewers and film scholars from various print publications and broadcasting stations based in Kansas City, Missouri.

== Awards ==
Each year since its founding, the KCFCC presents their annual Loutzenhiser Awards, with categories including Best Film, the Robert Altman Award for Best Director and the Vince Koehler Award for Outstanding Science Fiction, Fantasy or Horror Film.

=== Selected past winners ===
| Year | Best Film | Ref. |
|---|---|---|
| 2025 | One Battle After Another | |
| 2024 | The Substance | |
| 2023 | Oppenheimer | |
| 2022 | Everything Everywhere All at Once | |
| 2021 | The Power of the Dog | |
| 2020 | Nomadland and Promising Young Woman | |
| 2019 | 1917 | |
| 2018 | Roma and The Favourite | |
| 2017 | Get Out | |
| 2016 | Manchester by the Sea | |
| 2015 | Mad Max: Fury Road | |
| 2014 | Birdman | |
| 2013 | 12 Years a Slave | |
| 2012 | The Master | |
| 2011 | The Descendants | |
| 2010 | The Social Network | |
| 2009 | Up in the Air | |
| 2008 | Slumdog Millionaire | |
| 2007 | There Will Be Blood | |
| 2006 | United 93 | |
| 2005 | Munich | |
| 2004 | Million Dollar Baby | |
| 2003 | The Lord of the Rings: The Return of the King | |
| 2002 | The Lord of the Rings: The Two Towers | |
| 2001 | The Lord of the Rings: The Fellowship of the Ring | |
| 2000 | Traffic | |
