= Toy Story 3 =

2010 film by Lee Unkrich

- Theatrical release poster
- Directed by: Lee Unkrich
- Screenplay by: Michael Arndt
- Story by: John Lasseter; Andrew Stanton; Lee Unkrich
- Produced by: Darla K. Anderson
- Starring: Tom Hanks; Tim Allen; Joan Cusack; Don Rickles; Wallace Shawn; John Ratzenberger; Estelle Harris; Ned Beatty; Michael Keaton; Jodi Benson; John Morris
- Cinematography: Jeremy Lasky; Kim White
- Edited by: Ken Schretzmann
- Music by: Randy Newman
- Production company: Pixar Animation Studios
- Distributed by: Walt Disney Studios; Motion Pictures (Note: Distributed under the Walt Disney Pictures banner.)
- Release dates: June 12, 2010 (Taormina Film Fest); June 18, 2010 (United States)
- Running time: 103 minutes
- Country: United States
- Language: English
- Budget: $200 million
- Box office: $1.067 billion

Toy Story 3 is a 2010 American animated comedy-drama film directed by Lee Unkrich and written by Michael Arndt. Produced by Pixar Animation Studios for Walt Disney Pictures, it is the third installment in the Toy Story film series and the sequel to Toy Story 2 (1999). The film features the voices of Tom Hanks, Tim Allen, Joan Cusack, Don Rickles, Wallace Shawn, John Ratzenberger, Estelle Harris, Ned Beatty, Michael Keaton, Jodi Benson, and John Morris. In the film, Andy Davis, now a teenager, is going to college. Woody, Buzz Lightyear and the other toys are accidentally donated to the Sunnyside Daycare center by Andy's mother, and the toys must decide where their loyalties lie.

In 2004, following disagreements between the Walt Disney Company's CEO Michael Eisner and Pixar CEO Steve Jobs, Disney planned to make Toy Story 3 at the new Circle Seven Animation studio unit, with a tentative theatrical release date in early 2008. The script was developed in multiple versions. After Disney bought Pixar in early 2006, the Circle Seven version of the film was canceled as the result of Circle Seven's closure. The production was then transferred to Pixar, where a new script was developed. Randy Newman returned to compose the film's musical score. With a budget of $200 million, Toy Story 3 is one of the most expensive films ever made.

Toy Story 3 premiered at the Taormina Film Fest in Italy on June 12, 2010, and was released in the United States on June 18. It was the first film to be released theatrically with Dolby Surround 7.1 sound. Like its predecessors, the film received acclaim from critics, with praise for the vocal performances, screenplay, emotional depth, animation, and Newman's musical score. It grossed $1.067 billion worldwide, finishing its theatrical run as the highest-grossing film of 2010 and the fourth-highest grossing film of all time at the time of its release. It was also the first animated film to reach $1 billion at the box office, and was the highest-grossing animated film until the release of Frozen in 2013, and Pixar's highest-grossing film until the release of Incredibles 2 in 2018.

The National Board of Review, the American Film Institute and Cahiers du Cinéma named Toy Story 3 one of their top ten films of 2010. Amongst its numerous accolades, Toy Story 3 was nominated for five awards at the 83rd Academy Awards, winning Best Animated Feature and Best Original Song. It was the third animated film to be nominated for Best Picture. A sequel, Toy Story 4, was released in 2019.

== Plot ==
Andy Davis is 17 years old and preparing to leave for college. He decides to take Woody with him and puts Buzz Lightyear, Jessie, and the other toys in a bag to be stored in the attic. Andy's mother mistakenly takes the bag to the curb for garbage pickup. The toys escape and, believing Andy intended to throw them away, join Andy's sister Molly's Barbie in a donation box bound for Sunnyside Daycare. Woody pursues the others and fails to convince them of the truth.

Andy's toys are welcomed by the other toys at Sunnyside, and are given a tour of the seemingly perfect play-setting by Lots-O'-Huggin' Bear ("Lotso"), Big Baby, and Ken. Barbie falls in love with the latter. All the toys choose to stay, except Woody, who attempts to return home. A Sunnyside child named Bonnie finds Woody and takes him to her house, playing with him and her other toys.

After Andy's toys endure a rough playtime with the toddlers, Buzz asks Lotso to have himself and his friends moved to the older children's room, but is instead captured. Lotso is revealed to be running a police state among the daycare's toys; he tells Buzz he sends all newly arrived toys to the toddler room for his gang's safety, regardless of whether the new toys are age-appropriate or get broken. Seeing promise in Buzz, Lotso has him switched to demo mode, brainwashing him into believing Lotso is his commander. Meanwhile, Mrs. Potato Head, who lost an eye in Andy's room, sees an upset Andy searching for his toys. Andy's toys realize their mistake and attempt to leave, but are captured and imprisoned by Buzz on Lotso's orders.

At Bonnie's house, Woody meets a toy clown named Chuckles, and learns that Chuckles, Lotso, and Big Baby were once owned by a girl named Daisy. When the three toys were accidentally lost during a road trip, they traveled back to Daisy's house on foot, only to find that Daisy's parents had replaced Lotso. After convincing Big Baby that Daisy had replaced them and intimidating Chuckles to silence the truth, Lotso led the toys to Sunnyside, taking it over as a dictator.

Woody returns to Sunnyside and reunites with his friends. That night, the toys initiate an escape plan, accidentally resetting Buzz to Spanish mode in the process. "Spanish Buzz" immediately befriends Woody and begins a relationship with Jessie. The toys escape the building, getting as far as Sunnyside's dumpster, but Lotso and his gang thwart them. As a trash truck approaches, Woody reveals Lotso's deception to Big Baby, who promptly throws Lotso into the dumpster. Andy's toys attempt to escape, but Lotso pulls Woody in with him. Andy's other toys jump in to help, and fall into the truck, where a junked television hits Buzz and restores him to his normal persona.

The toys are brought to a local trash center, and most of them are dumped on a conveyor belt leading to an incinerator. Woody and Buzz help Lotso avoid a shredder, and later to reach an emergency stop button, but once he is safe, Lotso abandons them. Just as the toys are about to be burned, the Aliens rescue them with an industrial crane. A garbage truck driver later finds Lotso and straps him to his truck's radiator grille.

Woody and his friends ride another garbage truck back to Andy's house. Andy discovers a note from Woody and, assuming it is from his mother, donates the toys to Bonnie, who lives nearby. Andy introduces the toys individually to Bonnie, and is surprised to find Woody at the bottom of the donation box. After Bonnie recognizes Woody, an initially hesitant Andy passes him on to her. Andy plays with Bonnie before leaving; Woody bids him a quiet farewell, and the toys begin their new life with Bonnie.

Later, Woody and the other toys learn that Barbie, Ken, and Big Baby have improved the lives of the toys at Sunnyside.

== Voice cast ==
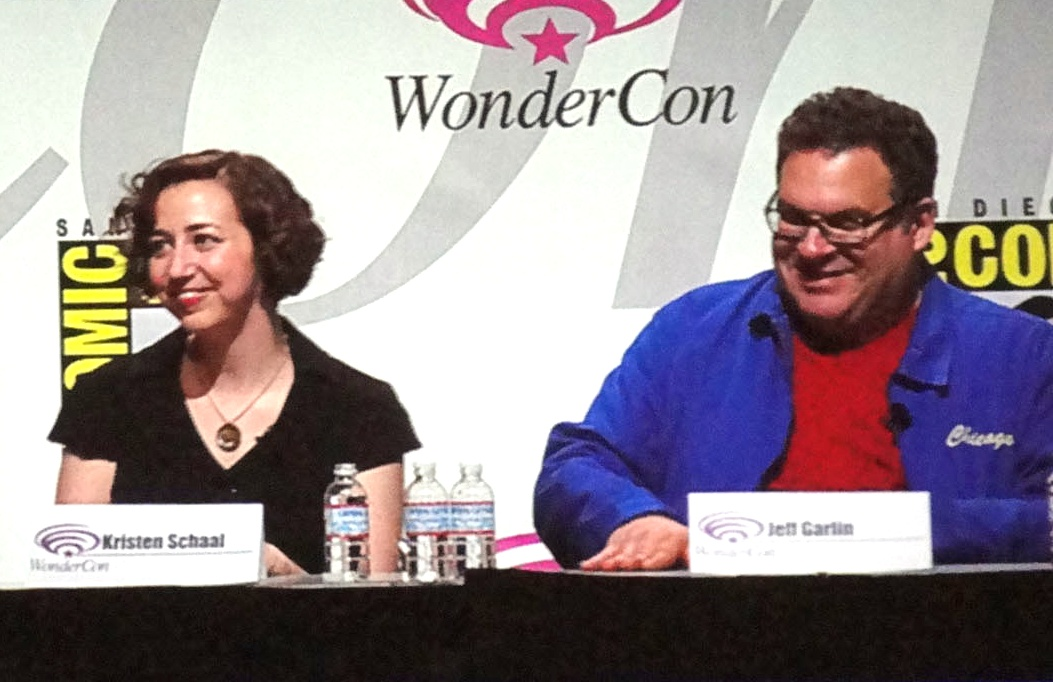
Kristen Schaal and Jeff Garlin, who attended the Toy Story 3 panel at the 2010 WonderCon, joined the cast as Trixie and Buttercup respectively

- Tom Hanks as Woody
- Tim Allen as Buzz Lightyear
  - Javier Fernández Peña voices Buzz in his Spanish mode (credited as Spanish Buzz).
- Joan Cusack as Jessie
- Don Rickles as Mr. Potato Head
- Wallace Shawn as Rex
- John Ratzenberger as Hamm
- Estelle Harris as Mrs. Potato Head
- Ned Beatty as Lots-o'-Huggin' Bear/"Lotso", a strawberry-scented teddy bear.
- Michael Keaton as Ken, a flamboyant Ken doll in league with Lotso.
- Jodi Benson as Barbie, a sensitive but strong-willed Barbie doll who belonged to Andy's sister Molly before being donated.
- John Morris as Andy Davis
  - Charlie Bright voices a young Andy.

In addition to the main cast, Andy's other toys include Jeff Pidgeon as the Aliens, Blake Clark as Slinky Dog (replacing Jim Varney who died in 2000), and R. Lee Ermey as Sarge, in his final role in the franchise before his death in 2018; Laurie Metcalf reprises her role as Andy's mother Mrs. Davis and Bea Miller voices his sister Molly; Emily Hahn and Lori Alan voice Bonnie and her mother; Erik von Detten reprises his role from the first film as Sid Phillips, now a garbage truck driver; Bonnie's toys are voiced by Timothy Dalton as Mr. Pricklepants; Kristen Schaal as Trixie; Bonnie Hunt as Dolly; Jeff Garlin as Buttercup; Charlie Bright, Amber Krone and Brianna Maiwand as the Peas-in-a-Pod; and Bud Luckey as Chuckles. The Sunnyside Daycare toys are voiced by Lee Unkrich as the jack-in-the-box, Teddy Newton as Chatter Telephone, Woody Smith as Big Baby, Whoopi Goldberg as Stretch, John Cygan as Twitch, Jack Angel as Chunk, Jan Rabson as Spark and Richard Kind as the Bookworm.

== Production ==
=== Early development; Circle Seven Animation version ===
Promotional art for Circle Seven's Toy Story 3 at Siggraph 2005, displaying the storyline of the recalled Buzz Lightyears.

According to the terms of Pixar Animation Studios' initial seven-film deal with the Walt Disney Company, all characters created by Pixar for their films were owned and controlled by Disney. Furthermore, Disney owned the rights to make sequels to all Pixar films up to and including Cars, though Pixar retained the right of first refusal to work on these sequels. In 2004, when the contentious negotiations between the two companies made a split appear likely, Michael Eisner, Disney chairman at the time, put plans in motion to produce Toy Story 3 at a new Disney studio, Circle Seven Animation. Tim Allen, the voice of Buzz Lightyear, indicated a willingness to return, even if Pixar was not on board. It was slated for a theatrical release sometime in spring 2008.

Bradley Raymond, who previously directed Disney's direct-to-video sequels such as The Hunchback of Notre Dame II and The Lion King 1½, was hired to direct the film. Among the scripts Circle Seven had under consideration was one from Teacher's Pet screenwriters Bill and Cheri Steinkellner. Their idea for the film involved Andy and his toys (Woody, Buzz, Hamm, Rex, Slinky, Mr. Potato Head, Jessie, and Bullseye) paying a visit to his grandmother's house for the night because his room is getting remodeled. A set of Andy's toys and new characters Hee-Hee and Gladiola try to figure out who is stealing the toys one by one in a whodunit-style murder mystery story. Though it was rejected, Disney was so impressed with the script that this version would have been considered for a possible fourth installment.

The final version of the Circle Seven script was written by Meet the Parents screenwriter Jim Herzfeld. It focused on Andy's toys shipping a malfunctioning Buzz to the factory in Taiwan where he was built called Wocka-Wocka, with the other toys hoping he will be fixed there. While searching on the Internet, they then discovered that many more Buzz Lightyear toys are malfunctioning around the world and the company had issued a massive recall. Fearing Buzz's destruction, a group of Andy's toys (Woody, Rex, Slinky, Mr. Potato Head, Hamm, Jessie, and Bullseye) all ship themselves to Taiwan and venture out to rescue Buzz. At the same time, Buzz meets other toys from around the world that were once loved, but have been recalled such as Rosey, a warm cozy toy, and Jade, a leggy doll with an evening gown. Along with meeting the recalled toys, Buzz also meets a new Star Command action figure that was going to be the replacement of Buzz, Daxx Blastar, along with his accessory pet cat named Comet.

=== New development in 2006 ===
In January 2006, Disney bought Pixar in a deal that put Pixar chiefs Edwin Catmull and John Lasseter in charge of all Disney Animation. Shortly thereafter, Circle Seven Animation was shut down and its alternate version of Toy Story 3 was canceled. The following month, Disney CEO Robert Iger confirmed that Disney was in the process of transferring the production to Pixar. The studio's brain trust, which included John Lasseter, Andrew Stanton, Pete Docter, and Lee Unkrich, had their own idea for a sequel that they had carried around for years. They retreated to the cabin where they first pitched Toy Story, and almost immediately dropped the idea after they felt that it was not good enough. Unable to come up with anything the first day, they watched the first two movies again, and the next day a new story was starting to take shape. Stanton then wrote a treatment.

This story had no traces of the Circle Seven version of the film since the filmmakers did not read its script: "Not out of spite, but we wanted to start fresh, and not be influenced by what they'd done," said Unkrich. In February 2007, Lasseter announced Toy Story 2's co-director, Unkrich, as the sole director of the film instead of himself (Lasseter had directed the first two films and was busy directing Cars 2), and Michael Arndt as screenwriter. 2010 was also announced as the tentative release date.

Unkrich, who had been working with Arndt and story development artists on the film since mid-2006, said that he felt pressure to avoid creating "the first dud" for Pixar, since all of Pixar's prior films had been critical and commercial successes. In February 2008, the film's plotline was reported: "Woody the cowboy and his toy-box friends are dumped in a daycare center after their owner, Andy, leaves for college."

During the initial development stages of the film, Pixar revisited their work from the original Toy Story and found that, although they could open the old computer files for the animated 3D models, error messages prevented them from editing the files, which necessitated recreating the models from scratch. To create the chaotic and complex junkyard scene near the film's end, more than a year and a half was invested on research and development to create the simulation systems required for the sequence.

Instead of sending Tom Hanks, Tim Allen, and John Ratzenberger scripts for their consideration in reprising their roles, a complete story reel of the film was shown to the actors in a theater. The reel was made up of moving storyboards with pre-recorded voices, sound effects, and music. When the preview concluded, the actors signed on to the film. Hanks was paid $15 million for his involvement, the highest salary received for a voice actor.

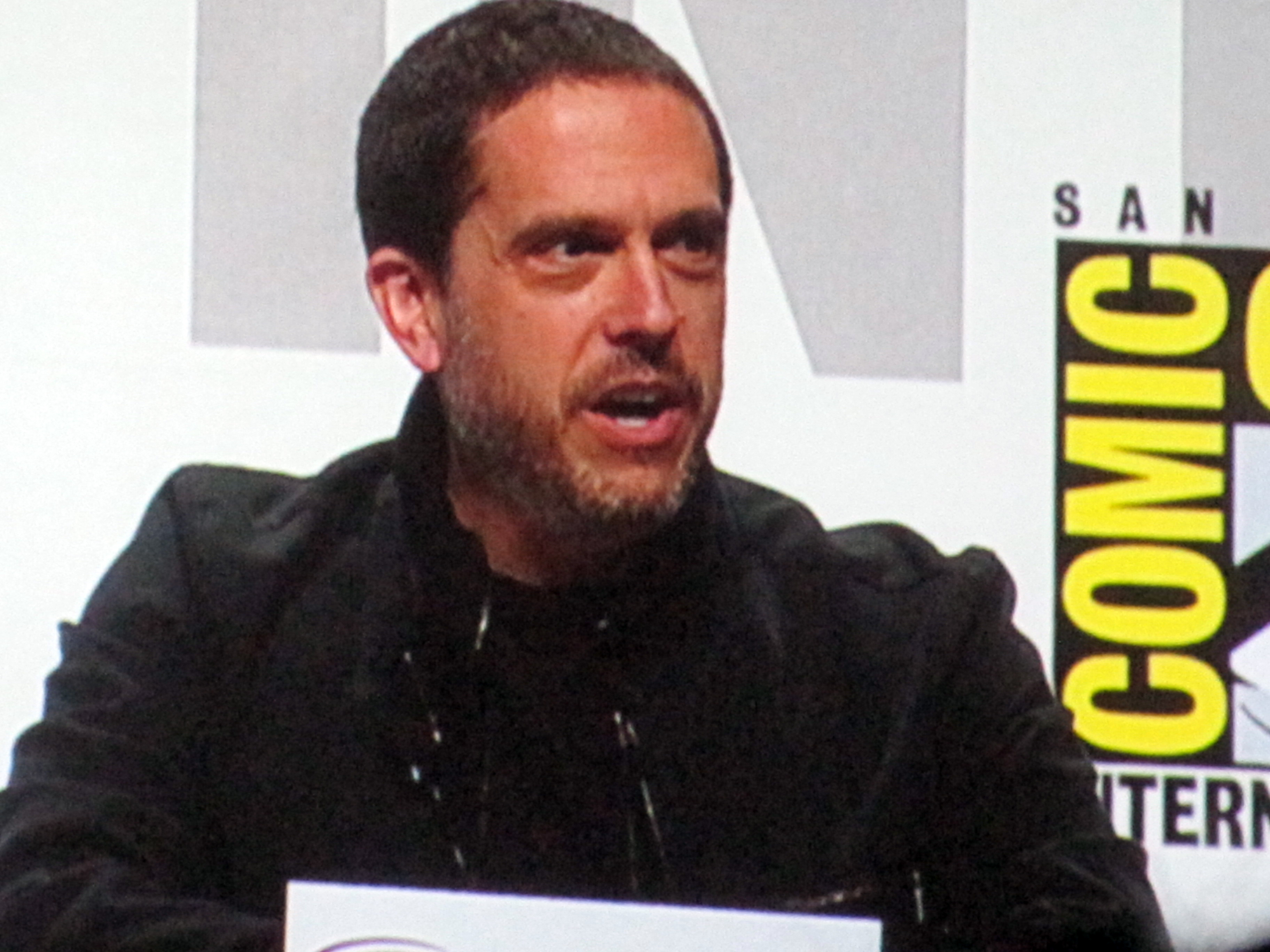
Lee Unkrich, pictured at the Toy Story 3 panel at WonderCon in April 2010, was the full-time director for the film.

In 2007, to create the setting of the film's climax, Pixar artists went on several field trips to a local landfill and incinerator in Northern California. Unkrich explained in an NPR interview: "We visited the Altamont dump and went to a number of other landfills." Although they had visited similar facilities before to create WALL-E, that was a different experience because the landfill environment in that film was not trying to kill the characters. For this film, Pixar was trying to create the toy "equivalent of Dante's Inferno: a grim landscape of suffering and annihilation". The goal was not to "accurately" depict a waste management facility, but "to discover the visual cues" needed to create a facility that was "believable but more dramatic than a real one".

The film's art director, Daisuke Tsutsumi, is married to Hayao Miyazaki's niece, who originally inspired the character Mei in Miyazaki's anime film My Neighbor Totoro (1988). Totoro makes a cameo appearance in Toy Story 3.

Dolby Laboratories announced that Toy Story 3 would be the first film to feature theatrical 7.1 surround sound.

== Marketing ==
The film's first teaser trailer was released with Up in Disney Digital 3-D on May 29, 2009. On October 2, 2009, Toy Story and Toy Story 2 were re-released as a double feature in Disney Digital 3-D. The first full-length trailer was attached as an exclusive sneak peek and a first footage to the Toy Story double feature on October 12, 2009. On March 23, 2010, Toy Story and Toy Story 2 were released separately on Blu-ray/DVD combo packs; Toy Story included a small feature of "The Story of Toy Story 3" and Toy Story 2 included one on the "Characters of Toy Story 3."

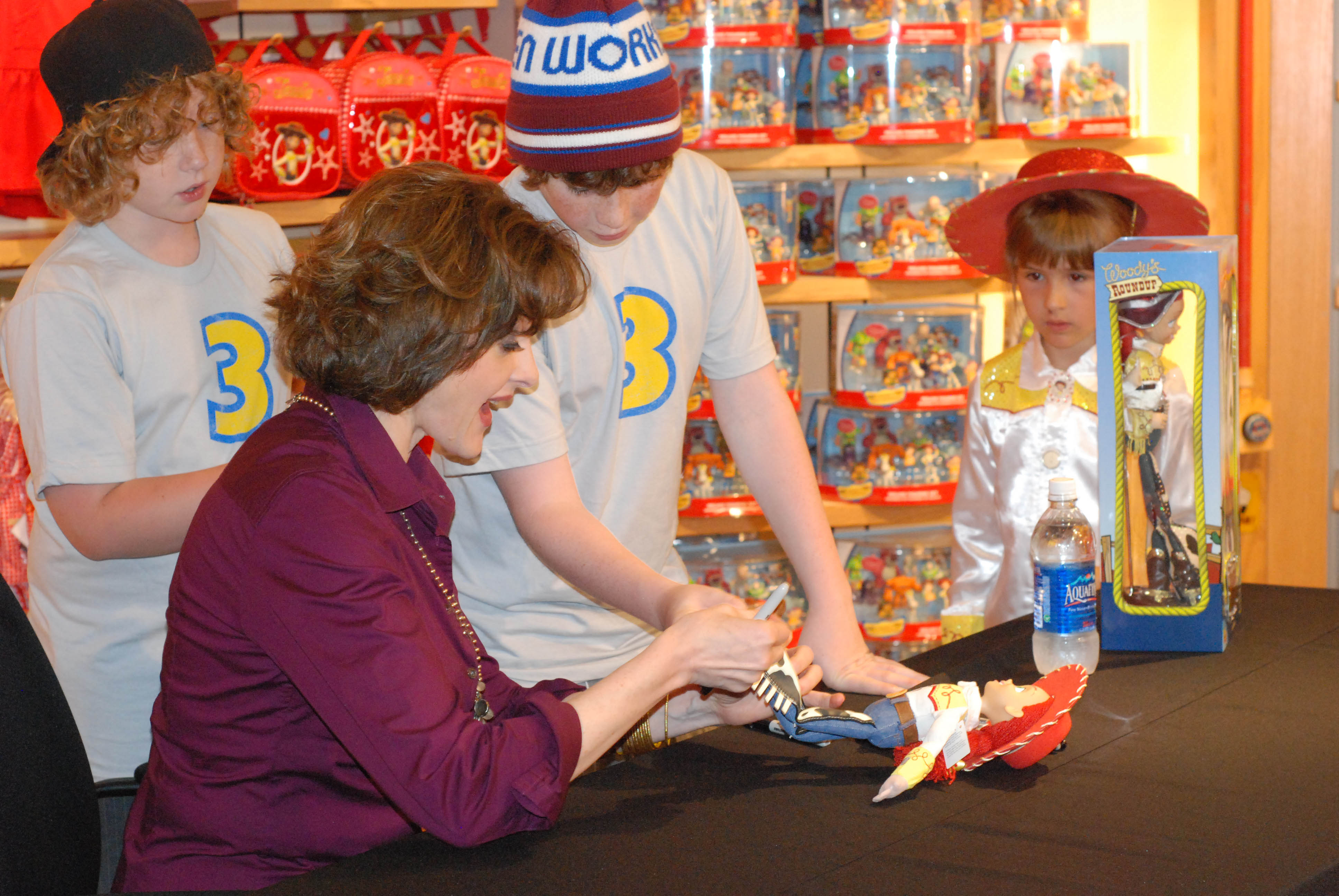
Joan Cusack, who voiced Jessie in the film, signing Toy Story 3 merchandise.

Mattel, Thinkway Toys, and Lego are among companies that produced toys to promote the film. Fisher Price, a Mattel Company, released Toy Story 3 with 21 3D images for viewing with the View-Master viewer. Disney Interactive Studios also produced a video game based on the film Toy Story 3: The Video Game, which was released for Microsoft Windows, Xbox 360, Wii, PlayStation 3, Nintendo DS, and PSP on June 15, 2010. A PlayStation 2 version was released on October 30, 2010, as part of a PS2 bundle and separately on November 2, 2010 (the same day Toy Story 3 was released on DVD and Blu-ray). It was also the last Disney/Pixar game to be released for PlayStation 2.

Toy Story 3 was featured in Apple's iPhone iOS 4 Event on April 8, 2010, with Steve Jobs demonstrating a Toy Story 3-themed iAd written in HTML5. Pixar designed a commercial for the toy Lots-O'-Huggin' Bear and formatted it to appear as if it came from an old VCR recording. The recording was altered with distorted sound, noise along the bottom of the screen, and flickering video, all designed to make it look like a converted recording from around 1983. A Japanese version of the commercial was also released online, with the name "Lots-O'-Huggin Bear" replaced with "Little Hug-Hug Bear".

On Dancing with the Stars' May 11, 2010, episode, the Gipsy Kings performed a Spanish-language version of "You've Got a Friend in Me", which featured a paso doble dance choreographed by Cheryl Burke and Tony Dovolani. Both the song and dance are featured in the film. Toy Story 3 was promoted with airings of the first and second film on several channels in the weeks preceding the film's release, including Disney Channel, Disney XD, and ABC Family. Sneak peeks of Toy Story 3 were also revealed, primarily on Disney Channel.

=== Oscar campaign ===
Toy Story 3's "Not since..." Oscar campaign drew a lot of attention, emphasizing the film's uniqueness and critical acclaim. The campaign consisted of posters featuring characters from the film, comparing Toy Story 3 to previous winners such as The Lord of the Rings: The Return of the King, Shakespeare in Love, Titanic, and more. The Walt Disney Studios Chairman Rich Ross explained they were going for the Best Picture win, not just Best Animated film. The Hollywood Reporter gave the campaign a bronze award in Key Art Awards Winners 2011.

== Release ==
=== Theatrical ===
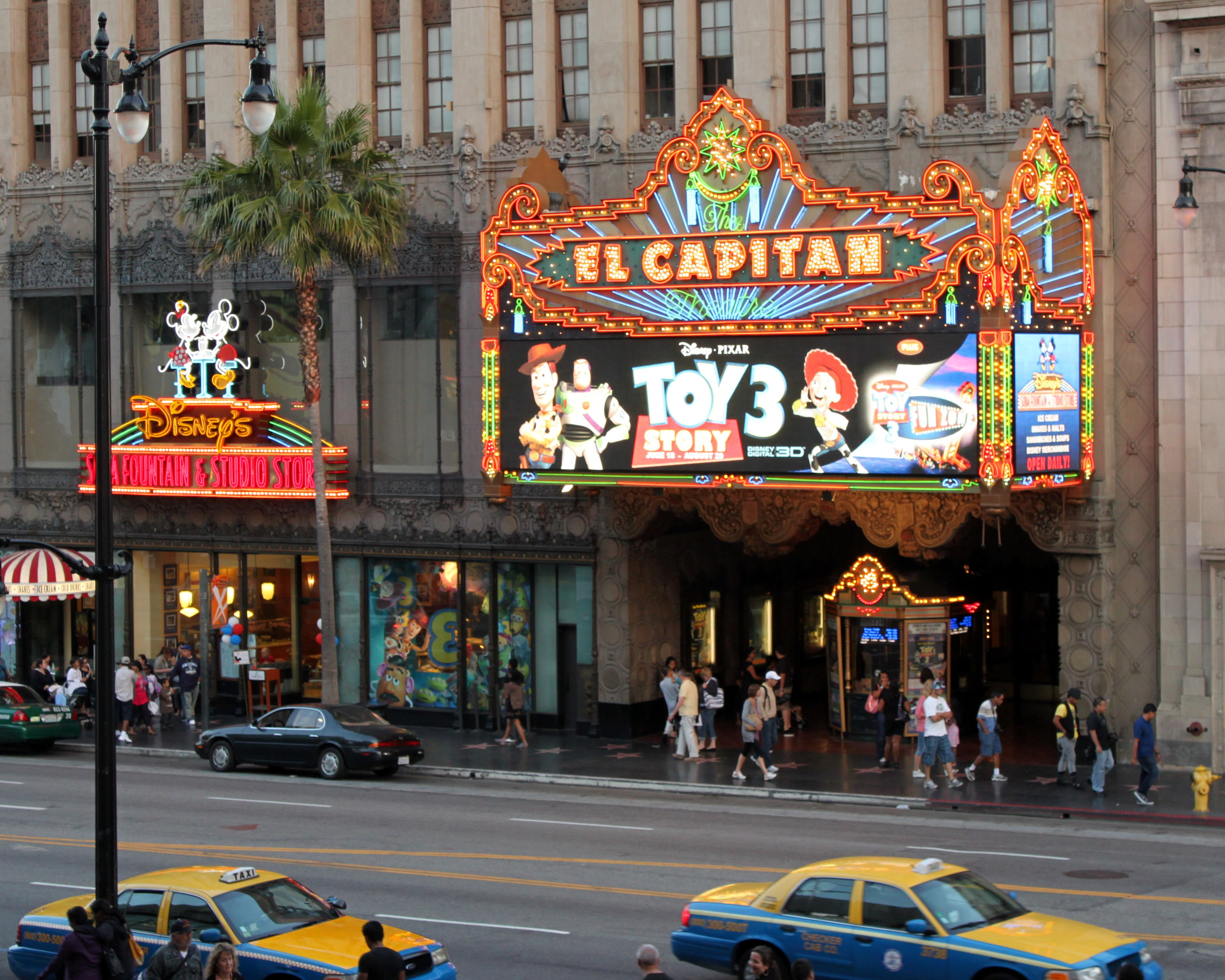
Toy Story 3 had its US premiere at El Capitan Theatre, which also hosted a marathon of all three Toy Story films.

Toy Story 3 had its worldwide premiere on June 12, 2010, opening at Taormina Film Fest in Italy. In the United States, it premiered on June 13, 2010, at El Capitan Theatre in Los Angeles. El Capitan also hosted on June 17, 2010, a Toy Story marathon, showing for the first time all three Toy Story films together. The film went into its wide release on June 18, 2010, along with a release to IMAX 3D theaters.

The film was theatrically accompanied with the Pixar short film Day & Night, which focuses on what happens when an animated personification of Day meets his opposite, Night, and the resulting growth for both.

=== Home media ===
Toy Story 3 was released by Walt Disney Studios Home Entertainment in North America on November 2, 2010, in a standard DVD edition, a two-disc Blu-ray Disc, and in a four-disc Blu-ray/DVD/Digital Copy combo pack. Features included behind-the-scenes, including a sneak peek teaser for the then-upcoming Cars 2 (the sequel to the 2006 film Cars). A 10-disc Toy Story trilogy Blu-ray box set arrived on store shelves that same day. A 3D version of the Blu-ray was released in North America on November 1, 2011.

On its first week of release (November 2–7, 2010), it sold 3,859,736 units (equal to $73,096,452), ranking No.1 for the week and immediately becoming the bestselling animated film of 2010 in units sold (surpassing How to Train Your Dragon). As of July 18, 2012, it had sold 10,911,701 units ($185,924,247). It became the bestselling DVD of 2010 in units sold, but it lacked in sales revenue and therefore ranked second behind Avatar on that list. It also sold about 4 million Blu-ray units, ranking as the fourth-bestselling film of 2010.

In the United Kingdom, it broke the record for the largest first day ever for an animated feature in sales revenue, on both DVD and Blu-ray. Additionally, on the first day of its iTunes release, it immediately became the most downloaded Disney film ever. Toy Story 3 was released on 4K UHD Blu-ray on June 4, 2019.

== Reception ==
=== Box office ===
Toy Story 3 earned $415 million in the United States and Canada and $652 million in other countries for a worldwide total of $1.067 billion, becoming the highest-grossing animated film of all time (until it was surpassed by Frozen (2013) in 2014) and the highest-grossing film of 2010. On its first weekend, Toy Story 3 topped the worldwide box office with $145.3 million ($153.7 million with weekday previews), the ninth-largest opening weekend worldwide for an animated feature. On August 27, 2010 – its seventy-first day of release, it surpassed the $1 billion mark, becoming the third Disney film, the second Disney-distributed film in 2010 (after Alice in Wonderland), the first animated film, and the seventh film in cinematic history to do so.

==== United States and Canada ====
In North America, Box Office Mojo estimates that the film sold over 52 million tickets in the U.S. Toy Story 3 earned $41.1 million on its opening day (June 18, 2010) from 4,028 theaters, including $4 million at midnight shows from about 1,500 theaters, setting an opening-day record for an animated film (surpassed by Minions and later Finding Dory).

During its opening weekend, the film topped the box office with $110.3 million, setting an opening-weekend record among Pixar films (surpassed by Finding Dory), films released in June (surpassed by Man of Steel and later Jurassic World), and G-rated films (surpassed by its sequel). The film also achieved the second-largest opening weekend among animated films and the fourth-largest opening weekend among 2010 films. Its average of $27,385 per venue is the second-highest for a G-rated film and the third-highest for an animated feature. Its opening-week gross (Friday through Thursday) of $167.6 million is the second-largest among animated films, the second-largest among 2010 films, and the 23rd-largest of all time. It also achieved the largest 10-day gross among 2010 films. It topped the box office for two consecutive weekends.

==== Other territories ====
Outside of North America, Toy Story 3 topped the box office outside North America three times, in its first ($35 million), second, and sixth weekend (which was its largest). Its highest-grossing market after North America is Japan ($126.7 million), where it is the second-highest-grossing U.S. animated feature (behind Finding Nemo), followed by the UK and Ireland, and Malta (£73.8 million – $116.6 million), where it is the ninth-highest-grossing film, and Mexico ($59.4 million), where it is the second-highest-grossing film. It set opening-weekend records for animated films in Ecuador, Colombia, Mexico, China, Argentina, Hong Kong, Spain, and the UK. Its top international markets were the United Kingdom ($115.4 million), Australia ($32.8 million), and Brazil ($23.6 million).

=== Critical response ===
Toy Story 3 received near-unanimous praise from film critics upon release. On review aggregation website Rotten Tomatoes, Toy Story 3 has an approval rating of 98% based on 313 reviews, with an average rating of 9.1/10. The site's critical consensus reads, "Deftly blending comedy, adventure, and honest emotion, Toy Story 3 is a rare second sequel that really works." Metacritic, another review aggregator which assigns a normalized rating to reviews, gave the film a score of 92 out of 100 based on 39 critics, indicating "universal acclaim". Time magazine named Toy Story 3 the "best film of 2010". In 2011, Time ranked the film at #11 on their list of "The 25 All-TIME Best Animated Films". Audiences polled by CinemaScore gave the film an average grade of "A" on an A+ to F scale, the same score as the first film, but down from the "A+" earned by the second film.

A. O. Scott of The New York Times stated "This film—this whole three-part, 15-year epic—about the adventures of a bunch of silly plastic junk turns out also to be a long, melancholy meditation on loss, impermanence and that noble, stubborn, foolish thing called love." Owen Gleiberman from Entertainment Weekly gave the film an "A" saying "Even with the bar raised high, Toy Story 3 enchanted and moved me so deeply I was flabbergasted that a digitally animated comedy about plastic playthings could have this effect." Gleiberman also wrote in the next issue that he, along with many other grown men, cried at the end of the film. Michael Rechtshaffen of The Hollywood Reporter also gave the film a positive review, saying "Woody, Buzz and playmates make a thoroughly engaging, emotionally satisfying return." Richard Corliss of Time wrote, "An Instant Classic!"

Mark Kermode of the BBC gave the film, and the series, a glowing review, calling it "the best movie trilogy of all time." In USA Today, Claudia Puig gave the film a complete 4-star rating, writing "This installment, the best of the three, is everything a movie should be: hilarious, touching, exciting, and clever." Michael Phillips of the Chicago Tribune gave the film 3 out of 4 stars, writing that "Compared with the riches of all kinds in recent Pixar masterworks such as Ratatouille, WALL-E, and Up, Toy Story 3 looks and plays like an exceptionally slick and confident product, as opposed to a magical blend of commerce and popular art." Roger Moore of the Orlando Sentinel, who gave the film 3 1/2 out of 4 stars, wrote "Dazzling, scary, and sentimental, Toy Story 3 is a dark and emotional conclusion to the film series that made Pixar famous."

Toy Story 3 was one of the best-reviewed films of 2010. Rotten Tomatoes ranked it the best-reviewed film of the year, while Metacritic placed it second, behind The Social Network (2010). Film critic Armond White was widely criticized for giving one of the few negative reviews, which has been noted as preventing the film from maintaining a perfect score on Rotten Tomatoes.

Cahiers du Cinéma put it at the fourth place of its top ten best 2010 films. In 2018, IndieWire writers ranked the script the tenth best American screenplay of the 21st century.

=== Accolades ===
At the 83rd Academy Awards, Toy Story 3 received nominations for Best Picture, Best Adapted Screenplay, and Best Sound Editing; and won Best Animated Feature and Best Original Song. Its other nominations include three Annie Awards, three British Academy Film Awards (winning one), five Critics' Choice Movie Awards (winning one), and a Golden Globe Award (which it won). The National Board of Review and the American Film Institute named Toy Story 3 one of the ten-best films of 2010; it also won the National Board of Review's Best Animated Film award. In December 2021, the film's screenplay was listed number forty-four on the Writers Guild of America's "101 Greatest Screenplays of the 21st Century (So Far)". In 2025, it was one of the films voted for the "Readers' Choice" edition of The New York Times' list of "The 100 Best Movies of the 21st Century," finishing at number 138.

=== Fan project ===
External videos
- Toy Story 3 IRL

Iowa brothers Morgan and Mason McGrew spent eight years recreating the film in stop motion. Titled Toy Story 3 in Real Life, the film was shot using iPhones and was uploaded to YouTube on January 25, 2020. Excluding the scenes with human characters, the shot-for-shot remake uses the film's original audio. According to Screen Crush, Pixar's parent company Walt Disney Studios gave the McGrews permission to release the film online.

== Music ==
The film score for Toy Story 3 was composed and conducted by Randy Newman, his sixth for Pixar after Toy Story, A Bug's Life, Toy Story 2, Monsters, Inc., and Cars. Initially, Disney released the soundtrack only as digital download. This was the second instance where Disney did not release the award-winning soundtrack of a Pixar film on CD, the first being Up. In January 2012, Intrada released the Toy Story 3 soundtrack on CD.

In addition to the tracks included in the soundtrack album, the film also uses several other tracks such as "Dream Weaver" by Gary Wright, "Le Freak" by Chic, and Randy Newman's original version of "You've Got a Friend in Me". Furthermore, tracks "Cowboy!" and "Come to Papa" included material from Newman's rejected score to Air Force One. The song "Losing You" from Newman's own album Harps and Angels was also used in the first trailer for the film. The Judas Priest song "Electric Eye" was also used in the film in the temp score for the opening scene of the film.

== Sequels ==
Toy Story 3 was followed by Toy Story 4 (2019). It marginally surpassed the box-office take of Toy Story 3, and received a similarly positive critical and audience response. A fifth film, Toy Story 5, was released on June 19, 2026, to similar reception as the previous two films.
