= But Daddy I Love Him =

2024 song by Taylor Swift

Song by Taylor Swift

from the album The Tortured Poets Department
- Released: April 19, 2024
- Studio: Conway Recording (Los Angeles); Electric Lady (New York)
- Genre: Country; country pop; electronica; folk rock
- Length: 5:40
- Label: Republic
- Songwriters: Taylor Swift; Aaron Dessner
- Producers: Taylor Swift; Aaron Dessner; Jack Antonoff

Lyric video
- "But Daddy I Love Him" on YouTube

"But Daddy I Love Him" is a song by the American singer-songwriter Taylor Swift from her eleventh studio album, The Tortured Poets Department (2024). Swift and Aaron Dessner wrote the track, and they produced it with Jack Antonoff. A fingerpicked guitar-led ballad, "But Daddy I Love Him" consists of a string arrangement and live drums. The song employs a country songwriting style, and its narrative lyrics are about a scrutinized romantic relationship: Swift's narrator is a girl brought up in a religious small town, and she affirms her real love for a troublesome man, confronting critics of her affair and telling them that she is the only authority of her life. Critics categorized the song's genre as country pop, electronica, and folk rock.

Reviews of "But Daddy I Love Him" considered the lyrics autobiographical and analyzed them with references to Swift's fame and personal life. Critics generally acclaimed the narrative as dramatic and intense but also humorous, and the production as catchy and anthemic. Some reviews picked the track among the best songs of 2024. "But Daddy I Love Him" peaked at number seven on the Billboard Global 200 and within the top 10 on charts in Australia, Canada, New Zealand, Singapore, and the United States. It has received certifications in Australia, New Zealand, and the United Kingdom. Swift included the song in the Eras Tour's revamped set list in 2024.

== Background and release ==
Taylor Swift developed her eleventh studio album, The Tortured Poets Department, "for about two years" after finishing her previous album, Midnights (2022). She reflected on The Tortured Poets Department as a "lifeline" for her, and its conception took place amidst intense media reports on Swift's personal life, including a breakup after a long-term relationship with Joe Alwyn and a brief romantic linking with Matty Healy. The Tortured Poets Department was released on April 19, 2024, via Republic Records. "But Daddy I Love Him" is track six on the album's standard edition. An acoustic version of the song is included on the physical edition of The Tortured Poets Department: The Anthology.

Swift included "But Daddy I Love Him" in the revamped set list of her sixth headlining concert tour, the Eras Tour, beginning in May 2024 at the Paris shows. It is the first track during the Tortured Poets Department segment of the concerts. Swift performed the song dressed in a white corset dress adorned with cursive writings and a Vivienne Westwood choker necklace.

== Production and music ==
Swift wrote "But Daddy I Love Him" with Aaron Dessner, and the two produced the track with Jack Antonoff. On the track, Dessner played acoustic guitar, and Antonoff programmed it, provided background vocals, and played various instruments: cello, bass guitar, acoustic guitar, electric guitar, the Juno, and the Mellotron. Sean Hutchinson played drums; Bobby Hawk played strings; and Zem Audu, Mikey Freedom Hart, and Evan Smith played synthesizers. "But Daddy I Love Him" was recorded by Laura Sisk and Oli Jacobs at Conway Recording Studios, Los Angeles, and Electric Lady Studios, New York. The track was mixed by Serban Ghenea at MixStar Studios, Virginia Beach.

"But Daddy I Love Him"
"But Daddy I Love Him" is a folk rock and electronica ballad with rock and country elements, featuring dynamic shifts in the chorus.

"But Daddy I Love Him" is a ballad that lasts for 5 minutes and 40 seconds. Its verses are instrumented by a string arrangement composed of fingerpicked guitars and subtle accents of fiddles, displaying elements of country and rock. The refrain is dynamic, described by Billboard's Jason Lipshutz as "large, open-hearted" that evoked Swift's early country pop songs. Several critics opined that the song's production aligned with the musical styles Swift's past albums Fearless (2008) and Speak Now (2010). The genre was described by critics as country, electronica, country pop, and folk rock.

== Lyrics and interpretations ==
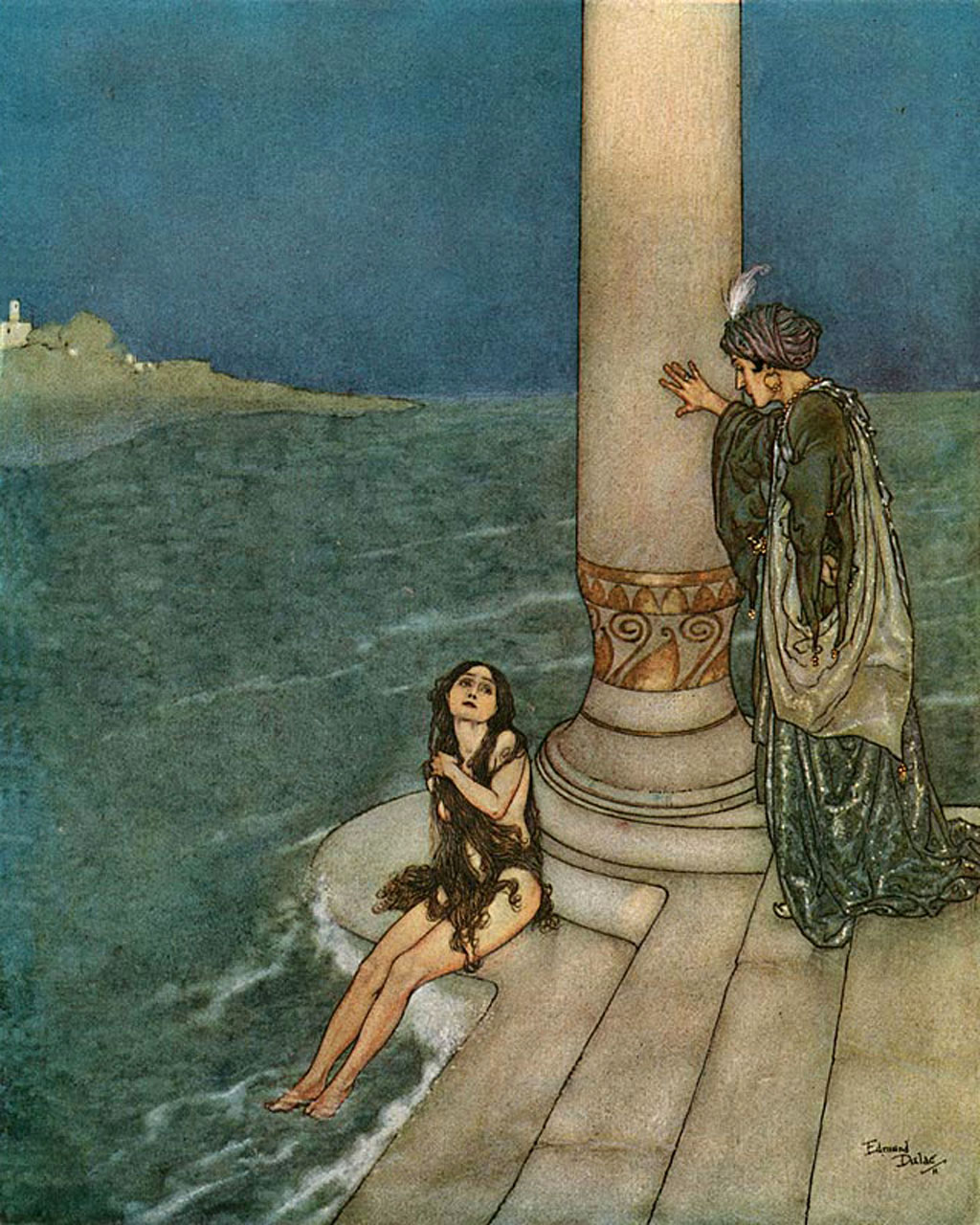
The title evokes a quote from the 1989 Disney animated film The Little Mermaid (pictured is an illustration of the original story The Little Mermaid).

Employing a country songwriting style, the lyrics of "But Daddy I Love Him" see Swift's narrator confronting critics of her love life. The title is a quote from the 1989 Disney animated film The Little Mermaid; the protagonist Ariel says the line in response to her merman father's disapproval of her human love interest, Prince Eric. The overall narrative revolves around a romantic affair that became a widely debated topic among residents of a religious small town. In the opening verse, Swift's narrator establishes her tension with her critics: "I just learned these people only raise you just to cage you", and her resentment against them for disapproving of her romantic life: "Sarahs and Hannahs in their Sunday best" / "Clutching their pearls, sighing, 'What a mess'".

Throughout the track, Swift's narrator affirms that her love is real and that her lover is "the one I want" despite his seemingly troublesome qualities, but they were also part of the reasons she is attracted to him: "He was chaos, he was revelry" / "Me and my wild boy, and all this wild joy." In the bridge, she directly confronts her critics—the "Sarahs and Hannahs", the "wine moms", and "the elders"—that only she has the authority to "disgrace" her good-girl reputation: "I'd rather burn my whole life down/ Than listen to one more second of all this bitching and moaning." She continues by affirming to them that their judgement would not dissuade her from pursuing this romance: "God save the most judgmental creeps/ Who say they want what's best for me/ Sanctimoniously performing soliloquies I'll never see." Towards the track's conclusion, this romance receives approval from the father of Swift's narrator, and she tells her critics that they are not welcomed at her wedding.

Several journalists interpreted "But Daddy I Love Him" as an autobiographical song about the scrutiny Swift received for her dating history, specifically the short-lived linking with Healy. According to Kitty Empire of The Observer, despite its autobiographical elements, the narrative is more akin to an allegorical short story with a Bruce Springsteen–styled "mini-epic" story line. Some critics drew parallels between "But Daddy I Love Him" and Swift's 2008 single "Love Story", a track about a teenage romance suffering from parental disapproval; both songs end with the romance receiving approval from the father of the female protagonist. For Rob Sheffield of Rolling Stone, whereas "Love Story" is based on the Shakespearean story Romeo and Juliet, "But Daddy I Love Him" contains references to Hamlet. Bryan West from The Tennessean thought that the romantic freedom and defiant attitude of "But Daddy I Love Him" were reminiscent of the sentiments in Swift's 2017 track "Don't Blame Me".

The lyric, "I'm having his baby/ No I'm not, but you should see your face", was singled out in reviews as a humorous part where Swift breaks the fourth wall to directly communicate with the song's listeners and her fans; several speculated that it expressed her anger at fans due to their public outcry against her and Healy's linking. Some critics, like Vulture's Craig Jenkins and Billboard Philippines' Gabriel Saulog, saw "But Daddy I Love Him" as Swift's message of asserting her authority over her personal life, despite the intense attention she received from her fans and the press. In The Guardian, Laura Snapes identified potential references to how Swift's management and family also disapproved of her romantic choices and upheld that the track's crux was "the sentiment about who gets to decide what's right for [Swift]". For Jenkins, the song sees Swift wrestling with her own image as a "dutiful daughter" of Americana, serving as "an examination of faith-based striations within white society".

== Critical reception ==
A multitude of critics picked "But Daddy I Love Him" as a standout from The Tortured Poets Department, with some deeming it the album's best. Many reviews focused on its lyricism; they found it fascinating that Swift expressed her anger towards the press, the public, and even her fans to defend her personal life choices. Lindsay Zoladz of The New York Times considered the track "unexpectedly venomous", and Ann Powers of NPR wrote that the unhinged behaviors depicted in the track showed that not even Swift's fans were "spared in her dissection of just who's made her miserable over the past few years". Ranking the track the second-best on the album (behind "The Smallest Man Who Ever Lived"), Jason Lipshutz of Billboard regarded it as the album's centerpiece. The Guardian's Alexis Petridis thought that Swift "pulls it off" with the risk of offending her fan base in the song, finding her expression of "fatigued exasperation" both believable and affecting.

Several reviewers were impressed with the dramatic lyricism and pointed out the country songwriting roots in Swift's artistry. Business Insider's Callie Ahlgrim applauded the Shakespearean influences that elevated the emotional sentiments, and Exclaim!'s Alex Hudson found it uplifting that the track did not rely on "self-seriousness" and dared to be ridiculous and humorous. Mikael Wood from the Los Angeles Times highlighted the melodramatic tendencies that made the track thrilling to listen to. In a review for Pitchfork, Olivia Horn wrote that "But Daddy I Love Him" was one of the album tracks that contained an "unruliness" with lengthy narrative details. Contrary to the tracks that strayed into verbosity, "But Daddy I Love Him" succeeded thanks to Swift's "nimble" and "heel-turning" details that stacked up towards "flights of fantasy unlike anything else on this album".

Other reviews also praised the production. The Guardian's Laura Snapes believed the song deserved to be sung along to in stadiums. The Atlantic's Spencer Kornhaber highlighted the country and rock influences, the live-sounding drums, and Swift's "keening" voice, finding the musical combination "perfect". Will Hodgkinson from The Times dubbed it an "upbeat pop banger" that evoked Swift's earlier hits like "Blank Space" (2014) or "We Are Never Ever Getting Back Together" (2012). Paste lauded the country inflictions and the "awe-striking, stand-still melodies". Variety's Chris Willman described it as a surprisingly "organic"-sounding song produced by Antonoff and Dessner for Swift; he placed it 17th in his list of the 75 best songs by Swift, saying that while it sonically built on her past eras, it also showcased a bold aspect of her to assert her authority over her personal life.

NME ranked it at number 30 among their 50 best songs of 2024. It appeared at number 10 on the Los Angeles Times' list of the 30 best songs of 2024. Our Culture Mag's Konstantinos Pappis included "But Daddy I Love Him" in his list of the 25 best songs of the year, praising the dynamic production and the lyrics for showcasing Swift's self-awareness, humor, and anger.

== Commercial performance ==
Following the album's release, its tracks occupied the top nine of the Billboard Global 200; "But Daddy I Love Him" debuted at its peak of number seven on the chart, where it extended Swift's top-10 entries to 33. In the United States, the song opened and peaked at number seven on the Billboard Hot 100. It along with 13 tracks from the album made Swift the first artist to monopolize the top 14 of the Hot 100. In Australia, "But Daddy I Love Him" reached number seven on the ARIA Singles Chart and made her the artist with the most entries in a single week with 29.

Elsewhere, "But Daddy I Love Him" reached the top 10 in Canada, New Zealand, and Singapore, with peaks of number seven, eight, and number nine, respectively. The song also charted within the top 25 in the Philippines (11), Malaysia (18), Portugal (20), Denmark (23), and Billboard's Hits of the World charts for Ireland (12), Luxembourg (19), South Africa (23), and Belgium (24).

== Personnel ==
Credits are adapted from the liner notes of The Tortured Poets Department.

- Taylor Swift – vocals, songwriter, producer
- Jack Antonoff – producer, programming, cello, Juno, bass, electric guitar, acoustic guitar, background vocals, Mellotron
- Aaron Dessner – producer, songwriter, acoustic guitar
- Serban Ghenea – mixing
- Bryce Bordone – mix engineer
- Laura Sisk – recording engineer
- Oli Jacobs – recording engineer
- Jon Sher – assistant recording engineer
- Jack Manning – assistant recording engineer
- Sean Hutchinson – drums
- Michael Riddleberger – recording engineer
- Mikey Freedom Hart – synthesizer
- David Hart – recording engineer
- Evan Smith – synthesizer
- Zem Audu – synthesizer
- Jonathan Low – recording engineer
- Bella Blasko – recording engineer
- Bobby Hawk – strings
- Randy Merrill – mastering

== Charts ==
Chart performance
Chart (2024)	Peak position
Argentina Hot 100 (Billboard)	80
Australia (ARIA)	7
Brazil Hot 100 (Billboard)	66
Canada Hot 100 (Billboard)	7
Czech Republic Singles Digital (ČNS IFPI)	48
Denmark (Tracklisten)	23
France (SNEP)	79
Global 200 (Billboard)	7
Greece International (IFPI)	18
India (IMI)	18
Lithuania (AGATA)	56
Luxembourg (Billboard)	19
Malaysia International (RIM)	16
New Zealand (Recorded Music NZ)	8
Norway (VG-lista)	35
Philippines (Billboard)	11
Poland (Polish Streaming Top 100)	80
Portugal (AFP)	20
Singapore (RIAS)	9
Slovakia Singles Digital (ČNS IFPI)	49
South Africa (Billboard)	23
South Korea Download (Circle)	167
Spain (Promusicae)	61
Sweden (Sverigetopplistan)	29
Swiss Streaming (Schweizer Hitparade)	18
UAE (IFPI)	14
UK Singles Downloads (Official Charts)	71
UK Streaming (OCC)	11
US Billboard Hot 100	7

== Certifications ==
Certifications for "But Daddy I Love Him"
Region	Certification	Certified units/sales
Australia (ARIA)	Platinum	70,000^{‡}
Brazil (Pro-Música Brasil)	2× Platinum	80,000^{‡}
New Zealand (RMNZ)	Gold	15,000^{‡}
United Kingdom (BPI)	Gold	400,000^{‡}
^{‡} Sales+streaming figures based on certification alone.
