= Medill School of Journalism =

Journalism school of Northwestern University

Coordinates: 42°3′2.8″N 87°40′27.1″W

Northwestern University Medill School of Journalism, Media, Integrated Marketing Communications
- Established: 1921
- Parent institution: Northwestern University
- Dean: Charles Whitaker
- Faculty: 55
- Undergraduates: 684
- Postgraduates: 342
- Location: Cook County, Illinois, United States
- Website: medill.northwestern.edu

The Medill School of Journalism, Media, Integrated Marketing Communications (branded as Northwestern Medill) is the journalism school of Northwestern University. It offers undergraduate and graduate degree programs. Founded in 1921, it is named for publisher and editor Joseph Medill.

== History ==
The Medill School of Journalism was founded in 1921, and named after Joseph Medill (1823–1899), former owner and editor of the Chicago Tribune, which was then run by his grandsons Robert R. McCormick and Joseph Medill Patterson.

In February 2011, Medill received a grant from the Knight Foundation to establish the Knight News Innovation Laboratory. The lab is a joint initiative of Medill and the McCormick School of Engineering at Northwestern. It combines the disciplines of journalism and computer science together.

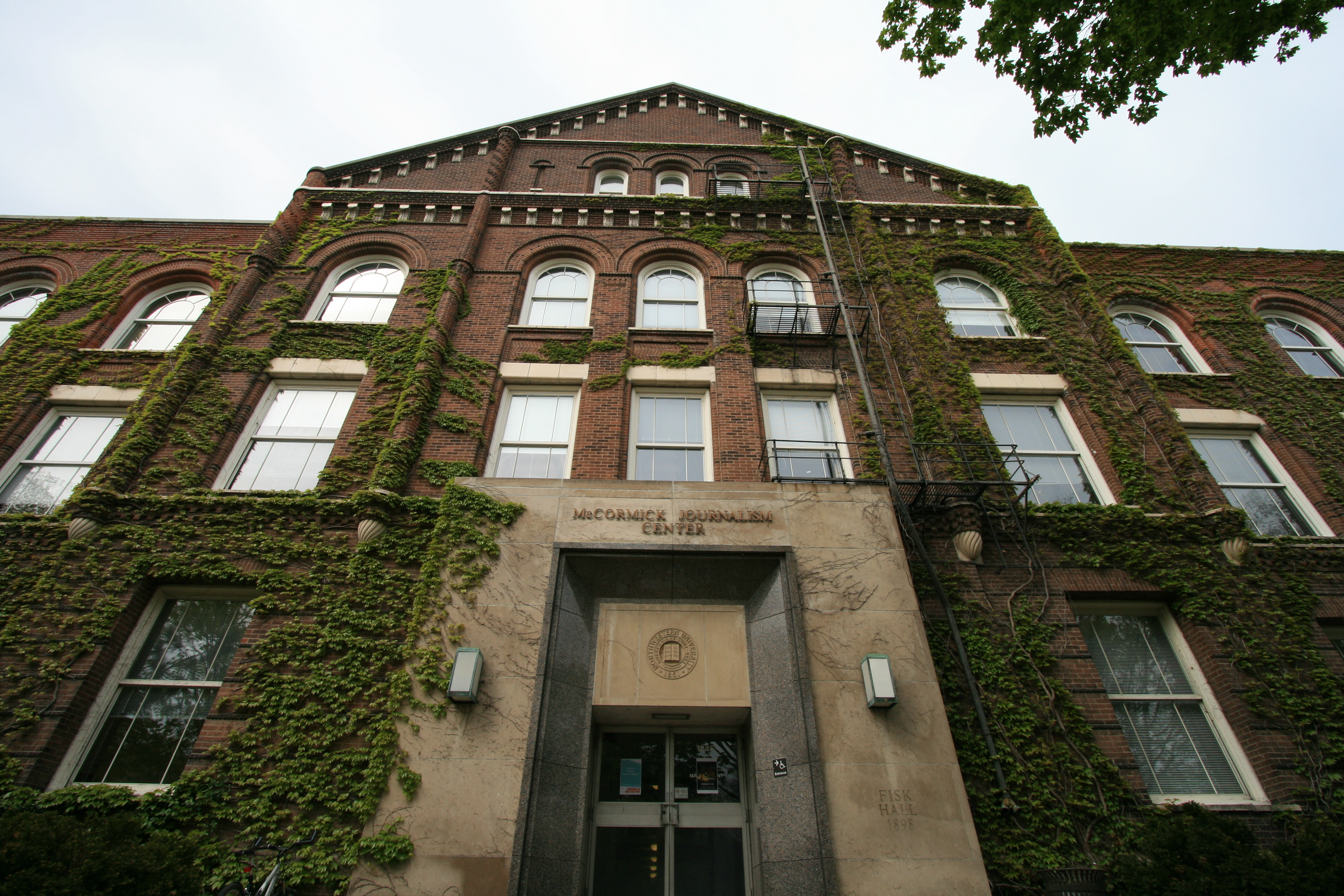
Medill, Fisk Hall at Northwestern

On March 11, 2011, the Board of Trustees of Northwestern University approved the name change of the Medill School of Journalism to an expanded version, the "Medill School of Journalism, Media, Integrated Marketing Communications".

== Controversies ==
=== 2008 Quotegate ===
In a February 11, 2008 column written for the Daily Northwestern, Medill senior David Spett questioned the use of anonymous sources by Dean John Lavine in a letter Lavine wrote for Medill's alumni magazine. Lavine attributed a quote praising a Medill marketing class to "a Medill junior" in the class. Spett reportedly called all 29 students enrolled in the class, including all five Medill juniors, and according to Spett, all denied saying the quote. Lavine denied fabricating the quote in a February 20 email to students, but expressed regret for what he called "poor judgment" in not keeping his notes.

The so-called "Quotegate" controversy was the focus of stories, columns and editorials in local and national media, including the Chicago Tribune, the Chicago Sun-Times, The Washington Post and Editor & Publisher.

=== Medill Justice Project ===
The Medill Justice Project, originally known as the Medill Innocence Project, began in 1999, as an effort by Medill faculty and students to reinvestigate murder convictions in Illinois and determine if people were wrongly convicted. This effort has helped to free 11 men, including Anthony Porter and the Ford Heights Four. Medill Justice Project work is credited with prompting Illinois Governor George Ryan to suspend the death penalty and commute all death sentences in 2003.

In 1999, the project successfully worked to free Anthony Porter, who had been convicted of killing two people. Alstory Simon made a video confession to the crimes, encouraged by the Medill Justice Project and a private investigator. Simon pleaded guilty and was eventually sentenced to 37 years. However, in 2014, authorities exonerated Simon and freed him from prison. Anita Alvarez, of the Cook County State's Attorney's Office, criticized David Protess, the Innocence Project founder and director, and long-time Medill journalism professor. Prosecutors said Protess, private investigator Paul Ciolino, and Medill students manipulated Simon into making the confession. The Innocence Project allegedly told Simon he could be executed, said he could earn money from book deals if he cooperated, and falsely claimed there was a witness who implicated Simon. The Medill Innocence Project has been accused of framing Alstory Simon for the murders. In 2015, Simon sued Northwestern for $40 million; the case was settled in 2018 for an undisclosed amount.

From 2009 to 2011, the project was involved in a dispute with the Cook County, Illinois state's attorney over the handling of the Anthony McKinney case. The university claimed reporter's privilege in resisting a subpoena for Justice Project records of the case, while the state claimed the project had been acting as investigators in behalf of McKinney's counsel. Medill faculty member David Protess was suspended during this dispute. In 2011, Protess left to found the Chicago Innocence Project and blog for the Huffington Post while the school gave up the records.

In February 2018, Medill Justice Project Director Alec Klein was accused of bullying and sexual harassment by multiple former students and employees. Klein "categorically" denied the allegations and took a leave of absence during the university's investigation. Klein resigned from his position and left the university in August.

== Alumni ==
Medill alumni have won:

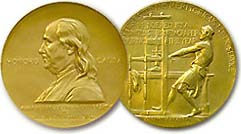
Pulitzer Prize, U.S. award for achievements in newspaper and online journalism, literature and musical composition

- 40 Pulitzer Awards
- 6 American Business Media Jesse H. Neal Awards
- 71 National Academy of Television Arts and Sciences Emmy Awards (NATAS)
- 5 Public Relations Society of America Anvil Awards
- 9 University of Georgia George Foster Peabody Awards
- 11 American Society of Magazine Editors' National Magazine Awards
- 2 International Association of Business Communicators Gold Quill Awards
- 7 Columbia University Alfred I. duPont Awards
- 1 Academy (Oscar) Award

=== Notable alumni ===
The school recognizes alumni "whose distinctive careers have had positive impacts on their fields" with its Hall of Achievement award, as well as alumni who have been awarded a Pulitzer Prize.

- J. A. Adande, ESPN personality and former Los Angeles Times columnist
- Steve Albini, Musician, record producer and audio engineer. Most famous for playing guitar in Big Black and producing Nirvana's third album In Utero.
- Peter Applebome (M.S.J. 1974), reporter at The New York Times
- Jabari Asim, columnist, The Washington Post
- Gillian Flynn, author, (Gone Girl)
- David Barstow, Pulitzer Prize-winning investigative reporter for The New York Times
- Sy Bartlett, author and Hollywood screenwriter
- Steve Bell (M.S.J. 1963), former correspondent for ABC News
- Naftali Bendavid, Congress reporter for The Wall Street Journal
- Guy Benson (B.J. 2007), conservative writer, author, political commentator, and talk radio host.
- Ira Berkow (M.S.J. 1964), Pulitzer Prize nominated (1988) and winning (2001) sports reporter, columnist and features writer, The New York Times
- Ari Berman, writer for The Nation and author of Herding Donkeys
- Kai Bird (M.S.J. 1975), Pulitzer Prize-winning author and columnist
- Kevin Blackistone (B.S.J. 1981), ESPN contributor, Around the Horn; The Dallas Morning News sports columnist
- Valerie Boyd (B.S.J. 1985), author of Wrapped in Rainbows: The Life of Zora Neale Hurston; former Atlanta Journal-Constitution arts editor
- Christine Brennan (B.S.J. 1980, M.S. 1981), sports columnist, USA Today
- Hal Buell, former head of photography service at the Associated Press
- Elisabeth Bumiller, The New York Times reporter, former White House Correspondent
- Ben Burns (B.S.J. 1934), founding editor of Ebony and Jet
- David Callaway, former editor-in-chief of USA Today
- David Chalian, deputy political director, ABC News
- Joie Chen, Al Jazeera America Correspondent
- Lauren Chooljian, radio journalist for New Hampshire Public Radio
- Anupama Chopra, Indian film critic, and host of The Front Row on "Star World"
- Cindy Chupack, executive producer and writer of Sex and the City
- Jim Cummins (1945–2007), NBC News correspondent
- Paul Dana (1975–2006), Indy Race Car driver
- Frank DeCaro, radio personality at OutQ (Sirius XM)
- R. Bruce Dold, editor of The Chicago Tribune
- Jonathan Eig, reporter, editor, author
- Rich Eisen, NFL Network anchor
- Robin Fields, investigative reporter for ProPublica
- James Foley, journalist
- David T. Friendly, film producer (Little Miss Sunshine)
- Jack Fuller, Pulitzer Prize-winner and former editor and publisher of the Chicago Tribune
- Joshua Green, (M.S.J. 1998), senior national correspondent, Bloomberg Businessweek
- Lauren Green, religion correspondent, FOX News Channel
- Mike Greenberg, sports broadcaster for ESPN
- Jennifer Hale (sportscaster), sports broadcaster for Fox Sports
- Jon Heyman, senior baseball writer for Sports Illustrated and MLB Network insider
- Kwame Holman, producer, correspondent for PBS NewsHour and producer, reporter for WTOC-TV
- Cassidy Hubbarth, sports anchor for ESPN
- Stephen Hunter, Pulitzer Prize-winning film critic for The Washington Post and novelist
- Michael Isikoff, investigative reporter, Newsweek
- David Israel, columnist Washington Star, Chicago Tribune, Los Angeles Herald Examiner, former sportswriter Chicago Daily News
- Jeff Jarvis, media executive, blogger, professor, author
- Clara Jeffery, editor of Mother Jones magazine
- Omar Jimenez, reporter & correspondent for CNN
- Sherry Jones (M.S.J. 1971), senior producer, Frontline
- Dorothy Misener Jurney, called "the godmother of women's pages"
- Clinton Kelly, (M.S.J. 1993), co-host of TLC's What Not To Wear
- Hank Klibanoff (M.S.J. 1973), former managing editor of the Atlanta Journal-Constitution and Pulitzer Prize-winning co-author of The Race Beat: The Press, the Civil Rights Struggle, and the Awakening of a Nation
- Michelle Kosinski, correspondent for CNN, formerly of NBC News
- Vincent Laforet, Pulitzer Prize–winning photographer for The New York Times
- Nicole Lapin, an anchor for CNBC
- Michael Lazerow, entrepreneur and co-founder of Buddy Media, Inc.
- Elisabeth Leamy, 13-time Emmy award-winning correspondent for ABC News and The Dr. Oz Show
- Frank Main, Pulitzer Prize–winning reporter for Chicago Sun Times
- Garry Marshall, writer, director, producer, and actor (Happy Days, Pretty Woman, The Princess Diaries)
- George R.R. Martin, science fiction and fantasy author (A Song of Ice and Fire)
- Luke Matheny (B.S.J. 1997), Academy Award-winner, actor, writer, and director (God of Love)
- Britt McHenry, Fox News personality
- Alvera Mickelsen (M.S.J.), writer, journalism professor, advocate of Christian feminism and co-founder of Christians for Biblical Equality (CBE)
- Matt Murray, editor-in-chief of The Wall Street Journal
- Brent Musburger, sports broadcaster
- Vinita Nair, former co-anchor of ABC World News Now
- Kuldip Nayar, Indian journalist, Syndicated columnist, human rights activist, author and former High Commissioner of India to the United Kingdom
- Rachel Nichols, ESPN and The Washington Post reporter
- Gabriel Okara, pioneering West African poet
- Susan Page, Washington Bureau Chief, USA Today
- Barry Petersen, foreign correspondent, CBS News
- Neal Pollack, satirist, journalist and author (Alternadad)
- Seth Porges, technology writer, television commentator, Popular Mechanics editor
- Allissa Richardson, NABJ Journalism Professor of the Year, Bowie State University
- James Risen, Pulitzer Prize-winning investigative journalist, The New York Times
- Katie Rogers, White House correspondent, The New York Times
- David Ropeik, international consultant in risk perception
- Tina Rosenberg, Pulitzer Prize-winning author and journalist
- Caitlin Rother (B.S.J. 1987), New York Times best-selling author, Pulitzer Prize-nominated journalist
- Joe Ruklick, professional basketball player, writer for The Chicago Defender
- Roxana Saberi, freelance journalist jailed in Iran on accusations of espionage
- Adam Schefter, ESPN senior football reporter
- Anatole Shub, journalist for The Washington Post and The New York Times, author
- David Sirota, contributing writer for Salon.com, radio host
- Jane Skinner, former anchor for Fox News Channel
- Evan Smith, CEO and editor-in-chief of The Texas Tribune, former editor in chief of Texas Monthly magazine
- Dan Stoneking, sports editor of the Minneapolis Star and president of the Professional Hockey Writers' Association
- Laura Sullivan, investigative correspondent for NPR and Frontline and winner of three Peabody Awards
- Margaret M. Sullivan, public editor, The New York Times
- Lynn Sweet, Washington, D.C., bureau chief and columnist, Chicago Sun-Times
- Diane S. Sykes, federal judge on the United States Court of Appeals for the Seventh Circuit
- Judy Baar Topinka, former Illinois State Treasurer and Illinois Republican gubernatorial candidate
- Julia Wallace, editor of four metropolitan daily newspapers including the Atlanta Journal-Constitution (2002–2010), professor at Walter Cronkite School of Journalism and Mass Communication at Arizona State University
- Nicolle Wallace, former White House Communications Director, best-selling author, and senior adviser to McCain-Palin campaign
- Laura S. Washington, Chicago journalist, former editor of The Chicago Reporter
- David Weigel, national political correspondent for The Washington Post
- Gary Weiss, author and investigative reporter
- Steve Weissman, ESPN SportsCenter anchor
- Bryan West, Taylor Swift reporter for Gannett
- Michael Wilbon, ESPN personality (Pardon the Interruption) and The Washington Post sports columnist
