= I Knew It, I Knew You =

2026 single by Taylor Swift

- Standard cover

Single by Taylor Swift

from the album Toy Story 5 (Original Motion Picture Soundtrack)
- Written: February 2026
- Released: June 5, 2026
- Recorded: February 2026
- Studio: Electric Lady (New York City); Tamarind (Los Angeles)
- Genre: Country; country pop
- Length: 2:58
- Label: Walt Disney
- Songwriters: Taylor Swift; Jack Antonoff
- Producers: Taylor Swift; Jack Antonoff

Taylor Swift singles chronology
"Elizabeth Taylor" (2026)	"I Knew It, I Knew You" (2026)	"Patient Zero" (2026)

Music video
- "I Knew It, I Knew You" on YouTube

"I Knew It, I Knew You" is a song by the American singer-songwriter Taylor Swift from the soundtrack to Disney and Pixar's animated film Toy Story 5 (2026). Swift wrote and produced the song with Jack Antonoff, inspired by the Toy Story character Jessie. An upbeat country pop ballad, "I Knew It, I Knew You" is driven by a blues- and folk-influenced bassline and incorporates 14 musical instruments, including banjo, mandolin, saxophone, and harmonica. Written from Jessie's perspective, the lyrics employ a country-style songwriting to describe the narrator's unexpected reunion with a loved one.

The track was released on June 5, 2026, through Walt Disney Records, and was promoted to US country and pop radio formats. It topped the Billboard Global 200 and broke various records across radio and streaming services. "I Knew It, I Knew You" became Swift's 15th number-one single on the US Billboard Hot 100, where it marked Disney's first number-one debut and Pixar's first chart-topper. The track also reached number one in Australia, Austria, Belgium (Flanders), Canada, Germany, and the United Kingdom. It later ranked number two on the US Billboard Songs of the Summer chart.

"I Knew It, I Knew You" was met with acclaim from critics, who found it catchy and praised its narrative songwriting and Swift's vocal delivery. Among its accolades, the song won the Hollywood Music in Media Award for Best Original Song in an Animated Film and has been nominated for two Grammy Awards, including Song of the Year. The music video for the track consists of clips from the Toy Story films, with a particular focus on Jessie. Swift performed "I Knew It, I Knew You" live at the Toy Story 5 world premiere, the Grammy Museum, the Academy Museum, and the 2026 Country Music Association Awards.

== Background and development ==
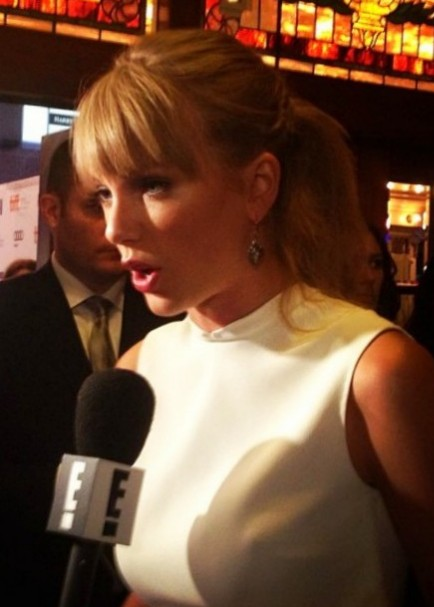
Swift at the 2013 Toronto International Film Festival

Taylor Swift was approached to contribute an original song for Disney and Pixar's animated film Toy Story 5 while on her Eras Tour (2023–2024). She was the only artist considered by the writer-director Andrew Stanton to follow Randy Newman in contributing music to the Toy Story franchise. Swift postponed discussions about the film until months after the tour concluded due to her touring commitments and need for rest. In September 2025, the producer Jessica Choi wrote Swift a letter discussing the film's female-focused direction; she argued that her involvement was necessary because of her career in a "male-dominated industry" and her use of music to address that experience. Stanton refused to pursue other artists and decided that the film would proceed without an original song if Swift declined.

In February 2026, when her schedule permitted, Swift requested to see Toy Story 5. After attending an early advance screening, she immediately conceived the song "I Knew It, I Knew You". She wrote and produced it with her longtime collaborator Jack Antonoff; it was written, produced, and recorded within eight hours after the screening. A longtime fan of the Toy Story franchise, Swift said that the song was inspired by the character Jessie and that she had wanted to write music for the franchise's characters since watching Toy Story (1995) at the age of five. Her contribution was endorsed by Newman.

Stanton described the song as fitting within the franchise like a "long-lost family member". He recalled becoming emotional upon hearing it, comparing the experience to when Newman first played "You've Got a Friend in Me" (1995) for him. According to Toy Story 5's visual effects supervisor Thomas Jordan, only a "very small group" knew about "I Knew It, I Knew You" before the week of its announcement, and Disney created a "decoy version" of the film without the song for the press and crew members. Tom Hanks, who voices the character Woody, said that the cast was unaware of Swift's involvement until hours before the announcement.

== Production and composition ==
=== Music ===
"I Knew It, I Knew You" incorporates 14 musical instruments: acoustic guitar, bass guitar, electric guitar, piano, percussion, strings, drum kit, banjo, mandolin, harmonica, saxophone, celesta, Hammond organ, and Mellotron. Antonoff played nine of them, with contributions from his Bleachers bandmates Michael Riddleberger, Sean Hutchinson, Mikey Freedom Hart, Evan Smith, and Zem Audu, and from the string player Bobby Hawk. The song was recorded by Antonoff, Laura Sisk, Oli Jacobs, and Jack Manning at Electric Lady Studios in New York City and Tamarind Studios in Los Angeles. Sisk mixed it at Sharp Sonics Studios (Los Angeles), while Ruairí O'Flaherty mastered it at Sterling Sound Studios (Los Angeles).

"I Knew It, I Knew You"
A sample of "I Knew It, I Knew You", featuring layered vocal harmonies after the second refrain over an arrangement of percussion, banjo, and saxophone.

"I Knew It, I Knew You" is 2 minutes and 58 seconds long. It is an upbeat country-pop ballad set to a midtempo rhythm. The track features pop and indie elements, a blues- and folk-influenced bassline, and a retro soul-style horn arrangement. It incorporates Americana-style harmonica trills and elements of folk-rock in the opening; banjos, saxophones, and "Beach Boys-style harmonies" after the second refrain; and a key change in the bridge. According to Swift, the composition was informed by Newman's distinctive chord progressions and musical sensibilities. Her vocals feature a slight twang, a "soft, staccato insistence", and a tentative whisper in the lyric "all you said was: 'Hi...'". The track's "billowing" background vocals are credited to Swift, Antonoff, and Sam Dew. The acoustic version of "I Knew It, I Knew You" combines a "modern twang" with classical instrumentation incorporating harpsichord, mandolin, harmonica, celesta, and Hammond organ, while the piano rendition features a slower, more balladic production.

Some journalists described the track as a return to Swift's country music roots. (Note: Journalists such as Slant Magazine's Alexa Camp, Variety's Chris Willman, USA Today's Bryan West, and Rolling Stone's Jaeden Pinder.) Bryan West of USA Today wrote that it recalled her songs "The Best Day" (2008), "Betty", and "Dorothea" (both 2020). Consequence's Liz Shannon Miller likened its steady bassline to Squeeze's single "Tempted" (1981), and its country twang to Swift's albums Taylor Swift (2006) and Folklore (2020), as well as her song "The Bolter" (2024). Neil McCormick of The Daily Telegraph described it as having a "1970s soft pop rock" quality reminiscent of Carole Bayer Sager and Neil Sedaka. The Guardian's Laura Snapes considered the rising chords accompanying the lyric "life has ways of leaving those days behind" a new melodic gesture for Swift.

=== Lyrics ===
What means a lot to me about this song is that in life you have friendships, you have memories with people, you form bonds, and then sometimes a path takes you a different way. Sometimes you see somebody again down the road and you're just like, 'Man, it's been a while.' Like, but you're the same person that I had all these memories with.

— Swift on "I Knew It, I Knew You"

Written from Jessie's perspective, the lyrics employ a country-style songwriting and explore themes of friendship, memories, and reconnection. They address the return of a loved one whom the narrator had thought lost or out of contact; the unexpected reunion prompts bittersweet memories and emotions and reminds them of their love for each other. The lyrics portray the highs and lows of their relationship over time and include "imagery-filled reflections" that reference first love and summer days. The narrator reflects on the past in the first verse, and the second verse expands on that reflection: "I watched you drive around the bend/ For what I thought would be the last time I saw my friend/ But love has ways of bringing things back to life". Swift stated that some lyrics had double meanings, including the opening lines, "I knew you through the daze of the blades of the grass in summer/ Parachutes for the free fall of being younger". She explained that "daze" described the blurred quality of childhood memories while also sounding like "days"; "blades of grass" alluded to childhood play and imagination, as well as the toys' small stature; and "parachutes" referred both to the army toys in Toy Story and to "somebody who helps you grow up, helps your landings be softer".

"I Knew It, I Knew You" was described by The Guardian's Laura Snapes as an answer song to another Toy Story track, "When She Loved Me" (1999); both Snapes and Slate's Dana Stevens interpreted it as a reunion between Jessie and her former owner, Emily. Snapes described the song as a "moment of gentle elation" in which Jessie recognizes Emily after years apart and opined that Swift's singing "trembles with a trace of anxiety at how precarious even that deep love can be." According to Elle's Alyssa Bailey, the lyrics hint at a new beginning for Jessie with a loved one. Miller observed that, like other Toy Story songs, the lyrics are told from a toy's point of view but are not explicitly confined to "the toy/human bond".

== Release and promotion ==
On April 30, 2026, Swift's official website briefly displayed a 48-hour countdown with a sky-blue background and white clouds reminiscent of imagery from the Toy Story franchise. It was removed after approximately ten minutes and expired without an announcement. That same day, Swift's official fan engagement team shared a cloud-themed post on social media. On May 29, Disney/Pixar billboards for Toy Story 5 displaying the initials "TS" against cloud imagery appeared in cities worldwide, and the cover artwork for Swift's album 1989 (Taylor's Version) (2023) was altered on streaming platforms to replace the seagulls in the background with five clouds. The following day, Pixar posted a video of Jessie dancing on top of the "TS" billboard, accompanied by a caption that references Swift's single "Shake It Off" (2014).

Further promotions included the cover artwork for Swift's album 1989 (2014) being updated with a Toy Story-style font; cloud imagery illuminating the Empire State Building; clouds appearing in TikTok searches for Swift's name; and her "essentials" playlist on Apple Music being updated to feature only the fifth tracks from her albums, with every "T" and "S" in the lyrics capitalized. A new countdown appeared on Swift's website and on billboards in New York City and Los Angeles on June 1; the website version was accompanied by an illustration of a house and barn, with Jessie appearing in the scene and the "TS" billboard placed on a hill beneath a cloudy sky. When the countdown ended at 14:00 Eastern Daylight Time (UTC−04:00), "I Knew It, I Knew You" was announced as an original song by Swift for Toy Story 5, along with its release date.

"I Knew It, I Knew You" plays during Toy Story 5's closing credits and appears first on the soundtrack's track listing. It was released through Walt Disney Records on June 5, two weeks before the film's release. The label also partnered with MCA Nashville and Republic Records to promote it to US country and pop radio on the same day. Its acoustic and piano renditions were released for digital download on June 7 and for streaming on June 12. The single was promoted to Italian radio airplay through Universal Music on June 12 and released on June 19 in three CD single editions (original, acoustic, and piano) and two 10-inch vinyl editions (both containing the original and instrumental versions).

=== Live performances ===
Swift performed "I Knew It, I Knew You" live for the first time at the Toy Story 5 world premiere at the Dolby Theatre on June 9, 2026, playing an acoustic rendition of the track on a grand piano. The performance received a standing ovation from the audience. Billboard's Katie Atkinson praised Swift's vocals and wrote that the piano arrangement added emotional weight to the song. On August 18, Swift performed the track during a career retrospective hosted by the Recording Academy's Songwriters and Composers Wing at the Grammy Museum, Los Angeles; she incorporated it into a piano medley with her songs "August" (2020) and "All Too Well (10 Minute Version)" (2021).

Swift performed the track alongside a backup band as part of a four-song closing set at the Academy Museum Gala—an annual fundraiser for the Academy Museum—on October 17. At the 60th Annual Country Music Association Awards on November 18, she played "I Knew It, I Knew You" on acoustic guitar in a mashup with her single "Our Song" (2007), accompanied by a backup band and Keith Urban playing a banjo guitar. The Jessie-themed performance featured guest appearances from various country musicians. Billboard's Jessica Nicholson ranked it as the best performance of the ceremony, believing that "Swift's always entertaining, fun and theatrical approach to performing was a perfect fit for the song".

== Critical reception ==
"I Knew It, I Knew You" was met with acclaim from critics, who called it catchy and praised Swift's vocal delivery. Chris Willman of Variety considered the track "sprightly and upbeat" and commended its "patented" bridge, and Rolling Stone's Jaeden Pinder described it as "blissful" and praised the refrain as catchy. Miller regarded the production as smooth and warm, adding that the bassline contributed to the song's earworm quality, particularly in the bridge and its accompanying key change. McCormick described "I Knew It, I Knew You" as "catchy and cheery and effusively upbeat", complimenting its "breezily simple yet lush" musical arrangement and Swift's vocal delivery. Snapes similarly praised her vocal delivery and the organic instrumentation. Jody Rosen and Stephen Metcalf both commended Swift's vocal performance; the former deemed the production of "I Knew It, I Knew You" more "spacious" than Antonoff's past work and found Swift's vocals more relaxed and "easeful" than usual.

Critics also commended the songwriting of "I Knew It, I Knew You". Bailey deemed it an "emotionally moving" song whose lyrics capture Jessie's journey, while West praised its vivid and nostalgic storytelling that recalled Swift's earlier songwriting style, which he characterized as turning "small moments into universal stories". McCormick also commended the tightly packed couplets and internal rhymes in the lyrics, and Snapes wrote that "I Knew It, I Knew You" contained some of Swift's "loveliest" and tightest songwriting.

The song received "Oscar buzz". Various journalists considered the single a contender for the Academy Award for Best Original Song since its release. (Note: Journalists such as Consequence's Liz Shannon Miller, The Hollywood Reporter's Scott Feinberg, Forbes's Conor Murray, Billboard's Paul Grein, and Variety's Clayton Davis.) In September 2026, IndieWire and The Hollywood Reporter picked the song as the front-runner in the category at the forthcoming ceremony. The latter's awards analyst Scott Feinberg reported that "I Knew It, I Knew You" received praise from members of the Motion Picture Academy and other film-industry figures at the film's premiere. At the 69th Annual Grammy Awards, "I Knew It, I Knew You" has been nominated for Song of the Year and Best Song Written for Visual Media, the former marking Swift's record-extending ninth nomination in this category (tied with Antonoff).

== Commercial performance ==
"I Knew It, I Knew You" became the most-streamed country song in a single day by a female artist on Spotify and the most-streamed soundtrack single in its first day on Apple Music. It also achieved the highest first-day streams of 2026 on Amazon Music and became the biggest country single of 2026 on Apple Music. The track debuted at number one on the Billboard Global 200 chart dated June 20, 2026, marking Swift's seventh chart-topper and extending her record among soloists. It became the second number-one song from an animated Disney film and the first from Pixar.

=== United States ===
"I Knew It, I Knew You" became Swift's 15th number-one single on the Billboard Hot 100, placing her third among artists with the most chart-toppers, and her ninth number-one debut, the most among women. The track also made her the fourth artist to earn 10 or more number ones in a single decade. It was the third number one from an animated Disney film and the first to debut atop the chart, as well as the first chart-topper from Pixar. It later ranked number two on the Songs of the Summer chart based on its June–September performance on the Billboard Hot 100. "I Knew It, I Knew You" made Swift the first artist with multiple top-10 debuts on Radio Songs and subsequently became her ninth number-one single on the chart. It also marked her 11th number one on Streaming Songs and her record-extending 32nd number one on Digital Song Sales. "I Knew It, I Knew You" reached number one on Adult Pop Airplay and Pop Airplay, becoming Swift's record-extending 16th number-one single on both charts.

The single also performed strongly on country charts and radio. It became the first song by a female artist in Mediabase history to be added by every country radio station in its first week. Various country radio programmers highlighted its composition and radio appeal. RJ Curtis, the executive director of Country Radio Broadcasters, stated that the single was well-crafted for country radio due to its storytelling, melody, and "catchy hook that is quickly familiar and feels nostalgic." "I Knew It, I Knew You" debuted at number eight on Country Airplay, becoming Swift's first top-10 single on the chart since "Red" in December 2013. It was the first song by a female artist—and the second overall, after Garth Brooks's "More Than a Memory" (2007)—to debut in the chart's top 10. The track also became Swift's 10th number-one single on Hot Country Songs.

=== Other markets ===
"I Knew It, I Knew You" became Swift's 14th number-one song in both Australia and Canada, tying her with Elvis Presley for the second-most chart-toppers in Australia and with Drake for the most number ones on the Canadian Hot 100. In the United Kingdom, it became Swift's seventh number-one song and made her the first non-British artist to have two chart-toppers in 2026, following "Opalite"; this also marked the first time that Swift achieved multiple number ones in a calendar year. "I Knew It, I Knew You" spent a second week atop the UK chart with 71,000 units, recording the biggest week for a single in 2026. It also registered the biggest sales week for a single since "Now and Then" by the Beatles in 2023. "I Knew It, I Knew You" became Swift's third chart-topper in Germany and also reached number one in Austria and Belgium (Flanders), and the top 10 in Ireland (2), New Zealand (5), Singapore (5), the Netherlands (9), and France (10).

== Music video ==
The music video for "I Knew It, I Knew You" premiered on Apple Music and Spotify Premium on June 5, 2026. It consists of footage from the Toy Story films, with a particular focus on Jessie. The video begins with Jessie meeting Woody for the first time and includes flashbacks to Emily abandoning her in a donation box, as well as scenes with her newest owner, Bonnie. It also shows Jessie adventuring with Woody, Buzz Lightyear, Bullseye, and the other characters, as well as riding a horse, surviving dangerous encounters, and developing a romance with Buzz Lightyear. The video ends with clips of Emily playing with Jessie in a tire swing before they fall into a pile of leaves.

A lyric video for "I Knew It, I Knew You" was also released, featuring an original animated narrative created from static Toy Story 5 end-credit artwork and structured around the lyrics, with custom frame rates and handcrafted movement. On August 27, 2026, the music video for the piano rendition of "I Knew It, I Knew You" was released on Apple Music, Spotify, and Disney+, featuring footage from Toy Story 5.

== Accolades ==
List of awards and nominations received by "I Knew It, I Knew You"
Organization	Year (Note: Indicates the year of ceremony. Each year is linked to the article about the awards held that year, wherever possible.)	Category	Result	Ref(s).
Country Music Association Awards	2026	Single of the Year	Nominated	
Grammy Awards	2027	Song of the Year	Pending	
Grammy Awards	2027	Best Song Written for Visual Media	Pending	
Hollywood Music in Media Awards	2026	Best Original Song – Animated Film	Won	
MTV Video Music Awards	2026	Song of Summer	Nominated	
Nickelodeon Kids' Choice Awards	2026	Favorite Song from a Movie	Nominated	
Weibo Music Awards	2026	Song of the Year – Foreign	Nominated	

== Personnel ==
Adapted from the song's liner notes

- Taylor Swift – songwriter, producer, lead vocals, background vocals
- Jack Antonoff – songwriter, producer, recording engineer, background vocals, acoustic guitar, electric guitar, percussion, drum kit, banjo, mandolin, harmonica, celesta, Mellotron
- Sam Dew – background vocals
- Michael Riddleberger – drum kit
- Sean Hutchinson – drum kit
- Bobby Hawk – strings
- Mikey Freedom Hart – piano, bass guitar, Hammond organ
- Evan Smith – saxophone
- Zem Audu – saxophone
- Laura Sisk – recording engineer, mixing engineer
- Oli Jacobs – recording engineer
- Jack Manning – recording engineer
- Ruairí O'Flaherty – mastering engineer
- Jozef Caldwell – assistant recording engineer
- Kellie McGrew – assistant recording engineer
- Joey Miller – assistant recording engineer
- Cam Gilfoy – assistant mixing engineer
- Tom MacDougall – executive producer
- Beth Garrabrant – photographer

== Charts ==
=== Weekly charts ===
Weekly chart performance
Chart (2026)	Peak position
Argentina Hot 100 (Billboard)	22
Argentina Airplay (Monitor Latino)	5
Australia (ARIA)	1
Australia Airplay (RCS)	1
Austria (Ö3 Austria Top 40)	1
Belgium (Ultratop 50 Flanders)	1
Belgium (Ultratop 50 Wallonia)	22
Bolivia Anglo Airplay (Monitor Latino)	3
Brazil Hot 100 (Billboard)	78
Canada Hot 100 (Billboard)	1
Canada AC (Billboard)	1
Canada CHR/Top 40 (Billboard)	6
Canada Country (Billboard)	1
Canada Hot AC (Billboard)	3
Central America Anglo Airplay (Monitor Latino)	6
Chile Anglo Airplay (Monitor Latino)	10
Colombia Anglo Airplay (Monitor Latino)	8
Costa Rica Anglo Airplay (Monitor Latino)	7
Croatia International Airplay (Top lista)	57
Denmark Airplay (Tracklisten)	2
Dominican Republic Anglo Airplay (Monitor Latino)	3
Ecuador Anglo Airplay (Monitor Latino)	10
Estonia Airplay (TopHit)	27
France (SNEP)	10
Germany (GfK)	1
Germany Airplay (MusicTrace)	1
Global 200 (Billboard)	1
Guatemala Anglo Airplay (Monitor Latino)	11
Hong Kong (Billboard)	14
India International (IMI)	16
Ireland (IRMA)	2
Israel International Airplay (Media Forest)	6
Italy Airplay (EarOne)	67
Jamaica Airplay (JAMMS)	8
Japan Digital Singles (Oricon)	48
Japan Hot 100 (Billboard)	34
Japan Hot Animation (Billboard Japan)	7
Latin America Anglo Airplay (Monitor Latino)	7
Latvia Airplay (TopHit)	82
Lithuania (AGATA)	50
Lithuania Airplay (TopHit)	2
Malaysia International (RIM)	19
Malta Airplay (Radiomonitor)	4
Mexico Anglo Airplay (Monitor Latino)	5
Moldova Airplay (TopHit)	52
Netherlands (Dutch Top 40)	19
Netherlands (Single Top 100)	9
New Zealand (Recorded Music NZ)	5
Nigeria (TurnTable Top 100)	67
Nigeria Airplay (TurnTable)	41
Norway (VG-lista)	30
Norway Airplay (IFPI)	28
Panama International (PRODUCE)	8
Paraguay Anglo Airplay (Monitor Latino)	9
Peru Anglo Airplay (Monitor Latino)	8
Philippines (IFPI)	19
Philippines Hot 100 (Billboard Philippines)	21
Puerto Rico Anglo Airplay (Monitor Latino)	2
Singapore (RIAS)	5
Slovakia Airplay (ČNS IFPI)	11
Slovenia Airplay (Radiomonitor)	14
South Africa Airplay (TOSAC)	2
South Africa Streaming (TOSAC)	69
South Korea BGM (Circle)	100
South Korea Download (Circle)	130
Spain (Promusicae)	47
Suriname (Nationale Top 40)	11
Sweden (Sverigetopplistan)	21
Switzerland (Schweizer Hitparade)	18
Switzerland Airplay (MusicTrace)	10
Taiwan (Billboard)	16
UK Singles (Official Charts)	1
UK Airplay (Radiomonitor)	1
Uruguay Anglo Airplay (Monitor Latino)	5
US Billboard Hot 100	1
US Adult Contemporary (Billboard)	7
US Adult Pop Airplay (Billboard)	1
US Country Airplay (Billboard)	2
US Hot Country Songs (Billboard)	1
US Pop Airplay (Billboard)	1
Venezuela Airplay (Record Report)	16

=== Monthly charts ===
Monthly chart performance
Chart (2026)	Peak position
Estonia Airplay (TopHit)	35
Lithuania Airplay (TopHit)	5
Paraguay Airplay (SGP)	67

== Certifications ==
Certifications
Region	Certification	Certified units/sales
New Zealand (RMNZ)	Gold	15,000^{‡}
United Kingdom (BPI)	Gold	400,000^{‡}
^{‡} Sales+streaming figures based on certification alone.

== Release history ==
Release formats and dates
Region	Date	Format	Version	Label	Ref.
Various	June 5, 2026	Digital download; streaming	Original	Walt Disney	
United States	June 5, 2026	Country radio; contemporary hit radio	Original	Walt Disney; Republic; MCA Nashville	
Various	June 7, 2026	Digital download	Acoustic	Walt Disney	
Various	June 7, 2026	Digital download	Piano	Walt Disney	
Italy	June 12, 2026	Radio airplay	Original	Universal	
Various	June 12, 2026	Streaming	Original; piano; acoustic	Walt Disney	
Various	June 19, 2026	CD single	Original	Walt Disney	
Various	June 19, 2026	CD single	Acoustic	Walt Disney	
Various	June 19, 2026	CD single	Piano	Walt Disney	
Various	June 19, 2026	10-inch vinyl	Original; instrumental	Walt Disney	
