= The Ford Heights Four =

Americans wrongly convicted of murder

The Ford Heights Four (Verneal Jimerson, Dennis Williams, Kenneth Adams, and Willie Rainge) were formerly imprisoned convicts, who were falsely accused and convicted of the double murder of Lawrence Lionberg and Carol Schmal in Ford Heights, Illinois, and later exonerated. Jimerson and Williams were sentenced to death, Adams to 75 years in prison and Rainge to life. Following the murder in 1978, the four spent almost two decades in prison before being released in 1996. This miscarriage of justice was due to false forensic testimony, coercion of a prosecution witness, perjury by another witness who had an incentive to lie, and prosecution and police misconduct. The DNA evidence uncovered in the investigation to clear their names eventually led to the arrest and conviction of the real killers.

== Murder and first trial ==
On May 11, 1978, 28-year-old Lawrence Lionberg (who was working a night shift at a Homewood, Illinois, gas station) and his 23-year-old fiancé Carol Schmal were kidnapped. Schmal was raped several times and both were shot in the back of the head. There was a public outcry at the brutal murder.

The four suspects were tried in 1978. A witness, Charles McCraney, claimed to have seen Williams, Rainge and Adams near the crime scene area in Ford Heights (at the time called East Chicago Heights) at the time of the crime. A state expert witness, Michael Podlecki, said that at least one of the rapists was type A secretor blood (shared by 25% of the population) and Williams and Adams had Type A secretor blood (an independent forensic witness found in 1987 that Williams and Adams actually had non-secretor blood). Podlecki also claimed that hairs from the back of Williams car were consistent with Lionberg and Schmal. No other physical evidence matched the suspects to the crime. A convict, David Jackson, testified that he had overheard Williams and Rainge in jail discussing the murder and rape (Jackson later admitted he had fabricated this evidence because he was offered a deal by the authorities). The prosecution eliminated all black jurors from the trial (the defendants were all black and the murder victims were white). The police did not inform the defense that a witness, Marvin Simpson, heard shots and identified four men running from the murder scene - Arthur Robinson, Juan Rodriguez, Ira and Dennis Johnson (these four were later found to be the real killers). Family members of the Ford Four testified they were elsewhere at the time of the murder. The defendants' lawyer, Archie B. Weston, was ineffective, and was the subject of a legal disciplinary hearing at the time and was later disbarred. A witness, Paula Gray, (with an IQ of 55), testified to prosecutors that she had seen the defendants shoot the victims and rape Schmal. However, she withdrew her evidence before the court case and prosecutors charged her with murder and perjury. Williams was sentenced to death, while Adams was sentenced to 75 years, Rainge to life, and Paula Gray to 50 years in 1978. Jimerson could not be charged as McCraney had not mentioned Jimerson in his testimony and Paula Gray had withdrawn her testimony.

== Appeals and further trials ==
On appeal, the Supreme Court of Illinois reversed the convictions of Williams and Rainge in 1982 because the defendants' lawyer was incompetent and was the subject of a legal disciplinary hearing. Prosecutors offered Paula Gray a deal to get out of jail if she testified she had seen Jimerson, Williams and Rainge shoot the victims and rape Schmal and she accepted. In 1985 McCraney had changed his evidence to include seeing Jimerson who was sentenced to death. In 1987 Williams was sentenced to death and Rainge to life at a retrial. Paula Gray was released from prison in 1987.

== Exoneration ==
Three female students (including Laura Sullivan who is now an award-winning investigative correspondent for NPR) working under Professor David Protess of the Northwestern University Medill School of Journalism investigated this case and found the Marvin Simpson witness statement testifying to seeing Robinson, Rodriguez, Ira and Dennis Johnson fleeing from the murder scene. Jackson and Paula Gray recanted their evidence. The students also got DNA tests done which showed Jimerson, Williams, Adams and Rainge were innocent and, eventually, that Robinson, Rodriguez, Ira and Dennis Johnson were guilty and three of them confessed (Dennis Johnson had died of a drug overdose in 1993) and Robinson, Rodriguez and Ira were convicted. The Ford Heights Four were exonerated and freed in 1996. Robinson, Johnson and Rodriguez were sentenced to life in prison. Johnson's sentence was later reduced to 65 years.

The Ford Heights Four received $36 million in 1999 in civil rights damages from Cook County - the largest settlement in US history at the time. Dennis Williams died from a heart attack at the age of 46 in March 2003.

George Ryan, the Governor of Illinois, declared a moratorium on the state's death penalty in 2000 citing the Ford Heights Four as one example of men who would have been executed if it had not been for the unpaid work of the Northwestern University journalism professors and students.

== See also ==
- List of wrongful convictions in the United States
- Brady v. Maryland
- Batson v. Kentucky

== Bibliography ==
- A Promise of Justice, Hyperion (1998). Rob Warden and David Protess
