= American Woman (book) =

2024 book by Katie Rogers

American Woman is a 2024 non-fiction book by Katie Rogers about the changing role of the American first lady. While focusing primarily on Hillary Rodham Clinton, Laura Bush, Michelle Obama, Melania Trump and Jill Biden, the book also explores the legacy and impact of the first ladies who preceded them, especially those since Jackie Onassis. In addition to an exploration of how technology has changed the lives of these women, the book also explores the pressures they experienced about their lives before their husbands were elected and the challenges they faced exploring and implementing their own agendas.

The book uses interviews, biographies and memoirs to show these women as the full people they are beyond the role they served for their husbands' presidencies.
