= Toy Story 5 (soundtrack) =

Toy Story 5 (Original Motion Picture Soundtrack)

Soundtrack album by Randy Newman
- Released: June 19, 2026
- Recorded: 2025–2026
- Studios: Sony Scoring Stage, Sony Pictures Studios, Culver City, California
- Genre: Film score
- Length: 75:59
- Label: Walt Disney
- Producers: Jack Antonoff; Joey Newman; Taylor Swift

Randy Newman chronology
Marriage Story (2019)	Toy Story 5 (Original Motion Picture Soundtrack) (2026)

Singles from Toy Story 5 (Original Motion Picture Soundtrack)
- 1. "I Knew It, I Knew You" Released: June 5, 2026

Toy Story 5 (Original Motion Picture Soundtrack) is the film score to the 2026 Disney/Pixar animated film Toy Story 5. It features the score composed by Randy Newman, and conducted by him and his cousin, Joey Newman, alongside an original song, "I Knew It, I Knew You" by Taylor Swift. The soundtrack album was released through Walt Disney Records on June 19, the same day as the film's release.

== Background ==
=== Original score ===
"Randy has been a part of this journey for 30 years [...] His music is part of the DNA of these films. He has an encyclopedic knowledge of the story and these characters, and it makes all the difference because it allows you to lean into nostalgia and also break away from it and create something new. To have him back is huge."

— Lindsay Collins, producer, regarding franchise veteran Randy Newman's return to Toy Story 5

Randy Newman, who composed the previous installments in the Toy Story film series, returned to score Toy Story 5. It also marks Randy's first collaboration with the director Andrew Stanton, who had often collaborated with Randy's cousin Thomas for all of his previous animated directorial films, and also his 10th Pixar film overall. Randy considered being privileged to be connected with the Pixar franchise on this franchise, along with the Monsters, Inc. and Cars (first and third film) franchise. Randy added that he had more fun scoring Toy Story 5 than any of its predecessors.

As Toy Story 5 focuses on a clash between technology and toys, which involves higher stakes, Randy provided the cue "Making Land" as the musical motif, which he described as utilizing brass and percussion to bring a real military feel. He further incorporated a male choir, which was reminiscent of the marine choir as "part of their whole makeup". The choir served right for the escape sequence that involved machines and cranes. Randy stated that he was influenced by Lucky Jim (1957), which featured a chorus singing, "Ah, Lucky Jim, how I envy him" as the basis for the choir.

For Bonnie's theme, Randy utilized strings from the symphony orchestra to underscore her journey as she grapples with the idea of screen time and differentiating online friends and real friendship. Jessie's theme was described as an "up-tempo cowboy music". For Lilypad, Randy initially envisioned an aggressive electric sound, but in the end, Lilypad's soundscape utilized her own gadgetry noises by the sound team. Overall 25 newer cues were written for Toy Story 5.

=== Original song ===
Like the previous films, the music for Toy Story 5 revisits the themes and songs composed by Randy for the previous installments, including the song "When She Loved Me" for Toy Story 2 (1999), which was used for the nostalgia that reminds the audience of the emotional moments. The song "You've Got a Friend in Me" from the first film, which recurred in all the forthcoming installments of the franchise, is also featured in this film.

On June 1, 2026, after widespread speculation, Taylor Swift announced that she had contributed an original song for the film, titled "I Knew It, I Knew You". Swift, who attended an advance screening of the film, co-wrote and co-produced the song with Jack Antonoff and presented it to Disney CEO Bob Iger and President of Walt Disney Music Tom MacDougall, the latter served as the executive producer of the album.

Regarding Swift's involvement, Randy complimented her to be "remarkably grounded and a really nice person, like a really nice Southern girl was what she was like". Randy said that she had an half-an-hour to rehearse the song, and was not concerned about Swift not understanding the lyrics but felt that one of the keys might be too high as most of the songs were written in E-flat major, and asked her to do in another key which Swift politely refused. Randy further stated that Swift's song was not incorporated into the score or its themes, as it was a last-minute addition.

== Release ==
"I Knew It, I Knew You" was released as the lead single from the album on June 5, 2026. The soundtrack to Toy Story 5 was released day-and-date with the film on June 19. A CD version of the album released on September 16th, 2026 through Walt Disney Records. A 2-LP vinyl set featuring the tracks also released.

== Commercial performance ==
The song "I Knew It, I Knew You" topped the Billboard Global 200 chart, thereby becoming the first song from the Disney and Pixar film to reach the number one charts, and also Swift's seventh song to reach the number one charts.

== Reception ==
Helen O'Hara of Empire wrote "Randy Newman's score here dips regularly back into the melody of that Sarah McLachlan tearjerker to really tug the heartstrings". David Rooney of The Hollywood Reporter said that "the dulcet tones of Randy Newman's score" enables the film's poignancy. Amy Nicholson of Los Angeles Times wrote "Randy Newman's score even drums up a rousing Viking chant". Tim Grierson of Screen International wrote "[Randy] Newman's wistful Toy Story 5 score incorporates elements of 'When She Loved Me's' melody to touching effect, sonically weaving Jessie's anxiety into the film's fabric."

== Track listing ==
All tracks are written by Randy Newman and produced by Joey Newman except "I Knew It, I Knew You".

No.	Title	Writer(s)	Producer(s)	Length
1.	"I Knew It, I Knew You" (performed by Taylor Swift)	Swift; Jack Antonoff	Swift; Antonoff	2:58
2.	"Buzzs"			2:34
3.	"Tire Swing Hill"			1:22
4.	"Tech Boom"			3:06
5.	"Bonnie's New E-Friends"			2:11
6.	"Calling Woody"			4:40
7.	"Making Land"			2:01
8.	"Back Home"			2:46
9.	"Welcome Woody"			4:05
10.	"Shed Toys"			1:09
11.	"Smarty Pants"			1:33
12.	"Man Down"			0:38
13.	"The Drawer"			2:53
14.	"Blaze"			5:31
15.	"Bonnie Returns"			1:52
16.	"Truce"			1:59
17.	"Operation Jessie"			2:05
18.	"Queen Jimmy"			1:07
19.	"Hey Lily"			4:20
20.	"Bad News"			3:49
21.	"Interrogation"			4:25
22.	"Breakdown"			1:57
23.	"Buried Treasure"			5:01
24.	"Highway Robbery"			6:09
25.	"Reunion"			3:16
26.	"Bonnie and Blaze"			1:24
27.	"Happy Landing"			1:08
Total length:				75:59

== Personnel ==
Credits adapted from Film Music Reporter:

- Music composer: Randy Newman
- Executive music producer: Tom MacDougall
- Music supervisor: Matt Walker
- Music producer: Joey Newman
- Vice president, music production: Andrew Page
- Music editors: Joe E. Rand, Ramiro Belgardt
- Orchestrator: Don Davis
- Recording and mixing: David Boucher
- SVP, music business affairs: Donna Cole-Brulé
- Manager, music production: Lauren Harrold
- Music production coordinator: Caleb Hsu
- Executive music assistants: Jill Heffley, Jimmy Tsai
- Digital score recordist: Kevin Harp
- Orchestra conductor: Joey Newman, Timothy Loo
- Choir conductor and contractor: Jasper Randall
- Music preparation: JoAnn Kane Music Service
- Music librarians: Mark Graham, Victor Pesavento
- Music clearance director: Debra Roberts
- Recording studio: Sony Pictures Scoring Stage
- Scoring crew: Greg Dennen, Jeff Fitzpatrick, Julianne McCormack, Assen Stoyanov, Damon Tedesco, Keith Ukrisna, Richard Wheeler Jr.

== Charts ==
Chart performance for Toy Story 5 (Original Motion Picture Soundtrack)
Chart (2026)	Peak position
Belgian Albums (Ultratop Flanders)	80
Belgian Albums (Ultratop Wallonia)	155
Canadian Albums (Billboard)	91
French Physical Albums (SNEP)	51
UK Compilation Albums (Official Charts)	39
UK Classical Albums (Official Charts)	2
UK Soundtrack Albums (Official Charts)	4
US Billboard 200	67
US Kid Albums (Billboard)	1
US Independent Albums (Billboard)	9
US Soundtrack Albums (Billboard)	2
