= Ari Berman (journalist) =

American journalist

Ari Berman is an American political journalist. Berman has been the national voting rights correspondent for Mother Jones magazine, and regularly appears on MS NOW to discuss gerrymandering, voting restrictions, and the Voting Rights Act.

In 2022, Berman won the Hillman Prize for Magazine Journalism for his reporting about a dark money group that bragged about writing voter suppression bills across the country. In 2023, he won an Edward R. Murrow Award in the network radio investigative reporting category for his Reveal episode, "The Ballot Boogeymen."

He graduated with a degree in journalism and political science from the Medill School of Journalism at Northwestern University.

== Books ==
- Herding Donkeys: The Fight to Rebuild the Democratic Party and Reshape American Politics (Farrar, Straus and Giroux, 2010)
- Give Us the Ballot: The Modern Struggle for Voting Rights in America (Farrar, Straus and Giroux, 2015)
- Minority Rule: The Right-Wing Attack on the Will of the People—and the Fight to Resist It (Farrar, Straus and Giroux, 2024)
