= Anthony McKinney murder conviction controversy =

Anthony McKinney was a prisoner convicted of killing a security guard in 1978 in Harvey, Illinois. He was the subject of a Medill Innocence Project effort to reinvestigate his case and determine if he was wrongfully convicted. The case obtained notoriety after the Cook County state's attorney subpoenaed the Medill School of Journalism students' grades, class syllabus, and personal e-mails. This case is relevant to issues of Freedom of the Press because of the subpoena of journalism school class records as well as issues relating to possible wrongful conviction.

Anthony McKinney died on 27 August 2013 of a suspected heart attack in his cell at Dixon Correctional Center in northern Illinois, after thirty-five years in prison.
