= John Lavine =

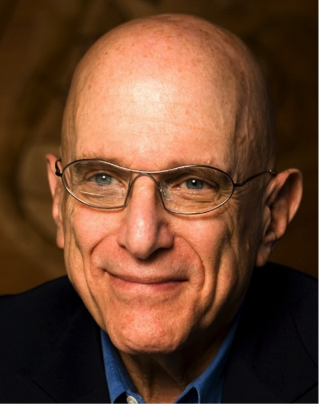
John Lavine (2013)

John Lavine is a United States journalist and educator and currently the chief executive officer of StrategicMediaGroup.com. Previously, he was a media company publisher and editor, and then professor and Dean of Northwestern University's Medill School of Journalism, Media, Integrated Marketing Communications, as well as a professor of media management and strategy at the Kellogg School of Management.

For more than 30 years, Lavine has studied and spoken internationally about emerging media and content trends and how to increase audience engagement and understanding. Most recently, he has produced digital learning content for more than 40,000 professionals in 194 countries and focused on building social media with measured return on investment.

== Life ==
Lavine graduated from Carleton College in 1963. The first half of Lavine's career spanned 25 years as a publisher and editor of a group of four daily and four weekly newspapers in Wisconsin. His editorials were syndicated nationally by King Features. He held leadership positions with major industry associations, including Newspaper Association of America, Inland Press, and Inter American Press Association.

During those years, Lavine was the publisher and co-founder with Kenneth Swaiman of Pediatric Neurology, an international medical journal. He was also a co-founder of the American half of Cygnet Films of London. The company made documentaries, films for television, educational and sports films, and it was the official cinematographers for the American Basketball Association.

During his years as a media executive, Lavine concentrated his volunteer time on education. He was a regent and vice president of the University of Wisconsin System Board of Regents and was instrumental in merging the state universities and the University of Wisconsin into what was then the nation's fourth largest university system. In addition, he served as a trustee of Coker College, an experimental school in Hartsville, North Carolina, as well as a member of the board of Antioch College in Yellow Springs, Ohio, and on the board of one of the nation's federal educational laboratories. He received an honorary LLD degree from Emerson College in Boston, Massachusetts.

Beginning in the 1980s, Lavine helped to create the academic field of media management. From 1984 to 1989 he was the first John and Elizabeth Cowles Professor of Media Management and Economics at the University of Minnesota. He co-authored with Danial Wackman, Managing Media Organizations: Effective Leadership of the Media. It was the first text on the subject.

In 1989, Lavine came to Northwestern University, where he founded the Media Management Center. From 1989 through 2005, the center educated senior executives around the world and did research on some of the media's most pressing problems. The center conducted millions of dollars of research on audience engagement with print, broadcast, and digital media. Lavine regularly presented the Media Management Center's research findings to thousands of media leaders in the U.S. and internationally.

Lavine also launched and chaired the Kellogg School of Management's major in media management for MBAs. He directed the major study of Latin American media for the Inter American Press Association and in 2004 created the International Media Management Academic Association (IMMAA) with Professor Christian Scholz from the University of Saarland in Saarbruken, Germany.

On January 9, 2006, Lavine became dean of the Medill School of Journalism. He was asked by Northwestern's president and provost to envision and lead a major plan to prepare Medill for the digital age. The school's faculty grew by more than 50 percent and was commended by the accrediting agency ACEJMC for its pace setting accomplishments. Medill and the School of Communication also opened Northwestern's first new campus in Doha, Qatar.

In reaction to the sweeping changes Lavine instituted to bring Medill into the digital age, there was also backlash and controversy. In 2008, he was the subject of an investigation by Northwestern Provost Daniel I. Linzer into whether Lavine fabricated quotes in the alumni magazine from unidentified students who supported what was happening at the school. Wrote Linzer: "The committee found that there is ample evidence that the quotes were consistent with sentiment students expressed about the course in course evaluations and no evidence to point to any likelihood that the quotes were fabricated."

After finishing six years as a dean, Lavine and the Media Management Center team pioneered the creation of a series of MOOCs - massive open online courses - for professionals. The last MOOCs he taught were taken by more than 40,000 people in 194 countries. The Center's MOOCs consistently incorporated new approaches and technologies to personalize and deepen the impact for the professionals who took them. In 2016, Northwestern honored Lavine with emeritus status as a professor and as Medill’s dean.

In 2016, Lavine moved from Evanston, Illinois to Marin County, north of San Francisco and became CEO of StrategicMediaGroup.com.
