= Ben Burns =

American editor of Black publications (1914–2000)

- Born: Benjamin Bernstein; August 25, 1913; Chicago, Illinois
- Died: January 29, 2000 (aged 86); Atlantis, Florida
- Education: Northwestern University
- Occupations: Editor; Public relations executive
- Years active: 1937–1977
- Spouse: Esther Stern (m. 1937)
- Children: 3

Ben Burns (August 25, 1913 – January 29, 2000) was an American pioneering editor of black publications (including the Chicago Daily Defender, Ebony, Jet and Negro Digest) and a public relations executive in Chicago. He was a “top executive editor” for the Johnson Publishing Company who became so well known as a “black newspaperman” – even though he was Jewish – that he was invited to submit his biography for inclusion in Who's Who in Colored America.

== Early life ==
Burns was born Benjamin Bernstein in Chicago in 1913 to Polish Jewish parents, Alexander and Frieda Bernstein. At the time of his birth at Michael Reese Hospital, the family lived on Chicago's Near West Side. Burns grew up in the slums of Chicago. His father was a house painter originally from Łódź. His mother was born in Warsaw. His mother divorced Alexander when Burns was a year old, and married Nathan Denison, a Chicago produce dealer. Esther Burns's parents also lived in Chicago.

Burns spent his teen years in New York's West Side, graduating in 1930 from James Monroe High School. He attended New York University, where he so enjoyed working on the NYU Daily News that when it was shut down in 1933 he decided not to finish his senior year. Instead, he returned to Chicago, enrolling in the Northwestern University journalism program, from which he graduated in 1934.

In 1935, he joined the Young Communist League, in part because of its reputed opposition to the emergence of Adolf Hitler's anti-Semitism, in part because of its social positions. He maintained a connection to the party until he was expelled from it in 1948.

Burns married Esther Stern on November 28, 1937. The couple, married for over 62 years, had three children.

== Journalism career ==
=== Beginnings ===
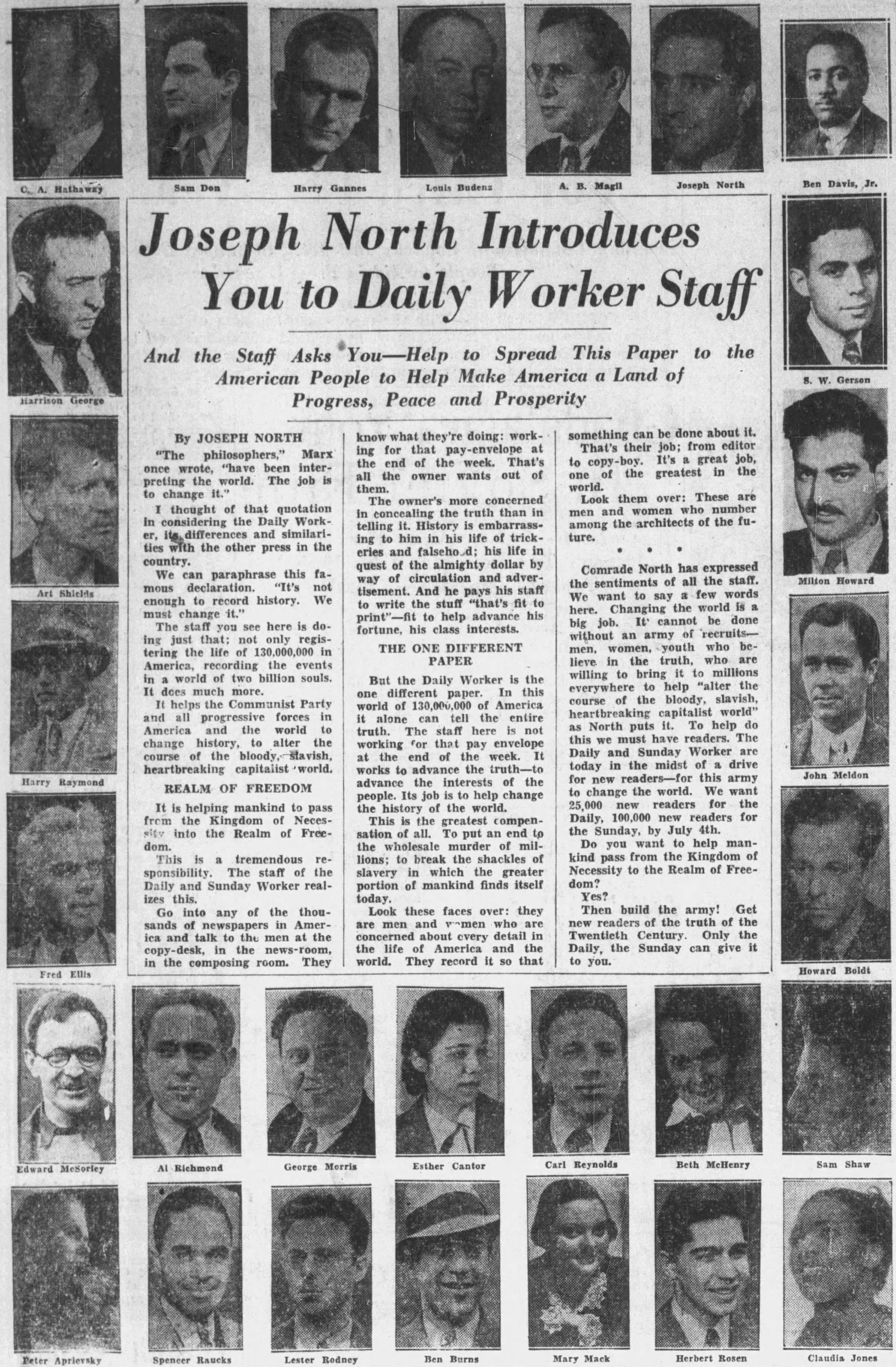
Burns (bottom row, center) among Daily Worker staff, May 1, 1937

Burns obtained work at the three Communist newspapers in the United States: in 1937 at the Daily Worker (New York), in 1938 at the Midwest Daily Record (Chicago) and in 1940 at People's World (San Francisco). With an income insufficient to support him, his wife and a prospective family, Burns and his wife decided it was time to move. By then, the FBI was tracking the couple. An FBI report dated April 17, 1941 noted: “Subjects leaving San Francisco for Chicago to be gone several years; future activities and intentions are unknown.”

=== Black publications ===
Back in Chicago, a political connection led Burns in July 1942 to apply for a job at the Chicago Defender, a leading black weekly newspaper. Hired as a temporary fill-in editor, he remained in that field for 35 years.

Burns's previous contacts with black people had been “practically nonexistent,” but he threw himself into his new work with gusto. “Having committed myself wholly to Negroes' attainment of fair and equal status … I endeavored to become in every sense a 'brother' by virtue of my oneness with Negroes in values and customs, interests and concerns, reactions and resolutions,” he wrote. “I became a Defender editor, a 'black newspaperman,' black in my orientation and thinking, in my concerns and outlook, in my friends and associations, black in everything but my skin color.”

After a stint in the U.S. Merchant Marine in 1943, Burns became, during the ensuing decades, the only Jewish editor-in-chief of a black daily (the Chicago Daily Defender, converted to a daily in 1956); the founding editor of Negro Digest (serving as editor from 1942 to 1954); the founding (and only Jewish) editor of Ebony (1945–54); the founding editor of Duke (1957, “a black version of Playboy”); the founding editor of Jet (1950–54), the editor of Tan Confessions (founded 1950), the editor of Sepia (1955–58, 1968–77) and the editor of Guns (1956–58). In 1952, the Chicago Defender was the second-largest circulation weekly black newspaper in the United States (circulation: 155,074). Ebony was the largest circulation monthly black magazine (379,000), followed by Tan Confessions (200,000).

During this time, Burns worked often with John H. Johnson, who became a wealthy African-American publisher. “My communist and Defender training in protest proved a source of continual acrimony between Johnson and me for almost all the years I worked for him,” Burns wrote. Burns contrasted the “flame of racial militancy kindled in me” with what he characterized as Johnson's “carefully calibrated racial positivism.”

=== Later career ===
Burns was fired from the Johnson Publishing Company in 1954. Johnson stated that Burns allowed too many sensational stories to get into Ebony, a charge Burns refuted. Leaving journalism, he entered public relations, partnering as a vice president from 1958 to 1966 in the public relations firm of Cooper, Burns & Golin (later Golin Harris). In 1957, he obtained work from Ray Kroc, the head of a relatively new company called McDonald's. In the following year, to earn a living he edited five non-black monthlies.

He later returned to serve as editor of the Chicago Daily Defender (1962–67) and Sepia (1968–77). Burns retired from journalism and public relations in 1977, and immediately traveled to Africa with his wife.

== Relationship to Judaism ==
Although Burns's paternal grandfather had been a scribe (sofer) and thus had been part of a religious Jewish family in Poland, Alexander Burns had rebelled against his upbringing. “My father,” Burns recalled, “had carried Marx's doctrine to the ultimate in his belief that 'religion was the cyanide rather than the opiate of the people.' And so I was brought up.” Burns was a self-described atheist who had “been in a synagogue but a half-dozen times as a sightseer.”

Burns began using the byline “Ben Burns” (instead of his birth surname Bernstein) around 1936, because at the time he was having difficulty finding a job in the journalism field and he thought that “perhaps a non-Jewish name would change my fortunes.” Yet during his long career in black journalism, he did not avoid being identified as a Jew. On one occasion, a printing salesman asked if he was “Negro or White?” Cognizant of his “dark complexion,” Burns replied: “Neither, I'm Jewish.” Commenting on his experiences of black anti-Semitism at Ebony, he noted how photographer David Jackson once returned disappointed from an assignment because a person he was to photograph was “not colored" but "a kike” from “Jewtown” (that is, the Maxwell Street area of Chicago). Taken aback by the remark, Burns asked Jackson what a “kike” is supposed to look like, adding, “Do I look like a kike?” Jackson replied that he didn't know, and Burns said, “Well, I am a kike.”

In 1973, Burns and his wife visited his parents' birthplaces in Poland, as well as the death camp Auschwitz. His account of the trip, which included criticism of religious authorities in Israel, was not published until 1996. In his later years, he rebuked the “black anti-Semitism” of Louis Farrakhan and was critical of the Holocaust denial of Arthur Butz.

== Controversies ==
=== Legacy ===
Some observers question Burns's place in black journalism. “Does Burns take too much credit for the seemingly substantial work he did on Negro Digest and Ebony? I don't know,” wrote one critic. “If the reader doesn't know the Black press well enough, it would be easy to accuse Burns of racial condescension.”

Burns wrote that he “single-handedly” put together the first issue of Negro Digest, which he states was the idea of John H. Johnson. Johnson hardly mentions Burns in his autobiography. Burns noted that Johnson “in later years … embellished his personal success story by claiming to have edited the Digest.”

=== Richard Wright ===
During the 1950s, Burns had a disagreement with Richard Wright, a long-time friend, over an article by Wright on “the Shame of Chicago,” about the plight of the local black community, which had been submitted for publication to Ebony. Burns wanted to publish the article, but Ebony's publisher, John H. Johnson, was against it. Johnson would only agree to publish Wright's article if, in order to appease advertisers, Burns would write an editorial publicly denouncing the article, which he did. Later, another similar piece by Wright, solicited by Burns, was rejected by Johnson. After Wright's death, some critics claimed Burns was in a “continuing feud” with Wright, and accused him of “skullduggery”; Burns defended his actions in his memoir.

== Recognition and influence ==
A statement of Burns's influence appeared in the Chicago Defender obituary, which stated that Burns “pioneered in creating and editing the first commercially successful African American magazines and was the former editor in chief of the Chicago Defender who trained many Black writers in all phases of print journalism.” The documentary record he accumulated during those years, and later donated to the Chicago Public Library, is a “gold mine” of information on the history of black journalism. “For students of African American history and Black journalism,” the Defender editorial stated in reference to the Burns papers, “it is a collection that demands to be seen.”

In 1997, Burns was named to the Hall of Achievement at Northwestern University's Medill School of Journalism.

== Works ==
- Nitty Gritty: A White Editor in Black Journalism (1996)
- The Best of Negro Humor, edited by John Harold Johnson and Ben Burns; intro. Langston Hughes (1945)
