= Hal Buell =

American photographer (1931/1932 – 2024)

Hal Buell (1931/1932 – 29 January 2024) was an American photographer who was the head of the Photography Service (photography director) at the Associated Press for twenty-five years where he supervised an international staff of 300 photographers. He was also the author of Moments: The Pulitzer Prize-Winning Photographs and Uncommon Valor, Common Virtue, a book about war photographer Joe Rosenthal.

== Education ==
Buell was a graduate of the Medill School of Journalism at Northwestern University.

== Career ==
Buell worked in photojournalism for 40 years. He is known as one of the most active archivists of the twentieth and twenty first century and has lectured throughout the world. His editing work has helped define print coverage around the world. Buell also published a number of children's photo books on Japan and Asia after living there on assignment in the 1960s. He worked in more than 35 countries. Photographs taken by others and edited by Buell have appeared on CNN and BBC. He also produced film documentaries which have appeared on the History Channel.

== Death ==
Buell died of pneumonia in Sunnyvale, California, on 29 January 2024, at the age of 92.
