= Katie Rogers (journalist) =

American journalist

- Born: Indiana, U.S.
- Occupation: Journalist
- Years active: 2014–present
- Employer: The New York Times
- Children: 1

Katie Rogers is an American journalist. She is the White House correspondent for The New York Times, covering the Trump administration.

She has worked for The New York Times since 2014, previously covering White House affairs under the Biden administration. She lives in Washington, D.C. with her husband and daughter. Rogers is the author of the 2024 book, American Woman about the roles of the first lady.

On November 25, 2025, The New York Times published an article co-written by Rogers and Dylan Freedman which analyzed 79-year-old President Donald Trump's reduced schedule compared to his first term as president amid concerns about his age and health. The article mentions Trump's public appearances falling between 12 noon and 5pm, Trump appearing drowsy in the Oval Office, and the visible bruising on his hand. In response to the article, the White House added Rogers to its list of "media offenders" for what it called a "blatant attempt to undermine President Trump". Trump called Rogers "a third rate reporter who is ugly, both inside and out" in a Truth Social post on November 26.
