= Bryan West (journalist) =

American Taylor Swift reporter

- Born: 1987 or 1988 (age 37–38)
- Education: Medill School of Journalism
- Occupation: Journalist
- Employer: Gannett
- Website: bryanwesttv.com

Bryan West (born 1987 or 1988) is an American journalist who works as a dedicated Taylor Swift reporter for the newspaper company Gannett, mainly working for The Tennessean and USA Today.

== Early life ==
West is from Arizona. In 2008, he transferred from Gonzaga University to the Medill School of Journalism at Northwestern University.

== Career ==
While studying at the Medill School of Journalism, West reported for the Northwestern News Network and interned at The Today Show and NBC News. He went on to work as a broadcast news reporter and producer for eight years at KPNX in Phoenix, Arizona. In 2014, he was awarded the Alfred I. duPont–Columbia University Award for investigative journalism for an investigation into firefighters who had falsely testified in arson cases. He also won two Emmys during this time.

=== Taylor Swift reporter for Gannett ===
West was announced as Gannett's first ever dedicated Taylor Swift reporter on November 6, 2023, with Variety breaking the news. The two-month search for the role made headlines when it began publicly on September 12, followed by a similar request for a Beyoncé reporter. Applicants had included an established White House reporter as well as several fans of Swift. West had stated 13 reasons why he should be hired in his video application, including his journalism experience, the fact that he had already met Swift through his work on the opening night of the 2018 Reputation Stadium Tour, and that he was able to report without bias, listing "It's Nice to Have a Friend", "Stay Stay Stay," and "False God" as songs he disliked. He moved to Nashville for the job.

West received criticism from fans of Swift and newspaper watchdogs; he had described himself in his Variety interview as "a fan of Taylor," leading journalists to question whether he would be unbiased in his reporting, while fans debated whether West was a big enough fan himself. Others suggested that a woman would have been better suited to the role. Lark-Marie Antón, the chief communications officer of Gannett, responded to the criticism in an email by stating that "Haters gonna hate" (a lyric from Swift's "Shake It Off") and that West's experience "made him the best candidate for this role."

== Personal life ==
West has been sober since 2018. He has discussed his struggles with alcoholism and depression, stating that he "uncovered a deeper affinity for Swift's music during his recovery". He is a licensed drone pilot.
