= BURN-E =

2008 American animated short film

- BURN-E poster
- Directed by: Angus MacLane
- Written by: Andrew Stanton; Angus MacLane; Derek Thompson
- Produced by: Galyn Susman
- Starring: Angus MacLane; Tessa Swigart; Ben Burtt; Elissa Knight; Jeff Garlin; MacInTalk
- Edited by: Steve Bloom
- Music by: J. A. C. Redford
- Production company: Pixar Animation Studios
- Distributed by: Walt Disney Studios Home Entertainment
- Release dates: November 18, 2008 (with WALL-E Blu-ray and DVD)
- Running time: 7:36
- Country: United States
- Language: English

BURN-E (stylized with an interpunct as BURN·E) is a 2008 American animated short film produced by Pixar Animation Studios. It is tied into and included with the DVD and Blu-ray of WALL-E. The titular repair robot is a minor character from the film, who spends the short trying to repair a small part of the starship Axiom, only to be continuously thwarted by concurrent events seen in intercut scenes from WALL-E. WALL-E's director Andrew Stanton co-wrote and executive produced the short.

BURN-E was produced at the same time as WALL-E and directed by the feature film's lead animator, Angus MacLane. It features music composed and conducted by J. A. C. Redford, who was also an orchestrator on WALL-E.

The BURN-E robot appears briefly in WALL-E during the scene in which WALL-E and EVE dance in space. When they re-enter the Axiom, they accidentally lock him out, and he is last seen banging his fists against the door.

== Plot ==
As WALL-E travels through space clinging to the ship carrying EVE back to the Axiom starliner, (Note: As depicted in WALL-E (2008)) he runs his hand through the Rings of Saturn in passing, and dislodges a tiny rock. It gains enough momentum to become a meteor and crashes into and destroys one of the running lights (known as "spires") on the Axiom's hull.

The Axiom's computer alerts the ship's autopilot, AUTO, that repairs are needed. AUTO activates SUPPLY-R (Spare Ultra Plottic Pandron Yorth Ranger), who in turn activates BURN-E (Basic Utility Repair Nano Engineer). Given his welding torch and an intact spire, he shuts down the broken spire, and travels via a special track onto the ship's hull to complete the repair. However, he gets distracted by WALL-E's arrival, and inadvertently lets the spire float away into space. SUPPLY-R gives him a second one, but he accidentally cuts it in half when an exploding escape pod (which WALL-E was inside of) startles him.

Irritated by this second failure, SUPPLY-R drops the third and final spare light on the floor, leaving BURN-E to pick it up. He successfully repairs the light, but before he can bring it online, he is accidentally locked out by WALL-E and EVE, who fly inside after their dance in space around the Axiom and close the door behind them.

BURN-E tries to find another way in, including through the open garbage airlock, but the door is closed by a WALL-A (Waste Allocation Load Lifter: Axiom-class) unit before BURN-E can reenter. Finally, he realizes he can use his welding torch to cut a new entrance in the hull of the Axiom, and does so. However, he is flung back outside when a fight between Captain B. McCrea and AUTO causes the ship to list violently to starboard. He catches hold of the spire, and is able to get back on his track as the ship turns upright again, but EVE inserts the plant into the Holo-Detector, which sends the Axiom into a hyperjump, pinning BURN-E against the hull before he can reenter the ship.

When the Axiom lands on Earth, BURN-E goes to find SUPPLY-R so he can hit the button to bring the spire back online, but everyone is gone. He hunts through the deserted Axiom, and finds the humans and robots are all outside when he looks through the window of an escape pod. He accidentally jettisons the pod, and crashes to Earth; flinging the pod door open so hard that it flies into the air, he runs to SUPPLY-R and finally brings the spire online, only for the door to destroy it, and BURN-E collapses in frustration.

After the credits, SUPPLY-R tries to comfort him.

== Cast ==
- Angus MacLane as BURN-E/SUPPLY-R
- Tessa Swigart as Maintenance Computer Voice
- Ben Burtt as WALL-E (uncredited)
- Elissa Knight as EVE (uncredited)
- Jeff Garlin as Captain B. McCrea (uncredited)
- MacInTalk as AUTO (uncredited)
