= Angus MacLane =

American animator (born 1975)

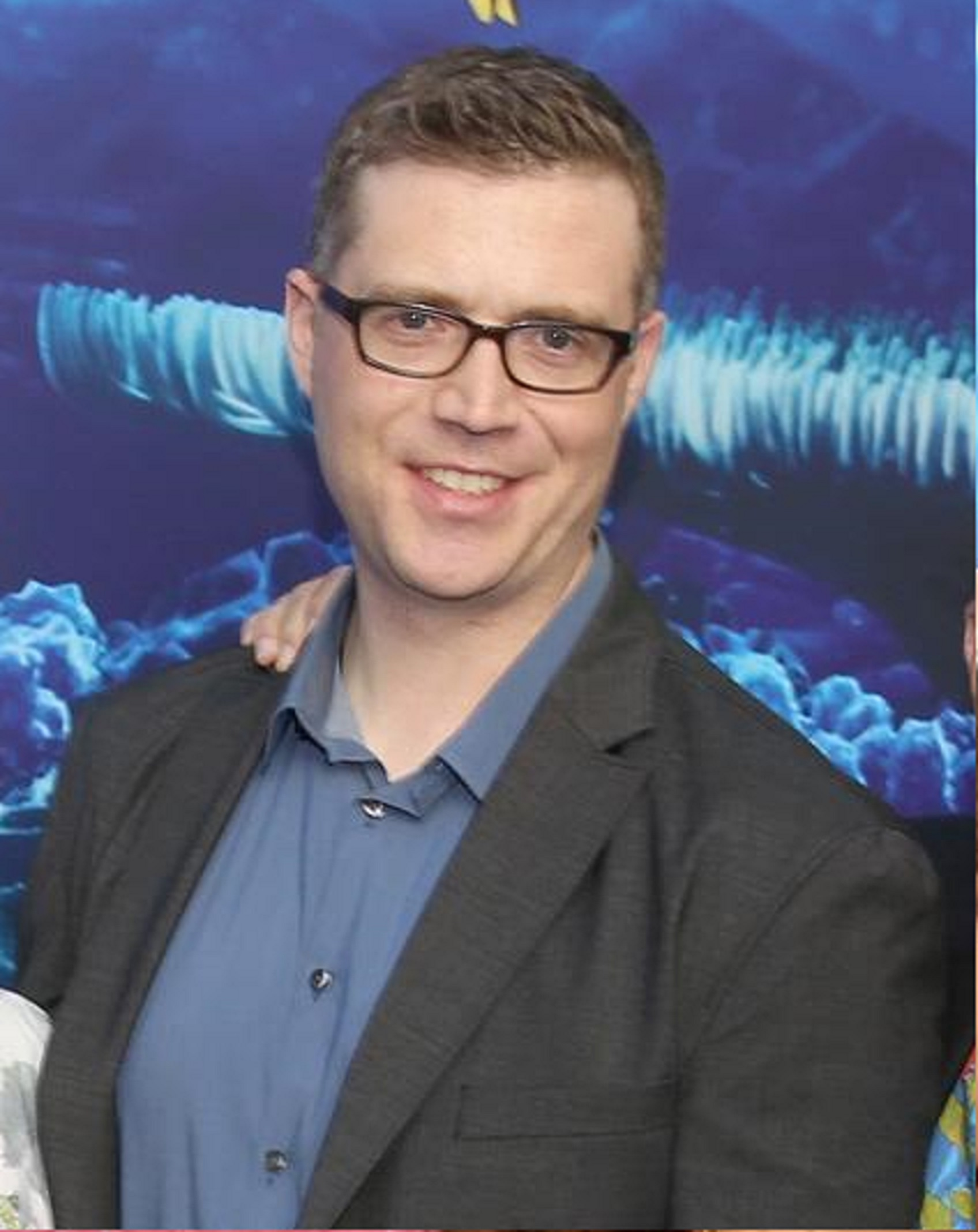
- MacLane in 2016
- Born: Angus Tyler MacLane; April 13, 1975 (age 51); Riverside County, California, U.S.
- Education: Rhode Island School of Design (BFA)
- Occupations: Animator; screenwriter; director; voice actor
- Years active: 1997–present
- Employer: Pixar Animation Studios (1997–2023)

Angus MacLane (born April 13, 1975) is an American animator, filmmaker and voice actor, best known for his work at Pixar Animation Studios. He co-directed the film Finding Dory (2016) and made his solo feature directorial debut with the Toy Story spin-off film Lightyear (2022). MacLane is also a Lego enthusiast and created the CubeDudes building format and designed a LEGO WALL-E that has become an official set from The Lego Group.

== Early life and education ==
Angus MacLane (born Angus Tyler MacLane), was born on April 13, 1975, in Riverside County, California, but grew up in Portland, Oregon. His father, Don MacLane was credited for "Math" in the film directed by his son, Lightyear, where he calculated the course-correction math the titular character used on his first test flight. (Note: His name was confirmed on the end credits of the film.) He originally wanted to be a comic book artist but halfway through school switched to animation and hoped one day he could work at the Will Vinton Studios (now Laika) and would eventually go on to work for the studio before working for Pixar. In 1997, he received a bachelor of fine arts from Rhode Island School of Design.

== Career ==
=== 1997–2023: Pixar ===
MacLane joined Pixar in 1997, starting as an animator on the short film Geri's Game. He worked as an animator on every Pixar feature film from A Bug's Life (1998) through Toy Story 3 (2010). He also worked in the character development on Monsters, Inc. (2001) and The Incredibles (2004).

After serving as a supervising animator on One Man Band, MacLane started working on the story team for Andrew Stanton's WALL-E before moving up to directing animator. After animating a small scene for a side character named BURN-E, MacLane was intrigued to learn what might happen to the character. This led to the development of a short film for the film's home media release, titled BURN-E, which became his first directing credit at Pixar.

In the following years, MacLane continued to direct for the studio, being in charge of the Toy Story Toons short film Small Fry (2011) and the television special Toy Story of Terror! (2013). In June 2014, it was announced he would work again with Stanton as co-director on Finding Dory (2016).

In December 2020, it was announced he would write and direct Lightyear, a Toy Story spin-off centered on the character the toy is based upon. His feature directorial debut, the film was billed as a passion project inspired by his love of science fiction films. The film was released in June 2022 to generally positive reactions but becoming a box-office bomb, which in turn lost the studio an estimated $106 million.

MacLane was one of 75 Pixar employees laid off by The Walt Disney Company as part of an ongoing company-wide restructuring in May 2023.

=== Further projects ===
In November 2025, it was reported that MacLane was developing a new film titled Trudy Blue, with Dakota Johnson attached in the leading role.

== Filmography ==
=== Films ===
Year	Title	Director	Writer	Animator	Story Artist	Character Developer	Production Artist	Other	Voice Role	Notes
1998	A Bug's Life	No	No	Additional	No	No	No	No		
1999	Toy Story 2	No	No	Yes	Additional	No	No	No		
2000	Buzz Lightyear of Star Command: The Adventure Begins	Partial	No	No	No	No	No	No		Directed Pixar CG opening scene direct-to-video
2001	Monsters, Inc.	No	No	Yes	Additional	Yes	No	No		
2003	Finding Nemo	No	No	Yes	No	No	No	No		
2004	The Incredibles	No	No	Yes	No	Animation	No	No		
2006	Cars	No	No	Additional	No	No	No	No		
2007	Ratatouille	No	No	Additional	No	No	No	No		
2008	WALL-E	No	No	Directing	Yes	No	Yes	Yes	BURN-E (uncredited)	
2009	Up	No	No	Yes	No	No	No	No		
2010	Toy Story 3	No	No	Yes	No	Animation	No	No		
2016	Finding Dory	Co-Director	No	No	No	No	No	Yes	Sunfish "Charlie Back and Forth" / Additional Voices	Additional Story Material
2017	Coco	No	No	No	No	No	No	Yes		Pixar Senior Creative Team
2018	Incredibles 2	No	No	No	No	No	No	Yes		Pixar Senior Creative Team
2019	Toy Story 4	No	No	No	No	No	No	Yes		Pixar Senior Creative Team
2020	Onward	No	No	No	No	No	No	Yes		Pixar Senior Creative Team
2020	Soul	No	No	No	No	No	No	Yes		Pixar Senior Creative Team
2021	Luca	No	No	No	No	No	No	Yes		Pixar Senior Creative Team
2022	Turning Red	No	No	No	No	No	No	Yes		Pixar Senior Creative Team
2022	Lightyear	Yes	Yes	No	No	No	No	Yes	ERIC / DERIC / Zyclops	Pixar Senior Creative Team
2023	Elemental	No	No	No	No	No	No	Yes		Pixar Senior Creative Team
2026	Hoppers	No	No	No	No	No	No	Yes		Special Thanks

==== Shorts ====
Year	Title	Director	Writer	Animator	Executive Producer	Other	Voice Role	Notes
1997	Geri's Game	No	No	Yes	No	No		
2000	For the Birds	No	No	Yes	No	No		
2005	One Man Band	No	No	Supervising	No	No		
2008	BURN-E	Yes	Yes	No	No	Yes	BURN-E / SUPPLY-R	
2010	Cars Toons: Mater's Tall Tales	No	No	No	No	Yes	Additional Voices	Episodes 8–9
2011	Toy Story Toons: Hawaiian Vacation	No	No	Supervising	No	Yes	Captain Zip	
2011	Toy Story Toons: Small Fry	Yes	Yes	No	No	Yes	Gary Grappling Hook / T-Bone / Funky Monk / Super Pirate	
2012	Toy Story Toons: Partysaurus Rex	No	No	No	No	Yes	Additional Voices	Special Thanks
2013	Party Central	No	No	No	No	Yes		Special Thanks
2016	Marine Life Interviews	No	No	No	Yes	No		
2017	Lou	No	No	No	No	Yes		Special Thanks
2019	Purl	No	No	No	No	Yes		Special Thanks
2022	Cars on the Road	No	No	No	No	Yes		Pixar Senior Creative Team

==== Television ====
Year	Title	Director	Writer	Other	Voice Role	Notes
2000–01	Buzz Lightyear of Star Command	Partial	No	No		Directed Pixar CG intro variants
2013	Toy Story of Terror!	Yes	Yes	Yes	Officer Wilson	TV special
2025	Win or Lose	No	No	Yes		Pixar Senior Creative Team

==== Other credits ====
Year	Title	Role	Notes
2005	The Making of 'The Incredibles'	Himself	DVD Extra
2009	Tracy	Waiter / Actor #9	
2021	Pixar 2021 Disney+ Day Special	Himself	Disney+ Original specials
2022	Beyond Infinity: Buzz and the Journey to 'Lightyear'	Himself	Disney+ Original specials

== Recognition ==
- 2005, Won Annie Award for 'Character Animation' for The Incredibles
- 2014, Won Annie Award for 'Outstanding Achievement in Directing' for Toy Story of Terror
