= Lightyear (film) =

2022 film by Angus MacLane

- Theatrical release poster
- Directed by: Angus MacLane
- Screenplay by: Jason Headley; Angus MacLane
- Story by: Angus MacLane; Matthew Aldrich; Jason Headley
- Produced by: Galyn Susman
- Starring: Chris Evans; Keke Palmer; Peter Sohn; Taika Waititi; Dale Soules; James Brolin; Uzo Aduba
- Cinematography: Jeremy Lasky (camera); Ian Megibben (lighting)
- Edited by: Anthony J. Greenberg
- Music by: Michael Giacchino
- Production company: Pixar Animation Studios
- Distributed by: Walt Disney Studios; Motion Pictures (Note: Distributed under the Walt Disney Pictures banner.)
- Release dates: June 8, 2022 (El Capitan Theatre); June 17, 2022 (United States)
- Running time: 105 minutes
- Country: United States
- Language: English
- Budget: $200 million
- Box office: $226.4 million

Lightyear is a 2022 American animated science fiction action film produced by Pixar Animation Studios for Walt Disney Pictures, and starring Chris Evans as the voice of Buzz Lightyear. Presented as a film within a film, Lightyear is a spin-off of the Toy Story film series and centers on the character Buzz Lightyear, who appears in Toy Story as an action figure of his character in Lightyear. The film was directed by Angus MacLane and written by MacLane and Jason Headley. Besides Evans, Keke Palmer, Peter Sohn, Taika Waititi, Dale Soules, James Brolin, and Uzo Aduba voice supporting roles. The film follows Buzz who, after being marooned on the hostile planet T'Kani Prime with his commander and crew, tries to find a way back home while encountering a threat to their safety.

The concept of a human Buzz Lightyear, who exists in a fictional universe within a fictional universe, was first introduced in the 2000 direct-to-video film Buzz Lightyear of Star Command: The Adventure Begins, which was the pilot for the TV series Buzz Lightyear of Star Command (2000–2001). MacLane, an avid science-fiction fan, pitched the idea of a film featuring Buzz Lightyear at Pixar, after finishing work on Finding Dory (2016). The project was officially announced in an investor meeting held by Disney in December 2020. The animators gave the film a "cinematic" and "chunky" look, evoking the science-fiction films MacLane grew up watching. To design the vehicles of the film, MacLane used Lego pieces to build various ships and pitch them to the designers and artists. For its IMAX scenes, the team used two virtual cameras, a regular camera with a 35mm equivalent sensor, and a larger sensor equivalent to 65 millimeters, a procedure earlier initiated by Pixar in WALL-E (2008). Development on Lightyear lasted for five and a half years. Michael Giacchino composed the film's score, while Ren Klyce served as its sound designer.

Lightyear premiered at the El Capitan Theatre in Hollywood, Los Angeles, on June 8, 2022, and was theatrically released in the United States on June 17. It became the first Pixar film to be released in theaters worldwide since Onward in March 2020, and the first to include scenes specifically formatted for IMAX theaters. The film received generally positive reviews from critics and was considered by analysts to be a box-office bomb, as it grossed $226.4 million worldwide against an approximate $200 million budget, losing the studio an estimated $106 million.

== Plot ==
"In 1995, a boy named Andy got a Buzz Lightyear toy for his birthday. It was from his favorite movie. This is that movie."

— The statement that opens the film, clarifying Lightyear to be a film within a film of the Toy Story franchise.

A Star Command exploration vessel filled with hypersleeping personnel changes course to investigate signs of life on the unknown world T'Kani Prime. Awakened from hibernation by the ship AI, Space Ranger Buzz Lightyear and his commanding officer and best friend Alisha Hawthorne explore the planet with a new recruit in tow. They are forced to retreat to their exploration vessel after discovering that the planet hosts hostile lifeforms. While attempting to leave, Buzz accidentally damages their vessel, causing them and their many shipmates to be marooned on T'Kani Prime. After surveying the damage, they find that the fuel for the ship was destroyed. Buzz volunteers to be the test pilot for the hyperspace fuel crystal they will need to develop to power the ship home.

One year later, the crew has constructed a colony to extract resources from the planet and conduct repairs. However, after a four-minute test flight, Buzz finds that four years have passed on T'Kani Prime due to the effects of time dilation from travelling at relativistic speeds. Alisha gifts Buzz with Sox, a robotic feline companion, and Buzz decides to continue testing the hyperspace fuel. With every test, four more years pass on T'Kani Prime, until eventually over 66 years have passed. During this time, the colony develops, with Alisha raising a son with her wife Kiko, subsequently dying of old age, while Sox improves the fuel's composition, allowing the ship to obtain faster-than-light speeds.

Against the orders of Alisha's successor Commander Cal Burnside, Buzz, accompanied by Sox, uses the new fuel composition for a successful hyperspace test. However, he and Sox skip 22 years into the future during which T'Kani Prime has been invaded by Zyclops robots led by Zurg, the robots' commander. Buzz and Sox meet up with members of the colony's defense forces: Alisha's now-adult granddaughter Izzy Hawthorne; Mo Morrison, a fresh, naïve recruit; and Darby Steel, an elderly paroled convict. While initially reluctant to work with them, Buzz eventually warms to them after they escape from a nest of insects and investigate a mining facility to repair their ship. Together, they plan to destroy the invading force at Zurg's mothership.

As they head back to the ship, Zurg intervenes and captures Buzz, then reveals himself to be an older version of Buzz from an alternate timeline, which split upon Buzz's return to the planet after the successful hyperspace test: soldiers from the colony attempted to arrest him under Burnside's orders, forcing him to flee into space. This Buzz and his Sox escaped at full speed and, via time dilation, flew hundreds of years into the far future, where he encountered and stole extremely advanced technology, and eventually developed a way to travel back in time to prevent himself from stranding the Star Command crew upon the planet. Having worn out his own fuel, Zurg needs fresh fuel to travel further into the past and complete his mission, so he requests it from his younger self. Realizing this would erase Alisha and Kiko's life together, along with Izzy and the lives of all the other colonists, Buzz refuses.

Aided by Zurg's Sox, Buzz and the cadets escape Zurg's ship and set it to self-destruct. On their return to the planet via a crash landing, Zurg attacks and takes the fuel for himself. Buzz ejects to shoot the fuel, causing an explosion that seemingly kills Zurg. With the fuel gone, Buzz finally accepts T'Kani Prime as his home. Burnside arrests the group with the intention of detaining them for their actions, but relents in light of Buzz's bravery against the robot armada. Allowed to revive the Space Ranger Corps, Buzz selects Izzy, Mo, Darby, and Sox as his team. With a new fuel crystal, Buzz and his team embark on a mission to investigate an unknown signal from the Gamma Quadrant of sector 4. Elsewhere, Zurg is shown to have survived the explosion.

== Voice cast ==
- Chris Evans as Buzz Lightyear, a young test pilot and Space Ranger who explores the uncharted planet called T'Kani Prime.
- Keke Palmer as Izzy Hawthorne, Alisha's granddaughter who fights in the colony's defense forces with Buzz against Zurg. Keira Hairston as a young version of Izzy.
- Peter Sohn as Sox, a robotic cat who acts as Buzz's companion. Sohn also voices an older, worn-out version of Sox used by Zurg.
- Taika Waititi as Mo Morrison, a fresh, naive recruit in the colonial defense forces.
- Dale Soules as Darby Steel, an elderly woman and recruit for the colonial defense forces who is currently on parole for shipjacking.
- James Brolin as Buzz Lightyear / Zurg, the commander of the invading robotic army who is later revealed to be an elderly, nihilistic version of himself from an alternate timeline.
- Uzo Aduba as Alisha Hawthorne, Buzz's best friend, commanding officer and Kiko's wife, who is one of Izzy's grandmothers.
- Mary McDonald-Lewis as I.V.A.N., a voice-activated virtual assistant and auto-pilot.
- Isiah Whitlock Jr. as Commander Calvin "Cal" Burnside, the officer who succeeds Alisha Hawthorne after she dies of old age.
- Angus MacLane as:
  - ERIC
  - DERIC, a robot that works with Izzy.
  - Zyclops, the robotic foot soldiers of Zurg.
- Bill Hader as Benny Featheringhamstan / The Rookie, a new recruit partnered with Buzz and Alisha.
- Efren Ramirez as Airman Diaz, an acquaintance of Buzz.

Additionally, Tim Peake appears in an uncredited cameo as a worker at the mission control center.

== Production ==
=== Development ===
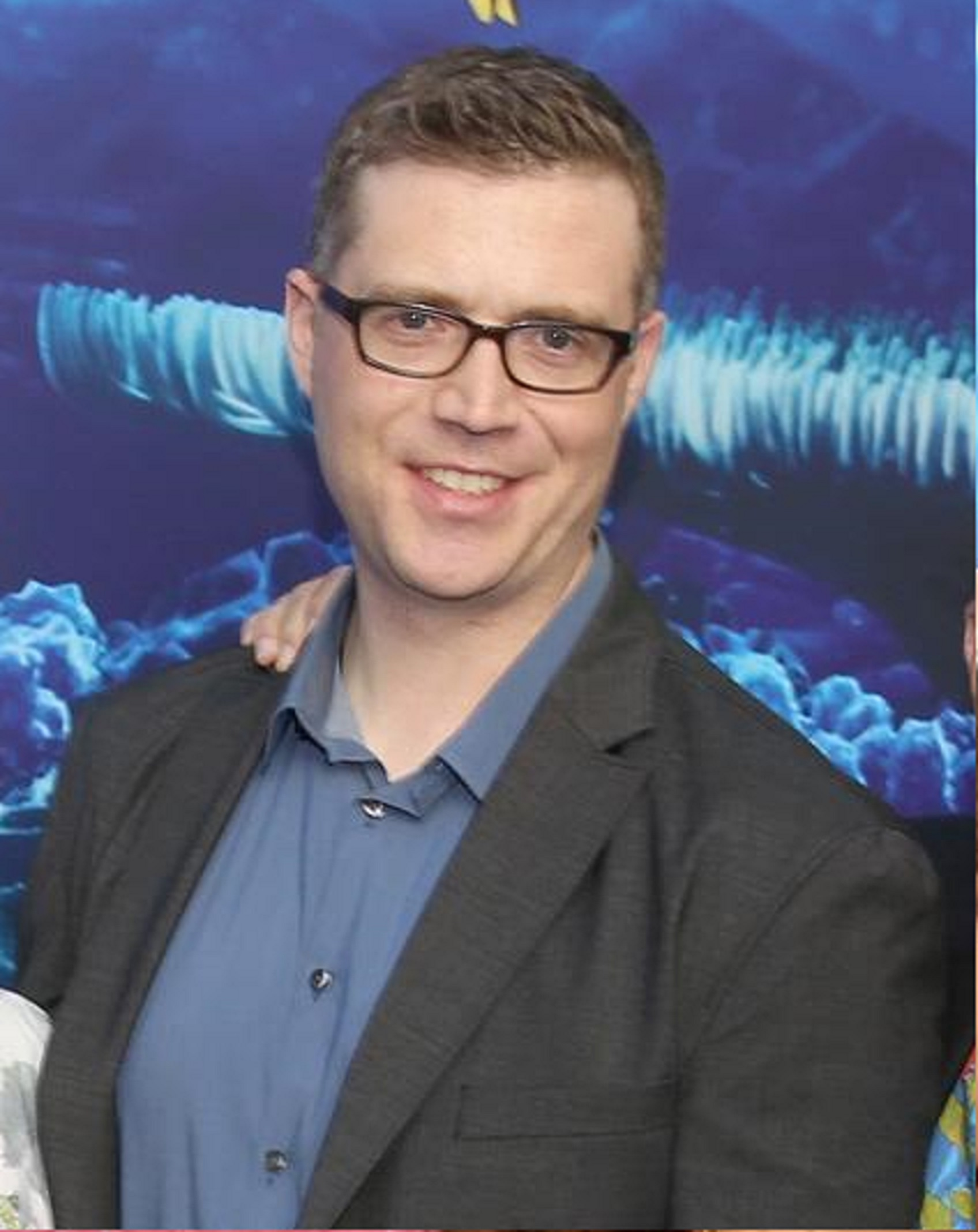
Director Angus MacLane

Development of Lightyear began following the production of Finding Dory in 2016. After co-directing Finding Dory with Andrew Stanton, Angus MacLane was allowed to pitch the idea of making a Buzz Lightyear film, having always wondered what movie Andy Davis saw in the original Toy Story (1995) to get interested in a Buzz Lightyear action figure. MacLane, a science fiction fan, had felt attracted to the character of Buzz since he started working at Pixar, feeling that the film's story was very "personal" for him, whose favorite movie since childhood had been Star Wars (1977). An aspect present in the Toy Story films that Lightyear explores is Buzz's disagreement over the nature of reality, which, coupled with his heroic ideals, made an amalgam of sci-fi clichés that MacLane intended to make more than just a punchline.

In February 2019, Tim Allen, who voiced Buzz in the films, expressed interest in doing another film as he did not "see any reason why they wouldn't do it", while in that May, on The Ellen DeGeneres Show, Tom Hanks, who voiced Woody, said that Toy Story 4 (2019) would be the final installment in the franchise, but producer Mark Nielsen disclosed a possibility of a fifth film, as Pixar was not ruling out that possibility. In December 2020 at a Disney Investor Day meeting, Lightyear was announced as a spin-off film depicting the in-universe origin of the human Buzz Lightyear character, with Chris Evans providing the character's voice.

When asked about the relationship between Lightyear and Buzz Lightyear of Star Command, a Toy Story spin-off series that also serves as an in-universe production starring the Buzz character, MacLane, who directed the CG opening sequence for Star Command, said that he did not have it in mind while working on the film, but always pictured the series being developed in-universe after a trilogy of Lightyear films. He later explained that Lightyear serves as a "live-action" film within the Toy Story universe, whereas Star Command serves as a hand-drawn animated series based on the film, from which the toy versions of Buzz and Zurg derive. On May 4, 2022, production of Lightyear was completed after spending five and a half years in development. The budget was approximately $200 million.

=== Casting ===
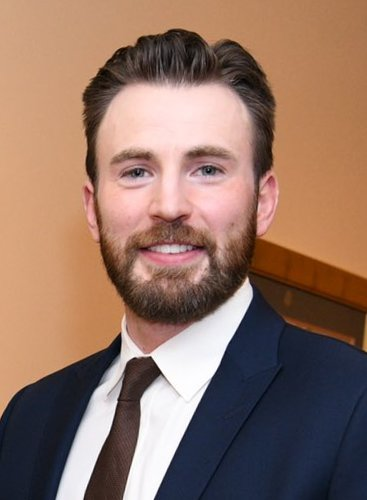
Chris Evans voices Buzz Lightyear in the film.

Producer Galyn Susman said that the creative team did not discuss bringing back the original voice actor for Buzz Lightyear, Tim Allen, in any capacity for this film because they believed that his voice would have tied the film too closely to Toy Story when the film aims to be its own stand-alone story while also saying: "Tim really is the embodiment of the toy Buzz, and this isn't the toy world, so it really doesn't make sense. There's not really a role. It would just cause more confusion for audiences instead of helping them understand the movie we're trying to tell."

Chris Evans was announced as the voice of the human Buzz Lightyear along with the project's announcement in December 2020. Evans was the first and only choice MacLane had for Buzz; MacLane defended the recasting as "Tim's version of Buzz [Lightyear] is a little goofier and is a little dumber, and so he is the comic relief. In this film, Buzz is the action hero. He's serious and ambitious and funny, but not in a goofy way that would undercut the drama [...] Chris Evans has the gravitas and that movie-star quality that our character needed to separate him and the movie from Tim's version of the toy in Toy Story."

Evans visited Pixar's offices one day and they pitched him the project during a visit; he accepted the offer immediately, given his love for animation. Evans credited Allen as his guideline and also wanted to "create his own understanding of the character, and try to make some fresh tracks in the snow while paying homage to his work in the film". He eventually felt comfortable with his own interpretation and had to lower his voice for the role.

Keke Palmer, Dale Soules, Uzo Aduba, James Brolin, Mary McDonald-Lewis, Efren Ramirez and Isiah Whitlock Jr. were reported to have been cast in supporting roles in February 2022, following the release of the official trailer. On May 6, 2022, European Space Agency astronaut Tim Peake was revealed to have a cameo as "Tim from Mission Control". On May 25, it was revealed that Formula One drivers Carlos Sainz Jr. and Charles Leclerc would cameo in the film; both playing the same undisclosed character for the Spanish and Italian dubs of the film, respectively.

=== Animation and design ===
The animators wanted the film to look "cinematic" and "chunky" in order to evoke the feeling of the science fiction films MacLane grew up with. In order to achieve this, they asked a former Industrial Light & Magic employee to build a spaceship model for them, from which the animators drew inspiration; this technique was inspired by designers for early science fiction films using models as inspiration for their sets and props. MacLane said the animation took several "visual lessons" from early science fiction and space opera films such as those of the Star Wars franchise, though without intentionally imitating such films. The visual effects studio Perception helped with the opening and end credits of the film. To design the vehicles of the film, MacLane used Lego pieces to build various ships and pitch them to the designers and artists. Zurg was redesigned for the film, influenced by anime robots, to look more grounded and menacing than his previous appearances which MacLane believed were too comical.

Korean animators Sung-uk Chun and Chaeyeon Lee worked on the animation process in their homes during the COVID-19 pandemic. They said that it is "overwhelming to see the full scale of what computer animation can do on the big screen". The animation team went to NASA to research about spaceships, space suits and overall set pieces as they wanted "everything to look like a live-action film rather than an animation". According to Lee, a 3D animator, who also worked on Toy Story 2 (1999) and 3 (2010), said "The director wanted to make a film that felt true so he asked for a much more toned-down version of Buzz's personality. Being part of the team required an enormous amount of responsibility, but it was really exciting for me professionally".

"If you're watching the film in a regular theater, you may not notice. But when you see the film in IMAX, those shots are actually shot "in IMAX," for lack of a better word [...] all of that stuff started back on WALL-E, and each film has kind of had its own version. Like, how do we want to shoot this film? What's the aspect ratio? What do we want the feel of it to be from the lens? And it all sounds like kind of small, little things. But they all add up.

— Jeremy Lasky, about the shooting of Lightyear in IMAX format.

For the IMAX release, Lightyear is the first ever animated feature film to have its aspect ratio opened up from 2.39:1 to 1.43:1 for select sequences of the film. Jane Yen, who served as the film's visual effects supervisor, spoke to /Film stating that the team had developed virtual IMAX cameras to shoot the sequences in 1.43:1 and then would be cropped to standard-definition. The film includes 30 minutes of IMAX animation. The team shot this footage using two different virtual cameras, a regular camera with a 35mm equivalent sensor and a 65mm equivalent sensor, which was earlier initiated by Pixar in WALL-E (2008).

== Music ==
Recurring Pixar composer Michael Giacchino was announced to compose the score for the film, marking his eighth collaboration with the studio and the second time he would score an installment to a film franchise from Pixar that is traditionally scored by Randy Newman, after Cars 2 (2011). He earlier scored for the Toy Story television specials: Toy Story of Terror! (2013) and Toy Story That Time Forgot (2014); the former was written and directed by MacLane.

== Marketing ==
Following the announcement of the film, a first look was shown at the Disney Investor Day on December 10, 2020. The marketing campaign for Lightyear began on October 27, 2021, with the release of a teaser trailer, set to David Bowie's "Starman", that received 83 million views in its first 24 hours. Compared to other Pixar films, the teaser's viewership ranks second behind a teaser for Incredibles 2 (114 million). It was positively reviewed by commentators, with CNN-based editor Leah Asmelash writing, "the trailer filled many millennials with sentimentality". The first trailer was released online on February 8, 2022, and was then aired at Super Bowl LVI on February 13, 2022. ComicBook.com's Aaron Perine opined that "the animated movie will be as comedic as expected of these family movies" and further stated "Chris Evans' version of the Space Ranger takes shape as he gets used to some alien surroundings. Also of note would be Lightyear's new companion, a robot cat that will also end up being comedic relief played by Peter Sohn." Aaron Couch of The Hollywood Reporter had stated "The Lightyear trailer reveals that Buzz is sent on a rescue flight after he and a group of people are stranded on a planet. After a year of hard work, they've managed to send Buzz off world for help."

On April 27, 2022, the first 30 minutes of the film was premiered at CinemaCon along with the second trailer, which released online six days earlier. It was positively received by critics, who referred to the film as "Pixar's Star Wars" and a "beautifully animated, fun, and emotional journey", and appreciated the cinematic qualities, including animation and visuals. Critics further went on to praise the robotic cat Sox voiced by Sohn, and called him "the standout performer." CNBC's Sarah Whitten compared Sox, with K-2SO from Rogue One (2016) and Baymax from Big Hero 6 (2014), attributing the character with a "dry sense of humor and blunt vocal delivery and also an innocence and caring nature". On May 5, 2022, a poster, stills from the film, and a "special look" trailer was released online.

Fandango Media's managing editor Erik Davis, and John Rocha, film critic for Outlaw Nation, predicted a demand for Sox toys, even before the film's release. Mattel, which had the master toy license for Toy Story franchise, had announced a new Lightyear toy line consisting of action figures, playsets and vehicles. After Sox's character in the film received praise from insiders, Mattel created "an animatronic interactive version" which costs $80, apart from the plush and action figures. Mattel's executive lead, PJ Lewis had said "We knew he was much more than a sidekick and offered multiple ways to drive product innovation for the 'Lightyear' line. Plus, we have a few cat people on the team who were smitten."

Lego released three sets based on scenes from the film, which were released on April 24, 2022. On May 29, 2022, Ferrari announced that Lightyear would be a sponsor on their cars starting at the 2022 Monaco Grand Prix. In addition, Charles Leclerc and Carlos Sainz Jr. would also be cast for roles in the film, respectively voicing for the Italian and Spanish versions. American food manufacturing company Lightlife, collaborated with Disney and Pixar for launching several food packages inspired from the film. It also planned for a sweepstake promotion, which enable customers to win several prizes, including private film screening and Disney merchandises. Singapore-based WE Cinemas announced the debut of "Lightyear Premium Pack" with refreshments marketed with stills and images from the film. A half-hour-long documentary featurette entitled Beyond Infinity: Buzz and the Journey to Lightyear was released on the Disney+ streaming service on June 10 in anticipation of the film's release, chronicling the conception and production of Lightyear.

== Release ==
=== Theatrical ===
Lightyear premiered at the El Capitan Theatre in Hollywood, Los Angeles, on June 8, 2022, and was theatrically released in the United States on June 17, 2022, by Walt Disney Studios Motion Pictures in RealD 3D, 4DX, Dolby Cinema, and IMAX formats. It is Pixar's first film since Onward (2020) to receive a theatrical release after Soul (2020), Luca (2021) and Turning Red (2022) were assigned direct-to-streaming releases on Disney+ in response to the closure of cinemas due to the COVID-19 pandemic. Lightyear also became Pixar's first film to have virtual IMAX cameras in its progress.

=== Ban and censorship ===
Lightyear was banned in the Muslim world (including Bahrain, Brunei, Egypt, Iraq, Jordan, Kazakhstan, Kuwait, Lebanon, Malaysia, Oman, Palestine, Qatar, Saudi Arabia, Syria, Tunisia, and the United Arab Emirates) due to a scene featuring a same-sex kiss between Uzo Aduba's female character Alisha Hawthorne and her partner Kiko. The People's Republic of China (PRC) also requested that the scene in question be removed; however Disney declined to make the cuts. Indonesia stated that they did not ban the film, "but suggested the owner of the movie think about their audience in Indonesia where an LGBT kissing scene is still considered sensitive." In Singapore, the scene resulted in the film being allowed only for people above 16 years of age (NC-16). Despite bans across most of the Arab world, Morocco refused to ban the film and showed it in cinemas, despite a petition requesting a ban on the film.

The specific scene was initially cut from the film in mid-March 2022, but following then-Disney CEO Bob Chapek's response to Florida's Parental Rights in Education bill and the internal polarizing uproar it caused within Disney, the scene was reinstated. Speaking to Variety, Evans stated about the scene: "it's nice, and it's wonderful, it makes me happy. It's tough to not be a little frustrated that it even has to be a topic of discussion [...] The goal is that we can get to a point where it is the norm, and that this doesn't have to be some uncharted waters, that eventually this is just the way it is. That representation across the board is how we make films."

=== Home media ===
Lightyear was made available on Disney+ on August 3, 2022, with viewers able to choose between the theatrical version and the IMAX Enhanced version of the film. Walt Disney Studios Home Entertainment released Lightyear on Ultra HD Blu-ray, DVD and Blu-ray on September 13, 2022.

The film was released on Disney+ Hotstar in Indonesia and Malaysia, where it had not received a theatrical release following requests to remove the same-sex kiss. Lightyear was released with an 18+ rating in Malaysia and a 21+ rating in Indonesia, both of which are equivalent to the adults-only NC-17 rating, and included a mature-content warning before the film began. IGN Southeast Asia also confirmed that the same-sex relationship remained intact, including the previously mentioned kiss. Disney+ did not make the film available in the Middle East and North Africa region, excluding Israel, citing its decision to comply with local censorship rules. As a result, content aimed at children that included LGBTQ references, including Lightyear, was not released in these territories.

Analytics company Samba TV, which gathers viewership data from certain smart TVs and content providers, reported that Lightyear attracted 1.7 million American households during its first five days on Disney+. Nielsen Media Research, which records streaming viewership on certain American television screens, announced that Lightyear was the most-streamed film during the week of August 1–7, with 1.306 billion minutes viewed. Approximately 36% of the film's audience was aged 2–11, while 23% was aged 18–34. At 27%, the film's audience had the third-highest concentration of Hispanic households among films on the week's chart. The following week, between August 8–14, Lightyear generated 700 million minutes of watch time, placing third. From August 15–21, the film recorded 361 million minutes viewed, ranking as the fourth most-streamed film that week. Lightyear was streamed for 251 million minutes during the week of August 22–28, placing seventh. Between August 29 and September 4, the film generated 211 million minutes of watch time, ranking ninth.

On physical media, Lightyear was the seventh best-selling film of September 2022, according to Circana's VideoScan tracking service, which compiles DVD and Blu-ray sales.

== Reception ==
=== Box office ===
Lightyear grossed $118.3 million in the United States and Canada, and $108.1 million in other territories, for a worldwide total of $226.4 million. It was the fourth highest-grossing animated film of 2022 in the U.S. and the fifth worldwide. Deadline Hollywood calculated the film lost the studio $106 million, when factoring together all expenses and revenues.

In the United States and Canada, Lightyear was projected to gross $70–85 million from 4,255 theaters in its opening weekend, with some estimates reaching as high as $105 million. However, after making $20.7 million on its first day (including $5.2 million from Thursday night previews), estimates were lowered to $51–55 million. It went on to debut to $50.6 million, finishing second behind holdover Jurassic World Dominion. Additionally, the film earned $34.6 million from 43 international markets, bringing its worldwide three-day debut to $85.2 million. In its second weekend, Lightyear declined 64.1% to $18.2 million, the second-lowest sophomore drop for a Pixar film after Onward (73%), which opened at the onset of the pandemic.

Both Deadline Hollywood and Variety attributed the performance to competition from Jurassic World Dominion and Top Gun: Maverick, though ultimately noted it as a disappointment given the brand strength of both Pixar and the Toy Story franchise. Los Angeles Times writer Ryan Faughnder believed that the film was at a disadvantage, since, as a spin-off film, it did not have well-known Toy Story characters such as Woody. He also noted that spin-offs tend to not gross as much as the main franchise installments, and compared the film to the spin-off films Solo: A Star Wars Story (2018) and Hobbs & Shaw (2019). Pamela McClintock of The Hollywood Reporter wrote that, in addition to competition from Jurassic World Dominion and Top Gun: Maverick, the lackluster opening was attributed to brand confusion in the film's marketing. McClintock, Martha Ross of The Mercury News, and The Washington Post's Sonny Bunch also questioned if the response from people over the inclusion of a lesbian couple kissing and the decision not to cast Tim Allen in the role of Buzz Lightyear were the reasons for the film's low opening. Other box office analysts believed family audiences might have not shown up to theaters after becoming accustomed to the availability of Pixar films at home after their three previous films, Soul (2020), Luca (2021), and Turning Red (2022), were released directly to Disney+ during the pandemic. Some box office analysts theorized that family audiences were reluctant to attend theaters in general due to COVID-19 concerns, although this was disproven after Minions: The Rise of Gru opened to $107 million in the U.S. and Canada two weeks later.

=== Critical response ===
On the review aggregator website Rotten Tomatoes, 74% of 322 critics' reviews are positive, with an average rating of 6.7/10. The website's consensus reads: "Lightyear settles for being a rather conventional origin story instead of reaching for the stars, but this gorgeously animated adventure ably accomplishes its mission of straightforward fun." Lightyear is the lowest rated film of the Toy Story franchise on Rotten Tomatoes. Metacritic, which uses a weighted average, assigned the film a score of 60 out of 100, based on 57 critics, indicating "mixed or average" reviews. Audiences polled by CinemaScore gave the film an average grade of "A−" on an A+ to F scale, while those at PostTrak gave it an overall positive score of 85% (including an average 4 out of 5 stars), with 62% saying they would definitely recommend it.

Peter Bradshaw's four-star review for The Guardian stated: "This cracking origin story for Toy Story's spaceman hero is fun and clever and reminds us why we loved Pixar in the first place." David Rooney of The Hollywood Reporter called it "a funny spinoff with suspense and heart, a captivatingly spirited toon take on splashy live-action retro popcorn entertainment." Emma Stefansky of Thrillist said: "There's plenty in Lightyear to enjoy, and it's one of Pixar's better efforts over the last 10 years, but it ultimately feels half-done. It feels like it ought to be the beginning of something, like its narrative is a prologue stretched into a feature awaiting the much more interesting second and third and fifth installments down the road." RogerEbert.com-based critic Odie Henderson praised the score who called it as "one of Giacchino's best scores" and "a delectable spoof of bombastic space movie music that elevates every scene it plays under". Tara Brady of The Irish Times wrote: "There are some striking designs and a few hat-tips to 2001: A Space Odyssey. But it all feels a bit perfunctory, like a successful launch that has no destination among the stars or anywhere else." Valerie Complex of Deadline Hollywood stated: "Lightyear does not rely too much on Toy Story lore to build its world, but it would have benefited from showing some connection to that part of the franchise instead of using title cards." She further praised the technical aspects, and wrote: "The animation is gorgeous and hyper-realistic. The art department put their all into designing this universe and its characters and robotic villains," but criticized the screenplay saying "sometimes the story becomes convoluted and drags on, almost like there was a need to pad the runtime, causing Lightyear to get into even more trouble and creating a never-ending slew of trampling obstacles."

Variety's Owen Gleiberman wrote: "Lightyear in its eminently conventional and likable way, is a far less audacious movie than that. For what is surely not the first time, Buzz's I-can-do-anything myopic bravado has failed [...] part of that may be that in the Toy Story films, he is a toy — that's part of the joke, one that Buzz is never quite in on. He thinks he's a real Space Ranger! So when you actually turn Buzz Lightyear into a Space Ranger, you enlarge him and diminish him at the same time." In contrast, BBC's Nicholas Barber wrote: "The story is thin, repetitive, and almost entirely dependent on the heroes being clumsy" and gave the film two stars. David Ehrlich of IndieWire wrote: "Lightyear remains firmly stuck in the past even as it hurtles toward the future. And while screenwriters Jason Headley and Angus MacLane need that push-pull in order to tell a story about reconciling the lure of nostalgia with the potential for something new, it's hard for a movie to sell us on living in the moment when every scene feels like it's settling for less." Kaleem Aftab of Time Out called the film "a franchise low, Pixar's meta Toy Story spin-off gets lost in space." The film has received criticism from some conservatives, who have argued that the film's scene with a same-sex kiss is inappropriate for children.

When asked about Lightyear in 2023, Pixar's chief creative officer Pete Docter stated that while the studio "love[s] the movie", he believed "we asked too much of the audience. [...] Even if they've read the material in press, it was just a little too distant, both in concept, and I think in the way that characters were drawn, that they were portrayed. [...] the characters in 'Toy Story' are much broader, and so I think there was a disconnect between what people wanted/expected and what we were giving to them."

=== Accolades ===
| Award | Year | Category | Recipient | Result | Ref. |
|---|---|---|---|---|---|
| Alliance of Women Film Journalists | 2023 | Best Animated Female Voice | Keke Palmer | Nominated | |
| Annie Awards | February 25, 2023 | Outstanding Achievement for Animated Effects in an Animated Production | Carl Kaphan, Cody Harrington, Hope Schroers, Jon Barry, Nate Skeen | Nominated | |
| Annie Awards | February 25, 2023 | Outstanding Achievement for Editorial in a Feature Production | Tony Greenberg, Katie Bishop, Chloe Kloezeman, Axel Geddes, Tim Fox | Nominated | |
| Art Directors Guild Awards | February 18, 2023 | Excellence in Production Design for an Animated Film | Tim Evatt | Nominated | |
| Black Reel Awards | February 6, 2023 | Outstanding Voice Performance | Keke Palmer | Nominated | |
| Casting Society of America | March 9, 2023 | Outstanding Achievement in Casting - Animation Feature | Natalie Lyon, Kevin Reher, Kate Hansen-Birnbaum | Nominated | |
| International Film Music Critics Association Awards | February 23, 2023 | Best Original Score for an Animated Film | Michael Giacchino | Nominated | |
| Motion Picture Sound Editors | February 26, 2023 | Outstanding Achievement in Sound Editing – Sound Effects, Foley, Dialogue and ADR for Animated Feature Film | Coya Elliott (supervising sound editor); Ren Klyce (sound designer); Kimberly Patrick, Jonathon Stevens, Benjamin A. Burtt (sound effects editor); Cheryl Nardi (dialogue editor); James Spencer, Dee Selby (foley editors); Shelley Roden, John Roesch (foley artists) | Nominated | |
| NAACP Image Awards | February 25, 2023 | Outstanding Character Voice Performance – Motion Picture | Keke Palmer | Won | |
| Nickelodeon Kids' Choice Awards | March 4, 2023 | Favorite Animated Movie | Lightyear | Nominated | |
| Nickelodeon Kids' Choice Awards | March 4, 2023 | Favorite Voice from an Animated Movie (Male) | Chris Evans | Nominated | |
| Nickelodeon Kids' Choice Awards | March 4, 2023 | Favorite Voice from an Animated Movie (Female) | Keke Palmer | Nominated | |
| Saturn Awards | October 25, 2022 | Best Animated Film | Lightyear | Nominated | |
| Visual Effects Society Awards | February 15, 2023 | Outstanding Created Environment in an Animated Feature | T'Kani Prime Forest – Lenora Acidera, Amy Allen, Alyssa Minko, Jose L. Ramos Serrano | Nominated | |
| Visual Effects Society Awards | February 15, 2023 | Outstanding Effects Simulations in an Animated Feature | Alexis Angelidis, Chris Chapman, Jung-Hyun Kim, Keith Klohn | Nominated | |

== Impact ==
Due to the box-office underperformance of Lightyear, the film's director Angus MacLane and producer Galyn Susman were two of 75 Pixar employees who were laid off in June 2023.
