= Elissa Knight =

American actress (born 1975)

- Born: April 15, 1975 (age 51); Santa Cruz, California
- Education: University of California, Santa Cruz
- Occupation: Voice actress
- Years active: 1998–present
- Notable work: WALL-E
- Children: 1

External image
- Knight at the event for WALL-E in 2008

Elissa Knight (born April 15, 1975) is an American employee at Pixar and voice actress. As a voice actress, her first major role was in the 2006 film Cars as one of the twins known as Tia and as EVE in WALL-E in 2008.

== Biography ==
Knight was born on April 15, 1975 in Santa Cruz, California. As a Pixar employee, she worked on numerous films, including Cars, Ratatouille, and WALL-E. Knight voices animated characters as necessary, occasionally recording scratch tracks for use until a big-name actor can record their dialogue. She had her first voice role in the 2006 film Cars as Tia, one of two identical twin Mazda Miata "sisters" who become fans of several of the race cars (the other is played by Lindsey Collins; both actors work at Pixar as assistants).

Knight continued to do voice acting in WALL-E. In WALL-E, she plays EVE (Extraterrestrial Vegetation Evaluator), a futuristic robot who descends to Earth in search of any life, specifically plants, that still exist in the 29th century. Knight stated that she had never read the script for WALL-E and made few preparations. Her recorded dialogue was originally meant to be a placeholder while the casting department looked for an actress that would voice the part, but the producers liked her performance enough to use it in the finished film.

== Personal life ==
Knight has one daughter.

== Filmography ==
=== Film ===
Year	Title	Role	Notes
2006	Cars	Tia	Also served as assistant
2008	WALL-E	EVE (Extraterrestrial Vegetation Evaluator)	First major role
2008	BURN-E	EVE (Extraterrestrial Vegetation Evaluator)	Short film Uncredited
2009	Tracy	Ellen Canzini (Junior)	
2013	Monsters University	Additional Voices	
2014	Party Central	Additional Voices	Short
2015	Inside Out	Additional Voices	female mind assistant

=== Television ===
Year	Title	Role	Notes
2008–11	Cars Toons: Mater's Tall Tales	Tia	7 Episodes

=== Video games ===
Year	Title	Role	Notes
2006	Cars	Tia	
2008	WALL-E	EVE (Extraterrestrial Vegetation Evaluator)	
2009	Cars Race-O-Rama	Tia	
2010	Toy Story 3: The Video Game	Lil	
2023	Disney Dreamlight Valley	EVE (Extraterrestrial Vegetation Evaluator)	A Rift in Time expansion
2024	Disney Speedstorm	EVE	Uncredited; archive audio; character added in a 2024 update
