= Andrew Stanton =

American filmmaker and animator (born 1965)

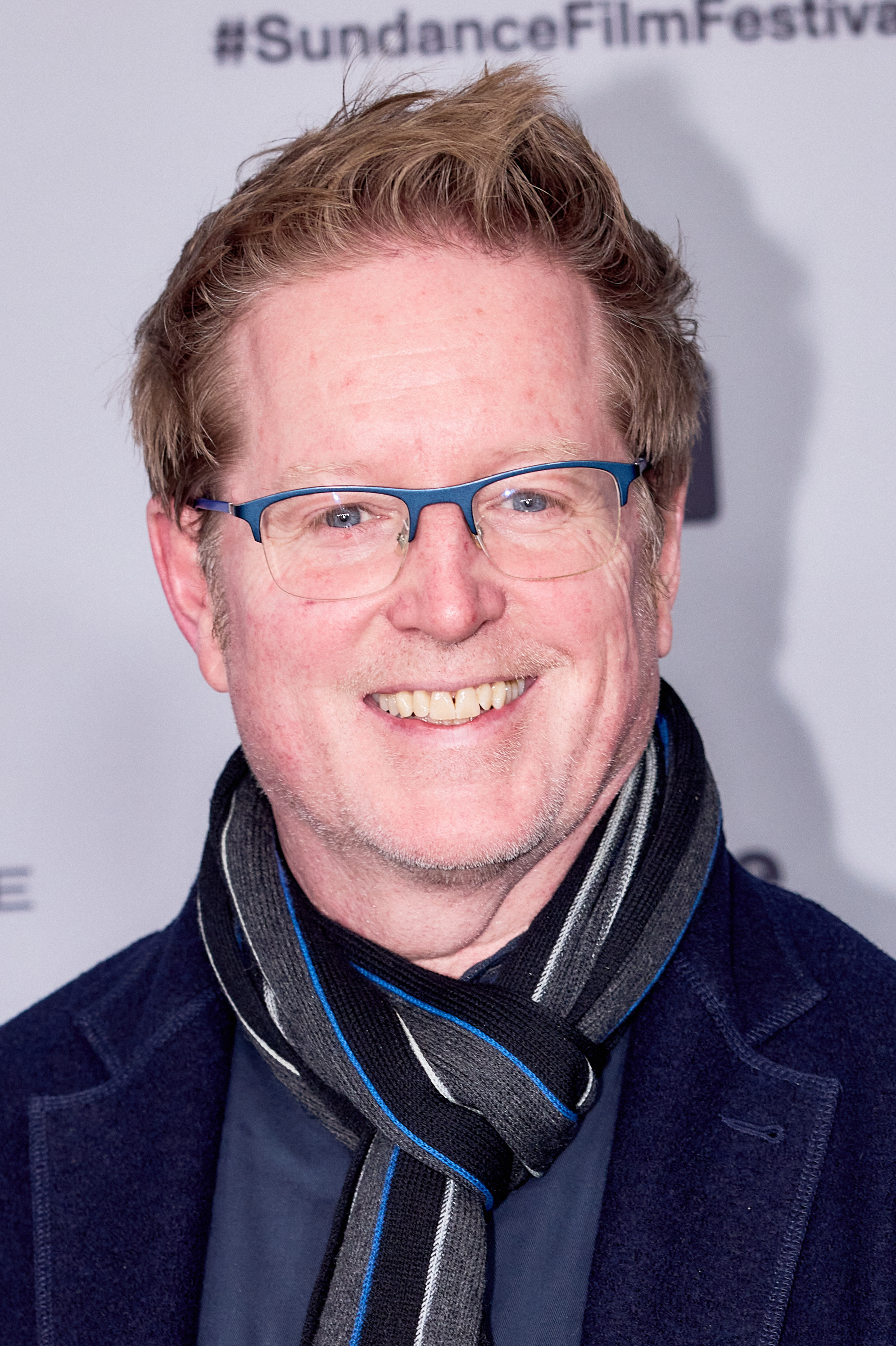
- Stanton in 2026
- Born: Andrew Ayers Stanton; December 3, 1965 (age 60); Rockport, Massachusetts, U.S.
- Education: California Institute of the Arts (BFA)
- Occupations: Film director; screenwriter; producer; animator; storyboard artist; voice actor
- Years active: 1981–present
- Employer: Pixar Animation Studios (1990–present)
- Spouse: Julie Stanton (m. 1989)
- Children: 2
- Awards: Academy Award for Best Animated Feature; Finding Nemo (2003); WALL-E (2008)

Andrew Ayers Stanton (born December 3, 1965) is an American filmmaker and animator. He is best known as the director and co-writer of the Pixar animated films Finding Nemo (2003), WALL-E (2008), Finding Dory (2016), and Toy Story 5 (2026). He also directed the live-action films John Carter (2012) and In the Blink of an Eye (2026). For Pixar, Stanton was additionally co-writer on the first four Toy Story films (1995–2019), A Bug's Life (1998), Monsters, Inc. (2001), and has had a degree of involvement in each of the company's feature films. His films have grossed more than $4 billion making him the tenth highest-grossing film director of all-time, not adjusted for inflation.

Finding Nemo and WALL-E earned Stanton two Academy Awards for Best Animated Feature. He was also nominated for three Academy Awards for Best Original Screenplay, for Finding Nemo, WALL-E, and Toy Story (1995), and for an Academy Award for Best Adapted Screenplay for Toy Story 3 (2010). WALL-E has also been inducted into the National Film Registry. Stanton has directed episodes of various television series since 2017, including episodes of 3 Body Problem, Better Call Saul, Legion, and Stranger Things.

== Early and personal life ==
Stanton was born in Rockport, Massachusetts. His father, Ron Stanton, was the founder of a company that worked on radars for the United States Department of Defense. His mother, Gloria Stanton, pursued an acting career before becoming a homemaker. Both of Stanton's parents were natives of nearby Wellesley.

Stanton acted in high school and directed sketch comedy shot on Super 8 film. He portrayed Barnaby Tucker in a 1980 high school production of Hello, Dolly!, which later became a source of inspiration for WALL-E. Stanton studied for a year at the University of Hartford before transferring to the character animation program at the California Institute of the Arts. He received his Bachelor of Fine Arts from CalArts in 1987.

In 1989, Stanton married his high school sweetheart Julie, two weeks after she graduated from Georgetown University. The couple subsequently settled in Los Angeles, where they raised two children, Ben and Audrey. Stanton is a Christian.

Stanton revealed in 2012 that he was diagnosed with attention deficit hyperactivity disorder when he was in the middle of writing John Carter.

Stanton is an Arsenal F.C. fan, and included a scene mimicking their famous offside trap among other Arsenal references in John Carter.

== Career ==
Stanton began his career in animation in the late 1980s. He worked as an animator for Kroyer Films, and one of his early gigs involved animating sperm for a sex-ed film with Martin Short called The Making of Me, originally produced for Disney's Wonders of Life pavilion. Stanton was one of several CalArts graduates hired by John Kricfalusi to work on Mighty Mouse: The New Adventures at Ralph Bakshi's studio.

After being rejected by Disney three times, Stanton was hired by Pixar's animation group in 1990 as its second animator (John Lasseter being the first) and ninth employee. Back then Pixar was not yet an animation studio, and their animation group was dedicated to making television commercials as a step towards their goal of making the first computer-animated feature.

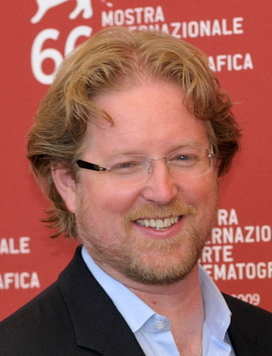
Stanton in 2009

Stanton, Lasseter and Pete Docter drafted the original treatment for Toy Story, which little resembled with the eventually finished film. After production of the film was shut down in late November 1993 following a disastrous test screening, Stanton retreated into a windowless office and extensively reworked the script with help from Joss Whedon. The resulting screenplay was nominated at the Academy Awards for Best Original Screenplay, the first nomination in that category for an animated film. Following his work on Toy Story, Stanton would go on to direct Finding Nemo (2003), WALL-E (2008), and Finding Dory (2016) for Pixar.

In an interview with World Magazine's Megan Basham, Stanton explained his singular vision for WALL-E:

What really interested me was the idea of the most human thing in the universe being a machine because it has more interest in finding out what the point of living is than actual people. The greatest commandment Christ gives us is to love, but that's not always our priority. So I came up with this premise that could demonstrate what I was trying to say—that irrational love defeats the world's programming. You've got these two robots that are trying to go above their basest directives, literally their programming, to experience love.

Stanton made his live-action directorial debut with the Edgar Rice Burroughs adaptation John Carter (2012). The film was a commercial failure.

Stanton co-wrote Toy Story 4, which was released on June 21, 2019. Initially, when he pitched the idea to director Josh Cooley, Cooley was concerned feeling like Toy Story 3 was the perfect ending. Stanton reportedly told Cooley "Toy Story 3 was a good ending--but it's not the ending." He explained that it was not the ending of Woody's story but rather the ending of Woody's time with Andy. Stanton reportedly started writing Toy Story 4 in secret while the third film was still in production.

Stanton has expressed interest in directing more live action films, stating that he wants to return "[b]ecause it's quicker and it's a little bit more of the opposite... It's the antithesis of animation. Animation you get to control everything, and it's awesome in that sense. But there's no spontaneity, and it takes a long time! And so there's high risk for the complete opposite reasons of live-action." In 2020, it was announced that Stanton was in talks to direct and write Chairman Spaceman for Searchlight Pictures and Simon Kinberg's production label, Genre Films. The film is based on The New Yorker short story of the same name by Thomas Pierce. The film would mark Stanton's third venture into the science fiction genre, following WALL-E and John Carter. Stanton has been quoted many times saying that science fiction is his favorite genre. Films like Star Wars, Blade Runner, Aliens, as well as Edgar Rice Burroughs' novel A Princess of Mars, helped shape his interest in the genre. The same year, Stanton was attached to direct Revolver, a romantic comedy starring Maya Hawke and Ethan Hawke from a screenplay by Kate Trefry. In 2022, it was announced that Stanton would direct the science fiction film In the Blink of an Eye for Searchlight Pictures from a screenplay by Colby Day. It was released on Hulu in February 2026.

In 2024, Docter announced that Stanton would write and direct the fifth main installment of the Toy Story series, Toy Story 5, which was released on June 19, 2026.

== Filmography ==
=== Films ===
Year	Title	Director	Writer	Executive Producer	Other	Voice Role	Notes
1995	Toy Story	No	Yes	No	Yes	Mr. Shark/Commercial Chorus 2	Story Artist, Character Designer
1998	A Bug's Life	Co-Director	Yes	No	Yes	Bug Zapper Bug 1/Singing Grasshopper 2	Story Artist
1999	Toy Story 2	No	Yes	No	Yes	Emperor Zurg	
2000	Buzz Lightyear of Star Command: The Adventure Begins	No	No	No	Yes	Hamm	Direct-to-video
2001	Monsters, Inc.	No	Yes	Yes	No		
2003	Finding Nemo	Yes	Yes	No	Yes	Crush/Lobster/Seagulls	
2004	The Incredibles	No	No	No	Yes	Additional Voices	
2006	Cars	No	No	No	Yes	Fred	Additional Screenplay Material
2007	Ratatouille	No	No	Yes	No		
2008	WALL-E	Yes	Yes	No	Yes	Axiom Passenger 2	Pixar Senior Creative Team - uncredited on WALL-E
2009	Up	No	No	Yes	Yes		Pixar Senior Creative Team - uncredited on WALL-E
2010	Toy Story 3	No	Story	No	Yes		Pixar Senior Creative Team - uncredited on WALL-E
2011	Cars 2	No	No	No	Yes		Pixar Senior Creative Team - uncredited on WALL-E
2012	John Carter	Yes	Yes	No	No		
2012	Brave	No	No	Yes	Yes		Pixar Senior Creative Team
2013	Monsters University	No	No	Yes	Yes		Pixar Senior Creative Team
2015	Inside Out	No	No	Yes	Yes		Pixar Senior Creative Team
2015	The Good Dinosaur	No	No	Yes	Yes		Pixar Senior Creative Team
2016	Finding Dory	Yes	Yes	No	Yes	Crush/Clam/Seagulls	Pixar Senior Creative Team
2017	Cars 3	No	No	No	Yes		Pixar Senior Creative Team
2017	Coco	No	No	No	Yes		Pixar Senior Creative Team
2018	Incredibles 2	No	No	No	Yes		Pixar Senior Creative Team
2018	Ralph Breaks the Internet	No	No	No	Yes		Narrative Guru
2019	Toy Story 4	No	Yes	Yes	Yes		Pixar Senior Creative Team
2020	Onward	No	No	No	Yes		Pixar Senior Creative Team
2020	Soul	No	No	No	Yes		Pixar Senior Creative Team
2021	Luca	No	No	No	Yes		Pixar Senior Creative Team
2022	Turning Red	No	No	No	Yes		Pixar Senior Creative Team
2022	Lightyear	No	No	Yes	Yes		Additional Screenplay Material, Pixar Senior Creative Team
2023	Elemental	No	No	No	Yes		Pixar Senior Creative Team
2024	Inside Out 2	No	No	No	Yes		Pixar Senior Creative Team
2025	Elio	No	No	No	Yes		Pixar Senior Creative Team
2026	In the Blink of an Eye	Yes	No	No	No		
2026	Hoppers	No	No	No	Yes		Pixar Senior Creative Team
2026	Toy Story 5	Yes	Yes	No	Yes	Captain Suds/Jimmy Dean/Emperor Zurg	Pixar Senior Creative Team

==== Short films ====
Year	Title	Director	Writer	Executive Producer	Voice
1986	Somewhere in the Arctic	Yes	Yes	No	Bahr
1987	A Story	Yes	Yes	Producer	Randy, Goon Squad
1991	Light & Heavy	Yes	No	No	
2003	Exploring the Reef with Jean-Michel Cousteau	No	No	Yes	
2008	Presto	No	No	Yes	
2008	BURN-E	No	Story	Yes	
2009	Partly Cloudy	No	No	Yes	
2016	Piper	No	No	Yes	
2016	Marine Life Interviews	No	Yes	No	
2027	Loving Dory	No	No	Yes	

=== TV episodes and specials ===
Year	Title	Director	Writer	Executive Producer	Story Artist	Voice	Notes
1987	Mighty Mouse: The New Adventures	No	Yes	No	No		13 episodes
1994	2 Stupid Dogs	No	No	No	Yes		Episode: "Cookies, Ookies, Blookies"
1995	The Lion King's Timon & Pumbaa	No	No	No	Yes		Episode: "Good Mousekeeping"
2010	Fetch! with Ruff Ruffman	No	No	No	No	Crush	Episode: "The Ol' Shell Game"
2013	Toy Story of Terror!	No	No	Yes	No		TV special
2017	Stranger Things	Yes	No	No	No		Episodes: "Chapter Five: Dig Dug" and "Chapter Six: The Spy"
2018	Better Call Saul	Yes	No	No	No		Episode: "Piñata"
2019	Legion	Yes	No	No	No		Episode: "Chapter 20"
2020	Tales from the Loop	Yes	No	No	No		Episode: "Echo Sphere"
2021–2022	For All Mankind	Yes	No	No	No		Directed four episodes
2022	Obi-Wan Kenobi	No	Yes	No	No		Episodes: "Part V" and "Part VI"
2024	3 Body Problem	Yes	No	Co-Executive	No		Director: "Destroyer of Worlds"
2025	Win or Lose	No	No	Yes	No		

=== Video games ===
Year	Title	Role	Notes
1998	A Bug's Life	Hopper	Replacing Kevin Spacey
1999	Toy Story 2: Buzz Lightyear to the Rescue	Emperor Zurg	
2003	Finding Nemo	Crush	
2003	Disney's Extreme Skate Adventure	Emperor Zurg	
2006	Finding Nemo: Escape to the Big Blue	Seagulls	Nintendo DS and Nintendo 3DS only
2007	Cars Mater-National Championship	Fred	
2009	Cars Race-O-Rama	Fred / Tater Jr.	PS3/Xbox 360/Wii version only
2011	Kinect Disneyland Adventures	Crush	
2015	Disney Infinity 3.0	Crush	
2018	Lego The Incredibles	Seagulls	

=== Theme parks ===
Year	Title	Role	Notes
1989–2007	The Making of Me		Animator
1998–2025	It's Tough to Be a Bug!	Hopper	Reprising his voice doubling for Kevin Spacey
2007–present	The Seas with Nemo & Friends	Crush, Seagulls	
2007–present	Finding Nemo Submarine Voyage	Crush, Seagulls	

=== Other credits ===
Year	Title	Role
1997	Geri's Game	Very special thanks
2000	For the Birds	Thanks
2006	Lifted	Special thanks
2007	Fog City Mavericks	Special thanks
2007	The Pixar Story	Himself; very special thanks
2010	Finding Nico	Special thanks
2014	Lava	Special thanks
2014	Toy Story That Time Forgot	Extra special thanks
2015	Sanjay's Super Team	Special thanks
2016	Zootopia	Creative consultant
2019	Purl	Kristen Lester's story trust
2019	Frozen II	Special thanks
2019	Spies in Disguise	Special thanks
2021	Encanto	Special thanks
2022	Beyond Infinity: Buzz and the Journey to 'Lightyear'	Himself
2022	Cars on the Road	Special thanks; Pixar senior creative team
2023	Nimona	Special thanks

== Collaborations (acting) ==
Andrew Stanton has cast certain actors in more than one of the films he has directed.

	Finding Nemo	WALL-E	John Carter	Finding Dory	In the Blink of an Eye	Toy Story 5
Albert Brooks	X mark			X mark		
Ellen DeGeneres	X mark			X mark		
Alexander Gould	X mark			X mark		
Willem Dafoe	X mark		X mark	X mark		
Brad Garrett	X mark			X mark		
Allison Janney	X mark			X mark		
Austin Pendleton	X mark			X mark		
Stephen Root	X mark			X mark		
Vicki Lewis	X mark			X mark		
Himself	X mark	X mark		X mark		X mark
Bob Peterson	X mark			X mark		
John Ratzenberger	X mark	X mark		X mark		X mark
Bob Bergen	X mark	X mark				
Paul Eiding	X mark	X mark				
Jess Harnell	X mark	X mark				
Sherry Lynn	X mark	X mark				
Mickie McGowan	X mark	X mark				
Laraine Newman	X mark	X mark				
Jeff Pidgeon	X mark	X mark				
Jan Rabson	X mark	X mark				
Jim Ward	X mark	X mark				
Sigourney Weaver		X mark		X mark		
Angus MacLane		X mark		X mark		
Dominic West			X mark	X mark		
Kate McKinnon				X mark	X mark	

== Award and nominations ==
=== Academy Awards ===
Year	Category	Film	Result	Shared with
1995	Best Original Screenplay	Toy Story	Nominated	Joss Whedon, Joel Cohen, Alec Sokolow, John Lasseter, Pete Docter, and Joe Ranft
2003	Best Animated Feature	Finding Nemo	Won	—N/a
2003	Best Original Screenplay	Finding Nemo	Nominated	Bob Peterson and David Reynolds
2008	Best Animated Feature	WALL-E	Won	—N/a
2008	Best Original Screenplay	WALL-E	Nominated	Jim Reardon and Pete Docter
2010	Best Adapted Screenplay	Toy Story 3	Nominated	Michael Arndt, John Lasseter, and Lee Unkrich

== Preservation ==
Two of Stanton's short films, A Story and Somewhere in the Arctic..., were preserved by the Academy Film Archive in 2012.

== Bibliography ==
- Price, David (2008). The Pixar Touch: The Making of a Company. New York: Alfred A. Knopf. ISBN 978-0-307-26575-3.
