= WALL-E =

2008 film by Andrew Stanton

- Theatrical release poster
- Directed by: Andrew Stanton
- Screenplay by: Andrew Stanton; Jim Reardon
- Story by: Andrew Stanton; Pete Docter
- Produced by: Jim Morris
- Starring: Ben Burtt; Elissa Knight; Jeff Garlin; Fred Willard; John Ratzenberger; Kathy Najimy; Sigourney Weaver
- Cinematography: Jeremy Lasky; Danielle Feinberg
- Edited by: Stephen Schaffer
- Music by: Thomas Newman
- Production company: Pixar Animation Studios
- Distributed by: Walt Disney Studios Motion Pictures (Note: Distributed under the Walt Disney Pictures banner.)
- Release dates: June 23, 2008 (Greek Theatre); June 27, 2008 (United States)
- Running time: 98 minutes
- Country: United States
- Language: English
- Budget: $180 million
- Box office: $532.5 million

WALL-E (stylized with an interpunct as WALL·E) is a 2008 American animated science fiction film directed by Andrew Stanton, who co-wrote the screenplay with Jim Reardon, based on a story by Stanton and Pete Docter. Produced by Pixar Animation Studios for Walt Disney Pictures, the film stars the voices of Ben Burtt, Elissa Knight, Jeff Garlin, John Ratzenberger, Kathy Najimy, and Sigourney Weaver, with Fred Willard in a live-action role. The film follows a solitary robot named WALL-E on a future, uninhabitable, deserted Earth in 2805, left to clean up garbage. He is visited by a robot called EVE sent from the starship Axiom, whom he falls in love with and pursues across the galaxy.

After directing Finding Nemo, Stanton felt Pixar had created believable simulations of underwater physics and was willing to direct a film set largely in space. WALL-E has minimal dialogue in its early sequences; many of the characters in the film do not have voices, but instead communicate with body language and robotic sounds that were designed by Burtt. The film incorporates various topics including human environmental impact and concerns, global catastrophic risk, consumerism, corporatocracy, waste management, obesity/sedentary lifestyles, and nostalgia. It is also Pixar's first animated film featuring live-action segments. Thomas Newman composed the film's musical score. The film cost $180 million to produce, a record-breaking sum for an animated film at the time.

WALL-E premiered at the Greek Theatre in Los Angeles on June 23, 2008, and was released in the United States on June 27. The film received widespread acclaim for its animation, characters, themes, visuals, score, sound design, screenplay and use of minimal dialogue. It was also commercially successful, grossing $532 million worldwide and becoming the ninth-highest grossing film of 2008. It won several awards, including the Academy Award for Best Animated Feature alongside five additional nominations. The film was widely named by critics and organizations, including the American Film Institute and National Board of Review, as one of the best films of 2008 and among the greatest animated films ever made. In 2021, WALL-E was selected for preservation in the United States National Film Registry by the Library of Congress as being "culturally, historically, or aesthetically significant".

== Plot ==
In the year 2805, Earth is an inhospitable, garbage-strewn wasteland due to an ecocide caused by rampant consumerism, corporate greed, and environmental neglect. Humanity was evacuated to space by the megacorporation Buy n Large on giant spaceships 700 years earlier, leaving trash-compacting "WALL-E" robots to clean up the planet, but the cleanup was eventually abandoned after the planet became far too toxic. All but one of the robots have stopped functioning; the last remaining active WALL-E has developed a personality and uses a truck designed to carry the WALL-E robots as a home. WALL-E remains active by salvaging parts from other inactive robots, with his pet cockroach Hal as his only companion.

One day, WALL-E's routine of compressing trash and collecting interesting objects is broken by the arrival of a sleek, futuristic robot called EVE, who scans the planet for sustainable life. WALL-E is smitten by her, and the two begin to connect until EVE goes into standby mode when WALL-E shows her his most recent find: a living seedling. WALL-E cares for EVE until she is collected by a large unmanned rocket; with WALL-E clinging on, it returns to its mothership, the starliner Axiom.

In the centuries since the Axiom left Earth, its passengers have degenerated into helpless obesity due to laziness, using hoverchairs and robots catering to their every whim. Captain B. McCrea sits back while his robotic AI autopilot helm, nicknamed AUTO, pilots the ship. McCrea is unprepared for the positive probe response, but discovers that placing the plant in the ship's Holo-Detector will trigger a hyperjump back to Earth so that humanity can begin recolonization. When McCrea inspects EVE's storage compartment, the plant is missing, and EVE blames WALL-E for its disappearance.

EVE is deemed faulty and taken to diagnostics. Mistaking this for torture, WALL-E intervenes and inadvertently releases the other faulty bots, causing him and EVE to be designated rogue robots. Frustrated with WALL-E's reckless actions, EVE tries sending WALL-E home in an escape pod, but as WALL-E refuses, the two witness McCrea's first mate robot, GO-4, stowing the plant in a pod set to self-destruct, proving WALL-E's innocence. WALL-E enters the pod to retrieve the plant just as it launches, and he and the plant survive the pod's destruction. EVE catches up to him and they reconcile, dancing in space around the Axiom.

EVE brings the plant to McCrea, who watches her recordings of Earth, concluding that they must save it. EVE is touched by seeing recordings of WALL-E caring for her while she was in standby mode, understanding his feelings for her. AUTO reveals his secret no-return directive A113, recorded by Shelby Forthright, Buy n Large's CEO, in 2110, which orders them not to return to Earth on account of its toxicity levels, unaware that the planet is actually starting to recover; AUTO had ordered GO-4 to get rid of the plant earlier. When McCrea tries overriding the directive, AUTO mutinies and electrocutes WALL-E, throws him and EVE down a garbage chute, and confines McCrea to his quarters. EVE and WALL-E are nearly ejected into space with the Axiom's garbage, but a cleaning robot named M-O inadvertently jams the airlock and rescues them.

McCrea escapes by tricking AUTO with an image of the plant and fights for control of the Axiom, destroying GO-4 in the process, while humans and robots work to secure the real plant. AUTO crushes WALL-E using the Holo-Detector, but McCrea rises from his chair, activates the manual override and deactivates AUTO. EVE inserts the plant into the Holo-Detector, initiating the hyperjump back to Earth. Arriving on Earth, EVE repairs WALL-E, but his memory and personality have been erased. Heartbroken, EVE gives WALL-E a "smooch", which releases a static electricity shock, restoring him. WALL-E and EVE reunite as the Axiom inhabitants take their first steps on Earth. Humans and robots work to restore the ravaged planet with the help of WALL-E and EVE, and the plant grows into a tree, which WALL-E and EVE admire together.

== Cast ==
=== Voice cast ===
- Ben Burtt as:
  - WALL-E (Waste Allocation Load Lifter: Earth-class), a compactor robot who has achieved sentience, and is the only one still functioning on Earth. He is a small mobile compactor box accompanied by his cockroach friend Hal. He collects trinkets from the garbage and displays them at his home, where he watches a video cassette of 20th Century Fox's Hello, Dolly!, mimicking the dance sequences.
  - M-O (Microbe-Obliterator), a cleaning robot.
- Elissa Knight as EVE (Extraterrestrial Vegetation Evaluator), a glossy white egg-shaped probe robot with blue LED eyes, whose directive is to verify the habitability of planets for humans. She moves using antigravity and is equipped with scanners, specimen storage, and a cannon which she is quick to use.
- Jeff Garlin as Captain B. McCrea, the captain of the Axiom. While McCrea's name was never spoken, it does appear on a portrait of him in his quarters. He is only ever referred to as the Captain.
- MacInTalk, the text-to-speech program for Apple Macintosh computers, is the voice of AUTO, the Axiom's rogue AI autopilot which handles command functions of the ship. Loyal only to directive A113, he and GO-4 are the only computers not influenced by WALL-E.
- John Ratzenberger and Kathy Najimy as John and Mary, who live on the Axiom, so dependent on their automatic services as to be oblivious to their surroundings. They are brought out of their trances by encounters with WALL-E and fall in love with each other.
- Sigourney Weaver as the Axiom's computer. Stanton joked to Weaver: "You realize you get to be 'Mother' now?" referring to the ship's computer in the film Alien, starring Weaver.

=== Live-action cast ===
- Fred Willard as Shelby Forthright, the CEO of the Buy n Large Corporation and the President of Earth. He is the only major live-action character, appearing only in videos recorded around the time of the Axiom's launch in the 22nd century. Forthright proposed the plan to evacuate Earth's population and then clean up the planet so they could return within five years. Discovering that Earth had become too toxic to support life, the cleanup and recolonization were abandoned. Forthright issued directive A113 where the auto-pilots are ordered to prevent anyone from returning to Earth. To date, Forthright is the only live-action character with a speaking role in any Pixar film.
- Michael Crawford and Marianne McAndrew appear in an archival recording performing "It Only Takes a Moment" from Hello, Dolly!.

== Production ==
=== Writing ===
BACK ON M-O AND WALLY [sic]

M-O just finishes cleaning the floor.
Wally is fascinated.
Impishly makes another mark.
M-O compulsively cleans it. Can't resist.

M-O (bleeps):
[Look, it stays clean. You got that?]

Wally wipes the bottom of his tread on M-O's face.
M-O loses it.
Scrubs his own face.

— Stanton wrote the screenplay to focus on the visuals
and as a guide to what the sound effects needed to convey

As depicted in the teaser trailer, Andrew Stanton conceived WALL-E during a lunch with fellow writers John Lasseter, Pete Docter, and Joe Ranft in 1994. Toy Story was near completion and the writers brainstormed ideas for their next projects—A Bug's Life, Monsters, Inc., and Finding Nemo—at this lunch. Stanton asked, "What if mankind had to leave Earth and somebody forgot to turn off the last robot?" Having struggled for many years with making the characters in Toy Story appealing, Stanton found his simple Robinson Crusoe-esque idea of a lonely robot on a deserted planet strong. Stanton made WALL-E a waste collector as the idea was instantly understandable, and because it was a low-status menial job that made him sympathetic. Stanton also liked the imagery of stacked cubes of garbage. He did not find the idea dark because having a planet covered in garbage was for him a childish imagining of disaster.

Stanton and Docter spent two months developing Trash Planet in 1995 but abandoned it due to story issues, with Docter pivoting to direct Monsters, Inc.. Stanton came up with the idea of WALL-E finding a plant, because his life as the sole inhabitant on a deserted world reminded Stanton of a plant growing among pavements. Before they turned their attention to other projects, Stanton and Lasseter thought about having WALL-E fall in love, as it was the necessary progression away from loneliness. Stanton started writing WALL-E again in 2002 while completing Finding Nemo. Stanton formatted his script in a manner reminiscent of Dan O'Bannon's Alien. O'Bannon wrote his script in a manner Stanton found reminded him of haiku, where visual descriptions were done in continuous lines of a few words. Stanton wrote his robot "dialogue" conventionally, but placed them in brackets. In late 2003, Stanton and a few others created a story reel of the first twenty minutes of the film. Lasseter and Steve Jobs were impressed and officially began development, though Jobs stated he did not like the title, originally spelled "W.A.L.-E."

While the first act of WALL-E "fell out of the sky" for Stanton, he had originally wanted aliens to plant EVE to explore Earth and the rest of the film was different. When WALL-E comes to the Axiom, he incites a Spartacus-style rebellion by the robots against the remnants of the human race, which were cruel alien Gels (completely devolved, gelatinous, boneless, legless, see-through, green creatures that resemble Jell-O). James Hicks, a physiologist, mentioned to Stanton the concept of atrophy and the effects prolonged weightlessness would have on humans living in space for an inordinately extended time period. Therefore, this was the inspiration of the humans degenerating into the alien Gels, and their ancestry would have been revealed in a Planet of the Apes-style ending. The Gels also spoke a made-up gibberish language, but Stanton scrapped this idea because he thought it would be too complicated for the audience to understand and they could easily be driven off from the storyline. The Gels had a royal family, who host a dance in a castle on a lake in the back of the ship, and the Axiom curled up into a ball when returning to Earth in this incarnation of the story. Stanton decided this was too bizarre and unengaging, and conceived humanity as "big babies". Stanton developed the metaphorical theme of the humans learning to stand again and "grow[ing] up", wanting WALL-E and EVE's relationship to inspire humanity because he felt few films explore how utopian societies come to exist. The process of depicting the descendants of humanity as the way they appear in the movie was slow. Stanton first decided to put a nose and ears on the Gels so the audience could recognize them. Eventually, fingers, legs, clothes, and other characteristics were added until they arrived at the concept of being fetus-like to allow the audience to see themselves in the characters.

In a later version of the film, AUTO comes to the docking bay to retrieve EVE's plant. The film would have its first cutaway to the captain, but Stanton moved that as he found it too early to begin moving away from WALL-E's point-of-view. As an homage to Get Smart, AUTO takes the plant and goes into the bowels of the ship into a room resembling a brain where he watches videos of Buy n Large's scheme to clean up the Earth falling apart through the years. Stanton removed this to keep some mystery as to why the plant is taken from EVE. The captain appears to be unintelligent, but Stanton wanted him to just be unchallenged; otherwise he would have not been sympathetic. One example of how unintelligent the captain was depicted initially is that he was seen to wear his hat upside-down, only to fix it before he challenges AUTO. In the finished film, he merely wears it casually atop his head, tightening it when he really takes command of the Axiom.

Stanton also moved the moment where WALL-E reveals his plant (which he had snatched from the self-destructing escape pod) from producing it from a closet to immediately after his escape, as it made EVE happier and gave them stronger motivation to dance around the ship. Originally, EVE would have been electrocuted by AUTO, and then be quickly saved from ejection at the hands of the Waste Allocation Load Lifter: Axiom-class (WALL-A) robots, by WALL-E. He would have then revived her by replacing her power unit with a cigarette lighter he brought from Earth. Stanton reversed this following a 2007 test screening, as he wanted to show EVE replacing her directive of bringing the plant to the captain with repairing WALL-E, and it made WALL-E even more heroic if he held the holo-detector open despite being badly hurt. The idea of WALL-E losing his memory and personality came after the braintrust team abandoned a scene where EVE had been shot in her heart battery and WALL-E gave her his own battery instead. Stanton felt half the audience at the screening believed the humans would be unable to cope with living on Earth and would have died out after the film's end. Jim Capobianco, director of the Ratatouille short film Your Friend the Rat, created an end credits animation that continued the story—and stylized in different artistic movements throughout history—to clarify an optimistic tone.

=== Design ===
WALL-E was the most complex Pixar production since Monsters, Inc. because of the world and the history that had to be conveyed. Whereas most Pixar films have up to 75,000 storyboards, WALL-E required 125,000. Production designer Ralph Eggleston wanted the lighting of the first act on Earth to be romantic, and that of the second act on the Axiom to be cold and sterile. During the third act, the romantic lighting is slowly introduced into the Axiom environment. Pixar studied Chernobyl and the city of Sofia to create the ruined world; art director Anthony Christov was from Bulgaria and recalled Sofia used to have problems storing its garbage. Eggleston bleached out the whites on Earth to make WALL-E feel vulnerable. The overexposed light makes the location look more vast. Because of the haziness, the cubes making up the towers of garbage had to be large, otherwise they would have lost shape (in turn, this helped save rendering time). The dull tans of Earth subtly become soft pinks and blues when EVE arrives. When WALL-E shows EVE all his collected items, all the lights he has collected light up to give an inviting atmosphere, like a Christmas tree. Eggleston tried to avoid the colors yellow and green so WALL-E—who was made yellow to emulate a tractor—would not blend into the deserted Earth, and to make the plant more prominent.

WALL-E finds a bra. Roger Deakins and Dennis Muren were consulted on realistic lighting including backgrounds that are less focused than foregrounds.

Stanton also wanted the lighting to look realistic and evoke the science fiction films of his youth. He thought that Pixar captured the physics of being underwater with Finding Nemo and so for WALL-E, he wanted to push that for air. While rewatching some of his favorite science fiction films, he realized that Pixar's other movies had lacked the look of 70 mm film and its barrel distortion, lens flare, and racking focus. Producer Jim Morris invited Roger Deakins and Dennis Muren to advise on lighting and atmosphere. Muren spent several months with Pixar, while Deakins hosted one talk and was requested to stay on for another two weeks. Stanton said Muren's experience came from integrating computer animation into live-action settings, while Deakins helped them understand not to overly complicate their camerawork and lighting. 1970s Panavision cameras were used to help the animators understand and replicate handheld imperfections like unfocused backgrounds in digital environments. The first lighting test included building a three-dimensional replica of WALL-E, filming it with a 70 mm camera, and then trying to replicate that in the computer. Stanton cited the shallow lens work of Gus Van Sant's films as an influence, as it created intimacy in each close-up. Stanton chose angles for the virtual cameras that a live-action filmmaker would choose if filming on a set.

Stanton wanted the Axiom's interior to resemble Shanghai and Dubai. Eggleston studied 1960s NASA paintings and the original concept art for Tomorrowland for the Axiom, to reflect that era's sense of optimism. Stanton remarked "We are all probably very similar in our backgrounds here [at Pixar] in that we all miss the Tomorrowland that was promised us from the heyday of Disneyland," and wanted a "jet pack" feel. Pixar also studied the Disney Cruise Line and visited Las Vegas, which was helpful in understanding artificial lighting. Eggleston based his Axiom designs on the futuristic architecture of Santiago Calatrava. Eggleston divided the inside of the ship into three sections; the rear's economy class has a basic gray concrete texture with graphics keeping to the red, blue, and white of the BnL logo. The coach class with living/shopping spaces has "S" shapes as people are always looking for "what's around the corner". Stanton intended to have many colorful signs, but he realized this would overwhelm the audience and went with Eggleston's original idea of a small number of larger signs. The premier class is a large Zen-like spa with colors limited to turquoise, cream, and tan, and leads on to the captain's warm carpeted and wooded quarters and the sleek dark bridge. In keeping with the artificial Axiom, camera movements were modeled after those of the steadicam.

The use of live action was a stepping stone for Pixar, as Stanton was planning to make John Carter of Mars his next project. Storyboarder Derek Thompson noted introducing live action meant that they would make the rest of the film look even more realistic. Eggleston added that if the historical humans had been animated and slightly caricaturized, the audience then would not have been able to recognize how serious their devolution was. Stanton cast Fred Willard as the historical Buy n Large CEO because "[h]e's the most friendly and insincere car salesman I could think of." The CEO says "stay the course", which Stanton used because he thought it was funny and a "natural thing to say at the time". Industrial Light & Magic did the visual effects for these shots.

=== Animation ===
WALL-E went undeveloped during the 1990s partly because Stanton and Pixar were not confident enough yet to have a feature-length film with a main character that behaved like Luxo Jr., the Pixar lamp or R2-D2. Stanton explained there are two types of robots in cinema: "human[s] with metal skin", like the Tin Man, or "machine[s] with function" like Luxo and R2. He found the latter idea "powerful" because it allowed the audience to project personalities onto the characters, as they do with babies and pets: "You're compelled … you almost can't stop yourself from finishing the sentence 'Oh, I think it likes me! I think it's hungry! I think it wants to go for a walk!'" He added, "We wanted the audience to believe they were witnessing a machine that has come to life." The animators visited recycling stations to study machinery, and also met robot designers, visited NASA's Jet Propulsion Laboratory to study robots, watched a recording of a Mars rover, and borrowed a bomb detecting robot from the San Francisco Police Department. Simplicity was preferred in their performances as giving them too many movements would make them feel human.

Stanton wanted WALL-E to be a box and EVE to be like an egg. WALL-E's eyes were inspired by a pair of binoculars Stanton was given when watching the Oakland Athletics play against the Boston Red Sox. He "missed the entire inning" because he was distracted by them. The director was reminded of Buster Keaton and decided the robot would not need a nose or mouth. Stanton added a zoom lens to make WALL-E more sympathetic. Ralph Eggleston noted this feature gave the animators more to work with and gave the robot a childlike quality. Pixar's studies of trash compactors during their visits to recycling stations inspired his body. His tank treads were inspired by a wheelchair someone had developed that used treads instead of wheels. The animators wanted him to have elbows, but realized this was unrealistic because he is only designed to pull garbage into his body. His arms also looked flimsy when they did a test of him waving. Animation director Angus MacLane suggested they attach his arms to a track on the sides of his body to move them around, based on the inkjet printers his father designed. This arm design contributed to creating the character's posture, so if they wanted him to be nervous, they would lower them. Stanton was unaware of the similarities between WALL-E and Johnny 5 from Short Circuit until others pointed it out to him.

Stanton wanted EVE to be at the higher end of technology, and asked iPod designer Jonathan Ive to inspect her design. He was very impressed. Her eyes are modelled on Lite-Brite toys, but Pixar chose not to make them overly expressive as it would be too easy to have her eyes turn into hearts to express love or something similar. Her limited design meant the animators had to treat her like a drawing, relying on posing her body to express emotion. They also found her similar to a manatee or a narwhal because her floating body resembled an underwater creature. Auto was a conscious homage to HAL 9000 from 2001: A Space Odyssey, and the usage of The Blue Danube when Captain McCrea observes his daily tasks, also Also sprach Zarathustra for the showdown between Captain McCrea and Auto furthers that. The manner in which he hangs from a wall or ceiling gives him a threatening feel, like a spider. Originally, Auto was designed entirely differently, resembling EVE, but masculine and authoritative and SECUR-T was also a more aggressive patrol steward robot. The majority of the robot cast were formed with the Build-a-bot program, where different heads, arms and treads were combined in over a hundred variations. The humans were modelled on sea lions due to their blubbery bodies, as well as babies. The filmmakers noticed baby fat is a lot tighter than adult fat and copied that texture for the film's humans.

To animate their robots, the film's story crew and animation crew watched a Keaton and a Charlie Chaplin film every day for almost a year, and occasionally a Harold Lloyd picture. Afterwards, the filmmakers knew all emotions could be conveyed silently. Stanton cited Keaton's "great stone face" as giving them perseverance in animating a character with an unchanging expression. As he rewatched these, Stanton felt that filmmakers—since the advent of sound—relied on dialogue too much to convey exposition. The filmmakers dubbed the cockroach WALL-E keeps as a pet "Hal", in reference to silent film producer Hal Roach (as well as being an additional reference to HAL 9000). They also watched 2001: A Space Odyssey, The Black Stallion and Never Cry Wolf, films that had sound but were not reliant on dialogue. Stanton acknowledged Silent Running as an influence because its silent robots were a forerunner to the likes of R2-D2, and that the "hopeless romantic" Woody Allen also inspired WALL-E.

=== Sound ===
Producer Jim Morris recommended Ben Burtt as sound designer for WALL-E because Stanton kept using R2-D2 as the benchmark for the robots. Burtt had completed Star Wars: Episode III – Revenge of the Sith and told his wife he would no longer work on films with robots, but found WALL-E and its substitution of voices with sound "fresh and exciting". He recorded 2,500 sounds for the film, which was twice the average number for a Star Wars film, and a record in his career. Burtt began work in 2005, and experimented with filtering his voice for two years. Burtt described the robot voices as "like a toddler … universal language of intonation. 'Oh', 'Hm?', 'Huh!', you know?"

During production Burtt had the opportunity to look at the items used by Jimmy MacDonald, Disney's in-house sound designer for many of their classic films. Burtt used many of MacDonald's items on WALL-E. Because Burtt was not simply adding sound effects in post-production, the animators were always evaluating his new creations and ideas, which Burtt found an unusual experience. He worked in sync with the animators, returning their animation after adding the sounds to give them more ideas. Burtt would choose scientifically accurate sounds for each character, but if he could not find one that worked, he would choose a dramatic and unrealistic noise. Burtt would find hundreds of sounds by looking at concept art of characters, before he and Stanton pared it down to a distinct few for each robot.

Burtt saw a hand-cranked electrical generator while watching Island in the Sky, and bought an identical, unpacked device from 1950 on eBay to use for WALL-E moving around. Burtt also used an automobile self-starter for when WALL-E goes fast, and the sound of cars being wrecked at a demolition derby provided for WALL-E's compressing trash in his body. The Macintosh computer chime was used to signify when WALL-E has fully recharged his battery. For EVE, Burtt wanted her humming to have a musical quality. Burtt was only able to provide neutral or masculine voices, so Pixar employee Elissa Knight was asked to provide her voice for Burtt to electronically modify. Stanton deemed the sound effect good enough to properly cast her in the role. Burtt recorded a flying 10-foot-long (3.0 m) radio-controlled jet plane for EVE's flying, and for her plasma cannon, Burtt hit a slinky hung from a ladder with a timpani stick. He described it as a "cousin" to the blaster noise from Star Wars.

MacInTalk was used because Stanton "wanted Auto to be the epitome of a robot, cold, zeros & ones, calculating, and soulless [and] Stephen Hawking's kind of voice I thought was perfect." Additional sounds for the character were meant to give him a clockwork feel, to show he is always thinking and calculating.

Burtt had visited Niagara Falls in 1987 and used his recordings from his trip for the sounds of wind, and ran around a hall with a canvas bag up to record the sandstorm. For the scene where WALL-E flees from falling shopping carts, Burtt and his daughter went to a supermarket and placed a recorder in their cart. They crashed it around the parking lot and then let it tumble down a hill. To create Hal (WALL-E's pet cockroach)'s skittering, he recorded the clicking caused by taking apart and reassembling handcuffs.

=== Music ===
Thomas Newman recollaborated with Stanton on WALL-E since the two got along well on Finding Nemo, which gave Newman the Annie Award for Best Music in an Animated Feature. He began writing the score in 2005, in the hope that starting this task early would make him more involved with the finished film. But, Newman remarked that animation is so dependent on scheduling he should have begun work earlier on when Stanton and Reardon were writing the script. EVE's theme was arranged for the first time in October 2007. Her theme when played as she first flies around Earth originally used more orchestral elements, and Newman was encouraged to make it sound more feminine. Newman said Stanton had thought up many ideas for how he wanted the music to sound, and he generally followed them as he found scoring a partially silent film difficult. Stanton wanted the whole score to be orchestral, but Newman felt limited by this idea especially in scenes aboard the Axiom, and used electronics too.

A live-action clip from the Hello, Dolly! song "It Only Takes a Moment" inspires WALL-E to hold hands with EVE

Stanton originally wanted to juxtapose the opening shots of space with 1930s French swing music, but changed his mind after seeing The Triplets of Belleville (2003), not wanting to appear as if he were copying it. Stanton then thought about the song "Put On Your Sunday Clothes" from Hello, Dolly!, since he had portrayed the sidekick Barnaby Tucker in a 1980 high school production. Stanton found that the song was about two naive young men looking for love, which was similar to WALL-E's own hope for companionship. Jim Reardon, storyboard supervisor for the film, suggested WALL-E find the film on video, and Stanton included "It Only Takes a Moment" and the clip of the actors holding hands, because he wanted a visual way to show how WALL-E understands love and conveys it to EVE. Hello, Dolly! composer Jerry Herman allowed the songs to be used without knowing what for; when he saw the film, he found their incorporation into the story "genius". Coincidentally, Newman's uncle Lionel worked on Hello, Dolly!

Newman travelled to London to compose the end credits song "Down to Earth" with Peter Gabriel, who was one of Stanton's favorite musicians. Afterwards, Newman rescored some of the film to include the song's composition, so it would not sound intrusive when played. Louis Armstrong's rendition of "La Vie en rose" was used for a montage where WALL-E attempts to impress EVE on Earth. The script also specified using Bing Crosby's "Stardust" for when the two robots dance around the Axiom, but Newman asked if he could score the scene himself. A similar switch occurred for the sequence in which WALL-E attempts to wake EVE up through various means; originally, the montage would play with the instrumental version of "Raindrops Keep Fallin' on My Head", but Newman wanted to challenge himself and scored an original piece for the sequence.

== Themes ==
The film is recognized as a social criticism. Katherine Ellison asserts that "Americans produce nearly 400 million tons of solid waste per year but recycle less than a third of it, according to a recent Columbia University study." Landfills were filling up very rapidly worldwide, and predictions were made that the UK could run out of landfill space by 2017.

=== Environment, waste, and nostalgia ===
In the DVD commentary, Stanton said that he has been asked if it was his intention to make a movie about consumerism. His answer was it was not; it was a way to answer the question of how would the Earth get to the state where one robot would be left to continue the cleanup by itself. Nevertheless, some critics have noted an incongruity between the perceived pro-environmental and anti-consumerist messaging of the film, and the environmental impacts in the production and merchandising of the film.

In "WALL-E: from environmental adaption to sentimental nostalgia," Robin Murray and Joseph Heumann explain the important theme of nostalgia in this film. Nostalgia is clearly represented by human artifacts, left behind, that WALL-E collects and cherishes, for example Zippo lighters, hubcaps, and plastic sporks. These modern items that are used out of necessity are made sentimental through the lens of the bleak future of Earth. Nostalgia is also expressed through the musical score, as the film opens with a camera shot of outer space that slowly zooms into a waste filled Earth while playing "Put on Your Sunday Clothes", reflecting on simpler and happier times in human history. This film also expresses nostalgia through the longing of nature and the natural world, as it is the sight and feeling of soil, and the plant brought back to the space ship by EVE, that make the captain decide it is time for humans to move back to Earth. WALL-E expresses nostalgia also, by reflecting on romantic themes of older Disney and silent films.

Stanton describes the theme of the film as "irrational love defeats life's programming":

I realized the point I was trying to push with these two programmed robots was the desire for them to try and figure out what the point of living was … It took these really irrational acts of love to sort of discover them against how they were built … I realized that that's a perfect metaphor for real life. We all fall into our habits, our routines and our ruts, consciously or unconsciously to avoid living. To avoid having to do the messy part. To avoid having relationships with other people or dealing with the person next to us. That's why we can all get on our cell phones and not have to deal with one another. I thought, 'That's a perfect amplification of the whole point of the movie.' I wanted to run with science in a way that would sort of logically project that.

=== Technology ===
Stanton noted many commentators placed emphasis on the environmental aspect of humanity's complacency in the film, because "that disconnection is going to be the cause, indirectly, of anything that happens in life that's bad for humanity or the planet". Stanton said that by taking away effort to work, the robots also take away humanity's need to put effort into relationships.

Christian journalist Rod Dreher saw technology as the complicated villain of the film. The humans' artificial lifestyle on the Axiom has separated them from nature, making them "slaves of both technology and their own base appetites, and have lost what makes them human". Dreher contrasted the hardworking, dirt covered WALL-E with the sleek clean robots on the ship. However, it is the humans and not the robots who make themselves redundant. Humans on the ship and on Earth have overused robots and the ultra-modern technology. During the end credits, humans and robots are shown working alongside each other to renew the Earth. "WALL-E is not a Luddite film," he said. "It doesn't demonize technology. It only argues that technology is properly used to help humans cultivate their true nature—that it must be subordinate to human flourishing, and help move that along."

=== Religion ===
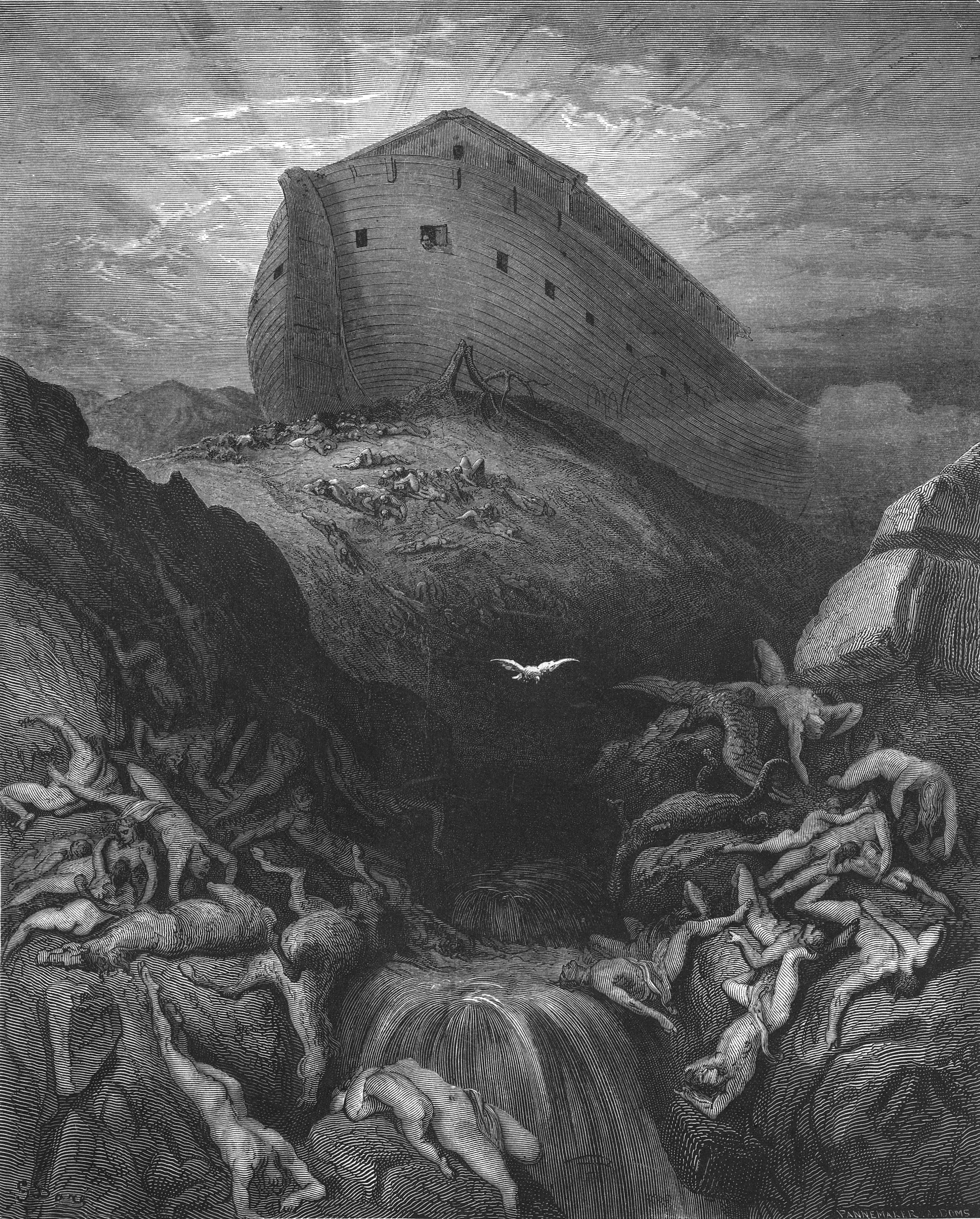
The Axiom and EVE have been compared to the legend of Noah's Ark and the dove that Noah sets forth from the Ark.

Stanton, who is a Christian, named EVE after the Biblical figure because WALL-E's loneliness reminded him of Adam, before God created his wife. Dreher noted EVE's biblical namesake and saw her directive as an inversion of that story; EVE uses the plant to tell humanity to return to Earth and move away from the "false god" of BnL and the lazy lifestyle it offers. In cohesion with the classical Christian viewpoint, WALL-E shows that work is what makes humans human. Whereas other sources would say that laziness and pleasure is paradise, WALL-E tries to show that that is not true. Dreher emphasized the false god parallels to BnL in a scene where a robot teaches infants "B is for Buy n Large, your very best friend", which he compared to modern corporations such as McDonald's creating brand loyalty in children. Megan Basham of World magazine felt the film criticizes the pursuit of leisure, whereas WALL-E in his stewardship learns to truly appreciate God's creation.

During writing, a Pixar employee noted to Jim Reardon that EVE was reminiscent of the dove with the olive branch from the story of Noah's Ark, and the story was reworked with EVE finding a plant to return humanity from its voyage. WALL-E himself has been compared to Prometheus, Sisyphus, and Butades: in an essay discussing WALL-E as representative of the artistic strive of Pixar itself, Hrag Vartanian compared WALL-E to Butades in a scene where the robot expresses his love for EVE by making a sculpture of her from spare parts. "The Ancient Greek tradition associates the birth of art with a Corinthian maiden who longing to preserve her lover's shadow traces it on the wall before he departed for war. The myth reminds us that art was born out of longing and often means more for the creator than the muse. In the same way Stanton and his Pixar team have told us a deeply personal story about their love of cinema and their vision for animation through the prism of all types of relationships."

== Release ==
WALL-E premiered at the Greek Theatre in Los Angeles on June 23, 2008. Continuing a Pixar tradition, the film was paired with a short film for its theatrical release, Presto. The film is dedicated to Justin Wright (1981–2008), a Pixar animator who had worked on Ratatouille and died of a heart attack before WALL-E's release. However, WALL-E is the first Pixar film to stop using the 1995 Pixar exclusive Walt Disney Pictures logo customized for the studio since Toy Story (1995).

Walt Disney Imagineering (WDI) built animatronic WALL-Es to promote the picture, which made appearances at Disneyland Resort, the Franklin Institute, the Miami Science Museum, the Seattle Center, and the Tokyo International Film Festival. Due to safety concerns, the 318 kg robots were always strictly controlled and WDI always needed to know exactly what they were required to interact with. For this reason, they generally refused to have their puppets meet and greet children at the theme parks in case a WALL-E trod on a child's foot. Those who wanted to take a photograph with the character had to make do with a cardboard cutout.

The film was denied a theatrical release in China until August 19, 2026.

In 2016, Jim Morris noted that the studio has no plans for a sequel, as they consider WALL-E a finished story with no need for continuation.

To promote the film, a website was created for Buy n Large, the featuring megacorporation. This website had fake press releases beginning in 2057, including "Wisconsin Mall Granted City Status," "BnL Announces Police Select." These fictional reports also quotes "analyst Richard Greenberg," which Multichannel News said sounds like Richard Greenfield who has analysed Disney. Greenfield said that "I would be sincerely flattered if there is a connection between anything Pixar creates and our research work."

=== Merchandise ===
Small quantities of merchandise were sold for WALL-E, as Cars items were still popular, and many manufacturers were more interested in Speed Racer, which was a successful product line despite the film's failure at the box office. Thinkway, which created the WALL-E toys, had previously made Toy Story dolls when other toy producers had not shown an interest. Among Thinkway's items were a WALL-E that danced when connected to a music player, a toy that could be taken apart and reassembled, and a groundbreaking remote control toy of him and EVE that had motion sensors that allowed them to interact with players. There were even plushies. The "Ultimate WALL·E" figures were not in stores until the film's home release in November 2008, at a retail price of almost $200, leading The Patriot-News to deem it an item for "hard-core fans and collectors only". On February 4, 2015, Lego announced that a WALL-E custom built by lead animator Angus MacLane was the latest design approved for mass production and release as part of Lego Ideas.

=== Manga ===
A manga adaptation of the film was written by Shiro Shirai and was originally released on December 15, 2008, in Japan to tie in to the film's Japanese release and later on April 10, 2018, in the US.

=== Video game ===
A platform game based on the movie was published by THQ and developed by Heavy Iron Studios for the PlayStation 3, Xbox 360, Wii version, Asobo Studio for the PlayStation 2 and PC version, Savage Entertainment for the PlayStation Portable version as well as a Nintendo DS game developed by Helixe. The PlayStation 3, Wii and Xbox 360 versions feature nine explorable levels. The Microsoft Windows, Mac OS X, PlayStation 2 and PlayStation Portable versions feature twenty-four levels, and the Nintendo DS features fourteen explorable worlds. The Wii is the only version of the game that features 3 head-to-head multiplayer modes, while the Nintendo DS version features co-op modes playable as WALL-E or EVE. As the player plays through the levels of the Nintendo DS version, they unlock clips from the movie viewable at any time. The Microsoft Windows, Mac OS X, PlayStation 2 and PlayStation Portable versions allow the player to use music to summon reject bots throughout the game. The story mode is based on an earlier version of the film with some creative liberties also taken, as the character's roles are different from the movie. GO-4 survives and tries to steal the plant when the Axiom lands on Earth, EVE is tasered by AUTO, WALL-E repairing EVE (EVE tries to repair WALL-E in the original) and WALL-E survives from getting crushed by the Holo-Detector. The reversal of EVE and WALL-E being damaged was actually intended to occur in the movie, but was later changed.

=== Home media ===
The film was released on Blu-ray Disc and DVD by Walt Disney Studios Home Entertainment on November 18, 2008. Various editions include the short film Presto, another short film BURN-E, the Leslie Iwerks documentary film The Pixar Story, shorts about the history of Buy n Large, behind-the-scenes special features, and a digital copy of the film that can be played through iTunes or Windows Media Player-compatible devices. This release sold 7,413,548 DVD units ($117,131,222) in total becoming the second-best-selling animated DVD among those released in 2008 in units sold (behind Kung Fu Panda), the best-selling animated feature in sales revenue, and the fifth-best-selling among all 2008 DVDs (behind The Dark Knight, Iron Man, Alvin and the Chipmunks and Kung Fu Panda).

WALL-E was released by Disney on 4K Ultra HD Blu-ray on March 3, 2020.

At the request of Stanton, Disney licensed WALL-E to the Criterion Collection in September 2022, which created a special 4K Blu-ray-Blu-ray combo edition of the film that was released on November 22, 2022, featuring the same 4K digital master used for Disney's original 4K Blu-ray release, but now presented in Dolby Vision and HDR10+ as approved by Stanton, along with additional special features. This makes it both the first Pixar and Walt Disney Pictures feature films released under the Criterion label. In its description for the release, Criterion viewed the film as an important work of both the animation medium and of cinema itself, saying that while "Transporting us simultaneously back to cinema's silent origins and light-years into the future, WALL-E is a soaring ode to the power of love and art to heal a dying world."

== Reception ==
=== Box office ===
WALL-E grossed $223.8 million in the United States and Canada and $308.7 million overseas, for a worldwide total of $532.5 million, making it the ninth-highest-grossing film of 2008.

In the US and Canada, WALL-E opened in 3,992 theaters on June 27, 2008. The film grossed $23.1 million on its opening day, the highest of all nine Pixar titles to date. During its opening weekend, it topped the box office with $63,087,526. This was the third-best opening weekend for a Pixar film after Finding Nemo and The Incredibles, and the second-best opening weekend among films released in June, behind Harry Potter and the Prisoner of Azkaban. The film grossed $38 million the following weekend, losing its first place to Hancock. WALL-E crossed the $200 million mark by August 3, during its sixth weekend.

WALL-E grossed over $10 million in Japan ($44,005,222), UK, Ireland and Malta ($41,215,600), France and the Maghreb region ($27,984,103), Germany ($24,130,400), Mexico ($17,679,805), Spain ($14,973,097), Australia ($14,165,390), Italy ($12,210,993), and Russia and the CIS ($11,694,482).

=== Critical response ===
The American Film Institute named WALL-E as one of the best films of 2008; the jury rationale states:

WALL-E proves to this generation and beyond that the film medium's only true boundaries are the human imagination. Writer/director Andrew Stanton and his team have created a classic screen character from a metal trash compactor who rides to the rescue of a planet buried in the debris that embodies the broken promise of American life. Not since Chaplin's "Little Tramp" has so much story—so much emotion—been conveyed without words. When hope arrives in the form of a seedling, the film blossoms into one of the great screen romances as two robots remind audiences of the beating heart in all of us that yearns for humanity—and love—in the darkest of landscapes.

On the review aggregator website Rotten Tomatoes, 95% of 258 critics' reviews are positive, with an average rating of 8.9/10. The website's consensus reads: "Wall-E's stellar visuals testify once again to Pixar's ingenuity, while its charming star will captivate younger viewers—and its timely story offers thought-provoking subtext." At Metacritic, which assigns a normalized rating to reviews from mainstream critics, the film has an average score of 95 out of 100 based on 39 reviews, indicating "universal acclaim". Audiences polled by CinemaScore gave the film an average rating of "A" on an A+ to F scale.

IndieWire named WALL-E the third-best film of the year based on their annual survey of 100 film critics, while Movie City News shows that WALL-E appeared in 162 different top 10 lists, out of 286 different critics lists surveyed, the most mentions on a top 10 list of any film released in 2008.

Richard Corliss of Time named WALL-E his favorite film of 2008 (and later of the decade), noting the film succeeded in "connect[ing] with a huge audience" despite the main characters' lack of speech and "emotional signifiers like a mouth, eyebrows, shoulders, [and] elbows". It "evoke[d] the splendor of the movie past" and he also compared WALL-E and EVE's relationship to the chemistry of Spencer Tracy and Katharine Hepburn. Other critics who named WALL-E their favorite film of 2008 included Tom Charity of CNN, Michael Phillips of the Chicago Tribune, Lisa Schwarzbaum of Entertainment Weekly, A. O. Scott of The New York Times, Christopher Orr of The New Republic, Ty Burr and Wesley Morris of The Boston Globe, Joe Morgenstern of The Wall Street Journal, and Anthony Lane of The New Yorker.

Todd McCarthy of Variety called the film "Pixar's ninth consecutive wonder", saying it was imaginative yet straightforward. He said it pushed the boundaries of animation by balancing esoteric ideas with more immediately accessible ones, and that the main difference between the film and other science fiction projects rooted in an apocalypse was its optimism. Kirk Honeycutt of The Hollywood Reporter declared that WALL-E surpassed the achievements of Pixar's previous eight features and was probably their most original film to date. He said it had the "heart, soul, spirit and romance" of the best silent films. Honeycutt said the film's definitive stroke of brilliance was in using a mix of archive film footage and computer graphics to trigger WALL-E's romantic leanings. He praised Burtt's sound design, saying "If there is such a thing as an aural sleight of hand, this is it."

Roger Ebert of the Chicago Sun-Times named WALL-E "an enthralling animated film, a visual wonderment, and a decent science-fiction story" and said the scarcity of dialogue would allow it to "cross language barriers" in a manner appropriate to the global theme, and noted it would appeal to adults and children. He praised the animation, describing the color palette as "bright and cheerful … and a little bit realistic", and that Pixar managed to generate a "curious" regard for the WALL-E, comparing his "rusty and hard-working and plucky" design favorably to more obvious attempts at creating "lovable" lead characters. He said WALL-E was concerned with ideas rather than spectacle, saying it would trigger stimulating "little thoughts for the younger viewers." He named it as one of his twenty favorite films of 2008 and argued it was "the best science-fiction movie in years".

The film was interpreted as tackling a topical, ecologically-minded agenda, though McCarthy said it did so with a lightness of touch that granted the viewer the ability to accept or ignore the message. Kyle Smith of the New York Post, wrote that by depicting future humans as "a flabby mass of peabrained idiots who are literally too fat to walk", WALL-E was darker and more cynical than any major Disney feature film he could recall. He compared the humans to the patrons of Disney's theme parks and resorts, adding, "I'm also not sure I've ever seen a major corporation spend so much money to issue an insult to its customers." Maura Judkis of U.S. News & World Report questioned whether this depiction of "frighteningly obese humans" would resonate with children and make them prefer to "play outside rather than in front of the computer, to avoid a similar fate".

A few notable critics have argued that the film is vastly overrated, claiming it failed to "live up to such blinding, high-wattage enthusiasm", and that there were "chasms of boredom watching it", in particular "the second and third acts spiraled into the expected". Other labels included "preachy" and "too long". Child reviews sent into CBBC were mixed, some citing boredom and an inadequate storyline.

Several conservative commentators criticized the film. Shannen W. Coffin of National Review said that WALL-E is "leftist propaganda about the evils of mankind". Greg Pollowitz of National Review called the film "a 90-minute lecture on the dangers of over consumption, big corporations, and the destruction of the environment". Jonah Goldberg said that while the film was "fascinating and at-times brilliant", he added that it is also "Malthusian fear mongering". Glenn Beck said that "I can't wait to teach my kids how we've destroyed the Earth … Pixar is teaching. I can't wait. You know if your kid has ever come home and said, 'Dad, how come we use so much styrofoam,' oh, this is the movie for you."

Patrick J. Ford of The American Conservative said WALL-E's conservative critics missed lessons in the film that he felt appealed to traditional conservatism. He argued that the mass consumerism in the film was not shown to be a product of big business, but of too close a tie between big business and big government: "The government unilaterally provided its citizens with everything they needed, and this lack of variety led to Earth's downfall." Responding to Coffin's claim that the film points out the evils of humankind, Ford argued the only evils depicted were those that resulted from losing touch with our own humanity and that fundamental conservative representations such as the farm, the nuclear family unit, and "wholesome entertainment" were seen as "beautiful and desirable." by the human characters. He concluded, "By steering conservative families away from WALL-E, these commentators are doing their readers a great disservice."

Director Terry Gilliam praised the film as "A stunning bit of work. The scenes on what was left of planet Earth are just so beautiful: one of the great silent movies. And the most stunning artwork! It says more about ecology and society than any live-action film—all the people on their loungers floating around, brilliant stuff. Their social comment was so smart and right on the button."

Archaeologists have commented on the themes of human evolution that the film explores. Ben Marwick has written how the character of WALL-E resembles an archaeologist with his methodical collection and classification of quotidian human artefacts. He is shown facing a typological dilemma of classifying a spork as either a fork or spoon, and his nostalgic interest in the human past further demonstrated by his attachment to repeated viewings of the 1969 film Hello, Dolly!. Marwick notes that the film features major human evolutionary transitions such as obligate bipedalism (captain of the spaceship struggles with the autopilot to gain control of the vessel) and the invention of agriculture, as part of watershed moments in the story of the film. According to Marwick, one prominent message of the film "appears to be that the envelopment by technology that the humans in WALL-E experience paradoxically results in physical and cultural devolution." Scholars such as Ian Tattersall and Steve Jones have similarly discussed scenarios where elements of modern technology (such as medicine) may have caused human evolution to slow or stop.

In 2021, WALL-E became the second Pixar feature film (after Toy Story), as well as the second animated film in the 21st century after Shrek, to be selected for preservation in the United States National Film Registry by the Library of Congress as being "culturally, historically, or aesthetically significant".

=== Accolades ===
WALL-E won the Academy Award for Best Animated Feature and was nominated for Best Original Screenplay, Best Original Score, Best Original Song, Sound Editing, and Sound Mixing at the 81st Academy Awards. Walt Disney Pictures also pushed for an Academy Award for Best Picture nomination, but it was not nominated, sparking controversy over whether the Academy deliberately restricted WALL-E to the Best Animated Feature category. Film critic Peter Travers remarked, "If there was ever a time where [sic] an animated feature deserved to be nominated for best picture it's Wall-E." 1991's Beauty and the Beast was the first and only animated film nominated for Best Picture at the time. A reflective Stanton stated he was not disappointed the film was restricted to the Best Animated Film nomination because he was overwhelmed by the film's positive reception, and eventually "The line [between live-action and animation] is just getting so blurry that I think with each proceeding year, it's going to be tougher and tougher to say what's an animated movie and what's not an animated movie."

WALL-E made a healthy appearance at the various 2008 end-of-the-year awards circles, particularly in the Best Picture category, where animated films are often overlooked. It has won the award, or the equivalent of it, from the Boston Society of Film Critics (tied with Slumdog Millionaire), the Chicago Film Critics Association, the Central Ohio Film Critics awards, the Online Film Critics Society, and most notably the Los Angeles Film Critics Association, where it became the first animated feature to win the prestigious award. It was named as one of 2008's ten best films by the American Film Institute and the National Board of Review of Motion Pictures.

It won Best Animated Feature Film at the 66th Golden Globe Awards, 81st Academy Awards, and the Broadcast Film Critics Association Awards 2008. It was nominated for several awards at the 2009 Annie Awards, including Best Feature Film, Animated Effects, Character Animation, Direction, Production design, Storyboarding and Voice acting (for Ben Burtt); but was beaten out by Kung Fu Panda in every category. It won Best Animated Feature at the 62nd British Academy Film Awards and was also nominated there for Best Music and Sound. Thomas Newman and Peter Gabriel won two Grammy Awards for "Down to Earth" and "Define Dancing". It won all three awards it was nominated for by the Visual Effects Society: Best Animation, Best Character Animation (for WALL-E and EVE in the truck) and Best Effects in the Animated Motion Picture categories. It became the first animated film to win Best Editing for a Comedy or Musical from the American Cinema Editors. In 2009, Stanton, Reardon, and Docter won the Nebula Award, beating The Dark Knight and the Stargate Atlantis episode "The Shrine". It won Best Animated Film and was nominated for Best Director at the Saturn Awards.

At the British National Movie Awards, which is voted for by the public, it won Best Family Film. It was also voted Best Feature Film at the British Academy Children's Awards. WALL-E was listed at No. 63 on Empire's online poll of the 100 greatest movie characters, conducted in 2008. In early 2010, Time ranked WALL-E No. 1 in "Best Movies of the Decade". In Sight & Sound magazine's 2012 poll of the greatest films of all time, WALL-E is the second-highest-ranking animated film behind My Neighbor Totoro (1988), while tying with the film Spirited Away (2001) at 202nd overall. In a 2016 BBC poll of international critics, it was voted the 29th-greatest film since 2000. In 2021, members of Writers Guild of America West (WGAW) and Writers Guild of America, East (WGAE) ranked its screenplay 35th in WGA’s 101 Greatest Screenplays of the 21st Century (so far). In June 2025, actors Alden Ehrenreich, David Krumholtz and Nathan Lane, and comedians Paula Poundstone and Phoebe Robinson, all cited the film as among their favorites of the 21st century. It also ranked number 34 on The New York Times' list of "The 100 Best Movies of the 21st Century" and number 44 on the "Readers' Choice" edition of the list. In July 2025, it ranked number 47 on Rolling Stone's list of "The 100 Best Movies of the 21st Century."

== Robotic recreations ==
In 2012, Mike McMaster, an American robotics hobbyist, began working on his own model of WALL-E. The final product was built with more moving parts than the WALL-E which roams around Disneyland. McMaster's four-foot robot made an appearance at the Walt Disney Family Museum and was featured during the opening week of Tested.com a project headed up by Jamie Hyneman and Adam Savage of MythBusters. Since WALL-E's creation, Mike and the popular robot have made dozens of appearances at various events.

In the same year, Mike Senna completed his own WALL-E build. He also created an EVE. They were present at a photo op at Disney's D23 Expo 2015.

== See also ==
- Mars Cube One, consisting of two nanospacecraft, MarCO-A and MarCO-B, which are nicknamed WALL-E and EVE

== Bibliography ==
- Hauser, Tim (2008). The Art of WALL-E. San Francisco: Chronicle Books. ISBN 978-0-8118-6235-6. OCLC 377889575.
- Mattie, Sean (Winter 2014). "WALL·E on the Problem of Technology". Perspectives on Political Science. 43 (1): 12–20. doi:10.1080/10457097.2013.784576. ISSN 1045-7097. S2CID 144206190.
