= Toy Story of Terror! =

2013 Halloween television special

- ABC World Premiere release poster
- Genre: Comedy horror
- Written by: Angus MacLane
- Directed by: Angus MacLane
- Voices of: Joan Cusack; Carl Weathers; Tim Allen; Tom Hanks; Stephen Tobolowsky; Don Rickles; Wallace Shawn; Timothy Dalton; Kristen Schaal
- Music by: Michael Giacchino
- Country of origin: United States
- Original language: English

Production
- Producer: Galyn Susman
- Editor: Axel Geddes
- Running time: 21 minutes
- Production companies: Pixar Animation Studios; Disney Television Animation; Walt Disney Pictures

Original release
- Network: ABC
- Release: October 16, 2013

Toy Story of Terror! is an American animated Halloween television special produced by Pixar Animation Studios and Disney Television Animation and released by Walt Disney Pictures, based on the Toy Story franchise. It is set after the events of Toy Story 3 and before Toy Story Toons. It premiered on the American television network ABC on October 16, 2013. The special was written and directed by Angus MacLane, produced by Galyn Susman, with Joan Cusack, Tom Hanks, Tim Allen, Don Rickles, Wallace Shawn, Timothy Dalton, and Kristen Schaal reprising their respective roles of Jessie, Woody, Buzz Lightyear, Mr. Potato Head, Rex, Mr. Pricklepants, and Trixie with Carl Weathers as Combat Carl and Stephen Tobolowsky as the motel manager. Michael Giacchino composed the music for the special. The film's soundtrack was released on October 15, 2013, on Amazon.com and iTunes in digital format.

The special follows the toys on a road trip, when a flat tire leads Bonnie and her mother to spend the night in a roadside motel. After Mr. Potato Head goes missing, the others begin looking for him, but they find themselves caught up in a mysterious sequence of events that leads them to a big conspiracy.

== Plot ==
One month after the events of Toy Story 3, Bonnie and her mother are on a road trip to visit Bonnie's grandmother. Bonnie has brought Woody, Buzz Lightyear, Jessie, Rex, Mr. Pricklepants, Mr. Potato Head, and Trixie with her. In the trunk of the vehicle, the toys are watching a horror film on a portable DVD player. When the car gets a flat tire, Bonnie and her mother must spend the night at the Sleep Well roadside motel, as a tow truck cannot be sent out until the next morning.

Once Bonnie and her mother are asleep, the toys exit Bonnie's bag to explore the motel room, but Mr. Potato Head goes missing. At this point, Mr. Pricklepants begins to narrate ongoing events as if it were part of an actual horror film, considering himself an expert. The toys search through the motel for Mr. Potato Head, but then one by one, they are taken by an iguana named Mr. Jones, leaving only Jessie. In a bathroom, Jessie meets an action figure named Combat Carl, who was separated from his owner, Billy. Combat Carl urges Jessie to flee to her owner for safety, but she insists on trying to rescue her friends. The iguana returns to take Combat Carl, then Jessie. The iguana is revealed to be owned by the motel's manager, Ron, who has trained Mr. Jones to steal unattended toys and other items from motel guests so he can sell them in online auctions. Ron puts Jessie in the back room of his office, in a glass cabinet containing her friends, Combat Carl, and other stolen toys.

As morning approaches, a buyer purchases Woody online and Ron packs him into a box. Jessie is sold soon after, but Ron is distracted by the arrival of the tow truck and Jessie is left on the counter. A delivery lady takes Woody's box out to her truck, and Combat Carl tells Jessie that their only hope to rescue Woody and escape is for Jessie to travel to the truck in a box. Terrified, Jessie insists that she cannot enter a box, but Combat Carl helps her gain confidence. Once inside the truck, she frees herself and Woody. They return to the office, where Bonnie and her mother are checking out. Mr. Jones attacks Jessie, but Mr. Potato Head's hand manages to open a curtain, revealing the stolen toys to Bonnie and her mother, who threatens to turn Ron over to the police. Bonnie retrieves her toys, and the trip is resumed.

As the credits roll, the rest of the stolen toys, who managed to escape while Ron was distracted, board a delivery truck determined to return to their owners. Meanwhile, the police arrive at the motel to arrest Ron, who then attempts to flee with the police cruiser, only to crash into the motel's sign and run off.

== Cast ==
- Joan Cusack as Jessie, a cowgirl doll from the 1955-1957 marionette TV show Woody's Roundup.
- Carl Weathers as Combat Carl and Combat Carl Jr.
- Stephen Tobolowsky as Ronald the Motel Manager
- Tom Hanks as Sheriff Woody, a cowboy doll from his own 1955-1957 marionette TV show Woody's Roundup.
- Tim Allen as Buzz Lightyear, a Space Ranger action figure from Andy Davis' favorite movie.
- Timothy Dalton as Mr. Pricklepants
- Wallace Shawn as Rex
- Kristen Schaal as Trixie
- Don Rickles as Mr. Potato Head
- Kate McKinnon as PEZ Cat
- Emily Hahn as Bonnie Anderson
- Lori Alan as Bonnie's Mom
- Peter Sohn as Transitron
- Dawnn Lewis as Delivery Lady
- Jason Topolski as Vampire and Tow Truck Guy
- Ken Marino as Pocketeer
- Christian Roman as Old Timer
- Laraine Newman as Betsy
- Angus MacLane as Officer Wilson
- Josh Cooley as Officer Phillips
- Dee Bradley Baker as Mr. Jones
- Tara Strong as Ron's Computer

== Production ==
The special was originally intended as a 7 minute short film as part of the Toy Story Toons series.

== Soundtrack ==
Toy Story of Terror!

Soundtrack album by Michael Giacchino
- Released: October 15, 2013
- Recorded: 2013
- Genre: Film score
- Length: 20:58
- Label: Walt Disney

Michael Giacchino film scores chronology
Star Trek Into Darkness (2013)	Toy Story of Terror! (2013)	Dawn of the Planet of the Apes (2014)

The film's score was composed by Michael Giacchino. The soundtrack was released by Walt Disney Records on October 15, 2013.

Track listing

All music is composed by Michael Giacchino.

No.	Title	Length
1.	"The Suspension Is Killing Me"	0:44
2.	"Thinking Inside the Box"	1:40
3.	"Motel Me a Scary Story"	1:07
4.	"I've Got a Bag Feeling About This"	1:45
5.	"Why'd It Have to Be Crawl Spaces?"	1:15
6.	"The Ballad of Combat Carl"	2:33
7.	"Iguana Be Kidding Me"	4:03
8.	"Nobody Puts Jessie in the Box"	1:33
9.	"Rock 'Em Box 'Em Robots"	1:31
10.	"Pink Peanut Panic"	1:23
11.	"World's Worst Curtain Call"	2:31
12.	"FedExit (End Credits)"	0:53
Total length:		20:58

== Critical reception ==
Toy Story of Terror! has received critical acclaim. According to review aggregator website Rotten Tomatoes, 94% of critics have given it a positive review based on 17 reviews, with an average rating of 8.04/10. At Metacritic, the special has a weighted average score of 80 out of 100 based on 7 critics, indicating "generally favorable reviews". TV Guide writer Matt Roush said that "ABC's Toy Story of Terror! is a delightful half-hour vignette of gags, action and self-empowerment, couching its never-give-up message in terrific non-stop entertainment." Brian Lowry of Variety wrote "Toy Story of Terror! is about a quarter the length of the average animated feature, but everything else here could easily be mistaken for the bigscreen version, from the pacing and humor to Michael Giacchino's score." Pittsburgh Post-Gazette contributor Rob Owen called it "a small adventure befitting the 30-minute running time but it's also clever in the way it ultimately puts the "Toy Story" characters in a recognizable situation, which is similar to the big-screen movies." According to Neil Genzlinger from The New York Times, "Once the annual avalanche of Halloween-themed episodes, specials and movies overtakes TV, you probably don't expect to be using the word 'charming' very often. But charming perfectly describes one such entry, Toy Story of Terror!" Writing for The A.V. Club, Emily VanDerWerff stated "The Toy Story franchise has always operated best with a note of existential panic, and there's some of that here, but it feels like the special leans awfully hard on the films that gave rise to it." Robert Lloyd of Los Angeles Times said "Themes from earlier Toy Story movies are also recycled, which should bother no one. Although Woody and Buzz get their screen time–with Jessie, they are the 'Jules et Jim' of computer-animated cartoons about sentient playthings—it is the plucky cowgirl, facing her fears, whose story this is."

== Home media ==
Toy Story of Terror! was released on Blu-ray and DVD on August 19, 2014. It includes the three Toy Story Toons shorts: Hawaiian Vacation, Small Fry, and Partysaurus Rex. On October 23, 2020, the special made a surprise release onto Disney+.

== See also ==
- List of films set around Halloween
