= WALL-E (character) =

Main character of WALL-E

- WALL-E character
- First appearance: WALL-E (2008)
- Created by: Andrew Stanton; Jim Reardon; Pete Docter
- Voiced by: Ben Burtt

In-universe information
- Full name: "Waste Allocation Load Lifter: Earth-Class"
- Species: Robot
- Significant other: EVE

WALL-E (short for Waste Allocation Load Lifter: Earth-Class) is the main protagonist of the 2008 Disney/Pixar animated film of the same name. He is primarily voiced by Ben Burtt.

WALL-E was created by director Andrew Stanton and writer Jim Reardon. In the film, he is a solitary robot on a future, uninhabitable, deserted Earth in 2805, left to clean up garbage. He is visited by a probe sent by the starship Axiom, a robot called EVE (short for Extraterrestrial Vegetation Evaluator), with whom he falls in love and pursues across the galaxy.

== Development ==
Director, Andrew Stanton made WALL-E a trash compactor as the idea was instantly understandable, and because it was a low-status menial job that made him sympathetic. Stanton also liked the imagery of stacked cubes of garbage.

Before they turned their attention to other projects, Stanton and John Lasseter thought about having WALL-E fall in love, as it was the necessary progression away from loneliness.

WALL-E went undeveloped during the 1990s partly because Stanton and Pixar were not confident enough yet to have a feature-length film with a main character that behaved like Luxo Jr.—the Pixar lamp—or R2-D2 from Star Wars. Stanton explained there are two types of robots in cinema: "human[s] with metal skin", like the Tin Man, or "machine[s] with function" like Luxo and R2. He found the latter idea "powerful" because it allowed the audience to project personalities onto the characters, as they do with babies and pets: "You're compelled ... you almost can't stop yourself from finishing the sentence 'Oh, I think it likes me! I think it's hungry! I think it wants to go for a walk!'" He added, "We wanted the audience to believe they were witnessing a machine that has come to life." The animators visited recycling stations to study machinery, and also met robot designers, visited NASA's Jet Propulsion Laboratory to study robots, watched a recording of a Mars rover, and borrowed a bomb detecting robot from the San Francisco Police Department. Simplicity was preferred in their performances as giving them too many movements would make them feel human.

Stanton wanted WALL-E to be a box and EVE to be like an egg. WALL-E's eyes were inspired by a pair of binoculars Stanton was given when watching the Oakland Athletics play against the Boston Red Sox. He "missed the entire inning" because he was distracted by them. The director was reminded of Buster Keaton and decided the robot would not need a nose or mouth. Stanton added a zoom lens to make WALL-E more sympathetic. Ralph Eggleston noted this feature gave the animators more to work with and gave the robot a childlike quality.

Sound designer, Ben Burtt saw a hand-cranked electrical generator while watching Island in the Sky, and bought an identical, unpacked device from 1950 on eBay to use for WALL-E moving around. Burtt also used an automobile self-starter for when WALL-E goes fast, and the sound of cars being wrecked at a demolition derby provided for WALL-E's compressing trash in his body. The Macintosh computer chime was used to signify when WALL-E has fully recharged his battery.

== Appearances ==
=== WALL-E ===
In the year 2110, rising toxicity levels make life unsustainable on Earth. After all the humans leave Earth aboard giant spaceships, millions of WALL-E robots and a lesser amount of mobile incinerators are left behind to clean up the dirty planet. But after 700 years, the incinerators and all but one WALL-E robot have failed. This last operational WALL-E (N. 62675) is still hard at work, blissfully unaware of the futility of his situation. During this time, he befriends a cockroach (whom he names Hal). Though he continues obeying his directive to compact trash, as he develops curiosity, he begins saving odds and ends that fascinate him. He hides out from sandstorms and rain in his truck, spending his time sorting his collection, the pride of which is an old Betamax copy of the musical Hello, Dolly!. To keep himself going, he has taken to salvaging parts from his inoperative counterparts.

One day after work, he finds a mysterious red dot that zips away from him. He follows, not noticing that there are several others behind him. Once the red thing stops, he tries to grab it, but it turns out to be a light from a massive ship coming down on him. He narrowly escapes by digging a hole into the ground to hide in. Once the ship lands, it deposits EVE, a robot sent back to Earth to evaluate the soil to check for signs of ongoing photosynthesis, proof that life is sustainable again. WALL-E is fascinated with this new robot and is excited to see someone else besides himself for the first time in hundreds of years, and soon falls in love with her, wishing to hold her hand like he'd seen done in his favorite movie. He attempts to impress her many times, but due to EVE dedicated to her mission, he fails but refuses to give up. Despite their hostile encounter, EVE soon begins to befriend WALL-E when they formally introduced each other and their directives, and when WALL-E saves her from a sandstorm. He shows her a plant he had found earlier, which she immediately takes and stores in her cavity before going into standby mode. Alarmed, WALL-E tries to wake her inert body but fails, so for the next several days, he protects EVE, taking her out on "dates". Eventually, he gives up on her awakening and attempts to return to work, but finds he cannot focus on his directive; EVE is all he cares about.

When he sees her ship return to pick her up, WALL-E races to get back to EVE. Making sure Hal stays put, he clings to its hull as it travels through space to the Axiom. WALL-E is amazed to see the wonders of space for the first time, also taking the chance to recharge while in range of the sun. Once at the Axiom, he encounters the cleaner bot M-O, who tries to clean him up. WALL-E engages in a cat-and-mouse chase, pursuing the cart robot carrying EVE to the bridge, not realizing that M-O is following his trail to clean up the dirt his treads left behind. On reaching the bridge, WALL-E hides from sight but eventually gets discovered by EVE, then Captain McCrea. EVE, who discovers the plant to be missing, presumes WALL-E to be the thief. They are then both sent to maintenance. WALL-E mistakes the diagnostics to be hurting her and breaks out to try and help her, accidentally blasting the power console with her blaster and freeing other malfunctioning robots.

After a chase through the Axiom's halls evading security, EVE tries to send WALL-E home in an escape pod, but he refuses to leave her. They hide when GO-4 arrives and places the missing plant in the pod, which clears EVE's suspicions of the plant. WALL-E tries to retrieve it only for the pod to be jettisoned into space, set to self-destruct. Storing the plant in his chest and grabbing a fire extinguisher, he escapes the pod just before it explodes. EVE is so grateful he saved the plant that she kisses him much to his surprise, then they share a space dance before re-entering the Axiom.

Once inside, WALL-E offers to help EVE, but she tells him to stay put near the pool while she goes up the garbage chute to deliver the plant to Captain McCrea. Soon WALL-E becomes anxious with waiting and climbs up the chute, in the process saving the plant from falling. After a fight with the plant, he is electrocuted by Auto and sent down to the garbage depot, along with EVE. They are compacted with other garbage by WALL-E's bigger counterparts, the WALL•As. EVE struggles to free him before they are sucked in the vacuum of space. However, they are prevented from being sucked into the vacuum, thanks to M-O and the WALL-As shutting the airlock. EVE, who had witnessed her security files of WALL-E protecting her, changes her directive to caring for him.

WALL-E then shows his motherboard that is damaged beyond repair to EVE and tells her that his replacements are halfway across the galaxy. This finally makes EVE agree to fulfill her original directive if only to get him home so he can get repaired. With the Captain's guidance, they make their way to the holo-detector, which, when inserted with a plant, will send the Axiom back to Earth. But Auto, still obeying a 700-year-old directive issued by Buy n Large CEO Shelby Forthright, is determined to stop them by tilting the ship. WALL-E drops the plant when he sideswipes the holo-detector, and Auto proceeds to close the holo-detector for good. WALL-E wedges himself underneath the holo-detector to keep it from shutting and gets crushed while EVE is occupied with saving the humans from being crushed by a train. The Captain finally relieves Auto of duty by switching Auto to Manual mode, which shuts Auto down. After Auto is defeated and the Captain rights the Axiom, EVE rushes over to the holo-detector and attempts to pry it open to free WALL-E, but to no avail. She quickly calls the other robots and humans to retrieve the plant. M-O finds the plant, and with help from the humans and robots lined up, EVE catches the plant and places it into the holo-detector, activating the device. EVE pulls a severely damaged WALL-E out as the Axiom initiates a hyperjump straight to Earth.

As soon as they land, EVE rushes WALL-E back to his truck, where she quickly repairs him and recharges him. WALL-E wakes back up, but his memory is wiped clean and he reverts to his original programming and directive, oblivious to EVE, Hal, and his collection. EVE attempts to help him remember, but when all her efforts fail, she becomes heartbroken and sadly holds his hand like he had wanted and gives him a farewell "kiss". As EVE prepares to leave in sorrow, WALL-E's grip on her hand tightens. His eyes then adjust, and he calls her name, making her overjoyed. They kiss and the power of love reboots his memory. WALL-E is surprised upon waking up to see that they are holding hands. WALL-E and EVE help the Captain and Axiom passengers start a new life on Earth, and they spend the rest of their lives together helping restore the Earth back to normal.

== Characteristics ==
=== Design ===
WALL-E has twin, extending, hydraulic arm shovels with articulated fingers mounted on U-shaped tracks to his sides. His locomotion is achieved with treads sporting four independently actuated sprockets for stability. The tracks on his treads can be removed by unclipping the hinge pins on a single joint. His front opens up his body cavity in which he gathers and compresses trash. His head contains his audio-visual sensors mounted on a long, articulated neck, enabling him to see in any direction. All his extremities — arms, treads, and head — retract back into his cube-shaped body for easier storage, referred to as "boxing" in the movie script. He reverts to this shape whenever sleeping (or hiding). A hook on his back served some unknown purpose (perhaps for self-storage aboard the transport). He now uses it to carry his BnL Igloo-style cooler to work, which holds a pair of hand tools and a can of spray lubricant, likely for self-maintenance on the job site, but also fills it full of interesting bits of trash he picks up at work so he can take them home. His chassis is reinforced, mostly to give him the strength necessary to compact trash in his body cavity. As such, he is able to survive most environmental dangers, including long falls, extreme heat, the vacuum of space, and being trapped in a hydraulic actuator much larger than himself.

While it is clear that WALL-E could have been made with more sophisticated technology (such as the LED eyes of EVE and several other kinds of robots aboard the Axiom), the design choices made for WALL-E favor durability and most importantly, the easy replacement of parts. This allowed WALL-E to keep himself fully functional over his seven centuries of service.

His main coloring is the same shade of yellow that is used for construction vehicles.

=== Personality ===
Because WALL-E has been alone for 700 years, he has developed a "glitch": sentience and a personality. He has become very curious and he keeps anything interesting he can find. Even though he still obediently follows his directive, WALL-E can get distracted, collecting the trash rather than compacting it. His most prized possession, Hello, Dolly!, teaches him how to hold hands, which he considers the way to say, "I love you."

He has become very lonely, having nobody but Hal as his company, and is beginning to wonder whether there is more to life than his directive. So when he meets EVE, he quickly falls in love with her. WALL-E is very protective of EVE. When she shuts down after getting the plant, WALL-E places her on top of his transport (thinking she is charged by solar energy just as he is) and protects her from the weather waiting for her to "recharge". At the repair center, he mistakes the equipment there as trying to torture her and rushes to her aid. When EVE was frustrated and discomforted by his interventions, he is quickly remorseful about it. He also knows when to back out in dangerous situations and let EVE handle it, but still insists on following and helping her complete her directive.

When he first learns about love, he is fascinated and wanted to find someone he loves for himself. When around EVE, he attempts to demonstrate his love for her in the best way he can, even when she didn't reciprocate her feelings at first. As the film progresses however, WALL-E is able to understand the importance of how love isn't just about holding hands, but taking time to know each other, trusting people and accepting who they are and what they are meant for.

== Reception ==
Reviewing the movie, Kirk Honeycutt of The Hollywood Reporter said the film's definitive stroke of brilliance was in using a mix of archive film footage and computer graphics to trigger WALL-E's romantic leanings. He also praised Ben Burtt's sound design, saying "If there is such a thing as an aural sleight of hand, this is it."

== Recreations ==
In 2012, Mike McMaster, an American robotics hobbyist, began working on his own model of WALL-E. The final product was built with more moving parts than the WALL-E which roams around Disneyland. Alongside this, both WALL-E and EVE have a presence at all the Disney Parks and Resorts as statues in the Tomorrowland areas. McMaster's four-foot robot made an appearance at the Walt Disney Family Museum and was featured during the opening week of Tested.com a project headed up by Jamie Hyneman and Adam Savage of MythBusters. Since WALL-E's creation, Mike and the popular robot have made dozens of appearances at various events.

In the same year, Mike Senna completed his own WALL-E build.
