= PlainTalk =

Range of speech synthesis and recognition technologies from Apple Inc.

PlainTalk is the collective name for several speech synthesis (MacinTalk) and speech recognition technologies developed by Apple Inc. In 1990, Apple invested in speech recognition technology, hiring many researchers in the field. The result was "PlainTalk", released with the AV models in the Macintosh Quadra series from 1993. It was made a standard system component in System 7.1.2, and has since been shipped on all PowerPC, Intel, Apple silicon, and some 68k Macintoshes.

== Software ==
=== Speech synthesis ===
==== Technology ====
Apple's text-to-speech uses diphones. Compared to other methods of synthesizing speech, it is not very resource-intensive, but limits how natural the speech synthesis can be. American English and Spanish versions have been available, but since the advent of Mac OS X, Apple has shipped only American English voices, relying on third-party suppliers such as Acapela Group to supply voices for other languages (in OS X 10.7, Apple licensed a lot of third-party voices and made them available for download within the Speech control panel).

An application programming interface known as the Speech Manager enables third-party developers to use speech synthesis in their applications. There are various control sequences that can be used to fine-tune the intonation and rhythm. The volume, pitch and rate of the speech can be configured as well, allowing for singing.

Input to the synthesizer can be controlled explicitly using a special phoneme alphabet.

==== Original MacinTalk ====
MacinTalk 1 demo

The initial Macintosh text-to-speech engine, MacinTalk (named by Denise Chandler), was used by Apple in the 1984 introduction of the Macintosh in which the computer announced itself to the world (and poked fun at the weight of an IBM computer). While it was incorporated into the Macintosh's operating system, it was not officially supported by Apple (though programming information was made available through an Apple Technical Note). MacinTalk was developed by Joseph Katz and Mark Barton who later founded SoftVoice, Inc. which currently markets TTS engines for Windows, Linux and embedded platforms. MacinTalk used direct access to the original Macintosh sound hardware and all attempts to license the source code by Apple to update it for newer Macs failed.

==== MacinTalk 2 ====
MacinTalk 2 demo featuring the Mr. Hughes and Marvin voices

Eventually, Apple released a supported speech synthesis system, called MacinTalk 2. It supports any Macintosh running System Software 6.0.7 or later. It remained the recommended version for slower machines even after the release of MacinTalk 3 and Pro.

==== MacinTalk 3, Pro ====
MacinTalk 3 introduced a great variety of voices. Apart from the standard adult voices "Ralph", "Fred" and "Kathy", and children's voices like "Princess" (renamed "Superstar" in macOS Ventura) and "Junior", various novelty voices were included, like "Whisper", "Zarvox" (a robotic voice with melodic background sounds, with a similar voice called "Trinoids" also included), "Cellos" (a voice that sang its text to an Edvard Grieg tune, otherwise known as "In the Hall of the Mountain King" with similarly singing voices like "Good News", "Bad News", "Pipe Organ"), "Albert" (a hoarse-sounding voice), "Bells", "Boing", "Bubbles", and others.

Each of these voices came with its own example text, that would be spoken when one hit the "Test" button in the Speech control panel. Some would just say their name, language and the version of MacinTalk they were introduced with. Others would say funny things, like "I sure like being inside this fancy computer", "I have a frog in my throat... No, I mean a real frog!", "We must rejoice in this morbid voice" (a parody of Western church hymnody with organ music), or "The light you see at the end of the tunnel is the headlamp of a fast approaching train". These voices are still in macOS today. (A few of the voice names and their test texts were changed with macOS Ventura, and then all their test texts were changed in macOS Sonoma to "Hello, my name is [voice name]." However, as of macOS Tahoe, the original funny test texts are once again spoken when previewing System voices.)

With the increase in computing power that the AV Macs and PowerPC based Macintoshes provided, Apple could afford to increase the quality of the synthesis. MacinTalk 3 required a 33 MHz 68030 processor and MacinTalk Pro required a 68040 or better and at least 1 MB of RAM. Each synthesizer supported a different set of voices.

==== Text-to-speech in Mac OS X ====
Text-to-speech has been a part of every Mac OS X (later macOS) version. The Victoria voice was enhanced significantly in Mac OS X v10.3, and added as Vicki (Victoria was not removed). Its size was almost 20 times greater, because of the higher-quality diphone samples used.

A new, much more natural-sounding voice, called "Alex" has been added to the Mac text-to-speech roster with the release of Mac OS X 10.5 Leopard.

With Mac OS X 10.7 Lion, voices are available in additional U.S. English and other English accents, as well as 21 other languages.

The Speak selected text when key is pressed feature allows selected text from any application to be read via a key combination. From Mac OS X 10.1 to Mac OS X 10.6, the feature would copy the selected text to the clipboard and read it from there. From Mac OS X 10.7 to Mac OS X 10.10, a new implementation of the feature required software developers to implement a speech synthesis API into their applications. This prevented the clipboard from being overwritten, but also meant that, for applications that did not use the API, the feature would not function as expected, reading the title bar rather than the selected text.

In macOS Sierra 10.12, Siri was introduced for the Mac, however, the voice was not available as a System Voice, which meant that the Siri voices could be only used in Siri. Siri was made available as a System voice in macOS Catalina 10.15, so that it would work for any text. The Siri voices work in a completely different way and the say command remains unable to use Siri.

In the macOS Big Sur 11.3 update, gender references to all voices were removed, coinciding with the change in Siri voices on iOS 14.5 and macOS 11.3 and later, as part of Apple's efforts to promote gender inclusivity.

=== Speech recognition ===
Apple hired many speech recognition researchers in 1990. After about a year, they demonstrated a technology codenamed Casper. It was released as part of the PlainTalk package in 1993. Although available for all PowerPC Macintoshes and AV 68k machines (it was one of the few applications that made use of the DSP in the Centris 660AV and Quadra 840AV), it was not part of the default system install prior to Mac OS X, requiring the user to perform a custom OS installation to get speech recognition capabilities.

In Mac OS X 10.7 Lion and earlier, Apple's speech recognition was voice-command oriented only, i.e. not intended for dictation. It can be configured to listen for commands when a hot key is pressed, after being addressed with an activation phrase such as "Computer", or "Macintosh", or without prompt. A graphical status monitor, often in the form of an animated character, provides visual and textual feedback about listening status, available commands and actions. It can also communicate back with the user using speech synthesis.

Early versions of the speech recognition provided full access to the menus. This support was later removed, since it required too many resources and made recognition less reliable, only to be re-added in Mac OS X 10.3 as a "universal access technology" called spoken user interface.

The user can launch items located in a special folder, called "Speakable Items", simply by speaking their name (while the system is in listening mode). Apple shipped a number of AppleScripts in this folder, but aliases, documents and folders can be opened in the same way.

Additional functionality is provided by individual applications. An application programming interface lets programs define and modify an available vocabulary. For example, the Finder provides a vocabulary for manipulating files and windows.

In OS X 10.8 Mountain Lion, Apple introduced "Dictation", intended for general text. Originally, it required the sending of audio data to Apple servers for processing. In OS X 10.9 Mavericks, Apple added the option to download support for dictation without an Internet connection. As of OS X 10.9.3, eight languages (19 dialects) are supported.

== Hardware ==
Apple produced two microphones under the product name "Apple PlainTalk Microphone". The first shipped inclusive with Macintosh LC and early Performa models, and was circular in appearance. It was designed to sit in a holder attached to the side of a CRT display, and be lifted out and held by the mouth when talking. The second model was introduced alongside the AV models in the Macintosh Quadra series in 1993 but was also sold separately. It was designed to be positioned on top of the screen and to be sensitive to sound from the front. Both models had a longer connector, the tip of which was used to provide the microphone with bias voltage.

== Cultural References ==
Original Macintalk was used to synthesize the voice for the primary antagonist of the 2008 Pixar film WALL-E.
