= List of We Bare Bears characters =

The American animated television series We Bare Bears features a cast created by Daniel Chong. The series focuses on Three Bears who try to navigate the human world and make friends. The Bears are the boisterous and adventurous Grizzly (voiced by Eric Edelstein), the kind, yet nervous Panda (voiced by Bobby Moynihan) and the quiet and mysterious Ice Bear (voiced by Demetri Martin). Despite their social ineptitude, they manage to meet a wide variety of characters, some of whom make recurring appearances on the show. Among these are the Korean American prodigy Chloe Park (voiced by Lo Mutuc (Note: Credited as Charlyne Yi)), the selfish and angry Nom Nom (voiced by Patton Oswalt), the socially inept Bigfoot Charlie (voiced by Jason Lee), the tough and determined Ranger Tabes (voiced by Cameron Esposito) accompanied with the adventurous and supportive Poppy Rangers; consisting of Diaz (voiced by Marissa Soto), Parker (voiced by Danity Harris), Murphy (voiced by Stella Balick-Karrer), Nguyen (voiced by Audrey Huynh), and Wallace (voiced by Cate Gragnani).

== Overview ==
Actor	Character	Seasons			
Actor	Character	1	2	3	4
Main
Eric Edelstein	Grizzly	Main	Main	Main	Main
Bobby Moynihan	Panda	Main	Main	Main	Main
Demetri Martin	Ice Bear	Main	Main	Main	Main
Secondary
Lo Mutuc	Chloe Park	Recurring	Starring	Starring	Starring
Patton Oswalt	Nom Nom	Recurring	Recurring	Recurring	Recurring
Jason Lee	Charlie	Recurring	Recurring	Starring	Starring
Cameron Esposito	Ranger Tabes		Recurring	Starring	Recurring
Ellie Kemper	Lucy	Guest		Recurring	Recurring
Cate Gragnani	Wallace			Recurring	Recurring
Audrey Huynh	Nguyen			Recurring	Recurring
Stella Balick-Karrer	Murphy			Recurring	Recurring
Danity Harris	Parker			Recurring	Recurring
Marissa Soto	Diaz			Recurring	Recurring

== Main ==
=== Grizzly ===
Grizzly
- We Bare Bears character
- First appearance: "The Three Bare Bears" (2009)
- Last appearance: We Bare Bears: The Movie (2020)
- Created by: Daniel Chong
- Voiced by: Eric Edelstein; Sam Lavagnino (young)

In-universe information
- Nickname: Grizz
- Species: North American brown bear
- Gender: Male

I am the bringer of justice, little bro!

— Grizzly to Panda, Bear Cleanse

Grizzly (nickname "Grizz") is a grizzly bear. The oldest and the de facto leader of the Bears, Grizzly is a fun-loving bear who tends to get the others into wacky and uncharacteristic situations. Grizzly is paradoxically highly sociable yet socially inept. Despite this, he is constantly wanting to meet new people and tries to befriend everyone he comes across. As a baby, he was rescued by a team of firemen who prevented him from falling off a tree-top during a storm (as such, he has a phobia of being in trees, which he states in "Paperboyz"). Afterward, he was adopted by a studio and starred in a Canadian sitcom called Family Troubles of which he was the star and known for his catchphrase "That's not what I ordered!" The show added a new character named Cousin Lorenzo whom Grizzly immediately disliked. After winning in a race against him, Grizzly suddenly realized that his fake family never offered true happiness or love and decided to leave the show to search for a family of his own, turning down fame and fortune in the process. It seems that he was younger than in most baby bear episodes in the flashback pictures in "Burrito." It was mentioned by Ice Bear that Grizzly writes poems in English, as well as being a DJ and a beatboxer. He also created a series of cheesy homemade action movies with himself starring as Crowbar Jones. Despite Grizzly's desire to be loved by everyone, he still puts his brothers first and foremost and can't bear to be separated from them. He has a strange love-hate relationship with Nom Nom, whom he looks up to due to his popularity, yet acknowledges that he can be mean and sometimes untrustworthy. He is also notable for having a strong relationship with Ranger Tabes (more so than Panda and Ice Bear), who typically calls on him to assist her with the girl-scout team, the Poppy Rangers, most likely due to the fact that since he is a grizzly bear and in theory, it makes sense that he would know a lot about nature, though it has been shown that this is not the case. In the episode, "Bunnies," Grizzly is shown to be capable of speaking to other animals as most of them, who display self-awareness and occasional human behavior, aren't able to speak English.

=== Panda ===
Panda
- We Bare Bears character
- First appearance: "The Three Bare Bears" (2009)
- Last appearance: We Bare Bears: The Movie (2020)
- Created by: Daniel Chong
- Voiced by: Bobby Moynihan; Duncan Joiner (young); Max Mitchell (young) (Note: Joiner and Mitchell interchange voices.)

In-universe information
- Nickname: Pan Pan
- Species: Giant panda
- Gender: Male

Justice delivered!

— Panda, Everyday Bears

Panda is a giant panda. He is the middle brother and is nicknamed Pan-Pan by Grizzly. He is tender-hearted and easily becomes anxious or embarrassed, but rude. It is revealed in "Panda 2" that Panda once lived in a controlled panda enclosure near a fictionalized version of Shanghai, China. A stuffed panda plush doll was dropped into his enclosure by one of the staff who noticed his loneliness and Panda befriended it by giving it a personality, which is primarily Panda voicing his deeper inner thoughts through the doll. Panda used the doll as a method of convincing himself to look through a window on the wall of the observatory, something he has always been curious about but never attempted to actually see. After using the doll to prop himself up, he finds a television set and becomes entranced by the moving pictures, and Anime, which is most likely how Panda came to appreciate it later in his life. In an effort to show his "friend" the Television, Panda escapes the Habitat through a food chute but after being discovered he jumps out the window of the laboratory and hides in a bamboo delivery truck, which brings him into downtown Shanghai. Panda has a lot less self-confidence than his brothers. He is good with technology and uses that skill on online social media and dating sites, with which he finds little to no success. He is also the one who "falls in love" the most quickly. Often several times to court several human girls, most notably Lucy the produce girl who has platonic feelings for him. Panda also owns a security pillow in the form of Miki-chan, a pillow with a picture of an anime schoolgirl (or dakimakura) on it who he pretends to be his actual girlfriend. The pillow is part of Grizzly's giant pillow cave in "Hibernation". He is the most creative of the brothers, having written songs in "Everyone's Tube", and undoubtedly the "cutest" as settled in "Panda's Sneeze". Panda is an ovo-vegetarian and has severe allergies to peanuts and cats. It has been revealed that Panda likes Anime and enjoys other things related to Japanese culture. He can be seen eating Ramen in multiple episodes with his brothers, and in "Hibernation" he is seen eating a snack similar to Pocky. Panda also attends community college where he takes up a course in painting as revealed in "Panda's Art".

=== Ice Bear ===
Ice Bear
- We Bare Bears character
- First appearance: "The Three Bare Bears" (2009)
- Last appearance: We Bare Bears: The Movie (2020)
- Created by: Daniel Chong
- Voiced by: Demetri Martin; Max Mitchell (young)

In-universe information
- Nicknames: Ice; Little Bro
- Species: Polar bear
- Gender: Male

Hashtag Ice Bear for president.

— Ice Bear, Viral Video

Ice Bear is a polar bear. He is the youngest of the Bears. Ice Bear is often rather stoic and rarely speaks. When he does, he speaks in a monotone voice and mostly in the third person and says his name first instead of "I", "Me", or "My" as shown in "The Audition". It is revealed in "Yuri and the Bear" that Ice Bear was raised by a Russian man named Yuri after his mother was suggested to have been killed by poachers. This is how he learned Russian, and because Yuri spoke exclusively in the third person, this is most likely how Ice Bear obtained the habit. He earned accommodation by doing chores, and Yuri taught him how to use the axe, cook, fix machinery, knit, play Uno with standard cards, as Ice ends up teaching Yuri calculus. He was cut adrift into the ocean when Yuri had to let him go to save him from the poachers, and the ice floated away from the mainland. He is multilingual, having been shown to speak Korean, French, Japanese (on "Losing Ice") and Russian fluently. Ice Bear also is able to speak to pigeons in the episode "Our Stuff." He is also a skilled chef, dancer, piano player, roboticist and engineer, charade player (on "My Clique"; it was revealed on "The Island" that he learned to speak very late, and originally used his charades skills to communicate), poet (which he writes in French), ice skater and a mixed martial artist (cited as Brazilian jiu-jitsu on "Chloe", but his skill set is closer to Taekwondo and judo with skills in Nunchaku, Shuriken and swords and ninja stars). In "I Am Ice Bear", he suffers a head injury and is able to speak properly. Ice Bear is the most composed of the brothers, always maintaining an "ice-cool attitude" in even the most awkward and embarrassing of situations. As seen in "Losing Ice" and "Coffee Cave", his brothers often take him for granted and are unappreciative of all the cooking and cleaning he does, although they eventually realize the error of their ways. Ice Bear sleeps in the refrigerator with a fire axe which he can use with either hand. Of the Three Bears, he has the closest relationship with Chloe, almost acting as a quiet big brother to her.

According to the episode "Road Trip", Ice Bear's height is 6'2" (1.88 m).

== Recurring ==
=== Chloe Park ===
Chloe Park
- We Bare Bears character
- First appearance: "Chloe" (2015)
- Last appearance: We Bare Bears: The Movie (2020)
- Created by: Madeline Sharafian
- Voiced by: Lo Mutuc (Note: Credited as Charlyne Yi)

In-universe information
- Species: Human
- Gender: Female

I skipped a couple of grades, so the joke's on you!

— Chloe Park, Chloe

Chloe Park is an 10-year-old girl of Korean descent who first met and befriended the Bears while attempting to study them. A child prodigy, she attends college but doesn't have many friends other than the bears and has a hard time relating to her much older classmates. In "My Clique," Chloe finally makes some friends with her college classmates, albeit with the help of the Bears. In the same episode, she is revealed to be bilingual. Chloe devotes most of her time to studying in the hopes of having a secure future and becomes stressed when it seems like she is on the verge of failing as evidenced in "The Library" and "Professor Lampwick". Despite fully knowing that the bears mean well, their antics sometimes stress her too. At one point she was nearly driven insane by the Bears when they got sick in the episode "Bear Flu" due to them asking for things. Nevertheless, she adores them and will often rely on them for help. She has shown to be involved in their misadventures such as in "The Demon" and "Road Trip". She also has an interesting connection with Ice Bear due to his quiet persona meshed with her more open personality as seen in "Chloe and Ice Bear". Of the Three Bears, she is most often seen with him.

=== Nom Nom ===
Nom Nom
- We Bare Bears character
- First appearance: "Viral Video" (2015)
- Last appearance: We Bare Bears: The Movie (2020)
- Created by: Madeline Sharafian
- Voiced by: Patton Oswalt

In-universe information
- Species: Koala
- Gender: Male

Hanging out in person is a thing of the past, buddy. Get with it! Also, friends are usually too loud or have schmutz all over their faces. I have servants, really yummy food, the internet... I think you can agree; I don't need anything else.

— Nom Nom, Viral Video

Nom Nom is a misanthropic, self-centered koala and the main antagonist during the first two seasons, starting a slow redemption from the third season onward. He is a famous internet star, known for his cute videos. While he doesn't talk in any of his videos, Nom Nom often yells angrily towards everyone he comes in contact with, especially the Bears. Grizzly imposes him enough to talk to him and admits that he liked his video, but Nom Nom is very self-centered, more concerned with materialistic things, and lashes out at anyone who he doesn't like (one example being in "The Nom Nom Show" where he was unwilling to share the spotlight with the Bears, despite the positive reception they received). In "Viral Video", Nom Nom says that he does not want any friends because he finds them unimportant and too loud, and proves his point by kicking Grizzly out of his limo. His temper is so short, he lashes out at anyone who even slightly annoys him.

He has shown a more tolerant side. In "Anger Management", it's revealed that Grizzly's hugs genuinely calm him to the point of making him optimistic and friendly. In "Nom Nom's Entourage", he saves a picture of his time with the Bears and in "Kyle", opened his home to another koala who claimed to be his brother. In "Vacation", he finally admits that Grizzly is the closest thing to a friend he has. In "Crowbar Jones: Origins", though he still finds him a nuisance, Nom Nom is shown to be more tolerant of Grizzly.

=== Charlie ===
Charlie
- We Bare Bears character
- First appearance: "Charlie" (2015)
- Last appearance: We Bare Bears: The Movie (2020)
- Created by: Madeline Sharafian; Tom Law
- Voiced by: Jason Lee

In-universe information
- Species: Bigfoot
- Gender: Male

Ah, you guys are excellent hosts. I already feel like at home..!

— Charlie, Charlie

Charlie is a friendly yet misanthropic Bigfoot who wanders alone around the San Francisco woods until he meets the Bears in "Charlie," where they agree to let him live in their cave for a little while via a website called CaveShare. He is tall and has multiple joints across his body. While it is unknown how old he is, he is apparently more than a century old as he is shown living as far back as 1913 as seen in "El Oso". It is revealed that, due to his life of solitude, he is socially inept and doesn't know how to be a good friend. This results in him unintentionally causing havoc for the Bears whenever he hangs out with them. He is also constantly harassed by humans trying to get pictures of him, which results in him becoming afraid of them and of cameras. He has on more than one occasion befriended someone other than the Bears. In "El Oso", he made friends with the titular character and in "Rescue Ranger", and saves Ranger Tabes anonymously (he eventually lets her get to know him in "Tabes & Charlie" after getting her name wrong numerous times (Tubes, Tebs, etc.)). In "Hurricane Hal", his actual home is shown to be a broken-down car while in "Christmas Parties" he hosts a party in a giant tree he decorates to be a Christmas tree. In the episode "Charlie Ball," we see that Charlie is extremely skilled at ball-handling and that his height makes him perfect for basketball. In "Charlie's Big Foot," Charlie is revealed to have blue-colored blood, and in "Bubble", it is revealed that his natural fur is actually gold colored making him look handsome and majestic. He also sees Panda as his best friend and usually tries to show off new discoveries and his "decor" to him over the other two. Besides Panda, he also is friends with a common snake as seen in "Charlie & The Snake".

=== Ranger Tabes ===
Ranger Tabes
- We Bare Bears character
- First appearance: "Ranger Tabes" (2016)
- Last appearance: We Bare Bears: The Movie (2020)
- Created by: Madeline Sharafian; Kyler Spears
- Voiced by: Cameron Esposito

In-universe information
- Full name: Dana Tabes
- Species: Human
- Gender: Female

I don't think wanting to do something right is blowing things out of proportion. These bears got something taken away from them and I want to help them because I care.

— Ranger Dana Tabes, Ranger Tabes

Ranger Dana Tabes is a park ranger. She lives in a trailer-style mobile home located in the park where the Bears live. They first meet her in "Ranger Tabes" where she helps them locate a missing package. She is shown to be overly confident, persistent and even downright obsessive with wanting to help people. Her obsession is explored in "Creature Mysteries" where she tries to capture and prove Charlie's existence. In that same episode, it's revealed that her mother was also a park ranger and the one who inspired her to become one. Her obsession is also prominent in "Poppy Rangers" where she was willing to lead a team of girl scouts, called the Poppy Rangers, into the dangerous Howling Mountain Cave, against Grizzly's urging and despite the Poppies' efforts to get Tabes to reconsider. Despite her quirky personality, the Bears consider her one of their closest friends and are shown to be dependent on her as seen in "Ranger Norm". Out of the Three Bears, Tabes seems to be with Grizzly the most and usually has him around as an assistant to help in leading the Poppy Rangers. Based on how much she relies on him, they seem to have mutual respect for each for other. In "Ranger Games", it is revealed that she has a rival in the form of Ranger Zhao (voiced by Ming-Na Wen) who leads her own group of girl scouts, called the Ivy Rangers. In "Bear Squad," Tabes is shown to possess deduction skills to the level of identifying animals and people by a limited amount of evidence. In the same episode, it is revealed that she is banned from doing any ranger work in the city. Over time, Tabes is shown to have calmed down a bit, though she still takes her job very seriously. She has even learned to be more surveillant with her duties and upon knowledge of Charlie's true existence has opted to watch and protect him from afar. By the end of "Rescue Ranger," she mildly becomes friends with Charlie and, like the Bears, decides to keep him a secret. Eventually, the two become good friends after he helps her finds her dog Kirk in "Tabes & Charlie."

=== Lucy ===
Lucy
- We Bare Bears character
- First appearance: "Panda's Date" (2015)
- Last appearance: We Bare Bears: The Movie (2020)
- Created by: Madeline Sharafian; Tom Law; Teresa Hsiao
- Voiced by: Ellie Kemper

In-universe information
- Species: Human
- Gender: Female

How are my favorite customers today?

— Lucy, Lucy's Brother

Lucy is a friend to the Bears and runs a produce delivery service called Lucy's Produce. She first appears in "Panda's Date" where she saves Panda's life when he has an allergic reaction to peanut cookies, afterwards she takes an immediate liking to the Bears and their goofy personalities. Panda quickly (as usual) develops a crush on her, but she seems to be unaware of his feelings. She finally returns in season 3 episode, "Lucy's Brother" where it is revealed that she delivers fruit to the Bears every Friday. In that same episode, she is shown to have a younger brother, named Clifford (voiced by Hudson West), whom she cares for and worries over immensely. She is also shown to be a terrible dancer, something which Panda was nervous telling her about. Despite being oblivious to Panda's feelings for her, the two share a mutual friendship. In "The Limo," Lucy begins dating Kale (voiced by Omid Abtahi) which upsets Panda, but he ultimately sees that her happiness is what matters.

=== Poppy Rangers ===
Poppy Rangers have no fear, kind to every bird and deer!

— Poppy Rangers' song, Poppy Rangers

The Poppy Rangers are the team of brave and adventurous, yet mischievous and happy-go-lucky young girl scouts that Ranger Tabes, and to a certain extent, Grizzly, lead in a variety of tasks and activities. Their ranks include Diaz (voiced by Marissa Soto), a "curious and witty" girl who aspires to be a biologist; Parker (voiced by Danity Harris), a "quiet and confident" girl who aspires to be an aeronautical engineer; Murphy (voiced by Stella Balick-Karrer), a "cheerful and patient" girl who aspires to be a geologist; Nguyen (voiced by Audrey Huynh), another "quiet and confident" girl who aspires to be a principal dancer, and Wallace (voiced by Cate Gragnani), an eye-patch wearing "fearless and born leader" who aspires to be a park ranger, like Tabes. The five girls are childhood friends, having been together ever since their first interaction with each other during their earlier childhood, similar to the three bears, before being officialized as the Poppy Rangers. The girls unanimously trust Tabes' leadership and advice, but also adore the three bears, more especially Grizzly, whom they affectionately call "Bear Guy," even though they are well aware of his flaws, such as in "Lord of the Poppies," and even admit that he is terrible in leadership, as seen in "Ranger Games." In the former episode, their arch-rivals and villainous counterparts, the Ivy Rangers, as well as Wallace's younger sister, Chuck Wallace, are introduced to the show.

==== Diaz ====
Diaz
- We Bare Bears character
- First appearance: "Poppy Rangers" (2017)
- Last appearance: We Bare Bears: The Movie (2020)
- Created by: Madeline Sharafian
- Voiced by: Marissa Soto

In-universe information
- Full name: Diaz
- Aliases: "Curious and witty"
- Species: Human
- Gender: Female

You'll get it next time!

— Diaz reassuring Grizzly, Ranger Games

Diaz is a "curious and witty" Southeast Asian girl scout of Latina descent who is very amusing, outgoing, rational, intelligent, passionate in learning, and aspires to be a biologist. Being deeply curious as mentioned before, Diaz is also prone to asking too much questions, as when Grizzly analyses the bats in the Howling Mountain Cave, Diaz asks that if the bats are from Central and South America in the episode, "Poppy Rangers." However, Diaz being the smartest of the Poppies does not mean that she is not even slightly naïve, as she reluctantly ate the poisonous berries from Grizzly (even though she was aware that the berries were not supposed to be eaten in the first place), causing Diaz to suffer brief nausea and end up vomiting upon the aftermath of eating those berries. Additionally, Diaz also likes seeking for a level of entertainment and fun, as she passionately has a pillow fight with her fellow Poppy Ranger, Murphy, to pass time and have fun during the Hurricane Hal. She is a member of the girl-scout Poppy Rangers. Diaz unanimously trusts Tabes' leadership and advice, but also adores the three bears, more especially Grizzly, whom she affectionately calls "Bear Guy" or "Mr. Bear Guy," even though she is well aware of his flaws, such as in "Lord of the Poppies," and even admit that he is terrible in leadership, as seen in "Ranger Games." Nonetheless, Diaz still shows high loyalty towards Grizzly and wants to be his dearest friend no matter what, like the other Poppies, having the courage to tell Grizzly that he will succeed in the end, no matter how much he fails.

==== Parker ====
Parker
- We Bare Bears character
- First appearance: "Poppy Rangers" (2017)
- Last appearance: We Bare Bears: The Movie (2020)
- Created by: Madeline Sharafian
- Voiced by: Danity Harris

In-universe information
- Full name: Parker
- Aliases: "Quiet and confident"
- Species: Human
- Gender: Female

You can do it, bear guy!

— Parker to Grizzly, Ranger Games

Parker is a "quiet and confident" African girl scout who is benevolent, paragonic and quite paranoid, having fear of the Howling Mountain Cave and cave salamanders, and aspires to be an aeronautical engineer. She is a member of the girl-scout Poppy Rangers. Parker unanimously trusts Tabes' leadership and advice, but also adores the three bears, more especially Grizzly, whom she affectionately calls "Bear Guy," even though she is well aware of his flaws, such as in "Lord of the Poppies," and even admit that he is terrible in leadership, as seen in "Ranger Games." Nonetheless, Parker still shows high loyalty towards Grizzly and wants to be his most welcoming friend no matter what, like the other Poppies, having the courage to tell Grizzly that he will succeed in the end (like Diaz), no matter how much he fails. Additionally, when Nguyen starts having a mental breakdown from too much starvation and despair by Grizzly continuing to unintentionally fail his and the Poppies' mission to hunt for food, and when Grizzly accidentally foils the Poppies' winning streak in the Peewee Ranger Games, Parker reassures Nguyen that it is "going to be okay," and tells Grizzly that he will succeed in the end (despite his failure), respectively. Along with this, when Ranger Tabes gets insecure by calling herself a "terrible leader" upon the aftermath of getting stranded in the Howling Mountain Cave, Grizzly and the Poppies reassure her, with Parker telling Tabes that she is the "coolest" in a fit of kindness, which further shows how faithful Parker is to the Poppies, Ranger Tabes and Grizzly.

==== Murphy ====
Murphy
- We Bare Bears character
- First appearance: "Poppy Rangers" (2017)
- Last appearance: We Bare Bears: The Movie (2020)
- Created by: Madeline Sharafian
- Voiced by: Stella Balick-Karrer

In-universe information
- Full name: Murphy
- Aliases: "Cheerful and patient"
- Species: Human
- Gender: Female

From now on, we'll root for you no matter what!

— Murphy to Grizzly, Ranger Games

Murphy is a "cheerful and patient" South Asian girl scout of Caucasian descent who is enthusiastic, fun-loving, somewhat naïve, typically aware of potential danger and has a pure heart, showing the least amount of grudge against Grizzly's incompetence out of the Poppies, and aspires to be a geologist. She is a member of the girl-scout Poppy Rangers. Murphy unanimously trusts Tabes' leadership and advice, but also adores the three bears, more especially Grizzly, whom she affectionately calls "Bear Guy," even though she is well aware of his flaws, such as in "Lord of the Poppies," and even admit that he is terrible in leadership, as seen in "Ranger Games." Additionally, when she and the Poppies fall into insanity from too much starvation in "Lord of the Poppies," Murphy seems to have symptoms of pica, shown when she eats a tree branch and a wooden log, both of which are virtually inedible for humans. Nonetheless, Murphy still shows high loyalty towards Grizzly and wants to be his most welcoming friend no matter what, like the other Poppies, having the courage to tell Grizzly that she and the Poppies will "root for her no matter what" in a show of pure kindness. As mentioned before, Murphy seems to show the least amount of displeasure against Grizzly's incompetence among the rest of the Poppies, with her most notable moment of doing so being where she dismisses Grizzly due to his lack of skill in kickball to win the Peewee Ranger Games against the Ivy Rangers, stating that she and the Poppies "might have had a chance without Bear Guy," which she is immediately remorseful of afterwards.

==== Nguyen ====
Nguyen
- We Bare Bears character
- First appearance: "Poppy Rangers" (2017)
- Last appearance: We Bare Bears: The Movie (2020)
- Created by: Madeline Sharafian
- Voiced by: Audrey Huynh

In-universe information
- Full name: Nguyen
- Aliases: "Quiet and confident"
- Species: Human
- Gender: Female

We are not ready and we are not gonna lose... maybe.

— Nguyen, Ranger Games

Nguyen is a Vietnamese girl scout of Chinese descent who is another case of being "quiet and confident," alongside Parker. She is an experienced, kindhearted, somewhat paranoid and wise amazon that comes second in command of the Poppies, and aspires to be a principal dancer. She is a member of the girl-scout Poppy Rangers. Nguyen unanimously trusts Tabes' leadership and advice, but also adores the three bears, more especially Grizzly, whom she affectionately calls "Bear Guy," even though she is well aware of his flaws, such as in "Lord of the Poppies," and even admit that he is terrible in leadership, as seen in "Ranger Games." Additionally, Nguyen shows the least patience with Grizzly's incompetence, outright lashing out at him for unintentionally messing up in hunting for food in "Lord of the Poppies." Nonetheless, Nguyen still shows high loyalty towards Grizzly and wants to be his dearest friend no matter what, like the other Poppies. Furthermore, Nguyen cares for the safety of the Poppies, Grizzly and Ranger Tabes, shown when she is reluctant on exploring the Howling Mountain Cave for the badges and reasons with Tabes out of it, and apprises Grizzly that Wallace is flying her kite outside in the Hurricane Hal, prompting her, Grizzly and the Poppies to save her from the hurricane.

==== Wallace ====
Wallace
- We Bare Bears character
- First appearance: "Poppy Rangers" (2017)
- Last appearance: We Bare Bears: The Movie (2020)
- Created by: Madeline Sharafian
- Voiced by: Cate Gragnani

In-universe information
- Full name: Wallace
- Aliases: "Fearless and born leader" Eye-patch kid
- Species: Human
- Gender: Female

We're the Poppy Rangers and we're here to say... we're so glad that bears can play!

— Wallace, Ranger Games

Wallace is an eye-patch wearing "fearless and born leader" who is an American tomboyish girl of Caucasian descent that is strong-willed, adventurous, determined, selfless, benevolent, yet somewhat misguided, evident by her flying her "Mighty Eagle" kite in the Hurricane Hal without signs of awareness and apprehension (until her kite got blown away, as well as Wallace herself almost until she was saved by Grizzly and the Poppies from the hurricane), and aspires to be a park ranger, like Ranger Tabes. It is unknown whether Wallace has only injured her eye or lost it, but she (and her parents) seems to shrug it off, only stating that she has "no regrets" and that "it was worth it" for the badge relative to it. Wallace serves as the leader of the Poppy Rangers, but her maturity is quite mediocre for being such a dedicated model leader. Wallace unanimously trusts Tabes' leadership and advice, but also adores the three bears, more especially Grizzly, whom she affectionately calls "Bear Guy," even though she is well aware of his flaws, such as in "Lord of the Poppies," and even admit that he is terrible in leadership, as seen in "Ranger Games." In the latter episode, Wallace's younger sister, Chuck Wallace, is introduced. Additionally, Wallace is the most aware of Grizzly's incompetence, revising the flashbacks of how Grizzly unintentionally caused bonfires while working to attain the other Poppy Badges through unknown means (even setting his own swimming suit on fire underwater), repeatedly saying that "he didn't do it." Nonetheless, Wallace still shows high loyalty towards Grizzly and wants to be his dearest friend no matter what, like the other Poppies. Of the five Poppies, Wallace seems to be the closest one to Grizzly and Tabes in terms of relationship.

== Minor ==
=== Pigeon Cartel ===
Panda's cell phone

The Pigeon Cartel is composed of pigeons who are actually an underground illegal trading ring. They are the closest thing to arch-enemies the Bears have and first appeared in "Our Stuff". They stole the Bears' items, which included Grizzly's wallet, Panda's cell phone and Ice Bear's ninja stars, along with a wide variety of other expensive and important items around the city. The Bears unintentionally landed in their hideout where the cartel or at least a subgroup of them were arrested. In "Pigeons", they are revealed to have a member in their ranks named Brenda whom Grizzly ends up befriending. Brenda actually tricks Grizzly into helping her free her gang from prison, or rather the pigeon coup inside the prison, she ultimately has a change of heart due to Grizzly's kindness.

=== Chloe's Family ===
- Richard Park (voiced by Jinkoo Jeong) is Chloe's father. He was initially reserved about Chloe hanging out with the Bears, but warms up to their presence in "Slumber Party". He is bilingual.
- Winifred Park (voiced by Niki Yang) is Chloe's mother. She is very supportive of Chloe's friendship with the Bears as evidenced when she makes sandwiches for them in "Chloe and Ice Bear". She is bilingual.
- Jon Park (voiced by Bert Youn) is Chloe's cousin. He appeared in "Christmas Parties" where is shown to be rather cocky and doesn't get along with Chloe very well. He has a habit of pranking her every chance he gets and always gets away with it.

=== Farmer ===
Farmer (voiced by Kyler Spears) is Nom Nom's personal bodyguard. He was initially known as Bodyguard #1 due to his primary task of protecting Nom Nom who in turn didn't think much of him. However, this all changed in the episode "Kyle" where it is shown that Farmer genuinely cares for Nom Nom's security when he suspected that the titular koala was trying to scam Nom Nom. After rescuing his employer, Nom Nom became more aware of him and asked for his real name, calling him Farmer from that point on.

=== Rangers ===
- Kirk O’Brian (voiced by Christopher McGurrin) is a dog that Tabes was given as a Christmas present by the Bears in "Christmas Parties." In "Lunch with Tabes," he is shown to be rather clever and mischievous. In "Tabes & Charlie," he is revealed to have fathered three pups with a wolf.
- Ranger Martinez (voiced by Keith Ferguson) is Tabes' partner. He has been a park ranger since Tabes was a child and was initially her mother's partner. In his old age, he is always prone to sleep and is shown to be rather laid-back. He is also very friendly with the Bears.
- Ranger Zhao (voiced by Ming-Na Wen) is Tabes' arch-rival. She is an egotistical and unsportsmanlike park ranger who holds no value for anyone and even other park rangers other than herself and her fellow team of girl scouts, the Ivy Rangers, even showing quite an xenophobic attitude toward Grizzly in "Ranger Games" by mockingly laughing at him for being Tabes and the Poppy Rangers' "secret weapon," and declining Grizzly being a player of the Peewee Ranger Games due to being a bear, regardless if he is a ranger. She is also very prone to anger and intolerant to failure, shown by her saying that he is "looking forward to her team's fourth consecutive victory" and when she furiously vows to win against Tabes and the Poppies next year after losing to them for the first time in the Peewee Ranger Games, and what makes this even more clear is that Zhao will push anyone in her way, even if unnecessary, like Martinez.
- The Ivy Rangers (voiced by unknown voice actresses) are the arch-rivals of the Poppy Rangers. These girl scouts are spoiled and narcissistic, yet intimidating and oppressive juvenile delinquents, in contrast to the Poppy Rangers. The six girls have been the bullies of the Poppy Rangers ever since their first interaction with them during their earlier childhood, and the girls were even bullies to everyone around them before being officialized as the Ivy Rangers. The girls unanimously trust Zhao's leadership and are very loyal to each other, similar to the Poppy Rangers' loyalty to each other. The girls are infamous for their dominance over the Peewee Ranger Games, and they are very intolerant to failure and prone to anger, and will harm anyone that gets in their way, such as when one of the Ivy Rangers tackled Wallace without remorse in "Ranger Games," and the girls are mastered in trickery, shown when one of the Ivy Rangers distracted Grizzly by saying that they thought "bears were too busy licking honey to play kickball" in the same episode.

=== Clifford ===
Clifford (voiced by Hudson West) is Lucy's younger brother. He has many allergies and has trouble socializing with others. He constantly wanders off and is very shy. He starts to like Panda once he is considered a friend. He is also very defensive of his sister, seen as he is aware that many boys use him as an attempt to get close to her and gets mad at Panda for doing so. Fortunately, he and Panda reconcile and consider each other close friends.

=== Darrell ===
Darrell Saragosa (voiced by Mel Rodriguez) a 35-year-old man, is a friend to the Bears and owns a mousepad store called Super Rad Mousepads. He first appears in "Losing Ice" where he answers a want ad from Grizzly and Panda asking for a replacement for the missing Ice Bear. He happily takes the job, despite the harsh conditions, and later makes them realize their error in taking Ice Bear for granted. He lives with his grandma, Emma, who apparently does most of his cooking. He returns in "Bear Lift" where the Bears help his fledgling business, a mousepad dealer. It's also shown that in his youth his store was once booming and brought people together, but over time it began to wear away. By the end, the Bears help bring the store back due to its 'retro' appeal. In "Best Bears" Darrell marries Sofia (voiced by Brigitte Kali Canales), a hang gliding instructor and fashion designer who thinks that he and the Bears are cool.

=== Yana ===
Yana (voiced by Margarita Levieva) is a Russian woman with dark connections to Ice Bear. She is a strong woman with a sentimental side to her as well. She and Ice Bear have known each other for a long time and have been saving each other across the world in unexplained circumstances. Yana first appeared in "Icy Nights" where she briefly helped Ice Bear look for his Roomba. She returns in "Icy Nights II" where she is kidnapped by Barry, a tech genius who is after the Roomba. At the end of the episode, it's revealed that Yana's father is Yuri, the same man who raised Ice Bear. It's unknown whether Yuri is still in contact with her or knows that she's still alive.

=== Barry ===
Barry Charles (voiced by Kevin McHale) is a technical expert and Ice Bear's nemesis. He leads a gang of techies and is involved in illegal activities. His main goal is to steal Ice Bear's Roomba due to the technical specifications it possesses. The reason for doing this is so that he can earn the approval of his father (voiced by Keith David), something that is a sore spot for him. It's unknown what happened to him, it presumed he and his father were arrested off screen for their crime.

=== Marie ===
Marie (voiced by Edi Patterson) is a web show host that the Bears occasionally watch. She hosts the show Mornings with Marie off from the website Everyone's Tube. She tends to report on all the latest crazes and current things usually from the internet such as Nom Nom and Panda's sudden popularity like in "Panda's Sneeze". Marie also hosts the Cute-Off, a competition where two animals from viral videos participate.

=== The Bros ===
The Bros are the human doppelgangers to the Bears. They first appeared in "Panda's Friend". They fittingly display qualities similar to the actual Bears, and also achieve things that the Bears want.

- Tom (voiced by Bert Youn) is Panda's counterpart. He is a small, presumably Asian, man, who wears glasses and typically wears a black hoodie with a white stripe going through it so as to resemble a panda. He, just like Panda, loves Korean dramas and anime and is apparently a 97% match to Panda according to an app. He becomes way too attached to Panda and kidnaps him from his home and moves him into his apartment. When he realizes how obsessive he has become, he leaves (or rather falls) and meets his two future roommates Griff and Isaac. He is much more stable with the two and in "Bro Brawl" implies that they are his only real family as well. In that same episode, he states that he has a girlfriend.
- Griff (voiced by Eric Edelstein in "Panda's Friend" and later by Faruq Tauheed) is Grizzly's counterpart. Griff is a "renegade" cop, later revealed to be a mall cop, who loves his job and is capable of helping people, as opposed to Grizzly who has no job and, while helpful, is socially awkward. He is a well-built African-American man who usually wears a blue shirt. He seems to care a lot about his roommates and in his first appearance was nervous about losing his home for not meeting the roommate quota until Tom literally dropped in. In "The Mall", he is shown to be very friendly with Grizzly.
- Isaac (voiced by Demetri Martin) is Ice Bear's counterpart. Isaac is a "five-star chef" who, much like Ice Bear, is tall and quiet. He wears a white hoodie with the hood always over his head and his blond bangs hanging out. When he speaks he follows Ice Bear's speech mannerisms by talking in the third person and in monotone. He sleeps in a walk-in closet, like how Ice Bear sleeps in a fridge and also seems to possess many outlandish abilities. In "Bro Brawl" he one ups Ice Bear in the cook-off when Ice mistakenly leaves a lock of hair in the dish he prepared. In "The Mall", he and Ice Bear seem to view each other as rivals, until at the end of the episode they have had to join forces to save Panda.

=== Captain Craboo ===
Captain Craboo is the Bears' pet crab whom they adopted in the episode "Emergency". He actually came from the supermarket which Grizzly went to buy food and immediately fell in love with the crab. Unfortunately, it pinches onto Ice Bear's ear causing him great pain. Grizzly and Panda eventually get Craboo off of Ice Bear and resort to giving him tiny mitts so that he doesn't pinch Ice Bear again. He returns in "Captain Craboo" where it is revealed that he has been gone for quite some time and that Ice Bear still has not forgiven him. However, the two later make up when the crab defends Ice and attacks Nom Nom, making Craboo a wanted fugitive. By the end of the episode, Craboo solemnly leaves the Bears when they release him into the ocean, with Ice Bear seeming to take his departure the hardest.

=== The Mailman ===
The Mailman (voiced by Keith Ferguson) is a friendly mailman that occasionally visits the Bears. He first appears in "Nom Nom" where he delivers a toy helicopter to the Bears. He falls into a pit where Ice Bear was trapped by Nom Nom. He shows that he doesn't mind the situation and also didn't seem to mind being left there. He returns in "Crowbar Jones" where he was invited to see the titular movie that Grizzly had made. He was easily impressed by it and based on his reactions, simply wishes to have friends. In "Citizen Tabes," he was also impressed with Tabes' packaging to the point that he was willing to listen to her ramble about how she did it. In "I, Butler", he was interested in playing basketball with the bears even though he creepily appeared from behind their bushes.

=== Mad Scientist ===
Mad Scientist (voiced by Jason Mantzoukas) is an unnamed scientist who is constantly plotting against the government. He first appears in "Grizz Helps" where Grizzly answers a want ad for someone to aid him in traveling back in time. He was going to use a chicken named Mark as a test subject and Grizzly had to rescue him for its owner. The scientist reappeared in "Summer Love" with a pelican assistant named Gary and tried to use a body swapping machine on Panda. He revealed that he once had a girlfriend named Amelia who joined the space program, implying one of the reasons he kept conspiring against the government.

=== Ralph ===
Ralph (voiced by John DiMaggio) is a yeti who enjoys playing cruel pranks on humans and animals. He first appears in the episode of the same name where Charlie befriends him due to being a creature just like him, despite the Bears gaining distrust of Ralph due to his mean nature. He ends up abandoning Charlie when the latter refuses to let a group of humans fall off a bridge as part of a prank, considering him a "snooze-fest". He appears again in "Ice Cave" where he takes over the Bears' cave and freezes its interior, ruling it like a king. He usually puts Charlie down due to his lanky body and pushover personality, but Charlie stands up to him and puts Ralph in his place.

=== Dr. Clark ===
Dr. Clark (voiced by Avery Kidd Waddell) is a medical nurse and Nom Nom's personal doctor. He first appeared in "Charlie's Big Foot" where he treated Charlie's foot after it broke. He is shown to have a very unusual bedside manner in that he has a very lethargic and slightly disinterested way of speaking. However, he is shown to take his job seriously and looked aghast at seeing Charlie's blood. He returned in "Vacation" where he acted as Nom Nom's personal doctor. His diagnosis was that he was stressed and prescribed that he take a vacation with Grizzly acting as his coach. Once again, Dr. Clark delivered all of this in a lethargic disinterested attitude. In "Braces", he is revealed to also serve as a dentist and possesses numerous doctoral degrees.

== Guests ==
=== Paul and Annie ===
Paul (voiced by Lou Ferrigno) and Annie (voiced by Grey Griffin) are a married couple that appeared in "Yard Sale". Annie is a woman who was first seen to be heavily pregnant. She sold a box of free things to the Bears at a yard sale she had set up. The things in question were large foam toy fists (which Grizzly begins wearing only for them to get stuck to his paws), her husband Paul's phone (which Panda mistakenly takes and begins sending texts unknowingly to Annie) and a pregnancy workout DVD (which Ice Bear begins watching and using to work out). Paul, who resembles a large well-built man, jumps to conclusions at Panda using his phone to message his wife and threatens him, but becomes nervous and faints when Annie goes into labor. The Bears band together to get Annie and Paul to the hospital where she successfully gives birth to a baby boy that somehow manages to remove the fake hands off of Grizzly.

=== Professor Lampwick ===
Professor Lampwick (voiced by Malcolm McDowell) is Chloe's science professor at the university and he is introduced in his self-titled episode. Lampwick is a tall, lean older man with a sinister and stern personality. He has a notorious reputation for being a difficult professor who refuses second chances with his students. Chloe gets so intimidated by him that she fails her course causing her much grief. However, the Bears decide to kidnap him and bring him back to the cave in an effort to force him to give Chloe a second chance. Lampwick proves to be crafty as he turns the Bears against one another, forcing Chloe to step up and demand a second chance, which he grants. When Chloe passes, Lampwick reveals that he can untie his own bonds and has just been testing her, admitting that she is not the first student to "kidnap [him] over a grade." He briefly returns in "Hurricane Hal" where he is shown to have an omniscient presence as the narrator, capable of explaining exactly what each of the Bears is doing and apparently is aware of who Charlie is.

=== Andy Bangs ===
Andrew "Andy" Bangs (voiced by Bo Burnham) is a child internet star and Nom Nom's main rival who appeared in "Nom Nom's Entourage". Andy's name is a pun on the fact that his videos consist mostly of him popping out of places and shouting "Bang!" and that he has dyed bangs. He takes great pleasure in humiliating and outsmarting Nom Nom using his trademark surprise gimmick. One thing he has over Nom Nom is the fact that he is constantly surrounded by his entourage, which Nom Nom lacks forcing him to hire the Bears. Nom eventually manages to get back at Andy by surprising him with his signature "Bang!".

=== Karla and Dave ===
Karla (voiced by Felicia Day) and Dave (voiced by Jake Johnson) are a pair of castaways that the Baby Bears encounter in "The Island". The Baby Bears are rescued from quicksand by Karla and Dave who have been shipwrecked on the island for some unspecified amount of time. All that is known is that they came separately. Karla mostly misses her sister whom she loves very much and forms a motherly bond with the Baby Bears, while Dave displays a slightly disinterested attitude. It eventually becomes clear that Dave has been misleading Karla and the Baby Bears and that he wants Karla to stay with him alone. The Baby Bears rescue Karla from Dave and escape on an inflatable raft they found, leaving Dave all alone. Karla is rescued by a passing ship, but the Baby Bears float on until they end up in Japan.

=== Yuri ===
Yuri (voiced by Darin De Paul) is an old Russian man who lived out in the arctic as a hermit survivalist, until he met Baby Ice Bear in the episode "Yuri and the Bear". A tall, large bearded man who much like Baby Ice Bear, had a tendency to speak in the third person, Yuri lived in a life of solitude after losing his family to some unknown causes. He took Baby Ice Bear under his wing and, after some initial reluctance to have him, taught him everything that he knew. They were confronted by a hunter, who is implied to have killed Baby Ice Bear's family, and Yuri is forced to cut Ice Bear away from land to save him. In "Icy Nights II", it is revealed that Yuri is Yana's father.

=== Wyatt ===
Wyatt (voiced by Ron Funches) is the overtly kind leader of a bike gang in "Road Trip". Wyatt is a random individual that Chloe and the Bears encounter while on their way to see a meteor shower. He displays a slightly lethargic, yet kind and joking attitude that gets him an invitation from Grizzly, Panda, and Chloe to hitch a ride with them as he claims to have lost his bike gang, much to Ice Bear's annoyance. Eventually, Ice Bear manages to drive off without him, only to have the car run out of gas. Wyatt shows up with his gang and they offer to get them gas. Later on, he joins Chloe and the Bears in watching the meteor shower.

=== Warren and Faye ===
Warren (voiced by Robert Clotworthy) and Faye (voiced by Frances Conroy) are a friendly elderly couple who live in a RV in the woods somewhere near where the Bears live. They appear in the episode "Neighbors" and are depicted as an overtly kind couple who immediately take joy in conversing with the Bears. While Panda and Ice Bear find them pleasant, Grizzly, having watched a docu-series on serial killers, finds them suspicious when he overhears them talking about him. That night, the Bears see them chopping down wood with Grizzly's photo on it, which seems to confirm Grizzly's worst fears and the Bears panic and plan to spy on the couple. They end up finding knives and other cutting instruments in the couple's RV, along with a wall full of pictures of the Bears. However, it is revealed that the two are woodcarving fanatics and simply want the Bears as models for their hobby. They forgive the Bears for their snooping after the Bears agree to their request. Warren and Faye are named after Warren Beatty and Faye Dunaway.

=== Esteller ===
Esteller or Estellar, as spelled in the credits, (voiced by Estelle) is a famous pop song singer who Panda and Tom are huge fans of. She appears in the episode "The Mall" where she arrives at the titular location to personally sign autographs for her fans, whom she affectionately refers to as her "starlings". Esteller is moved by Panda and Tom's willingness to let their limited-edition shirts be ruined to help others. She thanks them and gives them new signed shirts while politely berating the other fans who had cut in line and had chased Panda and Tom around by telling them, "Don't be jerks." Estelle sings the series' theme song and appears as herself in the episode "More Everyone's Tube," where she sings the full version of the song.

=== Charles Barkley ===
Charles Barkley appears as himself in the episode "Baby Bears Can't Jump". He is a famous basketball player that the Baby Bears admire when they find a basketball card about him.

=== T-Pain ===
Rapper T-Pain appears as himself in the episode "The Limo". It is revealed that he watches Grizzly's Crowbar Jones series. Panda is a fan of the rapper.

=== Monsta X ===
The K-pop group Monsta X appear as themselves appear in the episode "Panda's Birthday". The group comprises seven members: Shownu, Wonho, Minhyuk, Kihyun, Hyungwon, Jooheon, and I.M. Panda is a fan of the K-pop group, but Grizzly and Ice Bear are not, since they mixed up the group with another metal rock group called Monsta S.

=== Agent Trout ===
Agent Trout (voiced by Marc Evan Jackson) is the main antagonist of We Bare Bears: The Movie. He is a corrupt agent of the National Wildlife Control who is obsessed with "maintaining the natural order".
