= List of We Bare Bears episodes =

We Bare Bears is an American animated television series on Cartoon Network. Created by Daniel Chong and directed by Manny Hernandez, it follows the adventures of three adopted anthropomorphic bears, Grizzly, Panda, and Ice Bear (voiced respectively by Eric Edelstein, Bobby Moynihan, and Demetri Martin), as they navigate life among humans in San Francisco.

The first six episodes of the series were aired during the final week of July 2015, starting on July 27. The network renewed the series for a second season in August 2015. The first season ended on February 11, 2016, and the second season premiered on February 25, 2016. The series was renewed for a third season in October 2016 which premiered on April 3, 2017, and the second season ended a week later on April 11, 2017; the second and third-season episodes alternated between each other for the first two weeks of April. On March 8, 2018, the series was renewed for a fourth and final season, which premiered on July 30, 2018 and ended on May 27, 2019.

== Series overview ==
Season	Episodes		Originally released	
Season	Episodes		First released	Last released
Pilot			May 21, 2014	
Shorts	15	5	July 6, 2015	December 1, 2015
Shorts	15	5	June 30, 2016	
Shorts	15	5	April 27, 2017	
1	26		July 27, 2015	February 11, 2016
2	26		February 25, 2016	April 11, 2017
3	44		April 3, 2017	February 16, 2018
4	44		July 30, 2018	May 27, 2019
Film			June 30, 2020	

== Episodes ==
=== Pilot (2014) ===
A pilot for the series was produced by Cartoon Network Studios and was released in 2014 at the KLIK! Animation Festival in Amsterdam. Following its release, it received the festival's "Young Amsterdam Audience" award. The pilot was aired over a year later, on Cartoon Network's feed for the United Kingdom and Ireland.

Title	Directed by	Written and storyboarded by	Original release date (KLIK! Festival)	Original air date (UK and Ireland)	Prod. code
"We Bare Bears"	Phil Rynda (creative), Sue Mondt (art), and Robert Alvarez (timing)	Daniel Chong	May 21, 2014	August 26, 2015	000
Grizzly and Ice Bear help Panda after his Internet girlfriend breaks up with him by taking him out for ice cream, running into a child's birthday party along the way. Grizzly convinces his brothers to join the party, but the three have trouble fitting in.

=== Season 1 (2015–16) ===
No. overall	No. in season	Title	Written and storyboarded by	Story by	Original release date	Prod. code	U.S. viewers (millions)
1	1	"Our Stuff"	Daniel Chong	Daniel Chong	July 27, 2015	1033-003	2.05
After playing a poor game of basketball, the Bears discover that their backpack of things have been stolen. They venture through the city in search of their missing things, but everywhere they go, they seem to cause more trouble and nearly get arrested.
2	2	"Viral Video"	Madeline Sharafian	Daniel Chong and Madeline Sharafian	July 27, 2015	1033-002	2.05
Inspired by a viral video of Nom Nom (Patton Oswalt) the koala, the Bears, mostly Grizzly, attempt to become famous themselves by making their own video. They later attend a conference for potential memes and meet Nom Nom, who turns out to be an arrogant celebrity.
3	3	"Food Truck"	Abe Audish, Daniel Chong, and Bert Youn	Daniel Chong, Teresa Hsiao, and Madeline Sharafian	July 28, 2015	1033-009	1.88
The Bears establish a food truck after being disappointed by other vendors. However, their business goes awry when wild animals start purchasing from the Bears in bulk and scare away patrons of surrounding trucks.
4	4	"Chloe"	Madeline Sharafian	Daniel Chong and Madeline Sharafian	July 29, 2015	1033-004	2.11
Chloe (Lo Mutuc (Note: Credited as Charlyne Yi)), a child prodigy, observes the bears in their cave as part of research for a college presentation and ends up becoming close friends with them, but when she leaves her laptop at their cave and they see what they deem as unpolished, the Bears edit her slide show to their liking.
5	5	"Panda's Date"	Tom Law and Madeline Sharafian	Daniel Chong, Teresa Hsiao, and Madeline Sharafian	July 30, 2015	1033-005	1.87
After a saleswoman named Lucy (Ellie Kemper) rescues him from a peanut allergy attack in a farmer's market, Panda falls in love and tries to get closer to her. However, his brothers accidentally ruin Panda's chances with her.
6	6	"Everyday Bears"	Abe Audish and Bert Youn	Daniel Chong, Teresa Hsiao, Madeline Sharafian, and Bert Youn	July 31, 2015	1033-011	1.77
The Bears go on with their daily routines. However, something causes disruption for each of the Bears: Ice Bear fights with a Roomba, Panda tries to repel a mouse invading his room, and Grizzly gets stuck in a tree whilst retrieving a Frisbee from a group of teens.
7	7	"Burrito"	Manny Hernandez, Madeline Sharafian, and Bert Youn	Daniel Chong, Teresa Hsiao, and Madeline Sharafian	August 6, 2015	1033-006	1.65
After entering an eating competition, Grizzly becomes attached to a "bear-sized" burrito and takes it with him everywhere, eventually to the point of it becoming his life. Panda and Ice Bear try to cure Grizzly whose attachment seems to stem from his long forgotten past.
8	8	"Primal"	Manny Hernandez and Guillermo Martinez	Daniel Chong, Teresa Hsiao, Tom Law, and Madeline Sharafian	August 13, 2015	1033-010	1.78
After seeing an advert of the wilderness, Grizzly takes Panda and Ice Bear out into the woods and misleads them so that they get lost to test their survival skills.
9	9	"Jean Jacket"	Adam Campbell, Eric Favela, Manny Hernandez, and Madeline Sharafian	Mikey Heller	August 20, 2015	1033-008	1.59
Grizzly finds a denim jacket in a dumpster, and it immediately begins to bring good luck to the Bears. This soon causes them to fight over who gets to wear it, which begins to outweigh the luck.
10	10	"Nom Nom"	Manny Hernandez, Tom Law, and Madeline Sharafian	Daniel Chong and Suzie Vlček	August 27, 2015	1033-012	1.49
After having a televised fit of rage, Nom Nom loses his social status and begs the Bears for hospitality at their cave. He later asks them to help him regain his fame by starring in a film; Grizzly and Panda accept, but Ice Bear doubts about the plan.
11	11	"Shush Ninjas"	Tom Law and Guillermo Martinez	Daniel Chong, Monica Padrick, and Spencer Porter	September 3, 2015	1033-014	1.39
After a rowdy audience spoils a film they watch, the Bears become ninjas to quiet noisy people at the movie theater.
12	12	"My Clique"	Guillermo Martinez, Kyler Spears, and Bert Youn	Daniel Chong and Monica Padrick	September 10, 2015	1033-016	1.53
The Bears try to help Chloe socialize with her older college classmates, but nothing works. The bears throw a party for Chloe and her classmates at their cave, getting locked out in the process.
13	13	"Charlie"	Tom Law and Madeline Sharafian	Daniel Chong, Teresa Hsiao, Tom Law, and Madeline Sharafian	September 17, 2015	1033-007	1.43
After finding them online, a Bigfoot-like creature named Charlie (Jason Lee) stays at the Bears' cave and nearly destroys it, much to Panda's annoyance.
14	14	"Brother Up"	Manny Hernandez, Tom Law, Guillermo Martinez, Eddie Sassen, Madeline Sharafian, Kyler Spears, and Bert Youn	Daniel Chong, Manny Hernandez, Mikey Heller, and Spencer Porter	October 12, 2015	1033-020	1.22
Panda accidentally scares off a pack of wolves, disrupting the hierarchy of the Bears and dethroning Grizzly as leader.
15	15	"Occupy Bears" "Occupy Bare Bears"	Manny Hernandez, Tom Law, Eddie Sassen, and Bert Youn	Spencer Porter	October 13, 2015	1033-025	1.03
The Bears battle construction workers who want to demolish the cave. Later, they recall the time they moved into the cave and hunt for evidence to call off the demolition.
16	16	"Panda's Sneeze"	Guillermo Martinez, Madeline Sharafian, Kyler Spears, and Bert Youn	Mikey Heller and Spencer Porter	October 14, 2015	1033-019	1.22
A video of Panda's cute sneeze goes viral, eclipsing Nom Nom's popularity and sparking a battle of cuteness between the two.
17	17	"The Road"	Madeline Sharafian and Kyler Spears	Daniel Chong and Suzie Vlček	October 15, 2015	1033-013	1.59
The Baby Bears try to sell themselves out of a box on the side of a road. After a hitchhiker steals their box, they discover a warehouse full of more boxes and compete for who can build a better structure out of them, drifting them apart.
18	18	"Emergency"	Manny Hernandez, Guillermo Martinez, and Madeline Sharafian	Mikey Heller, Spencer Porter, and Louie Zong	October 16, 2015	1033-017	1.39
Grizzly and Panda must race Ice Bear to the hospital after Grizzly's new crab pinches his ear.
19	19	"Tote Life"	Manny Hernandez, Tom Law, Eddie Sassen, and Bert Youn	Mikey Heller and Spencer Porter	November 2, 2015	1033-021	1.51
The Bears join the "tote life" after seeing everyone use decorative reusable shopping bags at the market after a near-disgrace.
20	20	"Charlie & The Snake"	Madeline Sharafian and Kyler Spears	Mikey Heller and Spencer Porter	November 3, 2015	1033-001	1.66
Charlie befriends a forest snake while trying to find food for the Bears.
21	21	"Video Date"	Tom Law, Guillermo Martinez, and Bert Youn	Mikey Heller and Spencer Porter	November 4, 2015	1033-022	1.46
After Panda starts dating a French girl named Celine (Jaclyn Fleming) by video, his brothers agree to help him, but end up falling in love with her too.
22	22	"Pet Shop"	Vera Brosgol, Tom Law, Julian Narino, Eddie Sassen, and Kyler Spears	Daniel Chong, Mikey Heller, and Spencer Porter	November 5, 2015	1033-015	1.52
The Baby Bears try to get adopted at a pet shop by attempting to star in a commercial.
23	23	"Chloe and Ice Bear"	Eddie Sassen and Madeline Sharafian	Danny Ducker, Mikey Heller, Spencer Porter, and Lo Mutuc	November 6, 2015	1033-023	1.56
Chloe and Ice Bear explore the city together while Grizzly and Panda are playing video games, but Chloe has a hard time finding something that Ice Bear enjoys.
24	24	"Cupcake Job" "Cupcake Shop"	Danny Ducker, Manny Hernandez, Guillermo Martinez, Eddie Sassen, Bert Youn, and Louie Zong	Mikey Heller and Spencer Porter	November 12, 2015	1033-018	1.63
The Bears all get jobs at a cupcake store to pay for repairs on their broken laptop: Panda mans the prep stations, Grizzly assists with the point of sale, and Ice dresses up as the mascot.
25	25	"Hibernation"	Eddie Sassen and Madeline Sharafian	Madeline Sharafian	November 19, 2015	1033-024	1.54
Grizzly prepares for hibernation after discovering that he is the only one of his brothers who can do so.
26	26	"Charlie Ball"	Eddie Sassen	Mikey Heller, Spencer Porter, and Shion Takeuchi	February 11, 2016	1039-031	1.28
After Panda injures himself playing basketball, the Bears invite Charlie to be on their team. After figuring out that his height puts him at an advantage, however, Charlie begins to show poor sportsmanship.

=== Season 2 (2016–17) ===
No. overall	No. in season	Title	Written and storyboarded by	Story by	Original release date	Prod. code	U.S. viewers (millions)
27	1	"Yard Sale"	Adam Campbell and Kyler Spears	Mikey Heller and Spencer Porter	February 25, 2016	1039-027	1.28
The Bears find a box full of free stuff at a yard sale resulting in Grizzly getting oversized fists stuck to his hands, Panda following a message on an old cell phone, and Ice Bear watching a pregnancy work out video.
28	2	"Slumber Party"	Eddie Sassen and Bert Youn	Mikey Heller and Spencer Porter	March 3, 2016	1039-028	1.20
A hailstorm forces Chloe to spend the night at the Bears' cave. When Chloe's parents tell the Bears to make sure she stays safe, they go a bit overboard and liven things up by telling scary stories.
29	3	"Bear Cleanse"	Tom Law and Guillermo Martinez	Mikey Heller, Spencer Porter, Molly Prather, and Bert Youn	March 10, 2016	1039-029	1.30
The Bears go on a diet, eating only what their species naturally eats; however, the Bears can't seem to break their old habits.
30	4	"Nom Nom's Entourage"	Adam Campbell, Kyler Spears, and Louie Zong	Mikey Heller, Spencer Porter, and Molly Prather	March 17, 2016	1039-030	1.20
After being embarrassed by an Internet prankster named Andy Bangs (Bo Burnham), Nom Nom enlists the Bears as his new entourage.
31	5	"Ranger Tabes"	Madeline Sharafian and Kyler Spears	Danny Ducker, Mikey Heller, Edi Patterson, and Spencer Porter	March 31, 2016	1039-033	1.20
The Bears order a package, but when it doesn't arrive, the Bears enlist the aid of Ranger Tabes (Cameron Esposito), an overzealous forest ranger with a strong sense of justice.
32	6	"Rooms"	Tom Law, Guillermo Martinez, and Bert Youn	Mikey Heller and Spencer Porter	April 21, 2016	1039-032	1.30
When the Bears switch rooms, they find secrets that they never knew about each other which threatens their relationship.
33	7	"Losing Ice" "Losing Ice Bear"	Guillermo Martinez, Bert Youn, and Louie Zong	Mikey Heller and Spencer Porter	April 28, 2016	1039-034	1.40
Feeling unappreciated and ignored, Ice Bear leaves his brothers to be a chef at a Japanese grill. Meanwhile, Grizzly and Panda hire Darrell (Mel Rodriguez), a mousepad salesman, to be their new third brother.
34	8	"Cellie"	Tom Law and Eddie Sassen	Mikey Heller, Spencer Porter, and Shion Takeuchi	May 5, 2016	1039-035	1.20
Panda is consumed with envy when his brothers get new smartphones after ending their share with his phone.
35	9	"Fashion Bears"	Christina Chang, Kyler Spears, and Bert Youn	Mikey Heller, Spencer Porter, and Shion Takeuchi	August 1, 2016 (Note: This episode was first released online on June 30, 2016.)	1039-036	1.23
The Bears' lives change after they buy new clothes; Grizzly becomes an employee for a company, Panda gets an adrenaline junkie girlfriend named Samantha (Kimiko Glenn), and Ice Bear becomes a fashion model.
36	10	"The Island"	Eddie Sassen and Louie Zong	Mikey Heller, Trevor Jimenez, and Spencer Porter	August 2, 2016 (Note: This episode was first released online on July 8, 2016.)	1039-037	1.22
The Baby Bears get stranded on a deserted island, where they meet two castaways named Dave (Jake Johnson) and Karla (Felicia Day). Together, they try to find a way to get off, but when the bears find out that Dave is sabotaging their quest to have Karla all to himself, they must rescue her and escape the island.
37	11	"Bear Flu"	Christina Chang and Guillermo Martinez	Mikey Heller and Spencer Porter	August 3, 2016 (Note: This episode was first released online on July 15, 2016.)	1039-039	1.28
After swimming in a dirty lake, the Bears think they have "bear flu" and Chloe decides to take care of them. However, when her efforts make things worse, she must take the Bears to the doctor before the hazmats capture them.
38	12	"Chicken and Waffles"	Christina Chang and Tom Law	Mikey Heller and Spencer Porter	August 4, 2016	1039-043	1.05
Panda struggles to meet his brothers at a fancy restaurant after accidentally breaking his contacts. With no way of seeing, he has to ask Charlie to navigate him through the city, much of a challenge for both of them.
39	13	"The Audition"	Danny Ducker, Guillermo Martinez, and Bert Youn	Mikey Heller and Spencer Porter	August 5, 2016 (Note: This episode was first released online on July 22, 2016.)	1039-045	1.10
The Bears audition to be the next mascot for their favorite cereal, Freshy Bear.
40	14	"Captain Craboo"	Eddie Sassen, Bert Youn, Kyler Spears, and Louie Zong	Danny Ducker, Mikey Heller, Spencer Porter, Eddie Sassen, and Louie Zong	September 5, 2016 (Note: This episode was first aired on May 19, 2016 in Korea and then released online in the US on August 8, 2016.)	1039-041	1.18
41	15	"Captain Craboo"	Eddie Sassen, Bert Youn, Kyler Spears, and Louie Zong	Danny Ducker, Mikey Heller, Spencer Porter, Eddie Sassen, and Louie Zong	September 5, 2016	1039-042	1.18
Part One: In the first ever half-hour special, the Bears are reunited with their pet crab, Captain Craboo. However, Ice Bear still holds a grudge from what Craboo did in "Emergency", but eventually starts to warm up to the crustacean. When Grizzly and Panda decide to take Craboo to the pet store, they run into Nom Nom, then things take a turn for the worse when Craboo causes Nom Nom to put the Bears on trial. Part Two: After being deemed guilty, the Bears must now live life on the lam, but when the cops track their location, they must outrun the police to arrive at the ocean and let Craboo go instead of letting them take Craboo away forever.
42	16	"Baby Bears on a Plane"	Tom Law, Eddie Sassen, and Louie Zong	Mikey Heller, Spencer Porter, and Eddie Sassen	October 6, 2016	1039-040	1.03
The Baby Bears cause havoc for people on board a plane to Sweden for their pancakes.
43	17	"Yuri and the Bear"	Eddie Sassen	Mikey Heller, Trevor Jimenez, Spencer Porter, and Eddie Sassen	October 13, 2016	1039-051	1.04
While living alone in the arctic, Baby Ice Bear meets a mysterious Russian man named Yuri (Darin De Paul) who helps him survive the frigid environment. However, when Ice Bear uncovers Yuri's tragic past, their newfound relationship begins to spiral into another tragedy. Absent: Grizzly and Panda
44	18	"Icy Nights"	Eddie Sassen and Kyler Spears	Mikey Heller, Spencer Porter, and Eddie Sassen	October 20, 2016	1039-044	1.08
When Ice Bear's roomba gets stolen by a gang of techies, he must navigate the city's underground world to retrieve it.
45	19	"Everyone's Tube"	Danny Ducker, Eddie Sassen, and Louie Zong	Mikey Heller, Spencer Porter, and Eddie Sassen	October 27, 2016	1039-047	1.01
An anonymous person clicks on a variety of musical videos uploaded by the Bears in a compilation style, and we catch a glimpse of what the Bears have uploaded.
46	20	"Creature Mysteries"	Christina Chang and Tom Law	Mikey Heller, Spencer Porter, and Eddie Sassen	November 3, 2016	1039-046	1.04
After learning that Ranger Tabes is investigating Charlie, the Bears split up to ensure their friend's safety.
47	21	"The Library"	Christina Chang, Kyler Spears, and Louie Zong	Danny Ducker, Mikey Heller, Spencer Porter, and Eddie Sassen	November 10, 2016	1039-048	1.09
The Bears help Chloe study for an exam, but accidentally make things harder for her when they give her a sugar rush.
48	22	"Grizz Helps"	Madeline Sharafian and Louie Zong	Mikey Heller, Spencer Porter, and Eddie Sassen	November 17, 2016	1039-049	1.05
When his brothers don't need his help for the day, Grizzly leaves the cave to help anyone in need. He ends up getting tasked with finding an old lady's pet chicken and meets a deranged scientist (Jason Mantzoukas).
49	23	"Christmas Parties"	Christina Chang, Kyler Spears, Bert Youn, and Louie Zong	Mikey Heller, Spencer Porter, and Eddie Sassen	December 1, 2016	1039-052	1.13
In order to attend Nom Nom's celebrity Christmas party, the bears must stop by their friends' parties first, but find it troubling when they can only stay for limited time each party in order to make it to Nom Nom's party. However, the party wasn't worth it, and the Bears must make up for their friends.
50	24	"Subway"	Christina Chang and Tom Law	Mikey Heller, Kristi Korzec, and Eddie Sassen	April 4, 2017 (Note: This episode was first released online on December 4, 2016.)	TBA	1.13
The Bears become stranded on a subway platform after missing their train, but while waiting, they must recover some lost items.
51	25	"Panda's Friend"	Tom Law and Bert Youn	Mikey Heller, Trevor Jimenez, Spencer Porter, and Eddie Sassen	April 6, 2017 (Note: This episode was first aired on December 11, 2016 in Korea)	1039-050	1.01
Panda meets Tom (Bert Youn), a guy who acts, looks like, and likes the same things as him. Their friendship starts to grow but soon it gets out of hand when Panda realizes Tom is a bit too obsessive.
52	26	"Neighbors"	Kyler Spears and Bert Youn	Mikey Heller, Kristi Korzec, and Eddie Sassen	April 11, 2017	1049-055	0.86
An elderly couple (Robert Clotworthy & Frances Conroy) set up camp next to the cave. The Bears love it at first, but when Grizzly overhears them talking about their questionable previous bear encounters, he begins an investigation.

=== Season 3 (2017–18) ===
No. overall	No. in season	Title	Written and storyboarded by	Story by	Original release date	Prod. code	U.S. viewers (millions)
53	1	"Grizzly: The Movie"	Kyler Spears and Bert Youn	Mikey Heller and Eddie Sassen	April 3, 2017	1049-062	1.13
Grizzly gets cast in a movie about a grizzly bear, but when he realizes that the movie is a horror film about a killer grizzly bear, he begins to have second thoughts.
54	2	"Anger Management"	Christina Chang and Tom Law	Mikey Heller, Kristi Korzec, and Eddie Sassen	April 5, 2017	1049-067	0.87
In order to appear on a successful kids show, Nom Nom must complete anger management with Grizzly as his therapist. Absent: Panda and Ice Bear
55	3	"$100"	Christina Chang and Tom Law	Mikey Heller, Kristi Korzec, Spencer Porter, and Eddie Sassen	April 10, 2017	1049-057	0.77
When the Baby Bears find a $100 bill, they can't seem to let it go, and start to take it under its care. But then they realize someone is after it and they try everything to protect it.
56	4	"Professor Lampwick"	Louie Zong	Mikey Heller, Kristi Korzec, and Eddie Sassen	April 12, 2017	1049-060	0.94
When Chloe's professor (Malcolm McDowell) is too sadistic and cruel to give her any face time to talk over her failing grade, the Bears take matters into their own hands by kidnapping him. However, this professor turns out to be rather conniving and has the Bears turn on each other.
57	5	"Ralph"	Eddie Sassen and Louie Zong	Danny Gendron, Mikey Heller, and Eddie Sassen	April 13, 2017	TBA	0.90
Charlie meets a creature just like him named Ralph (John DiMaggio) and befriends him, but Ralph turns out to be a cruel prankster which troubles the Bears.
58	6	"Planet Bears"	Guillermo Martinez	Mikey Heller, Kristi Korzec, and Eddie Sassen	April 17, 2017	1049-069	0.83
In a BBC-style nature documentary, an omniscient narrator (Jeremy Crutchley) covers the bears' morning when they run out of food and must head to the grocery store. But trouble is on the way.
59	7	"Coffee Cave"	Kyler Spears and Bert Youn	Mikey Heller, Kristi Korzec, and Eddie Sassen	April 18, 2017	1049-066	0.76
When they learn that Ice Bear is a talented barista, the bears turn the cave into a popular coffee shop. However, things go awry when in order to keep up their coffee's quality, Grizzly and Panda give Ice Bear some caffeine despite his warnings, to their stupidity.
60	8	"Charlie's Big Foot"	Eddie Sassen and Louie Zong	Mikey Heller, Kristi Korzec, and Eddie Sassen	April 19, 2017	1049-065	0.93
When Charlie hurts his foot while trying to adjust the Bears' satellite dish, the Bears must sneak him into a hospital for medical assistance.
61	9	"The Demon"	Kyler Spears and Bert Youn	Mikey Heller and Kristi Korzec	April 20, 2017	1049-068	0.77
While playing with a potato gun, Chloe and Ice Bear lose her prized hoodie to the dog, nicknamed The Demon, next door so they set out on a mission to retrieve it. Absent: Grizzly and Panda
62	10	"Panda's Art"	Christina Chang and Tom Law	Mikey Heller, Kristi Korzec, Eddie Sassen, and Madeline Sharafian	April 24, 2017	1049-075	0.82
When Panda paints a picture of Charlie, he gives it to him, but when an art dealer becomes intrigued in the painting, Panda must get it back from Charlie.
63	11	"Poppy Rangers"	Eddie Sassen and Louie Zong	Mikey Heller and Kristi Korzec	April 25, 2017	1049-070	0.96
Ranger Tabes leads a troop of young girls into a cave expedition, and brings Grizzly as their cave expert. However, things get intense when Tabes and Grizzly butt heads. Absent: Panda and Ice Bear
64	12	"Lucy's Brother"	Eddie Sassen	Mikey Heller, Kristi Korzec, and Eddie Sassen	April 26, 2017	1049-059	0.84
While Grizzly and Ice Bear help Lucy with her deliveries, Panda tries to impress Lucy by taking care of her allergic younger brother, Clifford (Hudson West).
65	13	"The Fair"	Sang Yup Lee and Louie Zong	Christina Chang, Mikey Heller, Kristi Korzec, and Sarah Sobole	August 7, 2017	1049-058	0.80
The Baby Bears become prizes for a carnival game in hopes of being won and taken to a new home, but the game owner ("Weird Al" Yankovic) will do anything to keep the Bears from leaving for profit made.
66	14	"Private Lake"	Christina Chang and Tom Law	Mikey Heller and Kristi Korzec	August 8, 2017	1049-074	0.87
When the local lake is overcrowded with tourists, the Bears have fun at Charlie's private lake. However, trouble rises when the Bears mistakenly make its presence known on social media.
67	15	"Lunch with Tabes"	Eddie Sassen and Sarah Sobole	Mikey Heller and Kristi Korzec	August 9, 2017	1049-061	0.76
The Bears have lunch with Ranger Tabes, but when Tabes's lunch gets stolen, Tabes goes into full on detective mode to find the culprit.
68	16	"Road Trip"	Kyler Spears and Bert Youn	Mikey Heller, Kristi Korzec, and Eddie Sassen	August 10, 2017	1049-063	0.95
Chloe and the Bears take a road trip to see a meteor shower. Ice Bear, the only one licensed to drive, is put in charge, which becomes harder than he thought, especially when they pick up a hitchhiker named Wyatt (Ron Funches).
69	17	"Summer Love"	Christina Chang and Tom Law	Mikey Heller and Kristi Korzec	August 11, 2017	1049-076	0.74
Panda goes on a mission to return a lost phone to the girl of his dreams (Stephanie Sheh) and encounters various obstacles along the way including the Mad Scientist from "Grizz Helps". Absent: Grizzly and Ice Bear
70	18	"The Kitty"	Sang Yup Lee and Guillermo Martinez	Mikey Heller and Kristi Korzec	September 1, 2017	1049-080	0.82
The Bears encounter a kitten that they decide to adopt and name Thunderbolt, however they quickly discover that the kitten is actually a cougar cub and that its cougar family have made themselves at home in the cave, which they must retrieve back.
71	19	"Crowbar Jones"	Guillermo Martinez and Eddie Sassen	Danny Gendron, Mikey Heller, and Kristi Korzec	September 1, 2017	1049-056	0.82
Grizzly screens an epic amateur movie he just made for a focus group, but when he notices people and animals are leaving he must figure out ways to keep the audience engaged.
72	20	"Kyle"	Kyler Spears and Bert Youn	Mikey Heller and Kristi Korzec	September 8, 2017	1049-073	0.82
After talking about his lost family on a talk show, Nom Nom is met with another Koala named Kyle (Rhys Darby) who claims to be his brother. However, Nom Nom's bodyguard begins to have his suspicions. Absent: Grizzly, Panda, and Ice Bear
73	21	"Citizen Tabes"	Sang Yup Lee and Louie Zong	Mikey Heller and Kristi Korzec	September 15, 2017	1049-077	0.80
After Ranger Tabes accidentally breaks a deer's antler, she quits her job and turns to an online craft service, the Bears do what they can to coax her out of retirement when they realize nature's not the same without her.
74	22	"Dance Lessons"	Sang Yup Lee and Louie Zong	Mikey Heller and Kristi Korzec	September 22, 2017	1049-082	0.73
Panda volunteers to be Lucy's partner for a dance contest to win a produce truck. But Panda doesn't have the heart to tell Lucy that she's a terrible dancer. His attempts to forfeit the contest soon hurt his friend's feelings.
75	23	"Icy Nights II"	Eddie Sassen	Mikey Heller, Kristi Korzec, and Eddie Sassen	September 29, 2017	1049-078	0.83
Ice Bear gets a sinister message from Barry (Kevin McHale) and must rescue his friend Yana (Margarita Levieva). He falls into a trap and both he and Yana must escape.
76	24	"Dog Hotel"	Christina Chang and Tom Law	Mikey Heller and Kristi Korzec	October 6, 2017	1049-081	0.77
After Grizzly caused a roach infestation carelessly in the cave, the Bears check into the Waggington Dog Hotel for the night. Panda and Ice Bear leave due to disliking the hotel's rules, but Grizzly wants to stay. When he gets mistaken for a rabid dog after eating a pie, his brothers must save him before being taken to an animal pound.
77	25	"Bear Lift"	Eddie Sassen and Sarah Sobole	Mikey Heller and Kristi Korzec	October 13, 2017	1049-092	0.78
To raise money to save Darrell's store, the Bears use the stack as a taxi through a ride share app, eventually they run into Darrell's landlord and the Bears must outrun him before the landlord gets to Darrell's store and tears it down.
78	26	"The Nom Nom Show"	Christina Chang and Tom Law	Mikey Heller and Kristi Korzec	October 13, 2017	1049-088	0.78
During Nom Nom's new TV show, all his special guests end up unable to appear, so Nom Nom hires the Bears as the replacements, but each act gets ruined by their antics.
79	27	"Ice Cave"	Kyler Spears and Bert Youn	Mikey Heller and Kristi Korzec	October 20, 2017	1049-086	0.93
After being excluded from a board game with the Bears and Charlie because of his attitude, Ralph takes over the Bear's cave overnight and turns it into a snowy fortress where he reigns as king over everybody.
80	28	"Spa Day"	Kyler Spears and Bert Youn	Mikey Heller and Kristi Korzec	October 20, 2017	1049-093	0.93
The Bears have a relaxing day at the spa. Grizzly tries to get everything the spa has to offer, Panda gets trapped in the steam room with an old man, and Ice Bear plays ping pong.
81	29	"Charlie's Halloween Thing"	Kyler Spears and Bert Youn	Mikey Heller and Kristi Korzec	October 27, 2017	1049-079	0.91
Charlie tells a group of trick or treaters two scary stories for Halloween: The Bears buy three dolls that look like them that come to life and try to murder them, and Grizzly accidentally bites Chloe who slowly transforms into a werebear.
82	30	"Bunnies"	Christina Chang and Tom Law	Mikey Heller, Kristi Korzec, and Louie Zong	November 3, 2017	1049-071	0.88
After leaving the Boise Fair one week later, the baby bears walked a long mile to the Denver Chocolate Fest. Down the highway, they encounter a burrow of bunnies who are constantly under attack by crows. Grizzly and Ice Bear want to help them, but Panda is determined to get to the festival.
83	31	"Pigeons"	Sang Yup Lee and Louie Zong	Mikey Heller and Kristi Korzec	November 3, 2017	1049-098	0.88
Grizzly befriends a single footed pigeon named Brenda and her friends. When they ask him to help break out more of their pigeon brethren, Grizzly is willing to help, only to discover that she and her fellow pigeons are part of the pigeon cartel from "Our Stuff" and are using him to break into state prison.
84	32	"Panda 2"	Eddie Sassen and Sarah Sobole	Mikey Heller and Kristi Korzec	November 10, 2017	1049-072	0.91
In a Chinese panda enclosure, Baby Panda spends everyday doing the same thing without a care in the world. That all changes when a stuffed panda, dubbed Panda 2, arrives and "persuades" Panda to leave his boundaries and adventure outside. Absent: Grizzly and Ice Bear
85	33	"Tubin'"	Kyler Spears and Bert Youn	Mikey Heller and Kristi Korzec	November 10, 2017	1049-094	0.91
In search of adventure, the Bears go tubing down a dangerous river. Panda dislikes it for a while, but Grizzly and Ice Bear are all about it. However, when Panda starts to enjoy it, the bears get separated through dangerous rapids, and Panda ends up in a vegan tribe which Grizzly and Ice Bear must save him from.
86	34	"Lazer Royale"	Christina Chang and Tom Law	Mikey Heller and Kristi Korzec	November 17, 2017	1049-091	0.80
When the Baby Bears hear about a laser tag game that will win them an ice cream sundae, they decide to play. However, when they enter the room, they find it's not all it seemed when the game turns into a warzone.
87	35	"Ranger Games"	Eddie Sassen and Sarah Sobole	Mikey Heller and Kristi Korzec	November 17, 2017	1049-095	0.75
Ranger Tabes once again leads the Poppy Rangers in a kickball tournament against their rivals Ranger Zhao (Ming-Na Wen) and the Ivy Rangers. Grizzly comes along as a cheerleader, but when Wallace hurts her ankle, he gets promoted to player. Absent: Panda and Ice Bear
88	36	"The Perfect Tree"	Eddie Sassen and Sarah Sobole	Mikey Heller and Kristi Korzec	December 1, 2017	1049-090	0.79
Chloe and Ice Bear drive up north to find the perfect Christmas tree and while looking for one, they stumble upon a wild turkey while Grizzly and Panda are left in charge to decorate Chloe's house but have a lot of trouble.
89	37	"Bearz II Men"	Sang Yup Lee and Louie Zong	Mikey Heller, Kristi Korzec, and Branson Reese	January 5, 2018	1049-106	1.10
The Baby Bears help a teenager named Nate (Gallant) accomplish his dream of being a famous singer, but when he wants to enter a talent show and can only enter with the accompany of a guardian, the Baby Bears disguise themselves as Nate's father.
90	38	"Bro Brawl"	Charlie Parisi and Sarah Sobole	Kelsy Abbott and Mikey Heller	January 5, 2018	1049-100	1.10
The Bears participate in a brother-themed game show against Panda's BFF, Tom and his roommates Griff (Faruq Taheed) and Isaac (Demetri Martin) for a brand new luxury apartment, but when Panda hears that Tom can't afford his current apartment anymore and that he and his roommates might split up, Panda might have to sacrifice the game.
91	39	"Hurricane Hal"	Sang Yup Lee and Louie Zong	Mikey Heller	January 12, 2018	1049-101	0.90
Professor Lampwick covers how everything is connected to the Bears when a hurricane rolls in. When the Bears are in three different locations, Grizzly looks after Ranger Tabes' Poppy Rangers, Panda is stuck with Charlie in his car in the forest, and Chloe and Ice Bear are in the Bay Area seeking a ride home.
92	40	"Vacation"	Kyler Spears and Bert Youn	Mikey Heller, Kristi Korzec, and Branson Reese	January 19, 2018	1049-103	0.83
Nom Nom's stress levels spike due to an unexpected resurgence in his popularity. At the suggestion of his doctor (Avery Waddell), Nom Nom decides to take a vacation at a eucalyptus spa. His doctor assigns Grizzly as his "comfort pet", who must protect him from his ravid fans or else his stress levels will cause him to die. Absent: Panda and Ice Bear
93	41	"Beehive"	Christina Chang and Tom Law	Mikey Heller and Kristi Korzec	January 26, 2018	1049-083	0.80
The Bears and Ranger Tabes find a beehive. When Tabes leaves so she can remove it safely, the Bears taste the honey and become entranced. They turn their cave into a large beehive and start serving the queen bee for more honey forcing Tabes to come to their rescue in removing the hive.
94	42	"The Park"	Kyler Spears and Bert Youn	Mikey Heller and Kristi Korzec	February 2, 2018	1049-102	0.67
The Bears spend a day at the park. Grizzly works out, but has his bag stolen by someone, Panda attempts to sell his artwork and gets picked up by a police officer on a horse and Ice Bear trains some kids at a playground his martial arts knowledge.
95	43	"I Am Ice Bear"	Sang Yup Lee and Sarah Sobole	Mikey Heller and Kristi Korzec	February 9, 2018	1049-107	0.76
After Ice Bear hits his head, he suddenly takes on a more social, talkative and "cooler" personality which pleases Grizzly and Panda, but when he begins to abandon them and become a jerk, they must find a way to turn their brother back to normal.
96	44	"Baby Bears Can't Jump"	Sang Yup Lee and Louie Zong	Mikey Heller and Kristi Korzec	February 16, 2018	1049-085	0.71
In order to win a pizza, the Baby Bears play basketball against a ragtag gang of kids. They end up getting help in the form of a Charles Barkley card who teaches them teamwork and in the process, the Bears learn their signature "Bearstack".

=== Season 4 (2018–19) ===
No. overall	No. in season	Title	Written and storyboarded by	Story by	Original release date	U.S. viewers (millions)
97	1	"Go Fish"	Christina Chang and Eddie Sassen	Mikey Heller and Kristi Korzec	July 30, 2018	0.35
The Bears go on a fishing trip with a dramatic sea captain who claims to be after a large orange fish. The fish turns out to be real and swallows the captain leaving the Bears on a slowly sinking ship. However, Grizzly soon realizes that they have an unusual past connection with the creature.
98	2	"Teacher's Pet"	Sang Yup Lee and Charlie Parisi	Danny Ducker, Mikey Heller, and Kristi Korzec	July 30, 2018	0.40
The Baby Bears end up at "Gifted Elementary" where they end up becoming star students, but earn the ire of their classmates by becoming "teacher's pets". They decide to cause trouble to regain their respect, but Baby Grizz is sent to the principal's office and Baby Panda and Baby Ice Bear must rescue him.
99	3	"Googs"	Sarah Sobole and Louie Zong	Mikey Heller	July 30, 2018	0.50
Panda wins a contest to take a tour of the Googs headquarters with his disruptive brothers and are led around by a hologram of the Googs mascot Shmorby (Griffin McElroy). Panda meets Googs founder Ari Curd (Jane Leeves) who plans to launch Panda into space.
100	4	"Paperboyz"	Louie Zong	Mikey Heller and Kristi Korzec	July 30, 2018	0.65
The Baby Bears get jobs as paper boys where they are mildly successful. Their boss Mr. Howard (Paul Rugg) informs them that they only have one slot opening left. To resolve the issue, the Bears have a paper delivery contest that turns them against each other.
101	5	"Bear Squad"	Sang Yup Lee and Charlie Parisi	Mikey Heller	July 30, 2018	0.77
When a fox steals the Bears' things, as well as other people's stuff in the city, the Bears call Tabes to help them. Due to her not being allowed to work in the city due to her recklessness, she deputizes the Bears to catch the thief who is hiding in a condemned building.
102	6	"Lil' Squid"	Christina Chang and Tom Law	Mikey Heller	July 30, 2018	0.71
The Baby Bears meet a baby squid that will not leave them alone. They decide to find its family at the aquarium and they build a submarine using a diving helmet and venture into the exhibit where they encounter a dangerous eel that damages their craft.
103	7	"I, Butler"	Charlie Parisi and Sarah Sobole	Mikey Heller and Kristi Korzec	July 30, 2018	0.65
While in the middle of their spring cleaning, the Bears discover Ice Bear's old project, a robot clone. He rebuilds it as Butler Bear and they have him clean around the cave. However, Butler Bear does his job too well and becomes a terrifying cleaning machine.
104	8	"Family Troubles"	Charlie Parisi and Sarah Sobole	Mikey Heller, Kristi Korzec, and Kris Mukai	July 30, 2018	0.56
Baby Grizz stars in a Canadian sitcom called Family Troubles of which he is the star. However, the director decides to shake up the show by introducing Cousin Lorenzo (Henry Kaufman) to the cast. Feeling threatened, Baby Grizz challenges Lorenzo to a race around the studio. Absent: Panda and Ice Bear
105	9	"Best Bears"	Guillermo Martinez	Mikey Heller	August 6, 2018	0.50
Darrell is marrying his girlfriend Sofia (Brigitte Kali Canales). With 30 minutes left until the wedding, the Bears rush to get the rings, cake and vows. While successful, Darrell suddenly gets cold feet as he feels that the wonderful Sofia is too cool for him.
106	10	"Crowbar Jones: Origins"	Guillermo Martinez	Mikey Heller	August 7, 2018	0.54
While Nom Nom attempts to go about his day, Grizzly pitches his unfinished film Crowbar Jones: Origins to him after Nom Nom is unable to be cast in another action film. Nom Nom hates it, but suddenly finds himself in need of saving by Grizzly.
107	11	"Hot Sauce"	Roan Everly and Eddie Sassen	Mikey Heller and Minty Lewis	August 8, 2018	0.56
The Bears are baffled when their favorite hot sauce "Sir-Cha-Cha" is out. They find a new sauce "Sir-Coo-Coo", but learn that it is from a stolen stash of sauce. The cops have the Bears go undercover and they discover their arch-enemies the Pigeon Cartel are behind the theft.
108	12	"Mom App"	Christina Chang and Sarah Sobole	Mikey Heller	August 9, 2018	0.43
The Bears download the mom app and hire surrogate mothers including supportive Gayle (Channon Dade), posh Linda (Tsai Chin) and buff Tank (Jane Lynch). However, the Bears are dissatisfied with each of them until they learn from a real mother.
109	13	"The Limo"	Christina Chang and Guillermo Martinez	Mikey Heller and Kristi Korzec	August 10, 2018	0.48
Panda is devastated to learn that Lucy has a boyfriend named Kale (Omid Abtahi). To cheer him up, Grizzly and Ice Bear rent a limo and turn it into a club during a traffic jam. When Lucy and Kale arrive, Panda flees and runs into T-Pain who gives Panda some advice.
110	14	"More Everyone's Tube"	Sang Yup Lee and Louie Zong	Mikey Heller and Kristi Korzec	August 13, 2018	0.41
The Bros browse videos on Everyone's Tube featuring the Bears and their friends partaking in musical misadventures including Grizzly and Panda pranking Ice Bear, Tabes' pine cone lesson, an ursinologist (Leslie Odom Jr.) teaching the Bears and Estelle singing the full theme.
111	15	"Money Man"	Kyler Spears and Bert Youn	Mikey Heller and Kristi Korzec	August 14, 2018	0.49
The Bears help Chloe present her mind reading device to college head Dr. Bean (Michael Gough) for a contest. Chloe's rival, Saanvi Patel (Kody Kavitha), makes things difficult with her navigational device. The two must work together when Dr. Bean suddenly wanders off.
112	16	"Rescue Ranger"	Kyler Spears and Bert Youn	Mikey Heller and Kristi Korzec	August 15, 2018	0.49
The Bears finally reveal to Tabes their friend Charlie after she spots him eating cheesy poofs. Unfortunately, Charlie is captured by the Booby Trapper (Jemaine Clement) who believes Charlie is a Yowie forcing Tabes and the Bears to rescue him from being revealed to the world.
113	17	"El Oso"	Eddie Sassen	Mikey Heller, Kristi Korzec, and Eddie Sassen	August 16, 2018	0.53
In 1913 Mexico, Charlie comes across minor criminal El Oso (Jorge Diaz) and befriends him until he is confronted by his treacherous gang consisting of Chuckles and Knives (Arnie Pantoja) and their leader Blue-Eye Ramon (Dan Navarro) who think he is El Chupacabra. Absent: Grizzly, Panda, and Ice Bear
114	18	"Charlie's Halloween Thing 2"	Sang Yup Lee, Sarah Sobole, Charlie Parisi, and Louie Zong	Mikey Heller, Kristi Korzec, Sang Yup Lee, and Branson Reese	October 19, 2018	0.63
115	19	"Charlie's Halloween Thing 2"	Sang Yup Lee, Sarah Sobole, Charlie Parisi, and Louie Zong	Mikey Heller, Kristi Korzec, Sang Yup Lee, and Branson Reese	October 19, 2018	0.63
Charlie once again hosts a Halloween episode with four stories. First, the Bears end up in the middle of a zombie attack when a strange meteorite crashes in the woods, then the Baby Bears stay the night at a creepy Scooby-Doo-inspired house for Halloween. Next, Chloe and the Bears must deal with a virus-troll hybrid (Alex Hirsch) who manifests itself in their cave and finally, Charlie finds a wishing machine named Zohar and tries to wish to be "normal" with disastrous consequences.
116	20	"Escandalosos"	Guillermo Martinez	Mikey Heller	November 5, 2018	0.67
A famous Luchador named Rodolfo (Antonio Alvarez) tells his son (Nathan Arenas) the tale of when he was a little boy and befriended the "ositos". When Rodolfo breaks his leg before the big Luchador tournament, the Baby Bears step in as the "Escandalosos" in order to win money for him and his sick dog.
117	21	"Pizza Band"	Sarah Sobole and Louie Zong	Mikey Heller and Kris Mukai	November 6, 2018	0.60
The Bears decide to get pizza at Papa Bear's Pizza Cavern and discover that they still use a terrible animatronic band. When the band breaks, the Bears replace them and lip sync to the original audio (Steve Harwell) and end up becoming famous; going on tour in the process.
118	22	"Adopted"	Katie Mitroff, Charlie Parisi, and Sang Yup Lee	Mikey Heller and Kris Mukai	November 7, 2018	0.57
The Baby Bears end up at an auction and get adopted by an eccentric millionaire named Charles Willoughby-Wentworth (Taran Killam) who lets them stay at his mansion. However, it is revealed that he wants them for Carl, his pet gorilla, to play with them after he destroyed all of his stuffed teddy bears.
119	23	"Wingmen"	Christina Chang and Hanna Cho	Mikey Heller and Kris Mukai	November 8, 2018	0.59
The Bears are awoken in the middle of the night by a Red-Tippered Larkatoo, a very rare and loud bird. The Larkatoo continues to make noise because he needs to find a mate, so the Bears become his wingmen and create an all animal prom so that they can go to sleep.
120	24	"Braces"	Sang Yup Lee and Charlie Parisi	Mikey Heller and Kris Mukai	November 9, 2018	0.58
Dr. Clark gives Panda a set of ugly braces that humiliate him in public. He later discovers that the braces give him control over electrical objects. When people begin acting mean to him, he starts abusing his powers prompting Grizzly and Ice Bear to stop him.
121	25	"Christmas Movies"	Christina Chang and Hanna Cho	Mikey Heller	December 17, 2018	0.51
On Christmas Eve, the Baby Bears are working at Last Weekend Video and stay the night when the owner locks up. A thief named Harry (David Hornsby) breaks in posing as Santa to rob the place, but the Baby Bears see through his disguise and try to apprehend him.
122	26	"Imaginary Friend"	Guillermo Martinez	Mikey Heller and Kris Mukai	January 28, 2019	0.41
After watching Ultra Meteorite Fighters, the Baby Bears decide to play pretend only for them to realize that they need a fourth member. They opt to create an imaginary friend named Silver Bear (Jason David Frank), but his heroic persona ends up causing trouble for the Bears whose imagination suddenly gets out of hand.
123	27	"The Mall"	Sang Yup Lee and Charlie Parisi	Mikey Heller	February 4, 2019	0.63
The Bears head to the mall and reunite with the Bros. Grizzly joins Griff's job of being a mall cop and try to look for action, Panda and Tom get in line to see Estellar (Estelle) and end up getting chased by angry fans and Ice Bear and Isaac compete in an ice skating tournament being held at the mall.
124	28	"Tunnels"	Christina Chang, Yvonne Hsuan Ho, and Eddie Sassen	Mikey Heller and Kris Mukai	February 11, 2019	0.51
While looking for Vol. 1 of Adventure Ocelot, the Bears discover a hole underneath Panda's bed. As their house begins to sink, they venture down and discover a network of tunnels that have all been dug out by moles who have been reading Panda's manga and have turned their tunnels into a place of worship for the books.
125	29	"Ramen"	Christina Chang and Yvonne Hsuan Ho	Mikey Heller and Kris Mukai	February 18, 2019	0.64
While traveling through a hot sunny day in Japan, the Baby Bears come across Kazumi (Romi Dames), a struggling ramen chef who fears that her restaurant will be closed down by her father Keiji (Yuki Matsuzaki). The Bears decide to help her perfect her dishes by looking for the best ingredients in the hopes of impressing Keiji.
126	30	"The Gym"	Sang Yup Lee and Charlie Parisi	Mikey Heller and Kris Mukai	February 25, 2019	0.53
At the suggestion of a member, the Bears decide to go to Mystique Physique Gym in see if they are "gym material". Grizzly takes part in rock wall climbing only to be outdone by a child, Panda takes up virtual biking that goes from calm to terrifying and Ice Bear takes a tai chi class where he goes up against some intimidating old ladies.
127	31	"Bubble"	Sarah Sobole and Louie Zong	Mikey Heller and Kris Mukai	March 4, 2019	0.55
After watching a horror movie called Germs, Panda becomes a severe germaphobe. To solve the problem, he purchases a bubble for him to maneuver around in. Grizzly and Ice Bear become annoyed, especially when he starts acting rude towards Charlie, but when Panda gets stuck in a waste dump and unable to escape, Charlie risks everything to save him.
128	32	"Baby Orphan Ninja Bears"	Sang Yup Lee and Charlie Parisi	Mikey Heller, Kris Mukai, and Charlie Parisi	March 11, 2019	0.54
While navigating the New York City sewers, the Baby Bears encounter ninja master Cheddar (Dante Basco) who must stop the Boot Crew, led by his former ally Slice (Greg Chun), from causing mayhem in the city. The Baby Bears decide to become his pupils and learn the ways of the ninja while also having to deal with an alligator in the sewers.
129	33	"Fire!"	Sarah Sobole and Louie Zong	Mikey Heller and Kris Mukai	March 18, 2019	0.43
While enjoying some picnickers' cooking, a small fire accidentally is set in a bush. Grizzly uses his quick thinking to put it out and is made an honorary fire marshal by the local fire department. Grizzly soon becomes obsessed with putting out fires and in his manic haste ends up starting one by accident at a local fish diner.
130	34	"Ranger Norm"	Sarah Sobole and Louie Zong	Mikey Heller and Kris Mukai	March 18, 2019	0.43
Tabes, Martinez and Kirk leave for RangerCon, leaving the Bears with Ranger Norm (Rob Huebel). Norm comes off as nice though the Bears already detest him. When they finally decide to apologize for acting coldly towards him, Norm reveals himself to be an illegal agent for the wealthy planning to tear down the forest for a golf course.
131	35	"Shmorby"	Sarah Sobole and Louie Zong	Mikey Heller, Kris Mukai, and Louie Zong	March 25, 2019	0.52
The Bears get a home assistance device from Googs, due to the events of the titular episode, in the form of Shmorby who fulfills all of their home needs. However, this ends up making the Bears incredibly lazy and they become large and fat. Shmorby becomes tiresome of having to take care of them and leaves when they end up needing him most.
132	36	"Snake Babies"	Danny Ducker and Eddie Sassen	Mikey Heller and Kristi Korzec	March 25, 2019	0.52
While the Bears are playing "corn hole", a visit from Charlie results in him finding six snake eggs. When they hatch, Charlie adopts them as his own and tries to raise them as a single parent. This ends up being more difficult as the Bears think he is unfit and the baby snakes end up tiring Charlie out.
133	37	"Sandcastle"	Christina Chang and Quinne Larsen	Mikey Heller and Kris Mukai	April 1, 2019	0.52
The Baby Bears find themselves at the beach and decide to build a luxurious sandcastle as their new home. Panda falls in love for the first time with a girl named Darla (Vivienne Rutherford) who takes an interest in their home, but soon they have to protect it from her vengeful older sisters and cousins who have come to take Darla back.
134	38	"Bros in the City"	Charlie Parisi and Sarah Sobole	Mikey Heller, Kris Mukai, and Sarah Sobole	April 1, 2019	0.52
The Bears join the Bros on the hit reality show Bros in the City. Panda tries to win the affection of their neighbor Nina (Christine Marie Cabanos) who grows close to Tom, Griff and Grizzly try to dominate as the "Alpha Bro", and Isaac and Ice Bear come across the perfect stove and try to get it into the apartment.
135	39	"Cousin Jon"	Hanna Cho	Mikey Heller and Kris Mukai	April 1, 2019	0.53
The Bears get invited to Chloe's Park Family Reunion where they are warned about her Cousin Jon, a sinister prankster who always gets away with his jokes. After the Bears suffer a series of pranks firsthand, they decide to up the ante by getting back at Jon and giving him a taste of his own medicine.
136	40	"Lord of the Poppies"	Yvonne Hsuan Ho and Sang Yup Lee	Mikey Heller and Kris Mukai	April 1, 2019	0.53
Grizzly, Tabes and the Poppy Rangers head out to an island for their island camping badge. When they forget the lunches, Tabes leaves Grizzly in charge while she heads back to the mainland to get food. Grizzly, in his usual careless self, misleads the rangers to the point that they become insane savages from hunger and attempt to devour Grizzly. Absent: Panda and Ice Bear
137	41	"The Mummy's Curse"	Yvonne Hsuan Ho and Sang Yup Lee	Mikey Heller and Kris Mukai	April 29, 2019	0.45
As the Baby Bears are walking down a road in the middle of nowhere, a mummy falls out of the back of a truck. The amulet it has says that they will be cursed if they do not return it by midnight, so the Baby Bears must get to the museum as fast as they can. However, a couple of shady figures in hats and coats start following them.
138	42	"Band of Outsiders"	Quinne Larsen and Eddie Sassen	Daniel Chong, Mikey Heller, and Kris Mukai	May 6, 2019	0.48
Following "Yuri and the Bear", Baby Ice Bear finds himself in the lower parts of London, struggling to get food and mourning over the loss of Yuri. He eventually encounters a trio of rebel rousers named Badger, Jo, and Ashley, who like to cause trouble. He joins their gang due to his ability with his axe, but soon things begin to take a turn for the worse. Absent: Grizzly and Panda
139	43	"Tabes & Charlie"	Christina Chang and Louie Zong	Mikey Heller, Kristi Korzec, and Kris Mukai	May 13, 2019	0.48
When Kirk goes missing, Tabes leaves the Bears at the ranger station and runs into Charlie. She convinces him to aid in finding her canine friend, but she has to wear a chicken costume to blend in as they enter the shadier parts of the woods for information. Meanwhile, the Bears are having trouble helping a couple of hikers when the printer starts going haywire.
140	44	"Panda's Birthday"	Sang Yup Lee and Charlie Parisi	Mikey Heller and Kris Mukai	May 27, 2019	0.45
To make Panda's birthday better, Grizzly and Ice Bear take him to the hotel where the K-pop group Monsta X is staying. In their usual antics, Grizzly disguised himself as a bellhop, runs afoul of another bellhop who is hungry for tips, Panda finds himself hanging onto dear life outside the hotel and Ice Bear tries to protect the group from crazy members of Monbebe, the Monsta X fan club. Special Guest Star: Monsta X as Themselves Note: Although the movie is considered the series finale, this episode technically serves as the final episode of the series.

== Film ==
On May 30, 2019, Cartoon Network announced We Bare Bears: The Movie. On May 21, 2020, the movie was announced to release digitally on June 30, 2020, and premiered on Cartoon Network on September 7, 2020. The film was also leaked on Amazon on its intended DVD date, June 8, but was removed shortly after.

Title	Directed by	Written and storyboarded by	Original release date	Prod. code	U.S. viewers (millions)
We Bare Bears: The Movie	Daniel Chong	Story by : Mikey Heller and Kris Mukai; Written and Storyboarded by : Christina Chang, Daniel Chong, Alex Chiu, Manny Hernandez, Yvonne Hsuan Ho, Quinne Larsen, Sang Yup Lee, Sooyeon Lee, Charlie Parisi, Eddie Sassen, Sarah Sobole, and Louie Zong	June 30, 2020 (Official Release); September 7, 2020 (Cartoon Network)	998	0.46
When Grizzly, Panda, and Ice Bear's love of food trucks and viral videos get out of hand, it catches the attention of Agent Trout from the National Wildlife Control, who pledges to restore the "natural order" by separating them forever. Chased away from their home, the Bears embark on an epic road trip as they seek refuge in Canada, with their journey being filled with new friends, perilous obstacles, and huge parties. The risky journey also forces the Bears to face how they first met and became brothers, in order to keep their family bond from splitting apart.

== Shorts ==
=== Season 1 (2015) ===
No.	Title	Written and storyboarded by	Original release date	Prod. code
1	"Bear Cleaning"	Guillermo Martinez	July 6, 2015	1033-026C
While cleaning inside the cave, Ice Bear accidentally vacuums Grizzly's fur. He and Panda try to patch it up before Grizzly notices.
2	"Nom Nom vs. Hamster"	Bert Youn	August 3, 2015	1033-026A
Nom Nom has to shoot a viral video with a hamster, but the hamster is uncooperative.
3	"Panda's Dream"	Tom Law and Madeline Sharafian	September 1, 2015	1033-026B
Panda gets cut in line while waiting to buy a video game and fantasizes about heroically standing up for himself. Absent: Grizzly and Ice Bear
4	"Log Ride"	Tom Law	November 2, 2015	1033-026D
The Bears try to ride on a log ride, but when their picture comes out unsatisfactory, they go on the ride numerous times until they get the right snapshot.
5	"Goodnight Ice Bear"	Madeline Sharafian	December 1, 2015	1033-026E
Ice Bear tries to sleep in his fridge, but the door keeps opening by itself. Absent: Grizzly and Panda

=== Season 2 (2016) ===
All of these shorts below (along with "Goodnight Ice Bear") were shown after the initial broadcast of the Teen Titans Go! and The Powerpuff Girls (reboot) crossover special "TTG v PPG" and are part of the show's second season.

No.	Title	Written and storyboarded by	Original release date	Prod. code
1	"Potty Time"	Tom Law	June 30, 2016	1039-038C
Baby Panda has to go to the bathroom so the Baby Bears go on a hunt to find one.
2	"Panda's Profile Pic"	Mikey Heller	June 30, 2016	1039-038B
Panda chats with a woman and she asks him to send her a photo of himself, but his brothers keep messing it up while editing.
3	"Grizz: Ultimate Hero Champion" "Grizzly: Ultimate Hero Champion"	Danny Ducker	June 30, 2016	1039-038E
Grizzly videotapes himself for the "Ultimate Hero Champion", but when the event starts, he fails.
4	"Dreamium"	Louie Zong	June 30, 2016	1039-038D
Panda has trouble sleeping because of Grizzly's yelling, so he downloads an app called "Dreamium", which immediately puts him to sleep, but shortly after turns into a nightmare.
5	"Charlie's Opus"	Eddie Sassen	June 30, 2016	1039-038A
Charlie starts a band with animals, but when he performs a concert that's shown to the Bears, the animals mess up.

=== Season 3 (2017) ===
These five shorts aired as part of the third season and aired together on TV on April 27, 2017. TV Guide and other sources say these shorts make an episode called "We Bare Bears Digital Shorts 3".

No.	Title	Written and storyboarded by	Original release date	Prod. code
1	"Bear Stack"	Louie Zong	April 27, 2017	1049-064C
The Bears are on a video-game style quest to get the last copy of a game at the game store.
2	"Frozen Ice"	Kyler Spears	April 27, 2017	1049-064B
Grizzly and Panda try to melt an ice cube Ice Bear's been frozen solid in.
3	"Assembly Required"	Sarah Sobole	April 27, 2017	1049-064A
The Bears attempt to assemble some furniture they purchased at "Okia".
4	"Cooking with Ice Bear"	Bert Youn	April 27, 2017	1049-064D
Ice Bear prepares Korean food on a cooking show he is hosting.
5	"The Cave"	Mikey Heller and Kris Mukai	April 27, 2017	1049-064E
A bat intrudes the cave at night while the Bears are trying to sleep, and they try various ways of getting it out.
