= Hoppers (film) =

2026 film by Daniel Chong

- Theatrical release poster
- Directed by: Daniel Chong
- Screenplay by: Jesse Andrews
- Story by: Daniel Chong; Jesse Andrews
- Produced by: Nicole Paradis Grindle
- Starring: Piper Curda; Bobby Moynihan; Jon Hamm; Kathy Najimy; Dave Franco
- Cinematography: Jeremy Lasky; Ian Megibben
- Edited by: Axel Geddes
- Music by: Mark Mothersbaugh
- Production company: Pixar Animation Studios
- Distributed by: Walt Disney Studios; Motion Pictures (Note: Distributed under the Walt Disney Pictures banner.)
- Release dates: February 23, 2026 (El Capitan Theatre); March 6, 2026 (United States)
- Running time: 104 minutes
- Country: United States
- Language: English
- Budget: $150 million
- Box office: $389.7 million

Hoppers (Note: Also known as Jumpers in some countries) is a 2026 American animated science fiction comedy film (Note: Attributed to multiple sources:) directed by Daniel Chong from a screenplay by Jesse Andrews and a story by Chong and Andrews. Produced by Pixar Animation Studios for Walt Disney Pictures, the film stars the voices of Piper Curda, Bobby Moynihan, Jon Hamm, Kathy Najimy, and Dave Franco. It follows Mabel Tanaka (Curda), an animal-loving college student who transfers her consciousness into a robotic beaver to communicate with animals and save their habitat from destruction, inadvertently sparking an uprising among them.

Chong began developing Hoppers after returning to Pixar in December 2020, and the project was officially announced in August 2024. Mark Mothersbaugh composed the score, while SZA wrote and performed the end credits song "Save the Day".

Hoppers premiered at the El Capitan Theatre in Los Angeles on February 23, 2026, and was released theatrically in the United States on March 6. The film received positive reviews from critics and grossed $389.7 million worldwide.

== Plot ==
After attempting to free the class pets from their habitats, six-year-old Mabel Tanaka is suspended from school. Frustrated, her mother leaves her with her grandmother, who lives near a glade. Inspired by her grandmother's love of nature, Mabel develops a deep appreciation for wildlife. Thirteen years later, after her parents move away and her grandmother dies, Mabel continues caring for the glade. Beaverton's mayor, Jerry Generazzo, announces plans to route part of his beltway through it, claiming the animals have already left. Mabel, now a student at Beaverton University, unsuccessfully campaigns to stop the project.

While trying to lure the animals back, Mabel discovers that her biology professor, Dr. Sam Fairfax, and colleagues Nisha and Conner have secretly developed the "Hoppers" program, which allows humans to inhabit robotic animals. Ignoring Sam's warning about interfering with wildlife, Mabel hops into a robotic beaver and escapes the lab.

Mistaken for a real beaver, Mabel is brought before George, also a beaver and the Mammal King, who shelters the glade's displaced animals in an overcrowded dam. She discovers Jerry had installed an artificial tree that emits sound waves audible only to animals, driving them away. After Mabel destroys the tree, animals return to the glade. Growing closer to George, she prepares to reveal her identity, but Jerry destroys part of the glade with explosives and installs more sound-emitting trees.

Mabel and George convene the Animal Council, whose members include the monarchs of the insects, fish, amphibians, reptiles, and birds. Though initially indifferent, the Council agrees to help after Mabel warns that Jerry will eventually threaten all of their habitats. However, her speech instead inspires them to assassinate him. While trying to dissuade them, Mabel accidentally kills the Insect Queen, a monarch butterfly. She and George escape as the animals destroy the robotic bodies Nisha and Conner used to spy on the meeting, exposing the humans' deception. The Insect Queen's son, Titus, crowns himself king and assumes control of the Council.

Although initially upset by Mabel's recklessness, George agrees to help protect Jerry. Joined by Loaf the beaver, Tom the lizard, and Ellen the bear, they locate Jerry and force him to drive to the glade in hopes of stopping the project. Seagulls working for the Council attempt to kill him by dropping a shark named Diane onto his car, but the group escapes. When Jerry still refuses to abandon the beltway, an angry Mabel reveals their location to both the Council and the scientists. They arrive and unhook her from the robotic beaver, causing her to faint and revealing her identity to George.

When Mabel awakens, the Council has taken everyone hostage and forced the scientists to build a robotic clone of Jerry for Titus to inhabit, impersonate the mayor, and use the sound trees to massacre the crowd attending Jerry's re-election rally at the glade. Before leaving, Titus condemns Mabel for stealing the technology, deceiving the animals, and using them for her own goals, while Jerry also calls her out for provoking the conflict. Realizing her obsession with saving the glade had only worsened the situation, Mabel reconciles with Jerry, who reluctantly hops into the robotic beaver to help her escape.

At the rally, Mabel fails to persuade Titus to abandon his plan. Jerry, the animals, and the scientists attempt to unhop him, but the effort fails. During the struggle, Titus destroys the robotic beaver, which causes Jerry to be unhopped, and Mabel chases him up a sound tree to retrieve Jerry's phone after knocking it into the branches, tearing away the 3D printed latex mask covering Titus's robotic face and preventing him from using facial recognition to unlock the phone and activate the attack. Enraged, Titus tears down the tree while revealing his plan to have the insects exterminate every other species, turning the Council against him. The falling tree destroys the robot and ignites a wildfire that spreads toward the city. After Titus is eaten by the Amphibian King, the Council, with an ant queen as the new Insect Queen, joins Mabel, George, and the other animals in dismantling the dam, flooding the glade and extinguishing the fire.

Jerry reroutes the beltway, and the glade is designated a protected wildlife preserve. Mabel graduates from college, and although the Hoppers program is defunded because of her actions, Sam hires her as an assistant. Mabel and George remain friends, communicating through text-to-speech software.

== Voice cast ==
- Piper Curda as Mabel Tanaka, a 19-year-old animal-loving Japanese-American college student whose mind is transferred into a robotic beaver
  - Lila Liu as 6-year-old Mabel
- Bobby Moynihan as King George (Mammal King), an optimistic beaver monarch
- Jon Hamm as Jerry Generazzo, the greedy Mayor of Beaverton whom Mabel is often at odds with
- Kathy Najimy as Dr. Sam Fairfax, Mabel's biology professor who created the Hopper technology
- Dave Franco as Titus (Insect King), an evil butterfly and the Insect Queen's son who later succeeds her
  - Eman Abdul-Razzak as Young Titus (Insect Prince), a caterpillar
- Eduardo Franco as Loaf, a slow yet staunch beaver
- Aparna Nancherla as Nisha, Dr. Sam's astute colleague who later uses a Rabbit Hopper
- Tom Law as Tom Lizard, a lizard who prefers to avoid drama
- Sam Richardson as Conner, a graduate student working under Dr. Sam who uses a Heron Hopper twice
- Melissa Villaseñor as Ellen, a big, menacing, mostly grumpy brown bear always on the lookout for her next meal
- Isiah Whitlock Jr. as Bird King, a goose monarch
- Steve Purcell as Amphibian King, a frog monarch
- Ego Nwodim as Fish Queen, a fish monarch
- Nichole Sakura as Reptile Queens, a trio of snake sister co-monarchs
- Meryl Streep as Insect Queen, a villainess butterfly monarch who is the most respected and feared member of the all-seeing and all-powerful Animal Council and the mother of Titus
- Karen Huie as Grandma Tanaka, Mabel's deceased grandmother, who taught her to respect nature and listen to the sounds of the forest when she was young
- Vanessa Bayer as Diane, a fearsome yet friendly great white shark assassin enlisted by the birds
  - Heidi Klum voices Diane (renamed Hai-Di) in the German dub of the film
- Joe Spano as an elderly Beavertonian

The following roles were credited under additional voices:

- Lori Alan as Mrs. Tanaka, Mabel's mother
- Eric Edelstein as a construction worker
- Demetri Martin as a flock of birds and a worm

In the United Kingdom release, Alan Carr and Amanda Holden voices A Squirrel and A Spider, respectively.

== Production ==
=== Development ===
In December 2020, Daniel Chong stated on Twitter that he had returned to Pixar following the completion of his Cartoon Network television series We Bare Bears (2015–2019) and the release of We Bare Bears: The Movie (2020), and that he was developing an original feature film. At the D23 fan event in August 2024, Pixar's chief creative officer Pete Docter announced that the film would be titled Hoppers. Shortly after, Luca writer Jesse Andrews stated on his Twitter account that he had been working on the film for three years. Pixar announced at D23 that Piper Curda, Bobby Moynihan, and Jon Hamm would lead the voice cast for Hoppers. Development on Hoppers lasted for six years.

In an interview with D23, Chong said that one of his inspirations for the film were the nature documentaries in which robot animals are placed in the animal world; "It felt like it was ripe for comedy, this idea of how humans try so hard to fit into the animal world and the weird things that happen through that." He additionally stated, "obviously there are Avatar influences, ... But there's also this Mission Impossible spy-thriller quality to the movie too, because Mabel's kind of infiltrating the animal world." Additionally, Chong has cited Isao Takahata's Pom Poko as a major influence on Hoppers; saying in an interview upon the latter's release, "I think I kind of knew it right away that we needed something like that. What we call it internally with ourselves was it's a two world kind of rule where there's like the human point of view and there's an animal point of view. So we always knew we wanted that. And I think we took a lot of cues from Pom Poko, the movie from Studio Ghibli, which does something similar. Obviously the plot's very different, but the idea that you could showcase two different versions of the animals, and yet the audience understands we're talking about the same animal."

Chong initially pitched the film with penguin protagonists. However, Docter disapproved, arguing that penguins had been protagonists in several other animated films, such as Happy Feet, Penguins of Madagascar, and Wallace & Gromit: Vengeance Most Fowl. Chong changed the protagonists to beavers after doing research on how they affect the environment; "These animals can be these ecosystem engineers and help everyone else survive; I think that just made me go, 'Oh man, beavers are crazy cool.'"

=== Writing ===
In December 2024, The Hollywood Reporter stated that, according to a former Pixar artist, the filmmakers were told to "downplay" the film's "planned message of environmentalism". In a July 2025 interview with Screen Rant, Chong denied experiencing censorship, stating, "If anything, I felt a lot of alignment", adding that "The honest truth about the process, though, is that every movie here goes through so much iteration and changes a lot, and I can see, maybe, to some other people's eyes within the studio, [how] they might see [that] it looks like things are being censored. But, really, [the movie is] just going through its natural course of iteration and stuff – at least for our movie." [modifications in original]

=== Music ===
In August 2025, it was announced that Mark Mothersbaugh would compose the film's score, marking his first composition for a Pixar feature film after composing for the Toy Story Toons short Hawaiian Vacation (2011) and several Cars Toons shorts for the studio. In addition, the film features an original end credits song written and performed by SZA titled "Save the Day", which was released on February 20, 2026.

== Release ==
Hoppers premiered at the El Capitan Theatre in Hollywood, Los Angeles on February 23, 2026, and was screened at the New York International Children's Film Festival on February 28, 2026, which was then followed by a theatrical release in the United States by Walt Disney Studios Motion Pictures on March 6, 2026. Internationally, the film began its rollout two days earlier in certain European and Asian countries, finishing on March 26 in Australia.

=== Marketing ===
Tom Lizard was heavily used in the film's marketing and promotional appearances.

A first-look image of the film was publicly shown at the 2025 Annecy International Animation Film Festival in June 2025. Later that month, a short teaser featuring a small green gecko repeatedly typing the lizard emoji into a phone played in theaters after the end credits of Pixar's Elio. In August 2025, Pixar revealed that the lizard's name is Tom and that he would appear in the film. The character of Tom Lizard quickly went viral, and was the focus of several internet memes, which Disney reported earned up to 316 million views. A mascot of Tom Lizard was used in several appearances surrounding Hoppers, including special screenings, promotional events, and televised appearances in affiliated networks such as "photobombing" ESPN's coverage of Super Bowl LX.

Yogurtland promoted the film with a limited edition sugar-free frozen yogurt flavor known as Mabel's Nutty Adventure.

In the month of the release of the film, the free-to-play kart racing game Disney Speedstorm introduced Mabel as a racer; she was added to the game on March 6 during the mid-season of Season 18: Piston Cup. Likewise, a cosmetics bundle for Fortnite, including a Tom Lizard skin, was released one day earlier.

The city of Beaverton, Oregon declared March 5 "Hoppers Day" in honor of the film's release. Piper Curda and Bobby Moynihan visited the city as part of the film's world tour on March 5, 2026. During the proclamation ceremony, Mayor Lacey Beaty presented the two cast members with a handmade wooden key to the city. In exchange, the actors gifted the city a custom piece of artwork created by Pixar. In addition, Beaty moderated a Q&A between the cast and students from the local school district.

=== Home media ===
Hoppers was released by Disney and Pixar for digital purchase on April 28, 2026. It was subsequently released on Ultra HD Blu-ray, Blu-ray, and DVD by Sony Pictures Home Entertainment (Note: Released under the Disney label.) on June 2, 2026, followed by its streaming debut on Disney+ on June 3, 2026.

On physical media, Hoppers was the fourth best-selling film of June 2026, according to Circana's VideoScan tracking service, which compiles DVD and Blu-ray sales. Nielsen Media Research, which records streaming viewership on certain U.S. television screens, reported that Hoppers was the most-streamed film during the week of June 1–7, with 1.161 billion minutes viewed. During the following week, the film accumulated 663 million minutes viewed, ranking as the second most-streamed film. Between June 15 and 21, Hoppers ranked third with 349 million minutes viewed. During the week of June 22–28, the film placed sixth with 262 million minutes viewed. From June 29 to July 5, Hoppers ranked ninth with 225 million minutes viewed. Overall, from June 1 through July 12, Hoppers was the most-streamed film, with 2.660 billion minutes viewed, according to Nielsen Media Research.

== Reception ==
=== Box office ===
Hoppers grossed $166 million in the United States and Canada and $223.7 million in other territories, for a worldwide total of $389.7 million.

In the United States and Canada, Hoppers was released alongside The Bride!, and was projected to gross $40 million from 4,000 theaters during its opening weekend. The film was projected to reverse Pixar's low opening streak for its originals, overtaking the lukewarm openings of Elemental (2023), which became a sleeper hit, and Elio (2025), which became a box-office failure. The film collected $13.2 million on its opening day, including $3.2 million from Thursday previews, which was seen as ahead of expectations. The film proceeded to open to $46.3 million in the US and Canada and $44.2 million overseas for a worldwide total of $90.6 million, taking first place at the box office. In doing so, Hoppers became the highest opening for an original Pixar film since Coco (2017), and the highest opening for an original animated film in the post-pandemic era. The better-than-average performance was attributed through positive word-of-mouth and the film's release during a slow market for family films.

In its second weekend, the film grossed $28.7 million, remaining in first and dropping 37%. The film dropped another 37% during its third weekend, finishing in second behind newcomer Project Hail Mary, and added $17.8 million. It eased a further 31% and added a further $12.2 million in its fourth. In its fifth weekend, the film finished in fifth place, having dropped behind new release The Drama, and added $5.8 million for a decrease of 52%.

=== Critical response ===
Hoppers received positive reviews, with critics praising its animation, story, and humor. On the review aggregator website Rotten Tomatoes, 94% of 234 critics' reviews are positive, with an average rating of 7.7/10. The website's consensus reads: "An eager beaver for endearment that has the charm to back it up, Hoppers is a sprightly riot that might just be the funniest entry in the Pixar canon yet." Metacritic, which uses a weighted average, assigned the film a score of 73 out of 100, based on 46 critics, indicating "generally favorable" reviews. Audiences polled by CinemaScore gave the film an average grade of "A" on an A+ to F scale.

Several critics called the film a "return to form" for Pixar. Nell Minow from RogerEbert.com gave the film 4 stars out of 4, saying the film is "Pixar at its very best. It has charm and a touch of magic but it is grounded—literally." Wilson Chapman of IndieWire gave it a "B+", stating that "there's not enough time to deepen the sweet friendship between Mabel and George into something as powerful as, say, Marlin and Dory in Finding Nemo (2003). Still, what we do get is pretty uniformly delightful." William Bibbiani of TheWrap felt that "Hoppers isn't just James Cameron's Avatar (2009) if it had feelings, it's also James Cameron's Avatar if it was good."

Owen Gleiberman of Variety lauded the film as "top-drawer Pixar," highlighting its successful blend of a "looney-tunes" sci-fi premise with heartwarming adventure. David Rooney of The Hollywood Reporter gave it a positive review, calling it a "clever, funny, and visually appealing" return to vintage Pixar form that succeeds through its "proudly insane universe" and rambunctious comedic energy. Lindsey Bahr of the Associated Press also gave it a positive review, calling it a "buoyant, freewheeling adventure" that, despite being distant from peak Pixar heights, serves as a "big, joyful leap in the right direction" packed with memorable characters.

Alissa Wilkinson of The New York Times gave the film a mixed review, writing that while it is "not as inventive as Inside Out (2015)" and juggles an overcrowded plot, it ultimately succeeds as a "fable, really, with a science-nerd edge and some charming animal friends." Carlos Morales of IGN also gave it a mixed-to-positive review, describing it as an "entertaining and admirable effort" that suffers from narrative stumbles and world-building flaws but remains anchored by a "madcap energy" and highly likable characters.

Dessi Gomez of Deadline Hollywood gave it a positive review, writing that it "delivers equal parts of laughter and compassion" while praisefully comparing its narrative intersection of technology and nature to The Wild Robot (2024). Katie Walsh of The Seattle Times also gave it a positive review, calling it a "charming" and "action-packed" fable that avoids drifting into sentimentality by leaning into its "weird, wacky and witty" humor without losing its heart.

=== Accolades ===
Accolades received by Hoppers
Award	Date of ceremony	Category	Recipient(s)	Result	Ref.
Gold House	May 9, 2026	Gold100 List	Hoppers, Daniel Chong, and Piper Curda	Included	
Golden Trailer Awards	May 28, 2026	Best Animation/Family	"Party" (Walt Disney Studios and X/AV)	Nominated	
Golden Trailer Awards	May 28, 2026	Best Animation/Family TV Spot	TV: "Crazy (Super Bowl)" (Walt Disney Studios and X/AV)	Won	
Golden Trailer Awards	May 28, 2026	Best Animation TrailerByte for a Feature Film	Digital Spots (The Walt Disney Company and Tiny Hero)	Won	
Hochi Film Awards	December 2026	Best Animated Picture	Hoppers	Pending	
Humanitas Prize	September 9, 2026	Family Feature	Jesse Andrews and Daniel Chong	Nominated	

== Possible sequel ==
In March 2026, during an interview with Espinof, a Spanish film website, director Daniel Chong expressed interest in a potential sequel if the film is successful, saying "I love the idea of a sequel". Later, in June 2026, during an interview with ComingSoon, Chong still expressed interest in a potential sequel alongside producer Nicole Paradis Grindle, saying "All I can say is there's a lot of desire for it to happen from everybody, and we'll see what happens. Pixar is notorious for not making anything if there's no story there. They will scrutinize the hell out of it. We definitely cut a lot of stuff out of the movie because this movie was never short of ideas. There's definitely a lot of material we could pull from for a sequel if we had one". Later, in the same month, during another interview with ComingSoon, voice actors Piper Curda and Bobby Moynihan also expressed interest in a potential sequel, saying "We've talked about it throughout the whole press tour. The adventures of George and Mabel. What could they get into? Where does their story go after this? The idea that Mabel is in the lab with Dr. Sam cooking up other stuff. How does that impact the world or hopping or whatever? I just think there's so much material there. Not only that, but we loved making this movie, and we loved working with each other".
