= Eric Edelstein =

American actor and comedian (born 1977)

- Born: April 23, 1977 (age 49); Patuxent River, Maryland, US
- Education: Gonzaga University
- Occupations: Actor, comedian
- Years active: 2003–present

Eric Edelstein (born April 23, 1977) is an American actor and comedian. He is best known for playing the role of Bobby Mallison in Shameless, B.O.B. in the Monsters vs. Aliens television adaptation, Chad in Clarence, and Grizzly "Grizz" in We Bare Bears.

== Career ==
Edelstein was born in Patuxent River, Maryland. He first took up acting during his senior year at Gonzaga University, where he was studying broadcasting. Around this time, he was working at a local radio station in Spokane. Wanting to pursue acting seriously, he moved to Los Angeles. His first role was as a corrections officer in an episode of Karen Sisco. Edelstein had a recurring role as Lawrence in the first season of Parks and Recreation in 2009.

In 2013, Edelstein voiced B.O.B. in the television adaptation of Monsters vs. Aliens, and that same year voiced Chad in the childrens show Clarence. From 2015 to 2019, he voiced Grizz in the series We Bare Bears, as well as its 2020 movie. He also had a supporting role in the 2015 horror film Green Room, plays a paddock supervisor in Jurassic World, and voiced the character Richard Brynn in the game Before Your Eyes.

When Edelstein appeared as Hank Williams in the series The Boroughs in 2026, he gained traction online when people mistook him for David Harbour.

== Personal life ==
Edelstein is married to actress Jess Rona. He is 6ft 4in.

== Filmography ==
=== Film ===
| Year | Title | Role | Notes |
|---|---|---|---|
| 2007 | The Hills Have Eyes 2 | CPL Gilbert 'Spitter' Cole | |
| 2009 | Hotel for Dogs | ACO Max | |
| 2013 | Welcome to the Jungle | Jared | |
| 2014 | Alexander and the Terrible, Horrible, No Good, Very Bad Day | Mr. Steven Tonucci | |
| 2015 | Green Room | Big Justin | |
| 2015 | Jurassic World | Paddock Supervisor | |
| 2015 | Patchwork | Lloyd | |
| 2016 | The Pickle Recipe | Ted | |
| 2017 | Newness | Angeleno | |
| 2017 | Flower | Dale Dotter | |
| 2017 | Fallen Stars | Bug Man | |
| 2017 | 30-Love | Ref | |
| 2018 | Family | Joe Stone | |
| 2019 | 3 Days with Dad | Zak | |
| 2020 | We Bare Bears: The Movie | Grizzly | Voice |
| 2021 | Ride the Eagle | Officer Mike Nilsons | Voice |
| 2022 | Crush | Announcer 2 | |
| 2026 | Hoppers | Construction worker | Voice cameo |

=== Television ===
| Year | Title | Role | Notes |
|---|---|---|---|
| 2003 | Karen Sisco | Corrections Officer | Episode: "Nostalgia" |
| 2003 | All That | Various | 2 episodes |
| 2004 | Quintuplets | Doorman | Episode: "Boobs on the Run" |
| 2005 | The Comeback | Mike | Episode: "Valerie Shines Under Stress" |
| 2005 | Joey | Special Effects Guy | Episode: "Joey and the Poker" |
| 2007 | Ugly Betty | Ben | Episode: "Punch Out" |
| 2007 | Derek and Simon | Eric | Recurring role |
| 2009 | Parks and Recreation | Lawrence | 3 episodes |
| 2009 | Curb Your Enthusiasm | Stonemason | Episode: "The Black Swan" |
| 2010 | Funny or Die Presents | Construction Worker | 1 episode |
| 2011 | Prime Suspect | Glen Clover | Episode: "Carnivorous Sheep" |
| 2011 | Workaholics | Security Guard | Episode: "Teenage Mutant Ninja Roommates" |
| 2012–2014 | CollegeHumor Originals | Various | Recurring |
| 2012, 2017–present | American Dad! | Various voices | 4 episodes |
| 2012 | Grimm | Oleg Stark | Episode: "Game Ogre" |
| 2012 | Modern Family | Mechanic | Episode: "Planes, Trains and Cars" |
| 2013 | Shameless | Bobby Mallison | 4 episodes |
| 2013 | New Girl | Elvis | Episode: "Chicago" |
| 2013 | Legit | Male Fan | Episode: "Hat Hair" |
| 2013 | The Ben Show | Lou 'Big Lou' | Episode: "Ben Throws a Party" |
| 2013 | Arrested Development | Paramedic | Episode: "Off the Hook" |
| 2013, 2018, 2019 | Drunk History | Museum Guard / L. Ron Hubbard / Guest host (filled in for Derek Waters during the Occupation of Alcatraz segment) | 3 episodes |
| 2013 | Ghost Ghirls | Scott Johniels | Episode: "Spirits of '76: Part 1" |
| 2013 | Key & Peele | Cop | Episode: "Le Mis" |
| 2013–2014 | Monsters vs. Aliens | B.O.B. | Voice, main role |
| 2014 | Party Girls | Luau Dad | Episode: "Happy Birthday, Stellon" |
| 2013–2017 | Clarence | Chad | Voice, recurring role |
| 2014–2021 | Lunchables | Platy | Commercials |
| 2015–2019 | We Bare Bears | Grizzly | Voice, main role |
| 2015 | Chasing Life | Chemo Tech | Episode: "One Day" |
| 2015 | Complications | Jed | Recurring |
| 2015 | Pig Goat Banana Cricket | Timmy | Voice, episode: "Let's Get Tiny" |
| 2015–2017 | Fresh Off the Boat | Jerry | 4 episodes |
| 2015 | Guardians of the Galaxy | Michael Coogan | Voice, episode: "Welcome Back" |
| 2015–2016 | Adam Ruins Everything | Various | 2 episodes |
| 2016 | Brooklyn Nine-Nine | Kurt Ovarp | Episode: "Skyfire Cycle" |
| 2017 | Superior Donuts | Officer Deckerd | 2 episodes |
| 2017 | Love | Devon Monahan | Episode: "The Long D" |
| 2017 | Twin Peaks | Detective 'Smiley' Fusco | 4 episodes |
| 2018 | Hollywood Darlings | Magician | Episode: "White Little Lies" |
| 2018 | The Goldbergs | Mechanic | Episode: "Bachelor Party" |
| 2019 | Rise of the Teenage Mutant Ninja Turtles | Hidden City Police | Voice, episode: "Portal Jacked" |
| 2019 | Room 104 | Swofford | Episode: "The Plot" |
| 2020–2021 | The Fungies! | Coach Croach | Voice, recurring role |
| 2020 | Hoops | Kirk | Voice, recurring role |
| 2020–2025 | Baby Shark's Big Show! | Daddy Shark | Voice, English dub |
| 2021 | Creepshow | Linus | Voice, Episode: "Pipe Screams/Within the Walls of Madness" |
| 2021–2024 | The Ghost and Molly McGee | Geoff | Voice, recurring role |
| 2022 | Bubble Guppies | Daddy Shark | Voice, Episode: "The Jaw-some Sharkventure!" |
| 2024 | The Fairly OddParents: A New Wish | Danky | Voice, Episode: "Stanky Danky" |
| 2025 | The Lowdown | Blackie | 5 episodes |
| 2026 | The Boroughs | Hank Williams | |
| 2026 | Law & Order: Special Victims Unit | Costa Lykos | Episode: "Frequency" |

=== Video games ===
| Year | Title | Role | Notes |
|---|---|---|---|
| 2021 | Before Your Eyes | Richard Brynn | |
