= Patchwork (2015 film) =

- Patchwork Film Poster
- Directed by: Tyler MacIntyre
- Written by: Chris Lee Hill; Tyler MacIntyre
- Produced by: Jason Klein; Jonathan Lonsdale; Ethan Webman; Aaron Webman; John Negropontes
- Starring: Corey Sorenson; Tory Stolper; Tracey Fairaway; Maria Blasucci
- Edited by: Tyler MacIntyre
- Music by: Russ Howard III
- Distributed by: The Orchard
- Release dates: October 17, 2015 (Screamfest Horror Film Festival); June 6, 2017 (United States)
- Running time: 87 minutes
- Country: United States
- Language: English

Patchwork is a 2015 American horror film directed by Tyler MacIntyre, from a screenplay from Chris Lee Hill and MacIntyre. It was shown in film festivals starting in 2015 and officially released in 2017.

== Reception ==
According to Derek Anderson of Daily Dead, the film is "A delightfully dark, Frankenstein-themed horror comedy about a re-animated corpse, made from the stitched together body parts of three murdered young women, that decides to go on a bloody quest to find their killer and avenge their deaths!"

Daniel Kurland of Screen Rant called the film "a cutting commentary on gender dynamics and female empowerment" that "is truer to the source text than the more modern narrative."

== Awards ==
The film received 8 awards including the 2015 Screamfest Awards for Best Editing and Best Picture, and the Toronto After Dark Film Festival awards for Best Actress and Film Most Want to See A Sequel To. It won again in 2016 during its international debuts at the Fantaspoa International Fantastic Film Festival for Best Screenplay and the Nocturna Madrid International Fantastic Film Festival for Best Film.
