= We Bare Bears: The Movie =

2020 film by Daniel Chong

- Digital release film poster
- Directed by: Daniel Chong
- Screenplay by: Christina Chang; Daniel Chong; Alex Chiu; Manny Hernandez; Yvonne Hsuan Ho; Quinne Larsen; Sang Yup Lee; Sooyeon Lee; Charlie Parisi; Eddie Sassen; Sarah Sobole; Louie Zong
- Story by: Mikey Heller; Kris Mukai
- Based on: We Bare Bears by Daniel Chong
- Produced by: Carrie Wilksen
- Starring: Eric Edelstein; Bobby Moynihan; Demetri Martin; Marc Evan Jackson; Keith Ferguson
- Edited by: Tom Browngardt
- Music by: Brad Breeck
- Production companies: Warner Animation Group; Cartoon Network Studios
- Distributed by: Warner Bros. Television Distribution
- Release dates: June 30, 2020 (digital); September 7, 2020 (TV)
- Running time: 70 minutes
- Country: United States
- Language: English

We Bare Bears: The Movie is a 2020 American animated adventure comedy film based on the Cartoon Network television series We Bare Bears. Produced by Cartoon Network Studios and co-written and directed by series creator Daniel Chong, the film stars the voices of series regulars Eric Edelstein, Bobby Moynihan, and Demetri Martin as the three titular bears Grizzly, Panda, and Ice Bear; joined by Marc Evan Jackson as Agent Trout and Keith Ferguson as Officer Murphy. This film serves as the series finale of We Bare Bears.

In their desire to be accepted into the community, Grizzly, Panda, and Ice Bear unwittingly wreak havoc throughout the San Francisco Bay Area, igniting a mob of complaints from its residents. Seeking to remove them from the evil society, wildlife control agent Trout relentlessly pursues to separate the brothers, who in turn escape from the Bay Area and seek refuge in Canada. Along the way, the Bears endure hardships while staying true to their promise of being "bros for life".

The film was released on North American digital theater platforms by Warner Bros. Television Distribution on June 30, 2020, and had its television premiere on Cartoon Network on September 7, 2020. Upon its release, We Bare Bears: The Movie received a positive response from film critics, who praised the film's relevant presentation of its themes, sense of humor, and positive messages. Following the conclusion of the series and the film, a spin-off television series titled We Baby Bears, which follows the Bears as cubs, released on January 1, 2022.

== Plot ==
Grizzly "Grizz", a nomadic bear cub, meets fellow cub Panda for the first time along the train tracks. Stuck as a train rapidly approaches, they are saved by a polar bear cub and the three form a stack as they attempt to outrun it. Upon awakening from this nightmare, a now-adult Grizz drags his brothers Panda and Ice Bear and the three rush out to be the first in line for the opening of a Canadian poutine food truck on the San Francisco Bay Area, unwittingly wreaking havoc along their way which incites the residents being fed up with their antics. Envious of the admiration the newly arrived celebrity koala Nom Nom receives from the public and the hate the Bears receive from them, the three devise a plan to record the "ultimate viral video" using outdated memes and force stream it into every screen in the city, which causes a massive blackout.

The Bears are summoned to the City Hall to explain themselves. Despite the public's demands for their accountability, police officer Murphy refuses to endorse severe punishment, until the evil wildlife control Agent Trout takes over and convinces the assembly to detain the Bears and relocate them to a wildlife reserve. As the Bears' friends appeal for their release, Charlie the Bigfoot and his animal friends hijack a police vehicle and break the Bears out to the forest. With the bears now homeless and pursued, Grizz proposes for them to seek refuge in Canada, despite Panda's reluctance. Disguising the vehicle in hippie graffiti, they barely manage to slip out from Trout's blockade but crash the van in the process. They stumble upon the "Dramatic Cow", a famous talking cow who invites them to a party with various celebrity animals that mistake them for being internet famous. Despite their initial objections, the animals are persuaded by the Bears to spend the night with them, some of whom fix their van. Grizz, frequently haunted by the nightmare of the cubs' train encounter, where Agent Trout captures Panda and Ice Bear, awakes to find out that Trout has tracked them. The animals try to stall the agents as the Bears flee on the van.

As they reach the Canadian border, the Bears are refused entry by the guard for not carrying passports. And, even worse, the van explodes. Angry and frustrated, the Bears argue with each other just as Trout and his men arrive to capture them. Despite Murphy's plea, Panda and Ice Bear are locked in cages to be deported to China and the Arctic, respectively, while Grizz is sent to a preserve center with other captured non-speaking bears. Feeling distraught, upset, and helpless, Grizz is convinced by his younger self to escape by reminding him of the promise he made to his brothers after their initial meeting—that they will always be "bros for life". This empowers him to break free of his enclosure and release the other captive bears, who aid him in liberating Panda and Ice Bear from Trout. Grizz calls out to Trout for doing this to them out of human supremacy and being afraid of what's different.

The preserve's electrified fence ignites a forest fire, trapping all of them inside. Murphy arrives with a helicopter to save them but is prevented by the smoke and flames from reaching down. The Bears induce the other bears to form a tall stack to reach it up but are taken advantage of by Trout. Murphy, having had enough of Trout's cruelty to the bears, shoves a donut in Trout's mouth, handcuffs him to a rail in the helicopter, and lifts the stack up into safety. With their escape from the fire being broadcast by the news, the now-reconciled Bears are celebrated by the public as heroes, while Trout is arrested and taken into custody. Murphy ensures that the brothers will be safely returned home, taking all the other bears with them. Upon arriving back in the city, the Bears are jubilantly received by their friends and are warmly welcomed by the community, who now begin to acclimate themselves with the rest of the bears in various activities for life.

== Voice cast and characters ==
- Eric Edelstein as Grizzly "Grizz", a grizzly bear and the eldest of the Bear brothers. Highly sociable yet socially inept, he among the Bears had the most desire to be accepted and loved by society and cares deeply for the well-being of his younger siblings.
  - Sam Lavagnino as Baby Grizz.
- Bobby Moynihan as Panda, a panda bear and the middle brother. A hopeless romantic, he often changes his online personality to be perceived as a "cool guy".
  - Max Mitchell as Baby Panda.
- Demetri Martin as Ice Bear, a polar bear and the youngest of the Bear brothers. Monotonous and stoic, he always speaks in third person and one-liners and has a variety of skills which prove to be useful in situations.
  - Max Mitchell as Baby Ice Bear.
- Marc Evan Jackson as Agent Trout, an evil wildlife control agent, intent on capturing the Bears and separating them from human society and themselves, who is later defeated and arrested by Officer Murphy.
- Keith Ferguson as Officer Murphy, a kind and dedicated SFPD police officer who has had a few encounters with the bears during the series due to them initially being declared suspects of a crime but later turn out to be innocent. In the film, he is adamant about not punishing the Bears for their antics. Ferguson also voices additional characters in the film.
- Jason Lee as Charlie, a Bigfoot friend of the Bears, who is also a yoga instructor and helped free the bears from Trout after some help from Brenda and his animal friends.
- Patton Oswalt as Nom Nom, an internet sensation koala.
- Lo Mutuc (Note: Credited as Charlyne Yi) as Chloe Park, a collegiate child prodigy and a friend of the Bears.
- Mel Rodriguez as Darrell Saragosa, a friend of the Bears who works at a computer mouse shop.
- Cameron Esposito as Ranger Dana Tabes, a friend of the Bears who works as a park ranger near their home, accompanied by her fellow brave girl scouts, the Poppy Rangers; Marissa Soto as Diaz, Danity Harris as Parker, Stella Balick-Karrer as Murphy, Audrey Huynh as Nguyen, and Cate Gragnani as Wallace.
- Ellie Kemper as Lucy, a friend of the Bears who sells and delivers fresh produce.
- Travina Springer as Dramatic Cow, an internet-famous cow.
- Sarah Sobole as Angry Kitty, an internet-famous cat.
- Josh Cooley as Painting Elephant, an internet-famous elephant.
- Amber Liu as Jojo Raccoon, an internet-famous raccoon.
- Jimmy O. Yang as Joey Raccoon, an internet-famous raccoon and Jojo's brother.
- Fabrizio Guido as Pizza Rat, an internet-famous rat desperate for followers.
- James Trevena-Brown as Jacked Kangaroo, an internet-famous kangaroo.
- Brian Stevenson as Southern Owl, an internet-famous owl.
- Peter Jessop as the Canadian Border Guard
- Erin Fitzgerald as the Canadian poutine truck seller
- Additional Voices: Daniel Chong, Travina Springer, Josh Cooley, Ben Diskin, Keith Ferguson, Erin Fitzgerald, Ace Gibson, Grey Griffin, Manny Hernandez, Maggie Lowe, Edi Patterson, Kevin Michael Richardson, Stephanie Sheh, Rick Zieff

== Production ==
According to We Bare Bears series creator Daniel Chong, he was approached by the Cartoon Network staff with an idea for a feature film based on the series in 2018. Despite having no previous experience in film, Chong accepted the proposal, drawing from his feature animation practice and reasoning that the characters he created have an emotional depth in them and capabilities he knew that could be sustained for a long period of time. Due to the then-continuing production of the series, Chong and his team had to prepare the film while finishing the episodes at the same time, which took over several months. The film's story was written by Mikey Heller and Kris Mukai, the main writers of the series. While writing it, they were inspired by the 2018 California wildfires and the Trump administration family separation policy that were occurring at the time, which lead to a family being separated from each other as a central theme to a forest fire being written in the story's climax. Chong remarked that sensitive topic such as those would not appear to be ideal in the main children's television series. He also wanted the main themes within the series to be displayed in the film, such as diversity and the reason for anthropomorphic characters.

Chong remarked that the original film treatment was centered around the three Bears. But to balance the heavy themes, the film's core was shifted to be centralized around Grizz. The original meeting sequence was first written with the three bears reminiscing it but was rewritten to be focused on Grizz, who, as Chong felt, as the eldest of the brothers, was faced with the heaviest burdens and was most concerned with everyone's well-being. Chong also remarked that he was initially opposed to the addition of the other captive bears, as it could risk the main characters as uninteresting. The film was finalized as the Bears' final adventure and a conclusion to the original We Bare Bears series, though Chong had expressed intentions for it to continue to spin-offs, among other different ways. This was before he announced that he would be departing Cartoon Network to work on another project. The animation on the film was produced by Rough Draft Studios, which had previously animated the television series.

== Music ==
We Bare Bears: The Movie (Original Soundtrack)

Soundtrack album by We Bare Bears
- Released: June 30, 2020
- Length: 4:42
- Labels: Turner Music; Cartoon Network; WaterTower Music
- Producer: Brad Breeck

A soundtrack single for the film was released on June 30, 2020, by Turner Music Publishing, Cartoon Network, and WaterTower Music. Produced by Brad Breeck, it features songs written by Daniel Chong, Estelle Swaray, Ivan Barias, and Louie Zong, including an extended version of the title theme sung by British singer Estelle, the song "On the Road to Canada" sung by the three main characters, and "Place for Me", as sung by Sam Lavagnino as Baby Grizz in the film's opening scene. It does not include the song "Everywhere", a Fleetwood Mac cover sung by German musician Roosevelt in 2019, which was featured in the film's ending credits.

No.	Title	Performer(s)	Length
1.	"We'll Be There (Extended Version)"	Estelle	1:33
2.	"On the Road to Canada"	Eric Edelstein, Bobby Moynihan and Demetri Martin	2:22
3.	"Place for Me"	Sam Lavagnino	0:47
Total length:			4:42

== Themes and interpretations ==
"This movie had to do with my experiences being a minority in America and what that feels like to try and fit in and feel out of place. (To) sometimes worry that people will say this isn't your home."

— Daniel Chong on the film exploring themes of minority discrimination.

We Bare Bears: The Movie, an allegory for what it feels like to be a minority in America, explores themes of acceptance, family separation, and racial discrimination, which were darker than the lighthearted but similar themes upon which Chong, a member of the Asian American minority, had explored within the television series. Pundits and Chong himself stated that both the series and film are allegories for what it feels like to be a minority in America. Chong had previously made the series based from his experiences as an Asian American in Orange County and the San Francisco Bay Area. He remarked, "as an Asian American, sometimes individuals are treated unfairly for no other reason than looking different." Unlike lighthearted manner the series it was based on explored, the film switched to a darker tone by further focusing on the feeling of alienation experienced by the three bears. Due to time limitations of being in 11-minutes long per episode, it was never explicitly presented in the television series, which lead Chong and his team felt will be more aptly and deeply explored within an hour-long feature.

Shamus Kelley of Den of Geek also observed that its theme may also be topical to the Black Lives Matter movement, during which time the film was released, though Chong quickly to dismiss the matter, saying that aren't trying "to echo what's exactly happening right now." He instead attributed the inspirations to what was happening when the film was being developed, including the U.S. Immigration and Customs Enforcement on separation of families, incarceration, and the "pain and intolerance of any minority that is being discriminated against". Mukai felt that those themes had to be addressed, saying "We would all wake up and we would look at the news, and we would say, 'This isn't right.' It would feel sort of disingenuous to not acknowledge it." But also added that she hoped that it made the viewers think about "standing up for people that might not look like them or might be being treated differently from them" and empower children to "feel like they can do something."

Despite wishing to shed more light on these sensitive themes, both Chong and Mukai stated that the film's goal is still to provide relief to their mostly young audience. Chong also noted that the concept of wanting to be understood and accepted should not be hard to understand, that it should be one anyone should be able to understand, regardless of being minority or not. He remarked, "This is not a matter of politics. We all have this primal urge to be understood and accepted. If we just understand that we're all in the same boat, regardless, then my hope is that it will help people understand the idea that we shouldn't be putting up these walls."

== Release ==
Cartoon Network announced the film on May 30, 2019, after the conclusion of the series' fourth season finale and final episode, alongside a then-untitled spin-off series We Baby Bears, which focuses on the Bears as cubs. In January 2020, a short preview of the film was shown during the 2020 SF Sketchfest. On May 21, 2020, the film's trailer was presented by the series' lead voice actors Eric Edelstein, Bobby Moynihan, and Demetri Martin through a Zoom conference. Originally scheduled to be released by Warner Bros. Home Entertainment on June 8, 2020, We Bare Bears: The Movie was released in select North American digital viewing platforms on June 30, 2020 (Amazon Prime Video had accidentally released the movie on the original date before pulling it until the intended date shortly after), and premiered on Cartoon Network on September 7, 2020. The DVD was released on September 8, 2020. Bonus features includes an audio commentary, animatics, deleted scenes and more. When the film released on Cartoon Network, it was watched by 458,000 viewers.

In Southeast Asia, the film was released on Cartoon Network on September 12, 2020 and it was simulcast on Boomerang, Oh!K, Warner TV, HBO, and HBO Family.

== Reception ==
Covering the film for SF Weekly, Grace Li summarized the film as "sweet and fun" and a perfect summation for four seasons of adventures. Though expressing regret over the series' unresolved story lines, she complimented its zany sense of humor and its ultimate message, which to her was that "you can always choose your family". Shamus Kelley of Den of Geek gave the film a five out-of five star rating and praised it as an excellent film; one that feels relevant without losing the fun that made the show a fan favorite. Commending the relationship of its main characters, whose fight against intolerance he said infuses every moment of the film with more power and relevance than any other story the show has done before. Rollin Bishop of ComicBook.com awarded the film a four out of five-star rating. Though describing it as poorly paced, he praised its decision to include the heavy themes, which were exacerbated by current events.
