= Daniel Chong =

American filmmaker

- Born: Fargo, North Dakota, U.S.
- Occupations: Animator; storyboard artist; writer; director; producer
- Years active: 2008–present
- Employers: Walt Disney Animation Studios (2008–present); Illumination (2009–present); Pixar Animation Studios (2011–14, 2020–present); Cartoon Network Studios (2015–20, 2022–present)
- Known for: We Bare Bears; Hoppers

Daniel Chong is an American animator, storyboard artist, writer, director, and producer. He is best known as the creator of Cartoon Network's television series We Bare Bears (2015–2019), and as the director, writer, and executive producer of We Bare Bears: The Movie (2020). He has worked as a member of Pixar's senior creative team and wrote and directed Hoppers (2026).

== Career ==
Chong began his career as an intern for Cartoon Network Studios, and went on to work as a storyboard artist for numerous animation studios, including Walt Disney Animation Studios, Illumination Entertainment, and Pixar Animation Studios. He worked as a storyboard artist on the animated films Bolt (2008), Cars 2 (2011), Dr. Seuss' The Lorax (2012), Free Birds (2013), and Inside Out (2015).

While working at Pixar, Chong worked on the television specials Toy Story of Terror! (2013) and Toy Story That Time Forgot (2014), the former of which won him an Annie Award.

Chong went on to create the animated series We Bare Bears, which premiered on Cartoon Network in 2015. The initial idea for We Bare Bears came from a webcomic that he had created in 2010 called The Three Bare Bears. The webcomic ended almost a year later, but he carried the idea with him. Chong has cited Seinfeld, Broad City, Peanuts, Aardman Animations and Wes Anderson as inspirations for the style and tone of the show. Chong directed, wrote, and executive produced a film adaptation of the series, We Bare Bears: The Movie, which was released in June 2020, thus ending the series. A spinoff series titled We Baby Bears premiered in 2022; Chong serves as executive producer.

In December 2020, Chong revealed on Twitter that he had returned to Pixar and was working on a project there. The film was officially revealed as Hoppers in August 2024; it was released on March 6, 2026.

== Filmography ==
=== Film ===
Year	Title	Director	Writer	Executive Producer	Story Artist	Pixar Senior Creative Team
2008	Bolt	No	No	No	Yes	No
2011	Cars 2	No	No	No	Yes	No
2012	Dr. Seuss' The Lorax	No	No	No	Yes	No
2013	Free Birds	No	No	No	Additional	No
2015	Inside Out	No	No	No	Yes	No
2020	We Bare Bears: The Movie	Yes	Yes	Yes	Yes	No
2022	Turning Red	No	No	No	No	Yes
2022	Lightyear	No	No	No	No	Yes
2023	Elemental	No	No	No	No	Yes
2024	Inside Out 2	No	No	No	No	Yes
2025	Elio	No	No	No	No	Yes
2026	Hoppers	Yes	Story	No	No	Yes
2026	Toy Story 5	No	No	No	No	Yes
2028	Incredibles 3 †	No	No	No	No	Yes

=== Television ===
Year	Title	Creator	Writer	Executive Producer	Story Artist	Notes
2010–2011	Cars Toon: Mater's Tall Tales	No	Story	No	No	Short films: "Moon Mater", "Mater Private Eye", "Air Mater"
2013	Toy Story of Terror!	No	No	No	Yes	TV specials
2014	Toy Story That Time Forgot	No	No	No	Yes	TV specials
2015–2019	We Bare Bears	Yes	Yes	Yes	Yes	140 episodes
2022–present	We Baby Bears	No	No	Yes	No	63 episodes

== Awards and nominations ==
Year	Association	Category	Work	Result
2014	Annie Awards	Outstanding Achievement in Storyboarding in an Animated TV/Broadcast Production	Toy Story of Terror	Won
2016	BAFTA Children's Awards	Best International	We Bare Bears	Won
2018	Primetime Emmy Awards	Outstanding Short Form Animated Program	We Bare Bears	Nominated
