= List of animated short films of the 2010s =

Films are sorted by year and then alphabetically. They include theatrical, television, and direct-to-video films with less than 40 minutes runtime. For a list of films with over 40 minutes of runtime, see List of animated feature films of the 2010s.

== 2010 ==
Name	Country	Technique
Banana	United States	Computer Animation
The Cow Who Wanted to Be a Hamburger	United States	Traditional Animation
Coyote Falls	United States	Computer Animation
Day & Night	United States	Traditional/computer
DC Showcase: Jonah Hex	United States	Traditional
Don't Go	Turkey	Live-action/computer
Donkey's Caroling Christmas-tacular	United States	Computer Animation
Dot	United Kingdom	Stop-motion Animation
The Eagleman Stag	United Kingdom	Stop-motion Animation
Flawed	Canada	Live-action/traditional
Fur of Flying	United States	Computer Animation
Heavy Metal Mater	United States	Computer Animation
Higglety Pigglety Pop! or There Must Be More to Life	Canada	Live-action/puppet
Home Makeover	United States	Computer Animation
I Was a Child of Holocaust Survivors	Canada	Traditional Animation
Kung Fu Panda Holiday	United States	Computer Animation
Legend of the Boneknapper Dragon	United States	Computer Animation
Lego Star Wars: Bombad Bounty	United States	Computer Animation
Let's Pollute	United States	Traditional Animation
Lipsett Diaries	Canada	Hand-Painted Animation
The Lost Thing	Australia, United Kingdom	Computer Animation
Madagascar, a Journey Diary	France	Traditional Animation
Marvel Super Heroes 4D	United States, United Kingdom	Computer Animation
Mater Private Eye	United States	Computer Animation
Matter Fisher	United Kingdom	Traditional Animation
Monster Truck Mater	United States	Computer Animation
Moon Mater	United States	Computer Animation
Mother of Many	United Kingdom	Cutout Animation
Orientation Day	United States	Computer Animation
Pandane to Tamago Hime	Japan	Anime
Prep & Landing: Operation: Secret Santa	United States	Computer Animation
Rabid Rider	United States	Computer Animation
Scared Shrekless	United States	Computer Animation
A Sumo Wrestler's Tail	Japan	Anime
Scrat's Continental Crack-Up	United States	Computer Animation
Thursday	United Kingdom	Flash Animation
Tick Tock Tale	United States	Computer Animation

== 2011 ==
Name	Country	Technique
Abuelas	United Kingdom	Live-action/computer
Adam and Dog	United States	Traditional/computer
Air Mater	United States	Computer Animation
The Ballad of Nessie	United States	Traditional Animation
Bobby Yeah	United Kingdom	Stop-motion Animation
Book of Dragons	United States	Computer Animation
Choke	Canada	Traditional Animation
Electroshock	France	Computer Animation
An Elf's Story: The Elf on the Shelf	United States	Computer Animation
The Fantastic Flying Books of Mr. Morris Lessmore	United States	Computer Animation
Fly	United Kingdom	Computer Animation
Gift of the Night Fury	United States	Computer Animation
The Gruffalo's Child	United Kingdom	Computer Animation
Gulp	United Kingdom	Stop-motion Animation
Happiness Is a Warm Blanket, Charlie Brown	United States	Traditional Animation
Hawaiian Vacation	United States	Computer Animation
I Tawt I Taw a Puddy Tat	United States	Computer Animation
I'm Fine Thanks	Ireland, United Kingdom	Flash Animation
Ice Age: A Mammoth Christmas	United States	Computer Animation
Kung Fu Panda: Secrets of the Masters	United States	Computer Animation
La Luna	United States	Computer Animation
The Last Belle	United Kingdom	Traditional Animation
Lego Star Wars: The Padawan Menace	United States	Computer Animation
The Making of Longbird	United Kingdom	Live-action/cutout
Megamind: The Button of Doom	United States	Computer Animation
A Morning Stroll	United Kingdom	Computer/Flash
My Last Day	Japan	Anime
Night of the Living Carrots	United States	Computer Animation
Osman	Turkey	Flash Animation
The Pig Who Cried Werewolf	United States	Computer Animation
Pixie Hollow Games	United States	Computer Animation
Prep & Landing: Naughty vs. Nice	United States	Computer Animation
Pythagasaurus	United Kingdom	Computer Animation
Scrat's Continental Crack-Up: Part 2	United States	Computer Animation
Small Fry	United States	Computer Animation
The Smurfs: A Christmas Carol	United States	Traditional/Computer
Sunday (Dimanche)	Canada	Traditional Animation
Thriller Night	United States	Computer Animation
Wild Life	Canada	Hand-Painted Animation

== 2012 ==
Name	Country	Technique
Color of Love	Iran	Computer Animation
Feral	United States	Traditional Animation
Flawless Life	Turkey	Computer Animation
Fresh Guacamole	United States	Stop-motion Animation
Goodnight Mr. Foot	United States	Traditional Animation
Head over Heels	United Kingdom	Stop-motion Animation
Here to Fall	Ireland, United Kingdom	Traditional Animation
I Am Tom Moody	United Kingdom	Stop-motion Animation
I, Pet Goat II	Canada	Computer Animation
Jubilee Bunt-a-thon	United Kingdom	Stop-motion Animation
Kali the Little Vampire	Canada, France, Portugal, Switzerland	Traditional Animation
The Legend of Mor'du	United States	Computer Animation
Lego Star Wars: The Empire Strikes Out	United States	Computer Animation
The Lego Story	Denmark	Computer Animation
The Longest Daycare	United States	Traditional Animation
Paperman	United States	Traditional/computer
Partysaurus Rex	United States	Computer Animation
Puss in Boots: The Three Diablos	United States	Computer Animation
Room on the Broom	Germany, United Kingdom	Computer/stop-motion
Scared of Nuclear Plant	Turkey	Traditional Animation
Scooby-Doo! Haunted Holidays	United States	Traditional Animation
Scooby-Doo! Spooky Games	United States	Traditional Animation
Scrat's Continental Crack-Up	United States	Computer Animation
The Snowman and the Snowdog	United Kingdom	Traditional Animation
Tangled Ever After	United States	Computer Animation
Time Travel Mater	United States	Computer Animation

== 2013 ==
Name	Country	Technique
Backward Run	Turkey	Traditional Animation
The Blue Umbrella	United States	Computer Animation
A Boy and His Atom	United States	Stop-motion Animation
Earl Scouts	United States	Computer Animation
The End of Pinky	Canada	Cutout/stop-motion
Everything I Can See From Here	United Kingdom	Flash Animation
Get a Horse!	United States	Traditional/computer
Gloria Victoria	Canada	Traditional Animation
İrfan in University	Turkey	Traditional Animation
Kick-Heart	Japan	Anime
Lego Marvel Super Heroes: Maximum Overload	United States	Computer Animation
Little Witch Academia	Japan	Anime
Madly Madagascar	United States	Computer Animation
Mr Hublot	France, Luxembourg	Computer Animation
Panic in the Mailroom	United States	Computer Animation
Party Central	United States	Computer Animation
Pixie Hollow Bake Off	United States	Computer Animation
Possessions	Japan	Anime
Puppy	United States	Computer Animation
Rob ’n’ Ron	Denmark	Computer Animation
The Scarecrow	United States	Computer Animation
Scooby-Doo! and the Spooky Scarecrow	United States	Traditional Animation
Scooby-Doo! Mecha Mutt Menace	United States	Traditional Animation
Sidewalk	Canada	Traditional Animation
Sleeping with the Fishes	United Kingdom	Traditional Animation
The Smurfs: The Legend of Smurfy Hollow	United States	Traditional/Computer
Spy Fox	United States	Computer Animation
Subconscious Password	Canada	Computer Animation
Super Manny	United States	Computer Animation
Toy Story of Terror!	United States	Computer Animation
Training Wheels	United States	Computer Animation
Umbrellacorn	United States	Traditional Animation
Yellow Sticky Notes | Canadian Anijam	Canada	Traditional Animation

== 2014 ==
Name	Country	Technique
Attack of the 50-Foot Gummi Bear	United States	Computer Animation
Batman: Strange Days	United States	Traditional Animation
Bear Story	Chile	Computer Animation
Bus Story	Canada	Traditional Animation
The Bigger Picture	United Kingdom	Cutout/puppet
The Dam Keeper	United States	Computer Animation
Dawn of the Dragon Racers	United States	Computer Animation
Desire	United States	Computer Animation
Feast	United States	Traditional/computer
The Fog of Courage	United States	Computer Animation
Lava	United States	Computer Animation
Lego DC Comics: Batman Be-Leaguered	United States	Computer Animation
Me and My Moulton	Canada, Norway	Traditional Animation
Monkey Love Experiments	United Kingdom	Stop-motion Animation
Muko	Italy	Flash Animation
My Dad	United Kingdom	Traditional Animation
Rocky & Bullwinkle	United States	Computer Animation
Sangre de Unicornio	Spain	Traditional Animation
Scooby-Doo! Ghastly Goals	United States	Traditional Animation
A Single Life	Netherlands	Computer Animation
Somewhere Down the Line	Ireland	Traditional Animation
Steve's First Bath	United States	Computer Animation
Symphony No. 42	Hungary	Traditional Animation
Tom and Jerry: Santa's Little Helpers	United States	Flash Animation
Toy Story That Time Forgot	United States	Computer Animation
True Love Story	India	Traditional Animation
Vitaminamulch: Air Spectacular	United States	Computer Animation

== 2015 ==
Name	Country	Technique
Adventures of Malia	India	Traditional Animation
Binky Nelson Unpacified	United States	Computer Animation
Borrowed Time	United States	Computer Animation
Cat Meets Dog	Canada	Traditional Animation
Chamelot	United States	Computer Animation
Competition	United States	Computer Animation
Cosmic Scrat-tastrophe	United States	Computer Animation
Cro Minion	United States	Computer Animation
Edmond	United Kingdom	Stop-motion Animation
Frozen Fever	United States	Computer Animation
If I Was God...	Canada	Stop-motion Animation
Kung Fu Panda: Secrets of the Scroll	United States	Computer Animation
Laqi	Taiwan	Traditional Animation
The Legend of Lucky Pie	China	Traditional Animation
Lego Marvel Super Heroes: Avengers Reassembled	United States	Computer Animation
Lego Scooby-Doo! Knight Time Terror	United States	Computer Animation
Manoman	United Kingdom	Stop-motion Animation
Prologue	United Kingdom	Traditional Animation
Riley's First Date?	United States	Computer Animation
Sanjay's Super Team	United States	Computer Animation
Scooby-Doo! and the Beach Beastie	United States	Traditional Animation
Shaun the Sheep: The Farmer's Llamas	United Kingdom	Stop-motion Animation
Something Between Us	United States	Abstract Animation
Stick Man	United Kingdom	Computer Animation
Tea Time	France	Computer Animation
Tempest	India	Traditional Animation
Typhoon Noruda	Japan	Anime
Voodoo Love Story	Italy	Traditional Animation
We Can't Live Without Cosmos	Russia	Traditional Animation
World of Tomorrow	United States	Traditional Animation

== 2016 ==
Name	Country	Technique
The Alan Dimension	United Kingdom	Traditional/live-action
Blind Vaysha	Canada	Traditional Animation
Cream	United Kingdom	Flash Animation
The Early Hatchling Gets the Worm	United States	Computer Animation
Fox and the Whale	Canada	Computer Animation
Garden Party	France	Computer Animation
Ice Age: The Great Egg-Scapade	United States	Computer Animation
The Lego Movie: 4D – A New Adventure	United States, Denmark	Computer Animation
A Love Story	United Kingdom	Stop-motion Animation
The Master	United States	Computer Animation
Marine Life Interviews	United States	Computer Animation
Mower Minions	United States	Computer Animation
Norman Television	United States	Computer Animation
Once Upon a Line	United States	Flash Animation
Panda Paws	United States	Computer Animation
Pear Cider and Cigarettes	Canada, United Kingdom	Flash Animation
Pearl	United States	Flash Animation
Piper	United States	Computer Animation
Revolting Rhymes	United Kingdom	Computer Animation
Scrat: Spaced Out	United States	Computer Animation
Tough	United Kingdom	Flash Animation
Weenie	United States	Computer Animation

== 2017 ==
Name	Country	Technique
Angela's Christmas	Ireland, Canada	Computer Animation
The Archivist	United States	Computer Animation
Dante's Lunch—A Short Tail	United States	Computer Animation
Dear Basketball	United States	Traditional Animation
Eddie's Life Coach	United States	Computer Animation
Grandpa Walrus	United States	Traditional Animation
Gunter Babysits	United States	Computer Animation
Have Heart	United Kingdom	Computer Animation
The Highway Rat	United Kingdom	Computer Animation
In a Heartbeat	United States	Computer Animation
The Kitten from Lizyukov Street 2	Russia	Computer Animation
Late Afternoon	Ireland	Traditional Animation
Lou	United States	Computer Animation
Love at First Sight	United States	Computer Animation
Made in France	France	Live-action/computer
Mamoon	United Kingdom	Traditional Animation
Mécanique	France	Computer Animation
Miss Fritter's Racing Skoool	United States	Computer Animation
Negative Space	France	Traditional Animation
Once a Hero	China	Traditional Animation
Poles Apart	United Kingdom	Stop-motion Animation
Plush Assassin	United States	Computer Animation
Puppy!	United States	Computer Animation
The Secret Life of Kyle	United States	Computer Animation
Trolls Holiday	United States	Computer Animation
Weekends	United States	Traditional Animation

== 2018 ==
Name	Country	Technique
Animal Behaviour	Canada	Traditional Animation
Auntie Edna	United States	Computer Animation
Bao	United States	Computer Animation
Bilby	United States	Computer Animation
Bird Karma	United States	Traditional Animation
EU and USA	Italy	Flash Animation
Kung Fu Panda: The Emperor's Quest	United States	Computer Animation
#TheLateBatsby	United States	Traditional Animation
Lego Ninjago: Master of the 4th Dimension	Denmark	Computer Animation
Log Boy	United States	Computer Animation
Lost & Found	Australia	Live-action/stop-motion
One Small Step	China, United States	Computer Animation
Panic Attack!	United States	Hand-Drawn/Hand-Painted
Purl	United States	Computer Animation
Sister	United States	Stop-motion Animation
Skin for Skin	Canada	Computer Animation
Spider-Ham: Caught in a Ham	United States	Traditional Animation
Tiffanys	United States	Computer Animation
Yellow is the New Black	United States	Computer Animation
Zog	United Kingdom	Computer Animation

== 2019 ==
Name	Country	Technique
An Eye for an Eye	France	Computer Animation
Ecosystem	Italy	Flash Animation
The Doll's Breath	United Kingdom	Stop-Motion Animation
Float	United States	Computer Animation
Hadidance	United States	Computer Animation
Hair Love	United States	Flash Animation
How to Train Your Dragon: Homecoming	United States	Computer Animation
Kitbull	United States	Traditional Animation
Lego City 4D - Officer in Pursuit	Denmark	Computer Animation
Minion Scouts	United States	Computer Animation
Santa's Little Helpers	United States	Computer Animation
Smash and Grab	United States	Computer Animation
The Snail and the Whale	United Kingdom	Computer Animation
Super Gidget	United States	Computer Animation
The Tiger Who Came to Tea	United Kingdom	Traditional Animation
Uncle Thomas: Accounting for the Days	Canada	Traditional Animation
Wind	United States	Computer Animation
