= Pixar Short Films Collection, Volume 3 =

- DVD cover
- Production companies: Pixar Animation Studios; Walt Disney Pictures
- Distributed by: Walt Disney Studios Home Entertainment
- Release date: November 13, 2018
- Running time: 76 minutes
- Country: United States
- Language: English

Pixar Short Films Collection, Volume 3 is a 2018 DVD and Blu-ray compilation of the Pixar animated short films following the 2007 Pixar Short Films Collection Volume 1 and the 2012 Pixar Short Films Collection Volume 2. It features 13 shorts that were released from 2012 through 2018. Volume 3 was released on November 13, 2018, by Walt Disney Studios Home Entertainment.

== Main shorts ==
No.	Title	Directed by	Written by	Original release date
1	Partysaurus Rex	Mark Walsh	Mark Walsh	September 14, 2012
2	The Legend of Mor'du	Brian Larsen	Steve Purcell and Brian Larsen	November 13, 2012
3	The Blue Umbrella	Saschka Unseld	Saschka Unseld	February 12, 2013
4	Party Central	Kelsey Mann	Kelsey Mann	August 9, 2013
5	The Radiator Springs 500½	Robert Gibbs and Scott Morse (co-director)	TBD	May 20, 2014
6	Lava	James Ford Murphy	James Ford Murphy	June 14, 2014
7	Riley's First Date?	Josh Cooley	Josh Cooley	August 14, 2015
8	Sanjay's Super Team	Sanjay Patel	Sanjay Patel	June 15, 2015
9	Piper	Alan Barillaro	Alan Barillaro	June 17, 2016
10	Marine Life Interviews	Ross Haldane Stevenson	Victoria Strouse, Andrew Stanton and Bob Peterson	October 25, 2016
11	Lou	David Mullins	David Mullins	March 12, 2017
12	Miss Fritter's Racing Skoool	James Ford Murphy	James Ford Murphy	October 24, 2017
13	Bao	Domee Shi	Domee Shi	April 21, 2018
