= Pixar Short Films Collection =

Pixar Short Films Collection may refer to:

- Pixar Short Films Collection, Volume 1
- Pixar Short Films Collection, Volume 2
- Pixar Short Films Collection, Volume 3
