= The Good Dinosaur =

2015 film by Peter Sohn

- Theatrical release poster
- Directed by: Peter Sohn
- Screenplay by: Meg LeFauve
- Story by: Peter Sohn; Erik Benson; Meg LeFauve; Kelsey Mann; Bob Peterson
- Based on: An original concept by Bob Peterson
- Produced by: Denise Ream
- Starring: Raymond Ochoa; Jack Bright; Sam Elliott; Anna Paquin; A. J. Buckley; Steve Zahn; Jeffrey Wright; Frances McDormand
- Cinematography: Mahyar Abousaeedi (camera); Sharon Calahan (lighting)
- Edited by: Stephen Schaffer
- Music by: Mychael Danna; Jeff Danna
- Production company: Pixar Animation Studios
- Distributed by: Walt Disney Studios; Motion Pictures (Note: Distributed under the Walt Disney Pictures banner.)
- Release dates: November 10, 2015 (Paris); November 25, 2015 (United States)
- Running time: 94 minutes
- Country: United States
- Language: English
- Budget: $175–200 million
- Box office: $342.5 million

The Good Dinosaur is a 2015 American animated adventure film directed by Peter Sohn and written by Meg LeFauve. Produced by Pixar Animation Studios for Walt Disney Pictures, It stars the voices of Raymond Ochoa, Jack Bright, Steve Zahn, Sam Elliott, Anna Paquin, A. J. Buckley, Jeffrey Wright, and Frances McDormand. The film explores an alternate history where non-avian dinosaurs never became extinct, following a young, timid Apatosaurus named Arlo (Ochoa) living on a farm with his family, who meets an unlikely human friend named Spot (Bright) while traveling through a dangerous and mysterious landscape in order to return home, after being washed downriver.

Development of The Good Dinosaur began with Bob Peterson and Sohn working on the film in 2009, when the former came up with the idea of exploring what dinosaurs represent in the present day and how they are represented in stereotypes. The project was officially announced in 2011, with the release date, plot, director and co-director, producer, and other small details being revealed. During its production, the team encountered various problems, which led to multiple story revisions, as well as changing directors and voice cast. To create a realistic background for the film, the team traveled to various American landscapes, which were later incorporated into the film. Arlo is designed to look distinct and relatable, in order to connect with audiences. In addition, the film pays homage to the Western genre in its themes, character representation, and western North American landscapes. Mychael and Jeff Danna composed the film's musical score, marking Pixar's first film to be scored by two composers.

The Good Dinosaur premiered on November 10, 2015, in Paris, and was released in the United States on November 25 in the Disney Digital 3-D and RealD 3D formats, marking the first time where two Pixar films were released in the same year, following the release of Inside Out earlier that year. The film received generally positive reviews from critics for its animation and themes, though its storytelling was not considered to be up to Pixar's standards. It was considered to be Pixar's first box office under-performer by multiple analysts, grossing $342.5 million on a $175–200 million budget, with sources estimating the film to have lost the studio as much as $85 million. The film received a nomination for Best Animated Feature Film at the 73rd Golden Globe Awards.

== Plot ==
In an alternate history, the asteroid that would have caused the Cretaceous–Paleogene extinction event passes harmlessly by the Earth, resulting in many animals surviving, including Dinosaurs. Millions of years later, Apatosaurus farmers Henry and Ida have three children: Libby, Buck, and Arlo. While his siblings successfully complete hard tasks and are allowed to "make their mark" (a mud-print) on the family's corn silo, Arlo struggles due to his weaker physique and timid nature. Hoping to boost Arlo's confidence, Henry tasks Arlo with guarding the silo from thieving creatures, and watching the "critter trap" set nearby. The trap captures a feral child, but Arlo cannot bring himself to kill him and sets him free. Frustrated, Henry orders Arlo to follow him into a ravine to track the caveboy down, but they turn back home when a severe thunderstorm begins. Henry saves Arlo's life from a flash flood, but is killed by debris.

Without his father, Arlo shoulders more of the workload. He spots the same caveboy robbing the silo; blaming the caveboy for Henry's death, Arlo chases him into the river, and both of them are washed miles downstream. Arlo is knocked unconscious, and awakens to find himself far from home with the caveboy, who ignores Arlo's initial annoyance and tries to bring him food. Arlo warms up to the caveboy after he saves him from a vicious snake-like creature; this feat impresses Forrest Woodbush, an eccentric Styracosaurus who decides he wants the caveboy for a pet. He forces Arlo to compete with him to give the boy a name he will respond to, and Arlo wins the game when he calls the boy "Spot". Arlo and Spot bond as they follow the riverbank back towards the farm. One night, Arlo laments his lost family, and Spot reveals that his own parents are both dead.

Later, when a storm strikes, Arlo suffers a panic attack and flees into the wilderness, losing track of the riverbank. The next morning, Arlo and Spot are noticed by a band of viciously carnivorous pterodactyls, who attack Arlo and attempt to eat Spot. Fleeing the pterodactyls, Arlo and Spot encounter Tyrannosaurus siblings Nash and Ramsey, who drive off the predators.

Nash, Ramsey and their father Butch are in the middle of a cattle drive, but have lost their herd of Bison Latifrons longhorns. Arlo suggests they make use of Spot's tracking skills; Spot successfully locates the longhorns, but Butch senses the presence of cattle rustlers. Arlo and Spot lure the four rustler Dromaeosaurids into the open, allowing Butch and his family to attack and drive them away. Arlo saves Butch's life during the battle; after sharing stories around a campfire, the Tyrannosaurs allow Arlo and Spot to travel with them. Once Arlo spots his home mountains in the distance, he and Spot thank Butch's family and separate from them. They later notice an adult feral caveman in the distance; Spot is intrigued, but Arlo insists they continue on.

As another storm approaches, the pterodactyls reappear, attack Spot, and carry him away. Arlo attempts to intervene, but is pushed off a cliff by one of the pterodactyls and gets entangled in vines. While semi-conscious, Arlo has a vision of Henry, who affirms that Arlo has become braver and encourages him to go after Spot. Arlo frees himself, runs through the storm until he catches up to the pterodactyls, and, with Spot's help, he fights them off and sends them floating down a river. Spot is also knocked into the river, just as a landslide triggers a megatsunami. Arlo leaps into the water to shield Spot, and the two are washed over a waterfall. Arlo drags himself and Spot to the shore, where they rest before continuing on.

As they approach Arlo's home, the caveman returns with his wife and children. They and Spot show great interest in one another, so Arlo reluctantly encourages Spot to go with this new family instead of staying with him. The two share a heartfelt goodbye, and Arlo returns home to his overjoyed family, making his mark between those of his father and mother on the silo.

== Voice cast ==
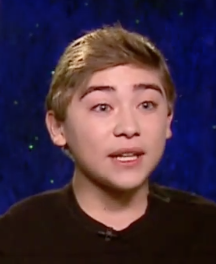
Raymond Ochoa (pictured in 2015) voices Arlo

- Raymond Ochoa as Arlo, a 10-year-old Apatosaurus
  - Jack McGraw as Young Arlo
- Jack Bright as Spot, a 7-year-old human caveboy who befriends Arlo
- Sam Elliott as Butch, a Tyrannosaurus who runs a "ranch" filled with prehistoric "longhorns"
- Anna Paquin as Ramsey, Butch's daughter
- A. J. Buckley as Nash, Butch's son
- Jeffrey Wright as Poppa Henry, the father of the Apatosaurus family
- Frances McDormand as Momma Ida, the mother of the Apatosaurus family
- Marcus Scribner as Buck, Arlo's bullying older brother
  - Ryan Teeple as Young Buck
- Maleah Padilla as Libby, Arlo's older sister
- Steve Zahn as Thunderclap, the leader of a gang of pterodactyls
- Peter Sohn as Forrest Woodbush, a Styracosaurus who has various animals perched on his horns
- Dave Boat as Bubbha, the leader of a gang of Dromaeosaurid rustlers
- Mandy Freund as Downpour, from Thunderclap's flock
- Steven Clay Hunter as Coldfront, from Thunderclap's flock
- Carrie Paff as Lurleane, a Dromaeosaurid who is a member of Bubbha's pack
- John Ratzenberger as Earl, a Dromaeosaurid who is a member of Bubbha's pack
- Calum Mackenzie Grant as Pervis, a Dromaeosaurid who is a member of Bubbha's pack

== Production ==
=== Development ===
In 2009, Bob Peterson came up with the idea of exploring how dinosaurs are represented in the modern day. Soon afterwards, Peterson and Peter Sohn began working on the film. On June 20, 2011, Disney announced that an untitled Pixar animated film would be released on November 27, 2013.

The project was referred to as The Untitled Pixar Movie About Dinosaurs at the D23 Expo on August 21, 2011, which revealed the plot, director and co-director, producer, and other small details. On April 24, 2012, Pixar officially revealed the film's title as The Good Dinosaur.

Peterson stated: "It's time to do a movie where you get to know the dinosaur, what it's really like to be a dinosaur and to be with a dinosaur." He said that his inspiration for the film came from a childhood visit to the World's Fair where he was impressed by "dinosaur animatronics." Sohn described the film's title as "deceptively simple", which "has more meaning than it seems". He additionally explained: "Arlo has a lot of issues when he's born. He's fearful and he's weak and he's disconnected from the family because of these issues and he feels like he's not worthy, and so he finds a way to become worthy."

In April 2012, Pixar announced that the film's release date had been shifted from November 27, 2013, to May 30, 2014, with Walt Disney Animation Studios' Frozen taking its place. On August 9, 2013, it was announced at the D23 Expo that Lucas Neff, John Lithgow, Frances McDormand, Neil Patrick Harris, Judy Greer, and Bill Hader had joined the cast of the film.

=== Revisions ===
By mid 2013, Peterson had been removed from the film due to story problems, and he could not solve in the films' third act. Peterson was absent from the D23 Expo where Sohn and producer Denise Ream presented footage from the film. Peterson moved on to another project he developed at Pixar while Ream replaced producer John Walker, who left to work on Disney's own Tomorrowland. John Lasseter, Lee Unkrich, Mark Andrews, and Sohn stepped in temporarily to work on various sections of the film. In September 2013, The Good Dinosaur was pushed back from May 30, 2014 (the originally scheduled release date for Inside Out which was eventually moved to 2015), to November 25, 2015 (the scheduled release date for Pixar's Finding Dory). According to Ream, the primary reason for the rescheduling was because "the story was not working, period, full stop, it just was not where it needed to be." In November 2013, due to the delay, Pixar laid off 67 employees of its 1,200-person workforce, following the closure of Pixar Canada a month before, when about 80 employees had been laid off, officially to refocus Pixar's efforts at its main headquarters. In a 2020 interview, Peterson stated that he faced difficulty because he "tried to write and direct at the same time", and additionally said: "Basically, we had a good first act, our second act didn't progress emotionally like we wanted it and our third act was missing in action. For me it was just a matter of running out of time and Pixar deciding that it wasn't the story that they wanted to tell."

In August 2014, Lithgow revealed in an interview that the film had been dismantled and "completely reimagined" and that he was expected to rerecord his role in the next month while mentioning that McDormand was still part of the film. In October 2014, Sohn was announced as the new director of the film. In November 2014, it was reported that new elements had been added to the story, such as treating nature as the film's antagonist.

In June 2015, it was announced that the majority of the cast had been revised. Of the original cast, only McDormand retained her role in the film. It was revealed that Neff had been replaced by Raymond Ochoa, and Lithgow had been replaced by Jeffrey Wright. Arlo's three siblings, to be voiced by Harris, Hader, and Greer had been cut down to a single brother named Buck, voiced by Marcus Scribner, and later, a sister named Libby, voiced by Maleah Padilla. It was also confirmed that the farmer aspect was still part of the film.

=== Design and setting ===
The nature of the film was designed to make itself the main antagonist for Arlo.

The filmmakers wanted nature to be the antagonist for the main character Arlo. Ream noted "Nature can overcome anything, including a massive dinosaur." In order to achieve the needed realism, the film's team traveled to the American Northwest, spending time in Jackson Hole, Wyoming, Juntura, Oregon, and southern Montana. Production designer Harley Jessup stated that the film "has a fantastic variety of landscapes," which ranged "from the Jackson Valley and the Tetons to the amazing geysers and waterfalls in Yellowstone," as the filmmakers "studied the grasslands of Montana and the Red Desert" and used them to incorporate into the film. To use the landscapes that they had experienced, the filmmakers used data from the U.S. Geological Survey, and satellite images from Google Earth. The geographical data provided a foundation that the team then built on. According to supervising technical director Sanjay Bakshi, this gave Sohn "the freedom to shoot in any direction he wanted to make the world feel big and real." In addition, The Good Dinosaur features three-dimensional, volumetric clouds. In previous Pixar films, clouds have been "painted" onto the sets. Lighting cinematographer Sharon Calahan described the storm clouds "are almost like a villain in the film", and appeared "in almost every scene." Calahan also noted "These particular clouds can be rendered and we can light them, which we've never been able to properly do before."

According to the filmmakers, the environments and landscapes in the film are not photo-realistic, they are just detailed in a way that advanced technology and style decisions allow. In terms of animating Arlo, directing animator Rob Duquette Thompson and animation character developer Kevin O'Hara went to a zoo and shot video of elephants in motion. A system where Arlo's head goes up and his chest goes down when his hips goes up, was therefore created. To get an idea of the scale of Arlo, a complete full-size model was built out of card and foam core. In total The Good Dinosaur took up 300TB of server space, ten times as much space as Monsters University (2013).

Arlo was designed so that the audience could identify with him and be able to see the "boy" inside the dinosaur. Since The Good Dinosaur is set in a world in which dinosaurs never became extinct, they were instead able to evolve. Herbivores like Arlo and his family become farmers, and carnivores like the T. rex become ranchers. Because they are meant to be reminiscent of cowboys, when the T. rex run, their lower bodies mimic a galloping horse, while their upper bodies have the feel of a riding cowboy. To help inspire Butch's physical look and performance, the filmmakers looked at classic film cowboys such as characters portrayed by Clint Eastwood and Jack Palance.

=== Music ===
The film's score was composed by Mychael Danna and his brother, Jeff, replacing Thomas Newman, who was originally attached to score the film when it was set to be directed by Peterson. It marks the first Pixar film to be scored by two composers. Danna was approached by Sohn and Ream due to his score for Life of Pi (2012), which won an Academy Award. Having a lot of work, he invited his brother as a co-writer. Walt Disney Records released the soundtrack on November 20, 2015.

== Release ==
Prior to the film's release on November 19, 2015, The Good Dinosaur: Dino Crossing, a mobile arcade-style game, was released. The game, later also available on Kindle Fire, was no longer available, according to Common Sense Media; while a figure of Spot and Power Discs of Arlo, Ramsey, Nash, and Butch were also released for Disney Infinity 3.0.

The Good Dinosaur was theatrically released on November 25, 2015. Before the rescheduling from 2014 to 2015, a Monsters University short film titled Party Central was set to accompany the film but was instead shown with the theatrical release of Disney's Muppets Most Wanted. In April 2015, it was announced that a new Pixar short, Sanjay's Super Team, directed by Sanjay Patel, would be shown in front of The Good Dinosaur instead. The film received an exclusive run at the Grand Rex in Paris a week before its U.S. and European premiere.

=== Home media ===
Walt Disney Studios Home Entertainment released The Good Dinosaur on Blu-ray, DVD, Blu-ray 3D and digital download on February 23, 2016. Blu-ray bonus features include Sanjay's Super Team, audio commentary, behind-the-scenes featurettes, deleted scenes, and the "Hide and Seek" short promotional clip. In 2019, The Good Dinosaur was released on 4K Ultra HD Blu-ray.

In its first week, The Good Dinosaur sold 686,656 DVDs and 726,042 Blu-rays as the most sold film on both formats in the United States. That same week, The Good Dinosaur topped the Nielsen VideoScan First Alert chart, which tracks overall disc sales, as well as the dedicated Blu-ray sales chart. Overall, The Good Dinosaur sold 1.8 million DVDs and 1.3 million Blu-rays, adding them up to get a total of 3.1 million copies, and made $64.2 million through home media releases. It was the eighth best-selling film of 2016.

== Reception ==
=== Box office ===
The Good Dinosaur grossed $123.1 million in the United States and Canada and $219.4 million in other territories, for a worldwide total of $342.5 million against a production budget of $175–200 million. In January 2016, The Hollywood Reporter estimated the film would lose $85 million against a total production and marketing budget of $350 million and become Pixar's first film not to break even in its theatrical run, with other publications labeling the film a "box-office bomb" or "flop".

Released alongside Creed and Victor Frankenstein, as well as the wide releases of Brooklyn, Spotlight, and Trumbo, on November 25, 2015, The Good Dinosaur made $9.8 million on its first day, including $1.3 million from Wednesday night previews. It went on to take second place over the five-day Thanksgiving weekend behind The Hunger Games: Mockingjay – Part 2 with $56 million from 3,749 theaters. Its second weekend saw the box office drop by 60% to $15.5 million, and The Good Dinosaur grossed another $10.3 million the following weekend. The Good Dinosaur completed its theatrical run in the United States and Canada on April 7, 2016.

Worldwide, The Good Dinosaur made $29.8 million in its opening weekend in 39 markets, including 8 significant countries. Unlike the US, where it had the benefit of the Thanksgiving weekend, it did not have the same benefit internationally. Rather, its release date was designed to set it up to run through Christmas and New Years. The top countries were the United Kingdom ($7.8 million), Mexico ($6.7 million), France ($6 million), Argentina ($3.8 million), and Russia ($3.7 million). Of those, it opened at No. 1 in Mexico, Argentina, and Russia. The film's top international markets were the United Kingdom ($22.5 million), France ($18 million), Japan ($14.9 million), Mexico ($13.2 million), and Brazil ($11.8 million).

=== Critical response ===
On the review aggregator website Rotten Tomatoes, 76% of 219 critics' reviews are positive, with an average rating of 6.6/10. The website's consensus reads: "The Good Dinosaur delivers thrillingly beautiful animation in service of a worthy story that, even if it doesn't quite live up to the lofty standards set by Pixar, still adds up to charming, family-friendly entertainment." Metacritic, which uses a weighted average, assigned the film a score of 66 out of 100, based on 37 critics, indicating "generally favorable" reviews. Audiences polled by CinemaScore gave the film an average grade of "A" on an A+ to F scale.

Kenneth Turan of the Los Angeles Times described it as "antic and unexpected as well as homiletic, rife with subversive elements, wacky critters and some of the most beautiful landscapes ever seen in a computer animated film." Manohla Dargis of The New York Times felt the film "has a few things on its mind, but its tone is overwhelmingly playful, not hectoring." Joe Morgenstern of The Wall Street Journal opined that "As Pixar productions go, this one isn't a groundbreaker, but it's heartfelt and endearing, as well as visually splendiferous, and kids will love it for sure." Justin Chang of Variety wrote "Clever and cloying by turns, it's a movie that always seems to be trying to evolve beyond its conventional trappings, and not succeeding as often as Pixar devotees have come to expect". Many of the reviewers praised the sophistication of its nearly photorealistic backgrounds.

Christopher Orr of The Atlantic felt it to be the studio's first film explicitly targeted towards children, though it is "by no means a bad movie [...] It's a simple story, well-told." Mark Feeney, writing for The Boston Globe, felt similarly, deeming it a "very middling movie [...] The Good Dinosaur generally features a sort of sentimentality and emotional reductiveness that make it seem meant for small children as no previous Pixar movie has." The Washington Post's Stephanie Merry dubbed it "a nice, conventional story, but it's not Pixar-level imaginative." Richard Roeper, for the Chicago Sun-Times, felt it was "one strange, aggressively gross and dark adventure [...] Inconsistent and weird, The Good Dinosaur is second-level Pixar all the way." Michael Rechtshaffen of The Hollywood Reporter panned its "disappointingly derivative" screenplay. Mark Kermode of The Guardian says "But however much it may delight on a scene-by-scene basis, The Good Dinosaur never comes together as a coherent whole, a crucial flaw for a film by Pixar, which has always put story first."

=== Accolades ===
Accolades received by The Good Dinosaur
Award	Date of ceremony	Category	Recipient(s)	Result	Ref.
American Cinema Editors Awards	January 29, 2016	Best Edited Animated Feature Film	Stephen Schaffer	Nominated	
Annie Awards	February 6, 2016	Best Animated Feature	The Good Dinosaur	Nominated	
Annie Awards	February 6, 2016	Outstanding Achievement for Animated Effects in an Animated Production	Jon Reisch and Stephen Marshall	Won	
Annie Awards	February 6, 2016	Outstanding Achievement for Character Animation in a Feature Production	Mark C. Harris	Nominated	
Annie Awards	February 6, 2016	Outstanding Achievement for Character Animation in a Feature Production	K.C. Roeyer	Nominated	
Annie Awards	February 6, 2016	Outstanding Achievement for Character Design in a Feature Production	Matt Nolte	Nominated	
Annie Awards	February 6, 2016	Outstanding Achievement for Music in a Feature Production	Mychael Danna and Jeff Danna	Nominated	
Annie Awards	February 6, 2016	Outstanding Achievement for Production Design in an Animated Feature Production	Harley Jessup, Sharon Calahan, Bryn Imagire, Noah Klocek, and Huy Nguyen	Nominated	
Annie Awards	February 6, 2016	Outstanding Achievement for Storyboarding in a Feature Production	Bill Presing	Nominated	
Annie Awards	February 6, 2016	Outstanding Achievement for Storyboarding in a Feature Production	Rosana Sullivan	Nominated	
Annie Awards	February 6, 2016	Outstanding Achievement for Storyboarding in a Feature Production	J.P. Vine, Tony Rosenast, and Enrico Casarosa	Nominated	
Artios Awards	January 21, 2016	Animation	Natalie Lyon and Kevin Reher	Nominated	
Black Reel Awards	February 18, 2016	Best Voice Performance	Jeffrey Wright	Nominated	
British Academy Children's Awards	November 20, 2016	Kid's Vote — Film	The Good Dinosaur	Nominated	
British Academy Children's Awards	November 20, 2016	Feature Film	The Good Dinosaur	Nominated	
Chicago Film Critics Association Awards	December 16, 2015	Best Animated Film	The Good Dinosaur	Nominated	
Cinema Audio Society Awards	February 20, 2016	Outstanding Achievement in Sound Mixing in a Motion Picture – Animated	Vince Caro, Tom Johnson, Michael Semanick, Brad Haehnel, and Kyle Rochlin	Nominated	
Critics' Choice Movie Awards	January 17, 2016	Best Animated Feature	The Good Dinosaur	Nominated	
Florida Film Critics Circle Awards	December 23, 2015	Best Animated Film	The Good Dinosaur	Nominated	
Georgia Film Critics Association Awards	January 8, 2016	Best Animated Film	The Good Dinosaur	Nominated	
Golden Globe Awards	January 10, 2016	Best Animated Feature Film	The Good Dinosaur	Nominated	
Golden Reel Awards	February 27, 2016	Outstanding Achievement in Sound Editing – Sound Effects, Foley, Dialogue and ADR for Animated Feature Film	Shannon Mills	Nominated	
Houston Film Critics Society Awards	January 9, 2016	Best Animated Film	The Good Dinosaur	Nominated	
Movieguide Awards	February 5, 2016	Best Movies for Families	The Good Dinosaur	Nominated	
NAACP Image Awards	February 5, 2016	Outstanding Character Voice Performance – Motion Picture	Jeffrey Wright	Nominated	
Online Film Critics Society Awards	December 14, 2015	Best Animated Film	The Good Dinosaur	Nominated	
Producers Guild of America Awards	January 23, 2016	Best Animated Motion Picture	Denise Ream	Nominated	
San Diego Film Critics Society Awards	December 14, 2015	Best Animated Film	The Good Dinosaur	Nominated	
Satellite Awards	February 21, 2016	Best Motion Picture, Animated or Mixed Media	The Good Dinosaur	Nominated	
Saturn Awards	June 22, 2016	Best Animated Film	The Good Dinosaur	Nominated	
Village Voice Film Poll	January 7, 2016	Best Animated Film	The Good Dinosaur	10th Place	
Visual Effects Society Awards	February 2, 2016	Outstanding Visual Effects in an Animated Feature	Sanjay Bakshi, Denise Ream, Michael Venturini, and Jon Reisch	Won	
Visual Effects Society Awards	February 2, 2016	Outstanding Animated Performance in an Animated Feature	Ana Gabriela Lacaze, Jacob Brooks, Lou Hamou-Lhadj, and Mark C. Harris for "Spot"	Nominated	
Visual Effects Society Awards	February 2, 2016	Outstanding Created Environment in an Animated Feature	David Munier, Matthew Webb, Matt Kuruc, and Tom Miller for "The Farm"	Won	
Visual Effects Society Awards	February 2, 2016	Outstanding Effects Simulations in an Animated Feature	Stephen Marshall, Magnus Wrenninge, Michael Hall, and Hemagiri Arumugam	Won	

== See also ==
- List of films featuring dinosaurs
