= Pixar (disambiguation) =

Pixar, or Pixar Animation Studios, is an American computer animation studio currently owned by Disney.

Pixar may also refer to:

- Pixar Canada, the former Canadian subsidiary of Pixar Animation Studios
- Pixar Image Computer, a graphics designing computer made by the company that would become Pixar Animation Studios
- Pixar RenderMan, a 3D rendering software produced by Pixar Animation Studios
