= Sanjay Patel =

American animator and illustrator

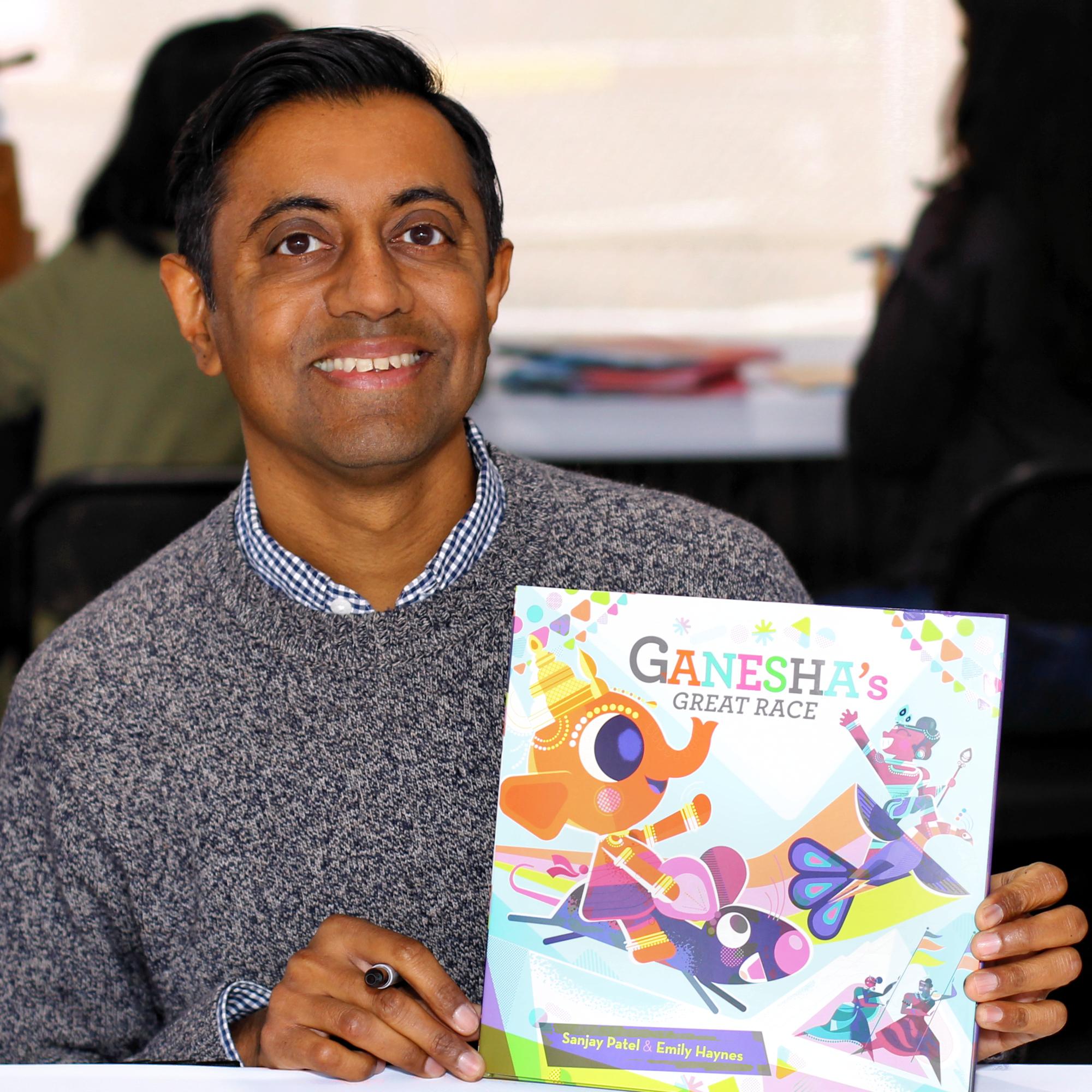
- Patel at the 2023 Texas Book Festival
- Born: 1974 or 1975 (age 51–52); London, United Kingdom
- Occupation: Animator
- Years active: 1996–present

Sanjaykumar "Sanjay" Patel is a British-born American animator, illustrator and author who has worked in the animation department of various projects, most of them animated films released by Pixar.

== Background ==
Born in London, United Kingdom to Gujarati Indian parents, Patel moved to the United States with his family at the age of four. His father bought a motel in San Bernardino, California, where Patel grew up.

== Career ==
Patel is known for directing the short animated film Sanjay's Super Team (2015), which was inspired by his childhood. The film received a nomination in the category of Best Animated Short Film at the 88th Academy Awards and for Best Animated Short Subject at the 43rd Annie Awards.

Since 1996, Patel has worked as an animator on numerous Pixar films such as Monsters, Inc. (2001), Ratatouille (2007), Cars (2006), Monsters University (2013), Toy Story 2 (1999) and The Incredibles (2004) and served as a character developer on the latter two films.

He also authored Ramayana: Divine Loophole, lending a whimsical illustration style and lighthearted voice to the Hindu epic Ramayana.

Patel is the creator of Ghee Happy, an animated series that portrays the Hindu deities Ganesha, Kali, Krishna and Saraswati as children discovering their powers in the titular daycare. The series was picked up by Netflix Animation in 2019, but was later dropped due to leadership changes at the company. In 2023, Ghee Happy was reworked as an online series for YouTube. Books, exhibits, and apparel have been produced for the brand.

In June 2024, it was announced that Patel was developing an animated film with Warner Bros Animation. Titled Bad Karma, the film follows the young demon princess Chandra and the legendary demigod Hanuman on an epic tale about courage, loyalty, and an unlikely friendship.

== Filmography ==
- The Simpsons (TV Series) - Character layout artist (2 episodes)
  - "A Milhouse Divided" (1996)
  - "Grade School Confidential" (1997)
- A Bug 's Life (1998) - Additional character designer, animator
- "I Miss You" (Music Video) (1999) - Animator
- Toy Story 2 (1999) - Story artist, animator
- Monsters, Inc. (2001) - Story artist, animator
- The Incredibles (2004) - Story artist, animator
- Cars (2006) - Animator
- Ratatouille (2007) - Animator
- Your Friend the Rat (2007) - Additional character designer
- Cars Toons (TV Series) - Animator, animation supervisor
  - Rescue Squad Mater (2008) - Animator
  - Tokyo Mater (2008) - Animator
  - Monster Truck Mater (2010) - Animation supervisor
  - Heavy Metal Mater (2010) - Animation supervisor
  - Moon Mater (2010) - Animation supervisor
  - Mater Private Eye (2010) - Animation supervisor
- Toy Story 3 (2010) - Fix, additional animation
- Cars 2 (2011) - Fix, additional animation
- Monsters University (2013) - Character development and animation
- Sanjay's Super Team (2015) - Writer, director
- Incredibles 2 (2018) - Story artist
- Ghee Happy (2023) - Creator, executive producer
