= Kelsey Mann =

American filmmaker

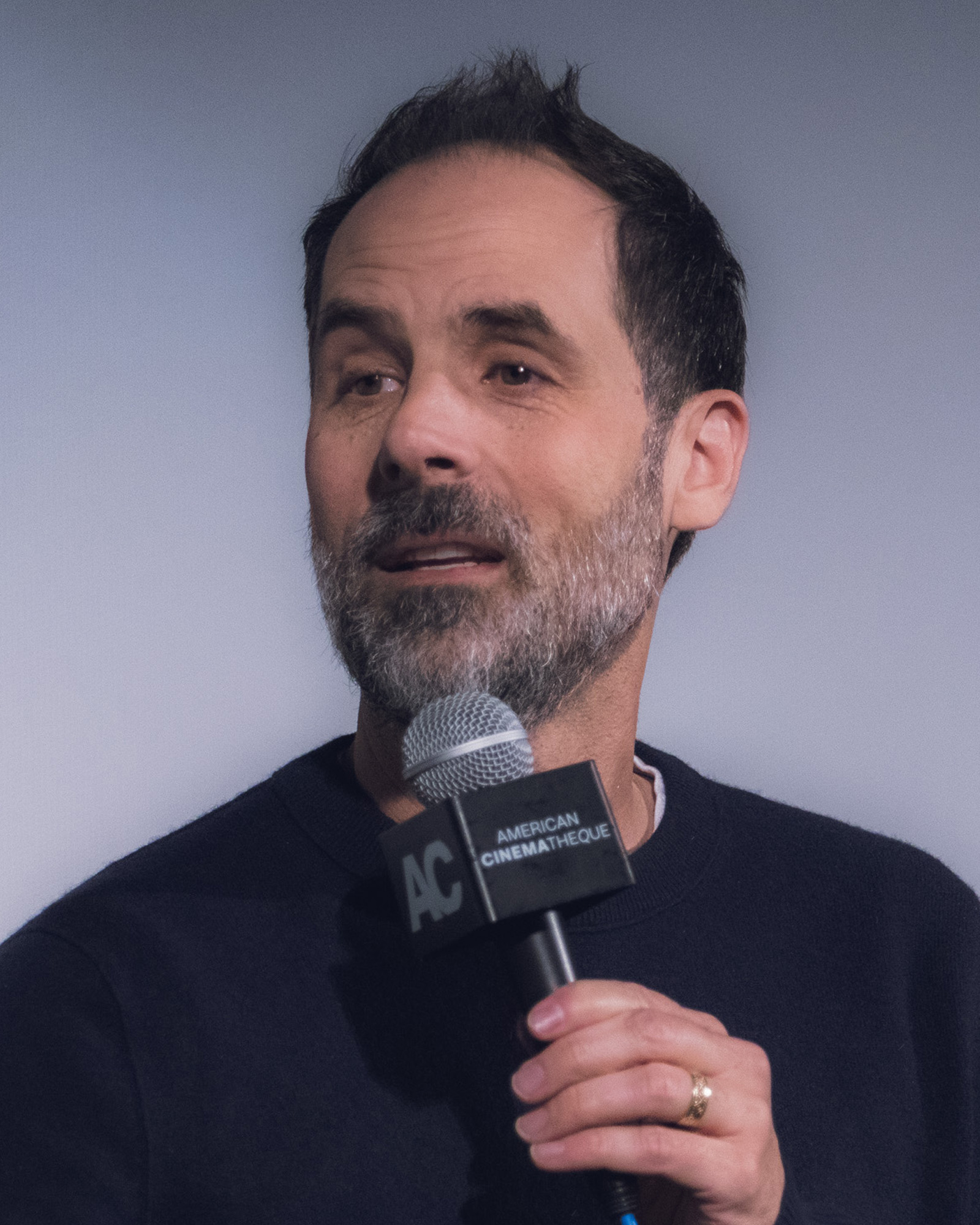
- Mann in 2024
- Born: November 16, 1974 (age 51)
- Education: Northern Michigan University (BFA)
- Occupations: Film director; storyboard artist
- Years active: 2003–present
- Employers: Cartoon Network Studios (2003–2009); Pixar Animation Studios (2009–2026)

Kelsey Mann (born November 16, 1974) is an American film director and storyboard artist. He is best known for directing the Pixar animated film Inside Out 2 (2024), which earned him an Academy Award nomination for the Best Animated Feature.

== Early life and education ==
Mann graduated from Burnsville High School in 1993. He went on to attend Northern Michigan University, where he earned a Bachelor of Fine Arts illustration in 1998.

== Career ==
Mann started his career at Cartoon Network, where he worked as a storyboard artist on Duck Dodgers, Megas XLR, My Gym Partner's a Monkey, Foster's Home for Imaginary Friends, and Star Wars: The Clone Wars, before joining Pixar in 2009, where he started as a story supervisor for Monsters University, The Good Dinosaur (also co-wrote the story for the film), and Onward. He made his directorial debut with the short film Party Central, which he also wrote, taking place shortly after Monsters University.

In September 2022, during the D23 Expo announcement, Mann was announced to direct the feature film Inside Out 2, which serves as the sequel to the 2015 film Inside Out, taking over for Pete Docter, who is instead the executive producer of the film, which was released on June 14, 2024. In 2025, for Inside Out 2, Mann received an Academy Award nomination for the Best Animated Feature.

In October 2026, it was announced that Mann had signed with United Talent Agency (UTA), having left Pixar to focus his career as an independent director and creator.

== Filmography ==
=== Films ===
Year	Title	Director	Story	Story Supervisor	Other	Notes
2013	Monsters University	No	No	Yes	No	
2015	The Good Dinosaur	No	Yes	Yes	No	
2020	Onward	No	No	Yes	Yes	Additional Story Material
2020	Soul	No	No	No	Yes	Special Thanks
2021	Luca	No	No	No	Yes	Pixar Senior Creative Team
2022	Turning Red	No	No	No	Yes	Pixar Senior Creative Team
2022	Lightyear	No	No	No	Yes	Pixar Senior Creative Team
2023	Elemental	No	No	No	Yes	Pixar Senior Creative Team
2024	Inside Out 2	Yes	Yes	No	Yes	Pixar Senior Creative Team
2025	Elio	No	No	No	Yes	Pixar Senior Creative Team
2026	Hoppers	No	No	No	Yes	Pixar Senior Creative Team
2026	Toy Story 5	No	No	No	Yes	Pixar Senior Creative Team

=== Short films ===
Year	Title	Director	Writer	Other	Notes
2013	Party Central	Yes	Yes	Yes	Additional Voices
2019	Purl	No	No	Yes	Voice of Office Bros
2020	Lamp Life	No	No	Yes	Special Thanks
2022	Cars on the Road: Gettin' Hitched	No	No	Yes	Pixar Senior Creative Team

=== Television series ===
Year	Title	Director	Storyboard Supervisor	Storyboard Artist	Background Artist	Background Designer	Creative Consultant	Notes
2003	Kid Notorious	No	Yes	Yes	No	No	No	
2003–2005	Duck Dodgers	No	No	No	Yes	Key	No	
2004–2005	Megas XLR	Yes	No	Yes	No	No	No	
2006	The Amazing Screw-On Head	No	No	Yes	No	No	No	
2006–2007	My Gym Partner's a Monkey	No	No	Yes	No	No	No	
2006–2009	Foster's Home for Imaginary Friends	No	No	Yes	No	No	No	
2007	Shorty McShorts' Shorts	No	No	Yes	No	No	No	Episode: The Imperfect Duplicates of Dodger Dare
2008	Underfist: Halloween Bash	No	No	Additional	No	No	No	Television special
2009–2010	Star Wars: The Clone Wars	No	No	Yes	No	No	No	
2010	Sym-Bionic Titan	No	No	Yes	No	No	No	
2012	Ultimate Spider-Man	No	No	Yes	No	No	No	
2021	Monsters at Work	No	No	No	No	No	Yes	

== Accolades ==
Accolades received by Kelsey Mann
Award	Date	Category	Nominated work	Result	Ref(s)
Academy Awards	March 2, 2025	Best Animated Feature	Inside Out 2	Nominated	
Astra Film Awards	December 8, 2024	Best First Feature	Inside Out 2	Nominated	
Visual Effects Society Awards	February 11, 2025	Outstanding Visual Effects in an Animated Feature	Inside Out 2	Nominated	
