= Tempest (2015 film) =

- Directed by: Saatvik Arya
- Written by: Saatvik Arya
- Produced by: Saatvik Arya
- Release date: 21 March 2015
- Running time: 3 minutes
- Country: India
- Language: English

Tempest is a 2015 independent animation short film directed, animated and written by Saatvik Arya. The film was completed by Saatvik Arya at the age of 14 years.

Tempest held its US premiere on 21 March 2015 at the School Daze Movie Fest in Oregon, United States. As of December 2015, it has been accepted in competition by more than 15 international film festivals including Gold Coast International Film Festival 2015, ENIMATION Little Elephant – International Children and Youth Film Festival, Slovenia and YOUKI-International Youth Media Festival, Austria.

== Premise ==
After being struck by lightning during a super-storm, two teenagers must decide how to use their newly gained superpowers: For good, or for evil.

== Official Selections and Screenings ==
Year	Association	Location	Country
2015	Gold Coast International Film Festival	New York	United States
2015	YOUKI – International Youth Media Festival	Wels	Austria
2015	ENIMATION Little Elephant – International Children and Youth Film Festival	Maribor	Slovenia
2015	Red Dirt International Film Festival	Oklahoma	United States
2015	Student Art Festival	Orlando, Florida	United States
2015	Superman Celebration Film Festival	Metropolis, Illinois	United States
2015	School Daze Movie Fest	Oregon	United States
2015	Columbia Gorge Film Festival	Los Angeles, California	United States
2015	Near Nazareth Film Festival	Afula	Israel
2015	Brighton Youth Film Festival	Brighton	United Kingdom
2015	Awareness Film Festival	Los Angeles, California	United States
2015	Steam House Coffee Co. Independent Film and Artistic Achievement Awards	Modesto, California	United States
2015	AnimaSyros – Videotheque section	Athens	Greece
2015	EyeCatcher International Film Festival	Oklahoma	United States
2015	Salt Flats Film Festival	Utah	United States
2015	Flixx Fest		United States
