= Pixar Short Films Collection, Volume 2 =

- DVD cover
- Production companies: Pixar Animation Studios; Walt Disney Pictures
- Distributed by: Walt Disney Studios; Home Entertainment
- Release date: November 13, 2012 (United States)
- Running time: 75 minutes
- Country: United States
- Languages: English (menu, Your Friend the Rat, BURN-E, Dug's Special Mission, George and A.J., Hawaiian Vacation, Air Mater, Small Fry, and Time Travel Mater)

Pixar Short Films Collection, Volume 2 is a 2012 DVD and Blu-ray compilation of the Pixar animated short films following the 2007 Pixar Short Films Collection Volume 1 and the 1996 Tiny Toy Stories. It features 12 shorts that were released from 2007 through 2012 and it includes some student films from Pixar's directors as bonus features. Volume 2 was released on November 13, 2012, by Walt Disney Studios Home Entertainment. It is followed by Pixar Short Films Collection, Volume 3, which was released on November 13, 2018.

== Main shorts ==
No.	Title	Directed by	Written by	Original release date
1	Your Friend the Rat	Jim Capobianco	Jim Capobianco	November 6, 2007
2	Presto	Doug Sweetland	Doug Sweetland	June 10, 2008
3	BURN-E	Angus MacLane	Andrew Stanton, Angus MacLane and Derek Thompson	November 18, 2008
4	Partly Cloudy	Peter Sohn	Peter Sohn	May 29, 2009
5	Dug's Special Mission	Ronnie del Carmen	Ronnie del Carmen and Bob Peterson	November 10, 2009
6	George and A.J.	Josh Cooley	Josh Cooley	November 12, 2009
7	Day & Night	Teddy Newton	Teddy Newton	June 18, 2010
8	Hawaiian Vacation	Gary Rydstrom	Gary Rydstrom, Jason Katz and Erik Benson	June 24, 2011
9	Air Mater	Robert Gibbs	TBD	November 1, 2011
10	Small Fry	Angus MacLane	Angus MacLane	November 23, 2011
11	Time Travel Mater	Robert Gibbs	TBD	June 5, 2012
12	La Luna	Enrico Casarosa	Enrico Casarosa	June 6, 2011

== Bonus feature ==
The collection also includes student films by Pixar directors John Lasseter, Andrew Stanton and Pete Docter:

- Nitemare
- Lady & the Lamp
- Somewhere in the Arctic
- A Story
- Winter
- Palm Springs
- Next Door

== Story plots for student shorts ==
Nitemare
This is one of John Lasseter's student films made for California Institute of the Arts (Cal Arts). In it, a boy cannot go to sleep because he sees his furniture turn into monsters every time he turns out his lights. He keeps turning the lights on and off to see the monsters appear and disappear. Finally one of the monsters does not change back into furniture when the lights are on. The boy goes over to the monster and gives it a pop with his cork and string gun. The monster begins to cry and the boy lets it sleep in his bed with him. The lights go off again, and you can hear the sounds of furniture scuffing the floor. The light goes back on to reveal that all of the monsters are in the bed, which forced the boy onto the floor.
The Lady & the Lamp
Another of John Lasseter's student short films for Cal Arts, the film depicts a lamp shop owner telling all of his lamps to be on their best behavior because he is expecting an important customer. While he gets his shop ready, he accidentally pushes one lamp on the end of a shelf off into the floor, breaking the lamp's bulb. The lamp then goes to look for a lightbulb in a cabinet but accidentally screws in a bottle of gin. The lamp then pulls its cord to turn the light on but all of the alcohol goes down instead. The lamp, now drunk, begins to knock over the other lamps in the shop which causes the whole shop to be busted up. The shop owner comes back to see this mess just when a lady (the important customer) comes in. She does not even notice the mess but looks to see the one drunk lamp and exclaims that it is the perfect lamp. She purchases the lamp and the film ends.
