= Flawless Life =

- Film poster
- Directed by: Özgül Gürbüz
- Written by: Özgül Gürbüz
- Produced by: Berat İlk
- Edited by: Özgül Gürbüz, Çiğdem Yersel, Semih Vardar
- Music by: Mert Oktan
- Release date: 29 February 2012
- Running time: 2 minutes 30 seconds
- Country: Turkey

Flawless Life is a 2012 Turkish animated short film written and directed by Özgül Gürbüz. The film won the Best Animation, Best Screenplay, Best Visual awards for Animated Film Category at the 2012 Los Angeles Woman's Independent Film Festival.

== Plot ==
One day a homeless man finds something and it changes his life...
