= The Blue Umbrella (2013 film) =

- Poster for the film's premiere at the Berlin International Film Festival
- Directed by: Saschka Unseld
- Written by: Saschka Unseld
- Produced by: Marc Greenberg
- Cinematography: Brian Boyd
- Edited by: Jason Hudak
- Music by: Jon Brion
- Production company: Pixar Animation Studios
- Distributed by: Walt Disney Studios; Motion Pictures (Note: Distributed by Walt Disney Studios Motion Pictures through the Walt Disney Pictures banner.)
- Release dates: February 12, 2013 (Berlin International Film Festival); June 21, 2013 (with Monsters University)
- Running time: 7 minutes
- Country: United States

The Blue Umbrella is a 2013 American animated short film produced by Pixar Animation Studios that was released alongside the feature film Monsters University. The short was written and directed by Saschka Unseld of Pixar's technical department. The short features techniques such as photorealistic lighting, shading, and compositing.

== Plot ==
A city scene is brought to life by a rainstorm. Many objects along the street – signs, lights, awnings, mailboxes, buildings, houses, drains, drain pipes, rain gutters, windows, doors – appear to come to life and develop faces and expressions of their own, enjoying the shower. People pass on the street under their umbrellas, all of which are seemly black, except for a singular blue umbrella. As his owner stops at a street corner, the blue umbrella sees a pretty red umbrella next to him. The two exchange nervous glances, and soon become smitten with each other, but their owners' paths diverge.

Seeing this, the objects along the street begin to work with each other to bring the umbrellas together. As the blue umbrella is about to be taken into the subway station, a sign allows the wind to blow the umbrella out of his owner's hands. The umbrella is floating through the air toward his destination when a sudden gust of wind caused by a passing bus veers him off course and he lands in the street. With the umbrella in danger from the traffic, the objects attempt to protect him from oncoming cars: a construction sign lights up to redirect an oncoming vehicle, a gurgling drain pipe spews water to push him out of the way, another construction sign falls on him to fling him away from another car, and a drain blasts him into the air, but he is hit by a truck, much to the distress of the objects that have tried to help him.

Battered and bent, the umbrella is found by his owner who straightens him out just as the owner of the red umbrella approaches to help him up, reuniting the two of them. The objects of the city silently celebrate their reunion as the umbrellas' owners sit down together at a local café, allowing the two umbrellas to be together after all.

== Production ==
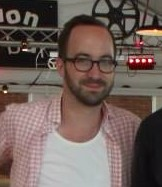
Saschka Unseld, the director of the film, at the 2013 Annecy International Animated Film Festival

Unseld said he conceptualized the story after finding an abandoned umbrella one day in San Francisco. As inspiration, Unseld and his colleagues took photographs of inanimate objects found in city streets throughout New York City, San Francisco, Chicago, and Paris. Unseld has described the short as "a love declaration to the rain".

Pixar's rendering system was updated to include algorithms capable of rendering new types of lighting and reflection, a technique referred to as global illumination.

Many of the shots use artificial pareidolia to cause faces to be seen in various inanimate objects. As with most other Pixar shorts, The Blue Umbrella is "absent of dialogue and long on the use of visual and musical cues to elicit an emotional response".

== Release ==
The Blue Umbrella premiered on February 12, 2013, at the 63rd Berlin International Film Festival. The short received a wide release on June 21, 2013 in front of Pixar's feature Monsters University. It is included on the Monsters University DVD and Blu-ray, and is also included on the DVD and Blu-ray of Pixar Short Films Collection, Volume 3 released on November 13, 2018.

Jon Brion's score, featuring Sarah Jaffe's vocals, was released digitally by Walt Disney Records on July 9, 2013.

== Critical reception ==
The short has been critically acclaimed. Collider gave the short an A, and concluded its review with: "Without ruining the rest of the story, I'll just say that The Blue Umbrella is an enjoyable little short at six minutes and change. It's a nice boy-meets-girl tale that introduces a number of memorable and original characters in the city that, upon viewing it, will have you smiling and seeing faces everywhere you go. It's clever, cute and quirky, and a fitting opener for Pixar's Monsters University. National Post gave the film 3.5/4 stars, writing "Directed by Saschka Unseld, who worked on Toy Story 3 and Brave, The Blue Umbrella is six minutes of rain-beaten beauty", and describing it as "sure-to-be-Oscar-nominated".
