= Cars Toons =

American animated short series by Pixar

- Directed by: John Lasseter; Rob Gibbs; Jeremy Lasky
- Based on: Cars by: John Lasseter; Joe Ranft; Jorgen Klubien
- Produced by: Kimberly Adams
- Starring: Larry the Cable Guy; Keith Ferguson (2008–2013); Owen Wilson (2014)
- Music by: Mark Mothersbaugh; BT; Bruno Coon; Mark Watters
- Production companies: Walt Disney Pictures; Pixar Animation Studios
- Distributed by: Disney-ABC Domestic Television (television releases); Walt Disney Studios Motion Pictures (theatrical releases); Walt Disney Studios Home Entertainment (direct-to-video releases)
- Running time: 2–7 minutes
- Country: United States
- Language: English

Cars Toons is an American animated short series based on the Cars franchise. It features Lightning McQueen, Mater, and their friends in comedic antics and adventures canonical to the films. Larry the Cable Guy reprises his role as Mater while Keith Ferguson replaces Owen Wilson as the voice of Lightning McQueen until "The Radiator Springs 500 ½", when Wilson reprises his role.

The series premiered on October 27, 2008, with "Rescue Squad Mater" on Disney Channel, Toon Disney and ABC Family. Not exclusive to television, the shorts were also released on home media and/or as theatrical shorts. The series ended on May 20, 2014, with "The Radiator Springs 500 ½".

== Premise ==
=== Mater's Tall Tales ===
The series presumably takes place between the events of Cars and Cars 2 (sometime after Mater and the Ghostlight), seeing as it was aired mostly before 2011, and judging by Lighting McQueen retaining his "Radiator Springs" appearance from the end of Cars. This doesn't apply for the "Time Travel Mater" episode though, where he retains his "World Grand Prix" appearance from Cars 2 and Mater's Tall Tales: Tales from Radiator Springs, while in the flashbacks of "Unidentified Flying Mater" and "Rescue Squad Mater", he has his appearance from the original film.

All Cars Toons in Mater's Tall Tales follow a shared formula: Each episode opens with Mater saying, "If I'm lying, I'm crying!" and then the title card. Next, McQueen and Mater see something that results in the latter proceeding to tell the former a “tall tale” about something he supposedly did in the past, before the action shifts to the flashback of Mater's story. At a midway point, the action briefly shifts back to Mater and McQueen in which McQueen questions Mater over whether the events in the story actually occurred (or in some episodes asks him what he did next), resulting in Mater proclaiming that McQueen was also involved ("You was there too!"). The flashback then resumes with McQueen's sudden and usually unwilling participation in the story's events. After Mater finishes his tall tale, McQueen denies the fact that Mater's tale is real before one or more characters/elements involved in the story coincidentally appear to McQueen's shock (with the exceptions of "Tokyo Mater", "Unidentified Flying Mater" and "Time Travel Mater"), paradoxically suggesting that Mater's story really happened.

All episodes also feature Mia and Tia and various pit crew forklifts in supporting roles (with the exception of "Time Travel Mater").

=== Tales from Radiator Springs ===
All Cars Toons in Tales from Radiator Springs follow the daily lives of McQueen, Mater and their friends in their hometown Radiator Springs, the shorts are set between the events of Cars 2 and Cars 3.

== Voice cast ==
- Larry the Cable Guy as Mater
- Keith Ferguson (2008–2013) / Owen Wilson (2014) as Lightning McQueen
- George Carlin (2009, archive recordings) / Lloyd Sherr (2013–2014) as Fillmore
- Tony Shalhoub as Luigi
- Guido Quaroni as Guido
- Michael Wallis as Sheriff
- Katherine Helmond as Lizzie
- Lindsey Collins as Mia
- Elissa Knight as Tia
- Jerome Ranft as Red (only in Tales from Radiator Springs)

== Production ==
Production of the series began in 2006 following the success of Cars. The first nine shorts were produced by Pixar, while all the following shorts were produced by Pixar's subsidiary, Pixar Canada.

"Tokyo Mater" premiered in theaters with Bolt on December 12, 2008. The short is the first Disney/Pixar production presented in Disney Digital 3-D and was also shown in regular 2-D showings of the film. However, it is not featured on the film's home media releases by instead featuring a different short, Super Rhino. Sulley and Mike from Monsters, Inc. make cameo appearances in "Tokyo Mater" as their car forms from the credits of the first film.

== Release ==
=== Merchandise ===
The Disney·Pixar Cars Die-Cast Line included die-casts of various characters from the shorts, including "Rescue Squad Mater", "Mater the Greater", and "El Materdor", in the toy line.

=== Video game ===
A video game based on the series titled Cars Toon: Mater's Tall Tales was developed by Papaya Studio and released on October 19, 2010 for the Wii. A PC version was also released outside the United States and on Steam worldwide in 2014.

=== Home media ===
A DVD and Blu-ray compilation of the first nine shorts, titled Cars Toons: Mater's Tall Tales, was released on November 2, 2010. The compilation includes "Mater the Greater", "Rescue Squad Mater", "Monster Truck Mater", "Unidentified Flying Mater", "El Materdor", "Moon Mater", "Heavy Metal Mater", "Mater Private Eye" and "Tokyo Mater". "Moon Mater" and "Mater Private Eye" debuted in this set.

"Air Mater" and "Time Travel Mater" were released on Pixar Short Films Collection, Volume 2, while the former was also released as a bonus short on home media releases of Cars 2. "Hiccups", "Bugged", and "Spinning" were released on Disney.com and YouTube. "The Radiator Springs 500 ½" was released on Pixar Short Films Collection, Volume 3.

=== YouTube ===
Mater's Tall Tales were added to the Disney Jr. YouTube channel from January through August 2024, where they accumulated about 22 million views, with the most-watched episodes being "Tokyo Mater" (17M) and "Monster Truck Mater" (5M).

=== Unreleased short ===
In addition to "The Radiator Springs 500 ½", which was released in 2014, director Rob Gibbs revealed at the 2013 Disney D23 Expo a fifth Cars Toons: Tales from Radiator Springs episode titled "To Protect and Serve". The short was expected to debut in 2015 on Disney Channel, but it ended up being unreleased for unknown reasons. Despite never being released, it did receive merchandise, including die-cast models and a book. The book contains several images from the short. In the short, Sheriff goes on a mandatory vacation, leaving 2 squad cars in charge. However, the squad cars soon wreak havoc on the town by ticketing everyone for minor offenses.

== Short films ==
Series	Episodes	Originally released	
Series	Episodes	First released	Last released
Mater's Tall Tales	11	October 27, 2008	June 5, 2012
Tales from Radiator Springs	4	March 22, 2013	May 20, 2014

=== Mater's Tall Tales (2008–2012) ===
No.	Title	Directed by	Original release date	Original release
1	"Rescue Squad Mater"	John Lasseter	October 27, 2008	Toon Disney
Mater is working as a fire truck and has to rescue Lightning McQueen from a burning building. After he saves McQueen, the ambulance rushes McQueen to the hospital where Mater reveals that he's also a doctor (with an MD, PhD, STP and GTO).: Role: Fire Truck (and briefly Doctor); Guest stars: Bret Parker as Ambulance, Laraine Newman as Nurse GTO, Peter Sohn as Panicked Car
2	"Mater the Greater"	John Lasseter	October 28, 2008	Toon Disney
Mater is a daredevil, dressing in a style like that of Evel Knievel. In a stadium, Mater attempts to jump a long line of cars, but instead merely tiptoes over them. He performs other stunts, and later claims Lightning McQueen failed to jump over Carburetor Canyon while strapped to a rocket.: Role: Daredevil; Guest stars: Jess Harnell as Announcer
3	"El Materdor"	John Lasseter	October 29, 2008	Toon Disney
Mater is a matador fighting a herd of bulldozers in Spain. When Lightning McQueen enters the story, the bulldozers chase after him due to his red paint job.: Role: Matador; Guest stars: Peter Sohn as Padre
4	"Tokyo Mater"	John Lasseter	November 21, 2008	Theatrically with Bolt
Mater offers to tow home a stranded Japanese car inspired by the Toyota Century named Ito-San, but ends up in Tokyo, Japan after hauling him all the way across the Pacific Ocean. He is subsequently challenged to a race by the Drift King Kabuto (a car resembling Boost, the leader of The Delinquent Road Hazards), with the winner being crowned "King of All Drifters" and the loser being stripped of all custom modifications to become a "stock" car. "Lightning Dragon McQueen" shows up to help Mater fend off an attack from Kabuto's ninjas and then helps Mater catch up with Kabuto and win the race.: Role: Drift King; Guest stars: Robert Ito as Ito San, Mach Tony Kobayashi as Kabuto, Jack Angel as Lightning Dragon McQueen Announcer; Note: Automobile versions of James P. Sullivan and Mike Wazowski from Monsters, Inc. (who also appeared in the credits of the original Cars) appear in the background.
5	"Unidentified Flying Mater"	John Lasseter	November 20, 2009	Disney Channel
Mater befriends a small flying saucer called Mator and they have a night out. When Mator is captured by the military forces, Mater sneaks up and saves him with the help of Lightning McQueen and Mator's Mama Ship.: Role: UFO
6	"Monster Truck Mater"	John Lasseter	July 30, 2010	Disney Channel
Mater, alias "The Tormentor", is a monster truck wrestler who works his way up the ranks from amateur to World Champion Monster Truck Wrestler, fighting against all kinds of characters along the way. These trucks include the I-Screamer, Captain Collision, The Rasta Carian, Dr. Feel Bad, and Paddy O'Concrete. When faced with his biggest opponent yet, the Monster of Dr. Frankenwagon, Mater tags in his "tag team partner", Lightning McQueen, alias "Frightening McMean".: Role: Monster Truck Wrestler; Guest stars: Danny Mann as Referee/Dr. Frankenwagon, Jan Rabson as I-Screamer/Dr. Feel Bad/Paddy O'Concrete, Jess Harnell as Captain Collision/Announcer/Fan
7	"Heavy Metal Mater"	John Lasseter	October 8, 2010	Disney Channel
Mater is a rock star in a heavy metal band. He starts out in a garage band called "Mater & The Gas Caps" and rises to the top with his hit song, "Dadgum" (which bears a heavy-metal style by accident when the drummer goes crazy trying to kill a fly on the drum while recording an album), a song based on the line Mater is famous for. Lightning McQueen goes on debut to join him on stage in the middle of a huge concert and they rock into history.: Role: Heavy Metal Rock Star; Guest stars: Paul Eiding as Dex Dinoco, Jess Harnell as Forklift Holding Heavy Metal
8	"Moon Mater"	Rob Gibbs	November 2, 2010	Mater's Tall Tales DVD/Blu-ray
Mater is the first tow truck to land on the Moon, with the mission to rescue the Impala XIII by giving him a tow and bringing him back to Earth. Lightning McQueen joins Mater and they are met with a hero's welcome.: Role: Astronaut; Guest stars: Teddy Newton as Impala XIII, Josh Cooley as Roger
9	"Mater Private Eye"	Rob Gibbs	November 2, 2010	Mater's Tall Tales DVD/Blu-ray
Mater is a private investigator working on an open-and-shut case of counterfeit tires, when Tia rolls back into his life. She hires Mater to find her sister, Mia, who's been car-napped. Mater searches for clues and closes in on a major crime scene. Lieutenant Lightning McQueen arrives just in time to help bring the criminals to justice.: Role: Private Investigator; Guest stars: Carol Bach-y-Rita as Carmen, Torbin Xan Bullock as Big D, Danny Mann as Clyde, Jess Harnell as Claude, John Cygan as Stinky
10	"Air Mater"	Rob Gibbs	November 1, 2011	Cars 2 DVD/Blu-ray
A tow service leads Mater to Propwash Junction, a town populated by planes. Amazed by all these flying machines, Mater gets interested in learning how to fly when he sees Skipper's Flight School, which has a sign that says they could teach anyone. After learning how to fly, he learns himself to fly backwards and amazes a group of stunt planes known as the Falcon Hawks. Since one of them has sprained a wing during practice for a stunt show, they ask Mater to take the place of the injured plane. He accepts and becomes the stunt planes' new member. Lightning McQueen, also a stunt plane, helps Mater at one point when he is in trouble.: Role: Stunt Airplane; Guest stars: Stacy Keach as Skipper, Danny Mann as Sparky, Jonathan Adams as Judge Davis, Lori Alan as Blue Hawk, John Cygan as Green Hawk, Paul Eiding as Red Hawk, Bob Bergen as Black Hawk
11	"Time Travel Mater"	Rob Gibbs	June 5, 2012	Disney Channel
Accidentally gaining the ability to travel in time, Mater travels back to 1909 in the middle of a desert where he meets Stanley, the founder of Radiator Springs, who works as a traveling radiator caps salesman. With the realization that if Stanley goes away there would be no Radiator Springs, Mater brings McQueen from the future to which Stanley sells him a radiator cap. Mater then suggests Stanley to settle there and build a town where he could serve broken traveling cars, and Stanley accepts. Jumping to 18 years in the future, in 1927, Stanley shows Mater and McQueen the expanding town when Mater takes a note of a broken Ford Model T, which turns out to be Lizzie. Lizzie's seemingly falling in love with McQueen makes Mater panic again about Radiator Springs' future, but it turns out that Lizzie had her eye on Stanley. After Stanley and Lizzie were introduced to each other by McQueen, he and Mater make another time jump, where they attend Stanley and Lizzie's wedding before returning to the present. There, Lizzie thanks McQueen for introducing her and Stanley.: Role: Time Traveler; Guest star: John Michael Higgins as Stanley

=== Tales from Radiator Springs (2013–2014) ===
No.	Title	Directed by	Original release date	Original release
1	"Hiccups"	Jeremy Lasky	March 22, 2013	Disney Channel
Lightning McQueen gets hiccups while drinking oil. Many of the Radiator Springs residents give him advice on how to cure the hiccups, but none of the ideas work until Sally kisses him on the cheek, curing McQueen of his hiccups. Sheriff then starts getting hiccups, which leads to Mater, thinking that kissing will help all hiccups, attempting to kiss Sheriff to cure them, leading to a chase between Sheriff and Mater.
2	"Bugged"	Jeremy Lasky	March 22, 2013	Disney Channel
Red's morning routine is interrupted by a pesky bug, which he attempts to get rid of.: Note: This is the only Cars Toon episode not to feature Lightning McQueen or Mater.
3	"Spinning"	Jeremy Lasky	March 22, 2013	Disney Channel
Luigi assigns Guido to shake his store's sign to draw in customers. When Guido discovers his hidden talent as a street corner sign spinner, he draws in a huge crowd.: Note: This is the last Cars Toon episode to feature Keith Ferguson as the voice of Lightning McQueen.
4	"The Radiator Springs 500 ½"	Rob Gibbs	May 20, 2014; August 1, 2014	Disney Movies Anywhere; Disney Channel
Radiator Springs celebrates a Founders Day honoring the late Stanley when a gang of racers descend on the town and challenge Lightning McQueen to an off-road race.: Guest stars: John Cygan as Idle Threat, Jess Harnell as Blue Grit, Danny Mann as Shifty Sidewinder, and Steve Purcell as Sandy Dunes.; Note: This is the only Cars Toon episode to feature Owen Wilson as the voice of Lightning McQueen.

== Characters ==
=== Mater's Tall Tales ===
Characters	Rescue Squad Mater	Mater The Greater	El Materdor	Tokyo Mater	Unidentified Flying Mater	Monster Truck Mater	Heavy Metal Mater	Moon Mater	Mater Private Eye	Air Mater	Time Travel Mater
Mater	Larry the Cable Guy	Larry the Cable Guy	Larry the Cable Guy	Larry the Cable Guy	Larry the Cable Guy	Larry the Cable Guy	Larry the Cable Guy	Larry the Cable Guy	Larry the Cable Guy	Larry the Cable Guy	Larry the Cable Guy
Lightning McQueen	Keith Ferguson	Keith Ferguson	Keith Ferguson	Keith Ferguson	Keith Ferguson	Keith Ferguson	Keith Ferguson	Keith Ferguson	Keith Ferguson	Keith Ferguson	Keith Ferguson
Tia	Elissa Knight	Elissa Knight	Elissa Knight	Elissa Knight	Elissa Knight	Elissa Knight	Elissa Knight	Elissa Knight	Elissa Knight	Elissa Knight	
Mia	Lindsey Collins	Lindsey Collins	Lindsey Collins	Uncredited actress	Lindsey Collins	Lindsey Collins	Lindsey Collins	Lindsey Collins	Lindsey Collins	Lindsey Collins	
Guido	Silent Cameo	Silent Cameo		Guido Quaroni	Guido Quaroni	Credit only	Guido Quaroni		Silent Cameo	Silent Cameo	
Fillmore		Silent Cameo		Silent Cameo	George Carlin^{(archive recordings)}	Silent Cameo; Credit only	Silent Cameo; Credit only				
Sheriff				Michael Wallis							
Kabuto				Mach Tony Kobayashi							
Ito-San				Robert Ito							
Skipper										Stacy Keach	
Judge Davis										Jonathan Adams	
Sparky										Danny Mann	
Stanley											John Michael Higgins
Lizzie											Katherine Helmond

=== Tales from Radiator Springs ===
Character	Hiccups	Bugged	Spinning	The Radiator Springs 500 ½
Lightning McQueen	Keith Ferguson		Keith Ferguson	Owen Wilson
Mater	Larry the Cable Guy		Silent Cameo	Larry the Cable Guy
Sally	Bonnie Hunt			Bonnie Hunt
Luigi	Tony Shalhoub		Tony Shalhoub	Tony Shalhoub
Guido	Guido Quaroni		Guido Quaroni	Guido Quaroni
Flo	Jenifer Lewis			Jenifer Lewis
Sarge	Paul Dooley		Paul Dooley	Paul Dooley
Fillmore	Lloyd Sherr		Lloyd Sherr	Lloyd Sherr
Sheriff	Michael Wallis		Michael Wallis	Michael Wallis
Red	Jerome Ranft	Jerome Ranft	Silent Cameo	Silent Cameo
Ramone			Cheech Marin	Cheech Marin
Lizzie				Katherine Helmond

- Note: A gray cell indicates the character was not in the episode.
