= Pixar Canada =

Former Pixar animation studio subsidiary

- Type: Subsidiary
- Founded: April 2009; 17 years ago (established); April 20, 2010; 16 years ago (opened)
- Defunct: October 2013; 13 years ago
- Fate: Closed
- Headquarters: Vancouver, British Columbia, Canada
- Key people: Amir Nasrabadi (general manager); Dylan Brown (creative director); Darwyn Peachey (chief technical officer)
- Number of employees: 100 (2013)
- Parent: Pixar

Pixar Canada was a short-lived, wholly owned subsidiary of Pixar Animation Studios. It was located in Vancouver, British Columbia. The studio was tasked to produce short films based on Pixar’s feature film characters.

Pixar Animation Studios permanently closed Pixar Canada in October 2013, and laid off its approximately 100 employees to refocus Pixar’s efforts at its main headquarters in Emeryville, California. The former studio space is currently Industrial Light & Magic’s studio in Vancouver.

== History ==
Pixar Canada was established in April 2009, and officially opened on April 20, 2010 in the area of Gastown, Vancouver, British Columbia. The location was chosen for tax incentive reasons, for Vancouver’s computer-generated animation talent pool and for time-zone compatibility with the main studio in California (at the time, Vancouver was on the same time zone as California, using the same DST schedule).

The studio’s initial three-year plan was to produce animated short films, based on established film characters by Pixar, to be shown in all of the related businesses within Disney, including television, DVD compilations, internet, theme park attractions, and theatrical presentations. Post-production and stereoscopic work in 3D remained in the hands of the main studio of Pixar in Emeryville, California.

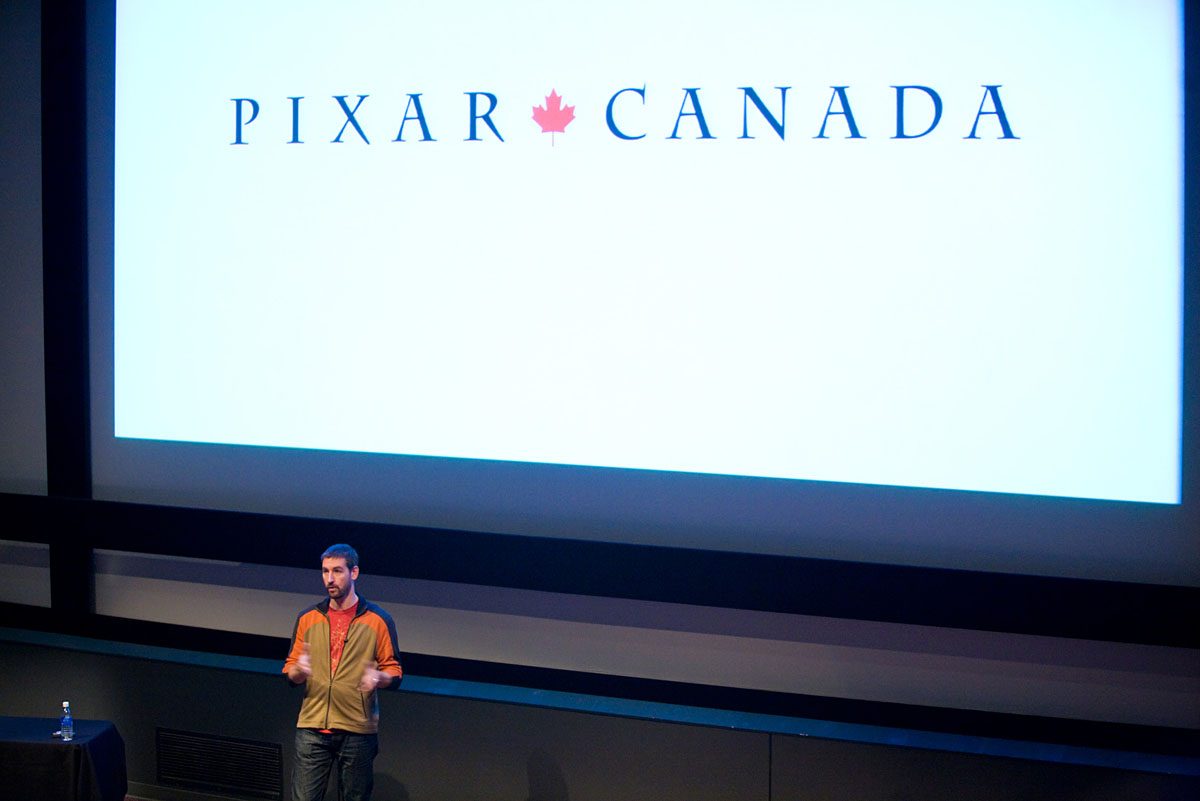
Pixar Canada creative director Dylan Brown speaking in November 2009 at the Vancouver Film School’s Animation & Visual Effects Campus.

Among the films produced were Air Mater, Small Fry, and Partysaurus Rex. Pixar’s shorts also became a proving ground for new directors and for concepts for the studio.

In October 2013, Walt Disney Studios announced its closure, with a loss of nearly 100 jobs. A company spokesperson said the work done in Vancouver would be transferred to the company’s headquarters in Burbank, California. Provincial Jobs Minister Shirley Bond described the closure of the Pixar studio as “disappointing”, but added that she saw the decision as being tied to the company’s overall business strategy, rather than the business climate in British Columbia.

Shortly after the closure of the studio, Disney, which had recently acquired Lucasfilm and its subsidiary companies, Industrial Light & Magic (ILM)’s satellite division in Vancouver, moved into Pixar Canada’s former studio. The ILM studio in Vancouver has subsequently carried out primary character animation and visual effects with the ILM headquarters in San Francisco on several Hollywood films, including Warcraft, The Revenant, and Thor: Ragnarok.

== Filmography ==
Release date	Title	Ref
November 1, 2011	Mater's Tall Tales: Air Mater	
November 23, 2011	Small Fry	
June 5, 2012	Mater's Tall Tales: Time Travel Mater	
September 14, 2012	Partysaurus Rex	
March 22, 2013	Tales from Radiator Springs: Hiccups	
March 22, 2013	Tales from Radiator Springs: Bugged	
March 22, 2013	Tales from Radiator Springs: Spinning	
May 20, 2014	Tales from Radiator Springs: The Radiator Springs 500 ½	
