= Sanjay's Super Team =

- Film poster featuring (on the bottom) Sanjay and (from left to right) Durga, Vishnu and Hanuman
- Directed by: Sanjay Patel
- Written by: Sanjay Patel
- Produced by: Nicole Paradis Grindle
- Edited by: Kevin Rose-Williams
- Music by: Mychael Danna
- Production company: Pixar Animation Studios
- Distributed by: Walt Disney Studios; Motion Pictures (Note: Distributed by Walt Disney Studios Motion Pictures through the Walt Disney Pictures banner.)
- Release dates: June 15, 2015 (Annecy International Animated Film Festival); September 27, 2015 (New York Film Festival); November 25, 2015 (with The Good Dinosaur)
- Running time: 7 minutes
- Country: United States
- Language: English

Sanjay's Super Team is an animated short film produced by Pixar Animation Studios. Written and directed by Sanjay Patel, and based on his childhood, it premiered on June 15, 2015 at the Annecy International Animated Film Festival in France, and accompanied the theatrical release of Pixar's The Good Dinosaur on November 25, 2015.

Inspired by Patel's own childhood when he felt conflicted by the modern world and the Hindu traditions of his family, Sanjay's Super Team follows the daydream of a young Indian boy, bored with his father's religious meditation, who imagines Hindu gods as superheroes.

== Plot ==
A young boy, Sanjay, is watching his favorite superhero show, Super Team, at home and sketching its characters in his notebook. At the same time, his father is trying to meditate at a small Hindu shrine in the same room. Each is annoyed by the sounds of the other's activity until Sanjay's father turns off the television, confiscates his son's Super Team action figure, and makes him participate in prayer. Sanjay retrieves the toy while his father is distracted, but accidentally sets its cape on fire from the shrine's oil lamp. While putting out the cape, he extinguishes the lamp as well and is transported to a temple with three stone statues.

Suddenly, the evil demon king, Ravana, appears and begins to steal the statues' weapons. Sanjay breaks the light-up mechanism in his toy and uses it to ignite the giant lamp in the middle of the room, bringing the statues to life as the gods Vishnu, Durga, and Hanuman. The gods begin to fend off Ravana's attacks and ring their bells to drive him back, but he retaliates, destroying their bells.

Sanjay recognizes the giant lamp as an upside-down bell and breaks his toy on it to ring it aloud, calming Ravana who peacefully departs from the temple. Sanjay receives a new toy from Vishnu as well as his blessing, then finds himself back in the real world, the cape on his action figure intact. His father returns the remote control, disappointed at his son's lack of interest in their cultural traditions. Sanjay begins drawing in his notebook and surprises his father with a new sketch: the gods from his daydream watching over the Super Team heroes.

The story ends with real life pictures of Sanjay Patel and his father, during his childhood and in the present day.

== Production ==
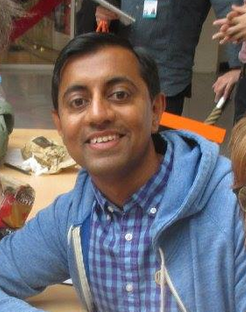
Patel premiered the film at the 2015 Annecy International Animated Film Festival.

The inspiration for the short film came from Patel's own childhood, growing up in San Bernardino in the 1980s, in a family of Indian immigrants. Like many American children of the era, he played with Transformers action figures, watched Looney Tunes cartoons and read Superman comics. He also performed daily Hindu rituals of meditation and prayer with his father. He felt conflicted by his parents' traditions, saying "Our worlds were diametrically apart. I just wanted my name to be Travis, not Sanjay."

Growing up, he became more confident with his identity, although he still found it challenging to openly embrace his Indian background at work. As a child, he "felt deeply the absence of anyone who looked like him in films and television." To "bring a young brown boy's story to the pop culture zeitgeist," Patel first pitched the short to Pixar executives during 2012. Pixar's chief creative officer, John Lasseter, was very welcoming to the idea "about celebrating the personal side of the story."

The film's setting was inspired by the Lido Motel, an old Route 66 motel which his parents bought and worked at when he was a child. Patel started the film with only Vishnu, which served as a "mirror of my father" and would contrast one deity with three superheroes. Then the development team suggested adding more gods, with Patel choosing Durga to showcase a goddess as "in Vedic philosophy, there's always a masculine energy and a feminine energy", and Hanuman for a half animal deity.

The demon-figure was inspired by a number of sources, including the notions of disrespect and greed. Finally, drawing from Buddhist tradition, "the demon isn't vanquished, he isn't destroyed. Once the boy destroys his idol, it makes the monster more human."

== Reception ==
=== Critical response ===
Sanjay's Super Team has an approval rating of 78% on review aggregator website Rotten Tomatoes, based on nine reviews, and an average rating of 6.9/10.

=== Accolades ===
Sanjay's Super Team was nominated for an Annie Award, and for the Academy Award for Best Animated Short Film.
