= Party Central =

- Poster for Party Central
- Directed by: Kelsey Mann
- Written by: Kelsey Mann
- Story by: Austin Madison; Adrian Molina; Manny Hernandez
- Produced by: Laurel Ladevich
- Starring: Billy Crystal; John Goodman; Peter Sohn; Julia Sweeney; Charlie Day; Nathan Fillion; Dave Foley; Sean Hayes; Bobby Moynihan; Joel Murray; Colleen O'Shaughnessey; James Kevin Ward; Cristina Pucelli
- Edited by: Tim Fox
- Music by: Dieter Hartmann
- Production company: Pixar Animation Studios
- Distributed by: Walt Disney Studios; Motion Pictures
- Release dates: August 9, 2013 (D23 Expo); March 21, 2014 (with Muppets Most Wanted)
- Running time: 6 minutes
- Country: United States
- Language: English

Party Central is a 2013 American animated short film produced by Pixar Animation Studios for Walt Disney Pictures and directed by Kelsey Mann. It premiered on August 9, 2013, at the D23 Expo in Anaheim, California and was shown in theaters with Muppets Most Wanted on March 21, 2014. Party Central is the second short in the Monsters, Inc. franchise following Mike's New Car (2002). The short involves Mike and Sulley helping their Oozma Kappa fraternity brothers make their party a success. It is the only Monsters, Inc. production to be rated PG by the MPA.

== Plot ==
Mike and Sulley are visiting the university because Oozma Kappa is throwing its first party, but no one has shown up. However, Mike and Sulley have a plan. Using a couple of borrowed door stations, they sneak into a party at the Roar Omega Roar fraternity and steal all of its food and guests to fill the Oozma Kappa house. The supply runs take them through the closet doors of a married couple's bedroom, repeatedly disturbing their sleep.

Once they have the party fully stocked, Scott "Squishy" Squibbles' mother Sherri walks in on it while doing a load of laundry. She is upset because they did not invite her. After lighting a bonfire on the lawn, Sherri introduces the crowd to "door jumping"/"door jamming", involving jumping from the roof with the help of two doors to land safely on the lawn. The guests congratulate the Oozma Kappas for throwing a successful party, and many of them decide to pledge the fraternity.

In a post-credits scene, the husband and wife wake their son Timmy up and ask if they can sleep with him, saying that there are monsters in their closet. Timmy shouts, "That's what I've been trying to tell you!"

== Voice cast ==
- Billy Crystal as Mike
- John Goodman as Sulley
- Peter Sohn as Squishy
- Julia Sweeney as Sherri
- Charlie Day as Art
- Nathan Fillion as Johnny
- Dave Foley as Terry
- Sean P. Hayes as Terri
- Bobby Moynihan as Chet
- Joel Murray as Don
- Colleen O'Shaughnessey as Mom
- James Kevin Ward as Henry
- Cristina Pucelli as Timmy

== Production ==
According to the short's writer/director Kelsey Mann, "When you first meet the Oozma Kappas, they go to their fraternity house and the first thing they say is, 'Welcome to Party Central! We haven’t thrown a party yet, but when we do we’ll be ready,'... I kept telling [director] Dan [Scanlon], 'I really want to see their party. We have to do it in the credits or something.' Then when the idea of doing a short came up, we were like, 'That could be the party!'" The short took around eight months to make, to which the voices were recorded near the end of production of Monsters University. Mann stated "We would do a couple of pickup lines with Billy Crystal and the other actors for the movie and then we’d get the stuff we needed for the short." Party Central was initially considered as a bonus feature for the Monsters University DVD, but the decision was later made to release the short theatrically. It was originally scheduled to be shown in theaters with The Good Dinosaur until the film was shifted from 2014 to 2015.

== Release ==
Party Central premiered on August 9, 2013, at the D23 Expo in Anaheim, California and was shown in theaters with Muppets Most Wanted on March 21, 2014. Party Central received a PG rating from the MPAA for "some reckless behavior", the first Disney animated short to get higher than a G rating since 1990's Roller Coaster Rabbit.

The short was released for streaming on October 21, 2014, on the Disney Movies Anywhere application for iPhone and iPad, and on the Disney Movies Anywhere website.

=== Home media ===
Party Central was released on Blu-ray, DVD and digital download as part of Pixar Short Films Collection, Volume 3 on November 13, 2018.

== Critical reception ==
After being screened at the D23 Expo, BigScreen Animation noted "judging from Twitter, the response was tremendous." Newsday said "It starts with a simple plot idea and escalates in classic comedy form." Rotoscopers wrote "This short film was a cool, funny idea. Not a story. It was literally a sequence of jokes with no emotional core whatsoever."
