= Monsters University =

2013 film by Dan Scanlon

- Theatrical release poster
- Directed by: Dan Scanlon
- Screenplay by: Dan Gerson; Robert L. Baird; Dan Scanlon
- Story by: Dan Scanlon; Dan Gerson; Robert L. Baird
- Produced by: Kori Rae
- Starring: Billy Crystal; John Goodman; Steve Buscemi; Helen Mirren; Peter Sohn; Joel Murray; Sean Hayes; Dave Foley; Charlie Day; Nathan Fillion
- Cinematography: Matt Aspbury (camera); Jean-Claude Kalache (lighting)
- Edited by: Greg Snyder
- Music by: Randy Newman
- Production company: Pixar Animation Studios
- Distributed by: Walt Disney Studios; Motion Pictures (Note: Distributed under the Walt Disney Pictures banner.)
- Release dates: June 5, 2013 (BFI Southbank); June 21, 2013 (United States)
- Running time: 104 minutes
- Country: United States
- Language: English
- Budget: $200 million
- Box office: $743.6 million

Monsters University is a 2013 American animated comedy film directed by Dan Scanlon and written by Scanlon and the writing team of Dan Gerson and Robert L. Baird. Produced by Pixar Animation Studios for Walt Disney Pictures, it is a prequel to Monsters, Inc. (2001). Randy Newman composed the original score, returning from the first film. The film follows the main characters of Monsters, Inc., James P. "Sulley" Sullivan and Mike Wazowski, and their experience in college leading to them becoming best friends. Billy Crystal, John Goodman, Steve Buscemi, Bob Peterson and John Ratzenberger reprise their roles from the first film, while Bonnie Hunt voices a different character. Helen Mirren, Peter Sohn, Joel Murray, Sean Hayes, Dave Foley, Charlie Day and Nathan Fillion join the voice cast.

Disney, as the rights holder, had plans for a sequel to Monsters, Inc. since 2005. Following disagreements with Pixar, Disney tasked its Circle 7 Animation unit to make the film. An early draft of the film was developed, but Disney's purchase of Pixar in January 2006 led to the cancellation of Circle 7's version of the film. A Pixar-made sequel was confirmed in 2010 and in 2011, it was announced that the film would instead be a prequel titled Monsters University.

Monsters University premiered on June 5, 2013, at the BFI Southbank in London, England, and was theatrically released in the United States on June 21, accompanied by a short film titled The Blue Umbrella. The film received generally positive reviews from critics and grossed $743 million worldwide against its $200 million production budget, making it the seventh highest-grossing film of 2013. Additionally, an animated short tie-in film titled Party Central was released theatrically with Muppets Most Wanted in 2014.

== Plot ==
A young Mike Wazowski visits the Monsters Inc. factory on a class field trip to learn about how "scarers" harness human children's screams for energy to power the monster world. He secretly follows scarer Frank McCay through a door to the human world to watch him work. Frank is concerned by Mike's recklessness but impressed by his stealth, and gives him his Monsters University (MU) cap.

Years later, Mike enrolls in MU's scaring program and Randall "Randy" Boggs is assigned as his roommate. On the first day of class, Abigail Hardscrabble, the dean of the scaring program and president of MU, warns that students who fail the final exam at the end of the semester will leave the program. Mike then meets James P. "Sulley" Sullivan, the son of a famous scarer. Sulley gets into the top fraternity on campus, RΩR (Roar Omega Roar), which rejects Mike for not looking scary enough. Over the next few months, Mike works and studies hard to improve himself while Sulley slacks off, relying on his family name and natural talent. An intense rivalry gradually forms between Mike and Sulley throughout the semester, eventually leading the duo to inadvertently break Hardscrabble's prized scream canister on exam day. She personally tests and fails them both; Sulley for haste and lack of technical knowledge, and Mike for not looking scary enough. Sulley is also kicked out of RΩR.

The next semester, Mike and Sulley both enter the scream can design program, with Sulley blaming Mike for what happened. Determined to prove his worth, Mike enters the annual Scare Games with OK (Oozma Kappa), a small fraternity of misfits who have also failed the scaring program, as his team. He negotiates a deal with Hardscrabble: if OK wins, they and Mike will be allowed to return to the scaring program; otherwise, Mike must leave MU. Mike reluctantly accepts Sulley's offer to join the team after Randy ends his friendship with Mike by joining RΩR. Mike and Sulley's squabbling leads to OK placing last in the first round, but another team is disqualified for cheating, allowing OK to avoid elimination. They also barely pass the second round, and the RΩRs invite OK to a mid-game party, only to humiliate them and post pictures of the prank all over campus.

Mike secretly helps the discouraged OK by taking them on a trip to Monsters Inc., where they watch scarers using their differences as advantages. After being discovered and chased off by security, the rejuvenated team begins working together under Mike's coaching, and passes the next two challenges right behind RΩR. For the final challenge, OK and RΩR face off in a simulator in 1v1 matches, each member trying to frighten a dummy child. OK wins after Mike racks up a maximum score with his scare.

Mike later discovers that Sulley had rigged the simulator's settings to guarantee a winning score on Mike's turn. The disappointed members of OK discard the trophy as Sulley admits his cheating to Hardscrabble, who scolds him for his betrayal. Frustrated with Sulley's lack of faith in him, and determined to prove he is scary, Mike breaks into the school's door lab and sneaks through an experimental door to the human world into a summer camp cabin full of children; however, to his horror, none of them are afraid of him. Feeling responsible for Mike's predicament, Sulley sneaks past security and Hardscrabble to pursue Mike. Sulley admits to Mike his own fears of inadequacy, and they reconcile as Hardscrabble deactivates the door to keep any humans from passing through. Mike and Sulley collaborate to scare a group of park rangers, creating enough energy to power the door from their side, and pass through just before it explodes.

Mike and Sulley are expelled from MU for their actions, but the other OK members are reinstated into the scaring program. As Mike and Sulley leave, an impressed Hardscrabble wishes them well, and orders them to keep surprising people. The duo begin working for Monsters Inc. in the mailroom, and over the years work their way up through the company's ranks until Sulley becomes a scarer, with Mike as his scare assistant.

== Voice cast ==
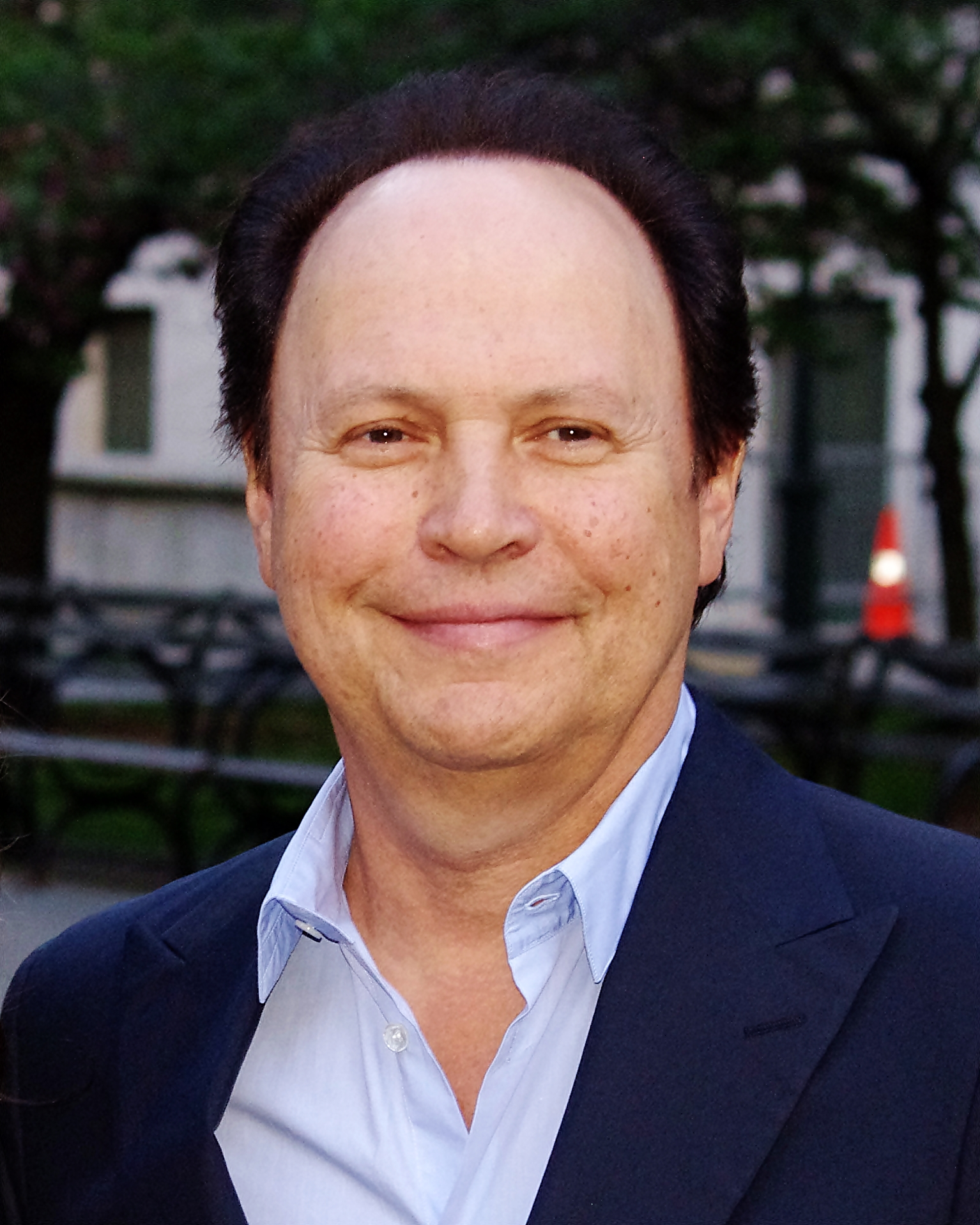
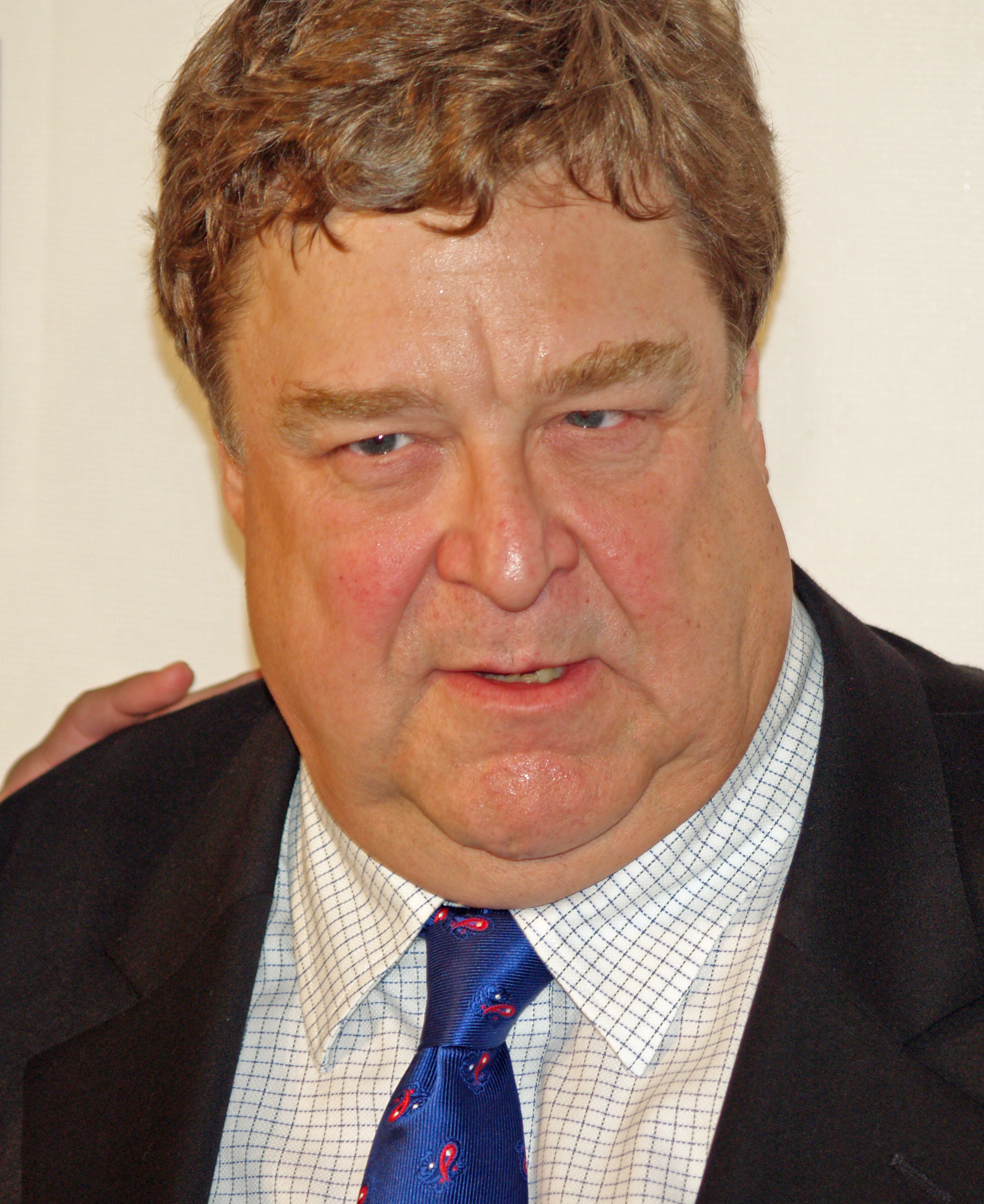
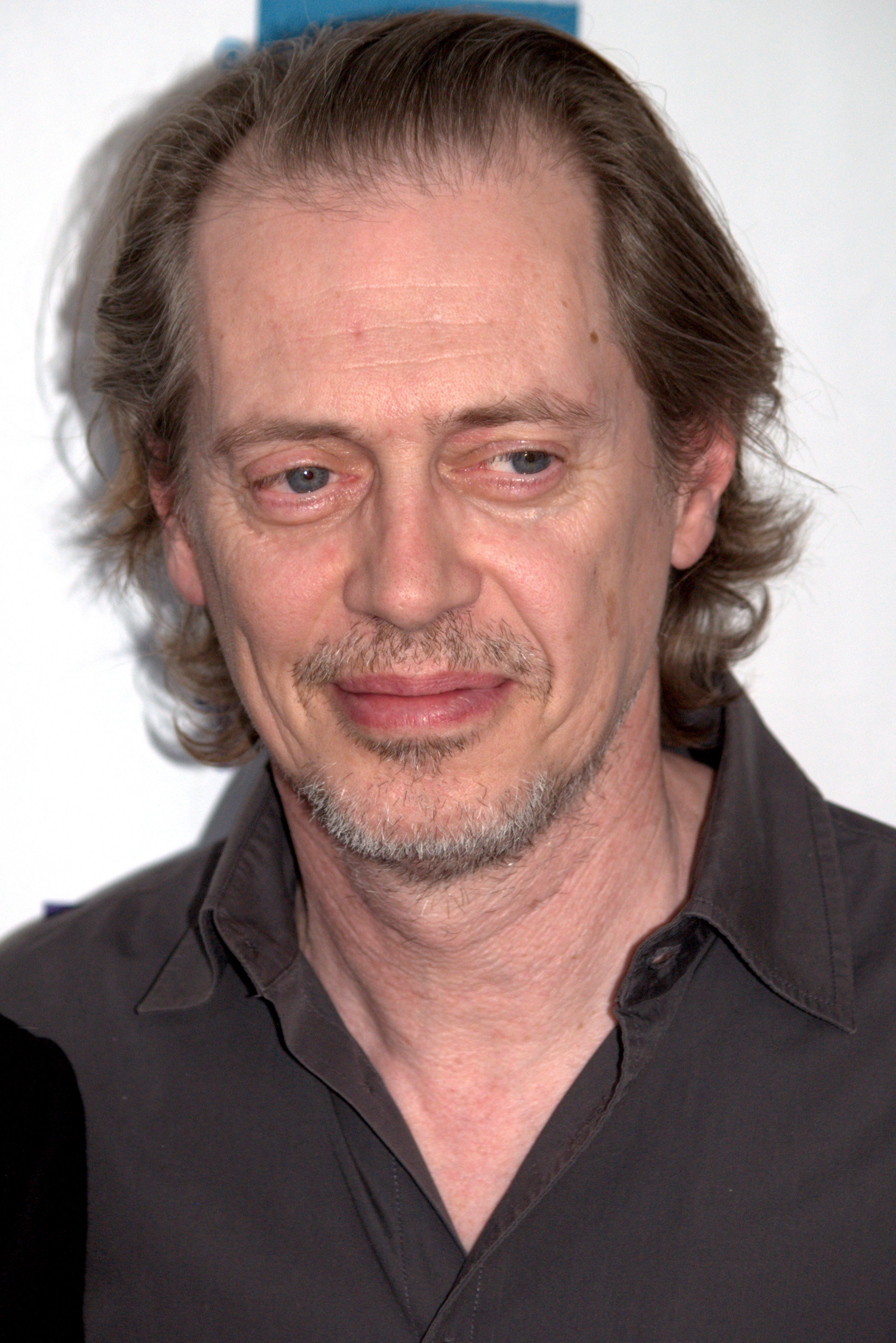
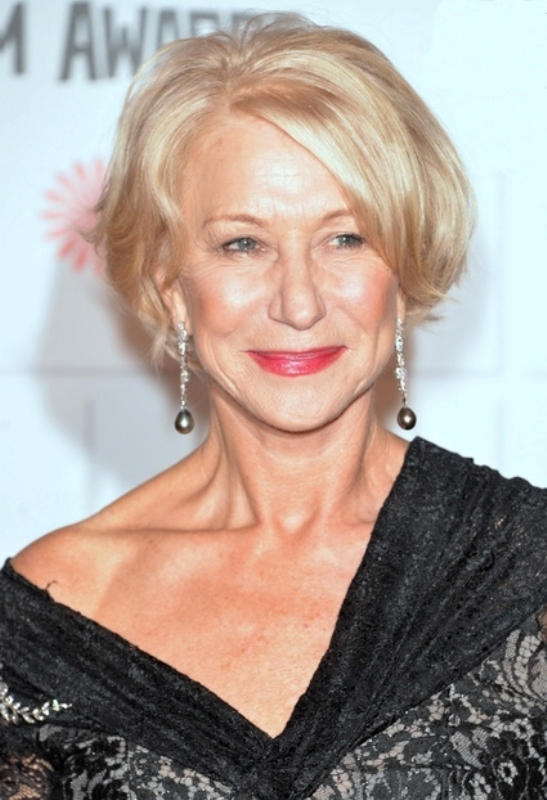
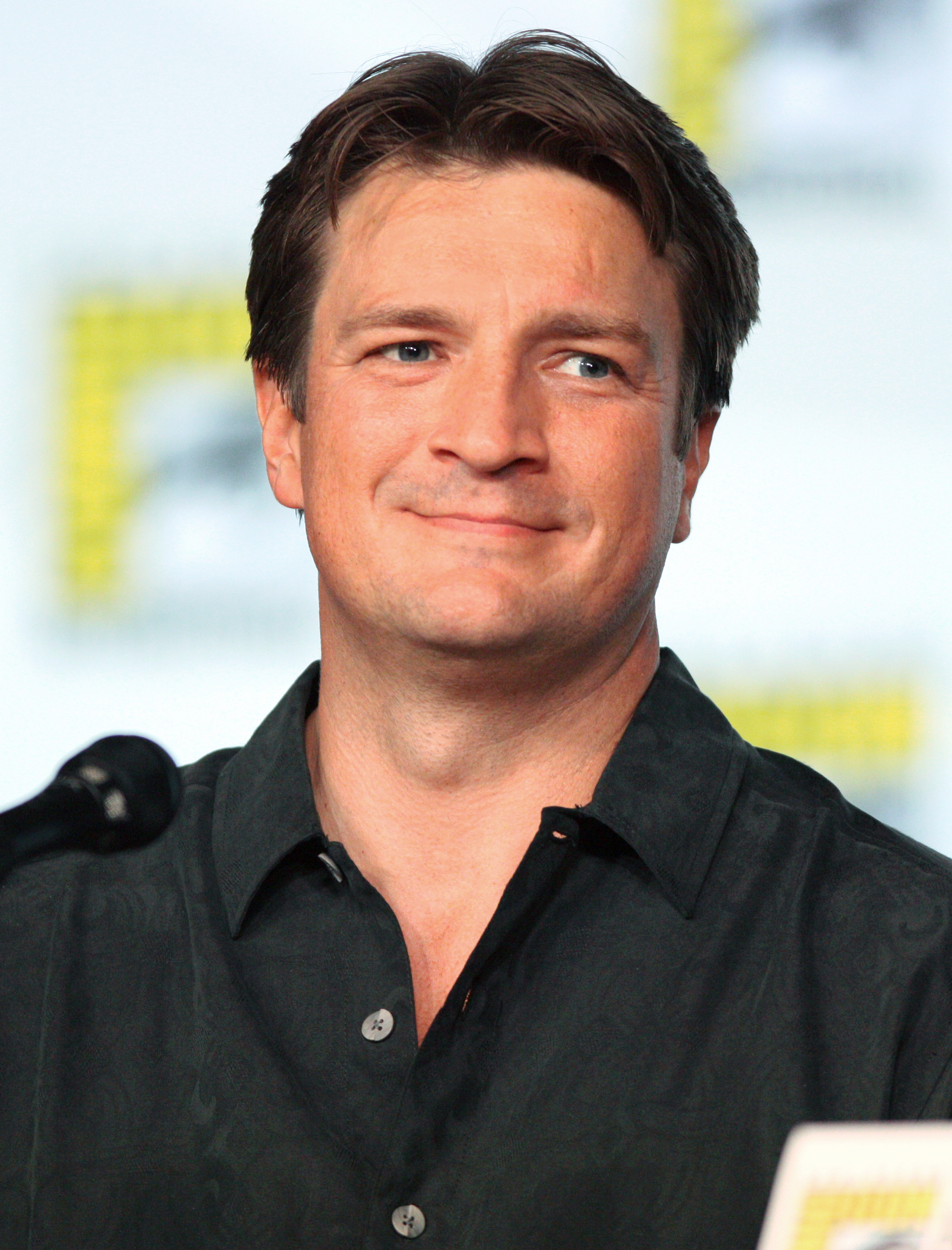
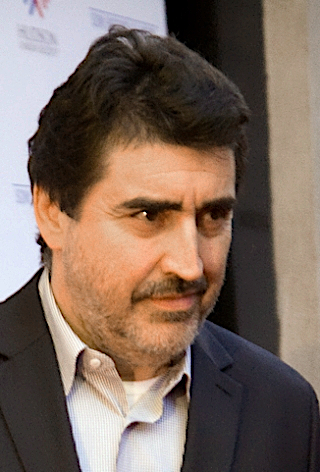
Billy Crystal, John Goodman, and Steve Buscemi (top) reprise their roles from Monsters, Inc. while Helen Mirren, Nathan Fillion, and Alfred Molina (bottom) play new characters.
- Billy Crystal as Michael "Mike" Wazowski
  - Noah Johnston as Young Mike
- John Goodman as James P. "Sulley" Sullivan
- Steve Buscemi as Randall "Randy" Boggs
- Peter Sohn as Scott "Squishy" Squibbles, an Oozma Kappa fraternity member.
- Joel Murray as Don Carlton, a middle-aged returning student and the founding member and president of Oozma Kappa fraternity.
- Sean P. Hayes and Dave Foley as Terri and Terry Perry, Oozma Kappa fraternity members who share each other's body
- Charlie Day as Art, an Oozma Kappa fraternity member.
- Helen Mirren as Dean Abigail Hardscrabble, the chair of the Scarer program and president at Monsters University.
- Alfred Molina as Professor Derek Knight, the "Scaring 101" professor for Hardscrabble's Scarer program.
- Tyler Labine as Brock Pearson, Greek Council vice-president who commentates the Scare Games with Claire.
- Nathan Fillion as Johnny J. Worthington III, president of Roar Omega Roar fraternity.
- Aubrey Plaza as Claire Wheeler, Greek Council President who commentates the Scare Games with Brock.
- Bobby Moynihan as Chet Alexander, a fraternity member and vice-president of Roar Omega Roar.
- Julia Sweeney as Sheri Squibbles, Scott's mother.
- Bonnie Hunt as Karen Graves, Mike's teacher.
- John Krasinski as "Frightening" Frank McCay, a scarer who inspires a young Mike to follow him into the profession.
- Bill Hader as a referee and a slug-like monster.
- Bob Peterson as Roz
- John Ratzenberger as The Yeti, a Monsters, Inc. mailroom employee.

Kelsey Grammer was originally announced to voice Henry J. Waternoose III in the film, replacing James Coburn from the original film due to his death in 2002. The character was ultimately cut from the film.

== Production ==
=== Development ===
==== Early development; Circle Seven Animation sequel ====
Plans for a second Monsters, Inc. film existed since 2002. Following disagreements between Disney CEO Michael Eisner and Pixar CEO Steve Jobs, Disney—which owned the rights to make sequels to all of Pixar's films up to and including Cars—announced that a sequel to Monsters, Inc. would be made by Disney's Circle 7 Animation studio, which was also working on early drafts of Toy Story 3 and Finding Nemo 2. Titled Monsters, Inc. 2: Lost in Scaradise, the film would have focused on Mike and Sulley visiting the human world to give Boo a birthday present, only to find that she had moved. After getting trapped in the human world, Mike and Sulley would split up after disagreeing on what to do. Screenwriters Rob Muir and Bob Hilgenberg were hired to write a script for the film, and storyboarded an early draft of it. Disney's change of management in late 2005—in which Eisner was replaced by Bob Iger led to renewed negotiations with Pixar, and in January 2006 Disney announced it had purchased the studio. The Disney-owned sequel rights were then transferred to Pixar, leading to the cancellation of Muir and Hilgenberg's version of the film and the subsequent closure of Circle 7.

==== Development as prequel ====
A Pixar-made follow-up was confirmed in 2010. The film was originally planned for release on November 16, 2012, but the release was moved up to November 2, 2012, to avoid competition with The Twilight Saga: Breaking Dawn – Part 2. On March 29, 2011, it was announced that the film would be a prequel and the title Monsters University was announced. On April 4, 2011, due to Pixar's past success with summer releases, according to a Disney executive it was confirmed that the film would be released on June 21, 2013.

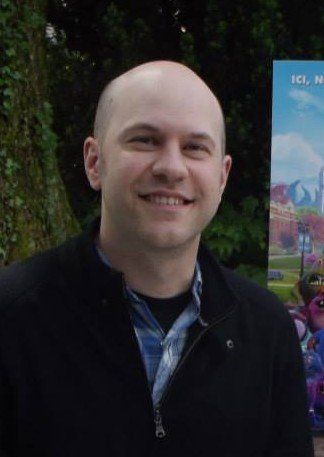
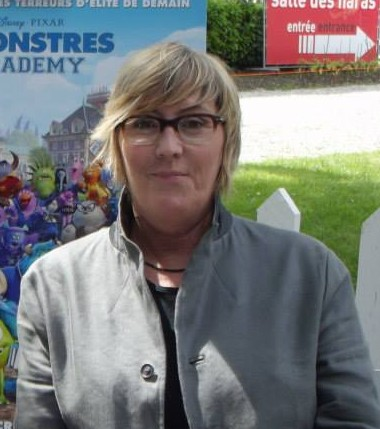
Director Dan Scanlon (left) and producer Kori Rae (right) screened the film at the 2013 Annecy International Animated Film Festival.

The feature was directed by Dan Scanlon and produced by Kori Rae. Billy Crystal, John Goodman, Steve Buscemi, Bob Peterson, and John Ratzenberger reprised their roles, and Bonnie Hunt voiced a new character. New voice castings included Dave Foley, Sean Hayes, Julia Sweeney, Helen Mirren, Alfred Molina, Peter Sohn, Charlie Day, Joel Murray, Nathan Fillion, Aubrey Plaza, Tyler Labine, John Krasinski, Bill Hader, Bobby Moynihan, and Beth Behrs.

The plot of Monsters University details Mike and Sulley's first meeting, contradicting a scene from the original film in which Mike tells Sulley "You've been jealous of my good looks since the fourth grade." Scanlon said he had a dilemma with this line during pre-production, but he believed it was best if Mike and Sulley meet in college because, "we wanted to see their relationship develop when they were adults. And we also felt like college is so much about self-discovery and figuring out who you are." He added, "It felt like the perfect place to do this, but we had that line. So we tried versions where they met young and then we skipped ahead to college. And we knew we didn't want to make Monsters Elementary." Scanlon said during pre-production that, "Pete Docter, the original director, and John Lasseter ... finally said to me, 'it's great that you're honoring that, but you have to do what's right for the story.' So we made a tough decision to just have them be in college and put that line aside." Scanlon joked that the line from the first film was "an old monster expression", saying, "That's what monsters always say to each other."

=== Animation ===
Monsters University is the first Pixar film that used global illumination, a new lighting system introduced as part of the overhaul of the rendering system used since the first Toy Story film. In the planning stage of the film director of photography, Jean-Claude Kalache, asked "What if we made these lights just work?" Before the new system, artists had to build reflections and shadows manually which became increasingly complex as the models and the setups became more technologically advanced. The new lighting system uses path tracing, a technique that imitates the behavior of the light in the real world; this automatized the process, delivered more realism, produced soft shadows, and let the artist spend more time on models and complex scenes – some of which contained thousands of light sources.

For research, the filmmakers visited several colleges and universities in the U.S. and Canada, including Harvard University, Stanford University, Cornell University, and the Massachusetts Institute of Technology, observing college architecture, student life, Greek organizations, and the teaching methods of professors and faculty. To research fraternity life, which is central to the film, many of the film's producers spent several weeks at a fraternity house. Researchers also attended a "Bonfire Rally" at Berkeley in anticipation of the Big Game, a rivalry football game between the university and Stanford.

== Music ==
The music for the film is Randy Newman's seventh collaboration with Pixar as composer, who also previously scored Monsters, Inc. Walt Disney Records released the soundtrack on June 18, 2013.

The songs "Main Title", "Rise and Shine", and "The Scare Games" feature the drum line from the Blue Devils group "BD Entertainment". The recordings for the percussion tracks were done at Skywalker Ranch, and were written by Blue Devils percussion caption head Scott Johnson.

The songs "Ísland" by Mastodon and "Gospel" by MarchFourth Marching Band are featured during the film but do not appear on the soundtrack. The songs "Party Hard" by Andrew W.K. and "Kickstart My Heart" by Mötley Crüe are featured prominently in the teaser trailers but do not appear on the soundtrack or in the film.

== Release ==
=== Theatrical ===
The film had its worldwide premiere on June 5, 2013, as a special screening at BFI Southbank in London with the director and producer in attendance. The film had its Asian premiere as the opening film of the 2013 Shanghai International Film Festival on June 15, 2013. It premiered in the United States on June 8, 2013, at the Seattle International Film Festival, and was released in theaters on June 21, 2013. The film's theatrical release was accompanied by Pixar's short film The Blue Umbrella, directed by Saschka Unseld.

Aditionally, an animated short film titled Party Central, which takes place shortly after the events of Monsters University, premiered at the D23 Expo in late 2013 before being released theatrically with Muppets Most Wanted in 2014.

=== Marketing ===
The first teaser trailer for Monsters University was released on June 20, 2012. Four versions of the trailer exist; in his sleep, Mike mutters excuses to avoid attending class in each one, such as "I'm not wearing any clothes," "My homework ate my dog," "Class President?", and "My pony made the Dean's List." A second trailer was released on February 11, 2013, a third on April 26, 2013, and a fourth and final trailer, which included scenes from the film, was released on May 30, 2013.

On October 8, 2012, Pixar revealed a fully functional website for Monsters University, complete information about admissions, academic and campus life, and a campus store to purchase MU apparel. On April 1, 2013, the website was styled to appear as though a rival college, Fear Tech, had hacked and vandalized it. The first television commercial for the film was aired during the 2013 Rose Bowl Game, parodying advertisements for participating schools that are shown during college football telecasts. From June 27 until July 11, 2013, Disney's online game Club Penguin hosted a Monsters University Takeover event to promote the film. Players could dress up as their favorite monsters and take part in the Scare Games.

=== Home media ===
Monsters University was released by Walt Disney Studios Home Entertainment on Blu-ray, 3D Blu-ray, DVD, digital copy, and on demand on October 29, 2013. It was accompanied by The Blue Umbrella, Pixar's short film which played alongside the film in theaters. Its home video sales earned a revenue of $111 million with 5.5 million copies sold, making it the fourth best-selling title of 2013. Monsters University was released on 4K Blu-ray on March 3, 2020.

== Reception ==
=== Box office ===
Monsters University grossed $268.5 million in the United States and Canada and $475.1 million in other countries, for a worldwide total of $743.6 million. Calculating in all expenses, Deadline Hollywood estimated that the film made a profit of $179.8 million.

It became the 53rd highest-grossing film of all time, the 11th highest-grossing animated film of all time, the seventh-highest-grossing 2013 film, and the third-highest-grossing Pixar film. The film earned $136.9 million worldwide on its opening weekend. Disney declined to provide a budget for the film; Entertainment Weekly speculated that it was higher than that of Brave ($185 million), mainly because of the high cost of John Goodman and Billy Crystal reprising their roles. Shockya and EOnline reported the budget to be $200 million—on par with previous Pixar films.

==== North America ====
In the week leading to Monsters University's release, Disney projected an opening-weekend gross of at least $70 million. The film opened on Friday, June 21, 2013, across 4,004 theaters in first place with $30.47 million—including $2.6 million in 20:00 Thursday night shows—marking the fifth-largest opening day among animated films. The film then reached first place with an opening-weekend gross of $82.43 million; the second-largest among Pixar films, the second-largest among G-rated films, the fourth-largest among prequels, the fifth-largest among animated films, and the fifth-largest among films released in June. Monsters University outgrossed newcomers White House Down and The Heat to remain at first place on its second weekend, declining 45% to $45.6 million. Facing tough competition from Despicable Me 2 on its third weekend, it dropped 57% to $19.7 million. As of December 2013, it is the tenth-highest-grossing animated film.

==== Outside North America ====
The film earned $54.5 million in 35 markets on its opening weekend. It set a Pixar opening-weekend record in Latin America with revenues of $31.7 million. In Argentina, the film set an opening-weekend record among all films with $5.49 million. In Australia, where it had a simultaneous release with Despicable Me 2, Monsters University debuted behind the latter with $3.56 million in third place. In Hong Kong, the film set opening-day (HK$5.03 million), single-day (HK$7.93 million) and opening-weekend (HK$25.79 million) records among animated films, beating the previous record holder, Toy Story 3. In the UK, the film topped the box office during its opening weekend with a gross of £3.46 million. The film's largest opening occurred in China, where its $13 million debut ranked fourth among Disney films. The film's highest-grossing markets are Japan ($90.1 million), the UK, Ireland, and Malta ($47.2 million), and Mexico ($37.6 million).

=== Critical response ===
Review aggregation website Rotten Tomatoes gives the film a score of 80% based on 200 reviews with an average rating of 6.8/10. The site's critical consensus reads "Offering Monsters, Inc. fans a welcome return visit with beloved characters, Monsters University delivers funny and thoughtful family entertainment for viewers of any age." Another review aggregator, Metacritic, which assigns a rating out of 100 top reviews from mainstream critics, calculated a score of 65 based on 41 reviews, indicating "generally favorable" reviews. Audiences polled by CinemaScore gave the film an average grade of "A" on an A+ to F scale. According to Disney, audiences were 56% female and 60% below the age of 25. Families made up 73% of business, and teens accounted for 15%. The film played well with all ages.

Matt Zoller Seitz of Chicago Sun-Times gave the film four stars out of four, saying it "is true to the spirit of [Monsters, Inc.] and matches its tone. But it never seems content to turn over old ground." Trevor Johnston of Time Out gave the film four stars out of five, writing "It has enough of the right stuff to haunt the imagination long after the immediate buzz of its fluffy-furred cuteness has melted away. For a mere prequel, that's a result." Steven Rea of The Philadelphia Inquirer gave the film three stars out of four and said it "is cute, and funny, and the animation, though not exactly inspired, is certainly colorful." Jake Coyle of Associated Press gave the film three stars out of four, saying it "might not be as gifted as some of its other movies, but sometimes it's alright to be OK." Peter Travers of Rolling Stone gave the film three stars out of four, and said "It's all infectious fun despite the lack of originality. In the art of tickling funny bones, Crystal and Goodman earn straight A's." Richard Corliss of Time gave the film a positive review, saying "This minor film with major charms still deserves to have kids dragging their parents to the multiplex for one more peek at the monsters in the closet. With Pixar, familiarity breeds content." Bill Goodykoontz of The Arizona Republic gave the film three-and-a-half stars out of five and said it is "one of those movies that has absolutely no reason to exist, but once you've seen it, you're kind of glad it does." Alan Scherstuhl of The Village Voice gave the film a positive review, saying "Monsters University feels not like the work of artists eager to express something but like that of likable pros whose existence depends on getting a rise out the kids. It's like the scares Sully and Mike spring on those sleeping tykes: technically impressive but a job un-anchored to anything more meaningful."

Leonard Maltin of IndieWire praised the animation and art direction, but wrote that he wished "the movie was funnier and wasn't so plot-heavy" and that "Pixar has raised the bar for animated features so high that when they turn out a film that's merely good instead of great they have only themselves to blame for causing critics to damn them with faint praise." Michael Phillips of Chicago Tribune gave the film two stars out of four saying "Monsters University, the weirdly charmless sequel to the animated 2001 Pixar hit Monsters, Inc., is no better or worse than the average (and I mean average) time-filling sequel cranked out by other animation houses." Todd McCarthy of The Hollywood Reporter gave the film a negative review, saying that it "never surprises, goes off in unexpected directions or throws you for a loop in the manner of the best Pixar stories. Nor does it come close to elating through the sheer imagination of its conceits and storytelling." Claudia Puig of USA Today gave the film three stars out of four, and said it "may not be as inventive as Inc., but it's an amusing and amiable addition to Pixar's roster of animated coming-of-age stories." Michael O'Sullivan of The Washington Post gave the film three stars out of four, saying "It may be children's terror that powers the movie's fictional universe, but it's the energy of its stars that lights up Monsters University." Chris Nashawaty of Entertainment Weekly gave the film an A− and said it "is exactly the rebound Pixar needed after 2011's Cars 2 left some wondering if the studio had lost its magic. The delightful story of when Mike met Sulley puts those concerns to rest." James Berardinelli of ReelViews gave the film three stars out of four and wrote "Although it falls short of the best Pixar has brought to the screen over its long association with Disney, it's nevertheless worth a trip to the theater, especially for kids."

Not all reviews were positive. Richard Roeper gave the film a C+, saying "This is a safe, predictable, edge-free, nearly bland effort from a studio that rarely hedges its bets." Stephen Whitty of Newark Star-Ledger gave the film two-and-a-half stars out of four and said "The artwork is accomplished, and intricate. The G-rating is genuine, without any gross-out gags. And there's none of the usual winks to the adults with tired, pop-culture references." Manohla Dargis of The New York Times gave the film two-and-a-half stars out of five and wrote "Both the originality and stirring emotional complexity of Monsters, Inc., with its exquisitely painful and touching parallels with the human world, are missing." Ty Burr of The Boston Globe gave the film two-and-a-half stars out of four, and said "This is not a bad movie, and to small children it will be a very good one, but it's closer to average than one would wish from the company that gave us Up, WALL-E, The Incredibles, and the Toy Story series." Rene Rodriguez of Miami Herald gave the film two stars out of five and wrote that it "feels half-hearted and lazy, like they weren't even trying. At least show a little effort, guys."

=== Accolades ===
Monsters University marks the first Pixar film not to be nominated for either an Academy Award or a Golden Globe Award.

Awards
Award	Date of ceremony	Category	Recipients	Result
American Cinema Editors	February 7, 2014	Best Edited Animated Feature Film	Greg Snyder	Nominated
Annie Awards	February 1, 2014	Best Animated Feature		Nominated
Annie Awards	February 1, 2014	Animated Effects in an Animated Production		Nominated
Annie Awards	February 1, 2014	Character Animation in an Animated Feature Production	John Chun Chiu Lee	Nominated
Annie Awards	February 1, 2014	Character Design in an Animated Feature Production	Chris Sasaki	Nominated
Annie Awards	February 1, 2014	Music in an Animated Feature Production	Randy Newman	Nominated
Annie Awards	February 1, 2014	Production Design in an Animated Feature Production	Ricky Nierva, Robert Kondo, Daisuke "Dice" Tsutsumi	Nominated
Annie Awards	February 1, 2014	Voice Acting in an Animated Feature Production	Billy Crystal (Mike Wazowski)	Nominated
Annie Awards	February 1, 2014	Writing in an Animated Feature Production	Daniel Gerson, Robert L. Baird, Dan Scanlon	Nominated
Annie Awards	February 1, 2014	Storyboarding in an Animated Feature Production	Dean Kelly	Won
Annie Awards	February 1, 2014	Editorial in an Animated Feature Production	Greg Snyder, Gregory Amundson, Steve Bloom	Won
British Academy Film Awards	February 16, 2014	Best Animated Film	Dan Scanlon	Nominated
Cinema Audio Society Awards	February 22, 2014	Outstanding Achievement in Sound Mixing for Motion Pictures – Animated	Doc Kane, Michael Semanick, Gary Summers, David Boucher, Corey Tyler	Nominated
Critics' Choice Movie Award	January 16, 2014	Best Animated Feature		Nominated
Denver Film Critics Society	January 13, 2014	Best Animated Feature Film		Nominated
Hollywood Film Awards	October 21, 2013	Hollywood Animation Award		Won
International Cinephile Society	February 23, 2014	Best Animated Film		Nominated
Kids' Choice Awards	March 29, 2014	Favorite Animated Movie		Nominated
Kids' Choice Awards	March 29, 2014	Favorite Voice from an Animated Movie	Billy Crystal	Nominated
Producers Guild of America Award	January 19, 2014	Outstanding Producer of Animated Theatrical Motion Pictures	Kori Rae	Nominated
San Francisco Film Critics Circle	December 15, 2013	Best Animated Feature		Nominated
Satellite Awards	February 23, 2014	Best Motion Picture, Animated or Mixed Media		Nominated
Saturn Award	June 2014	Best Animated Film		Nominated
Visual Effects Society Awards	February 12, 2014	Outstanding Animation in an Animated Feature Motion Picture	Kori Rae, Sanjay Bakshi, Jon Reisch, Scott Clark	Nominated
Visual Effects Society Awards	February 12, 2014	Outstanding Created Environment in an Animated Feature Motion Picture	Robert Kondo, Eric Andraos, Dale Ruffolo, Peter Sumanaseni (Campus)	Nominated
Washington D.C. Area Film Critics Association	December 9, 2013	Best Animated Feature		Nominated
