= Presto =

Presto may refer to:

== Computing ==
- Presto (browser engine), an browser engine previously used in the Opera web browser
- Presto (operating system), a Linux-based OS by Xandros
- Presto (SQL query engine), a distributed query engine
- Presto (animation software), the in-house proprietary 3D animation software created and used by Disney and Pixar

== Music ==
- Presto (music), a fast tempo marking
- Presto (album), a 1989 album by Rush
- "Presto" (rapper) (1992–2024), a German rapper
- "Presto" (song), by No Money Enterprise, 2020
- Presto! Recording Studios, a studio in Nebraska, United States

== Companies and organizations ==
- Presto (restaurant technology platform)
- Presto (streaming company), an Australian streaming company
- Presto (UK supermarket), a grocery chain in the UK that operated from the 1960s to 1998
- Presto! Recording Studios, in Lincoln, Nebraska
- Presto Studios, a computer game development company
- National Presto Industries, manufacturer of kitchen appliances
- Great Taste Coffee Makers, a.k.a. Presto, a Philippine Basketball Association team
- Presto AB, a Swedish manufacturer and international reseller of protection against fire and accidents.

== Transportation ==
- Presto, later name of the tug Empire Sara
- Rinspeed Presto, a Swiss concept car
- Hyundai Excel, a car also known as the Hyundai Presto in South Korea
- Presto card, a smart card payment system used in Ontario

== Other uses ==
- Presto (film), a 2008 short film by Pixar
- Presto, Bolivia, a town in Bolivia
- Presto, Pennsylvania, an unincorporated community in the United States
- Presto!, an ATM network owned by Publix Super Markets
- Presto, a pseudonym of Jonathan Swift; see Chelsea Bun House
- Earl "Presto" Johnson, American magician
- Alice S. Presto, American suffragist and politician
