= Dime museum =

19th-c. centers for the working class

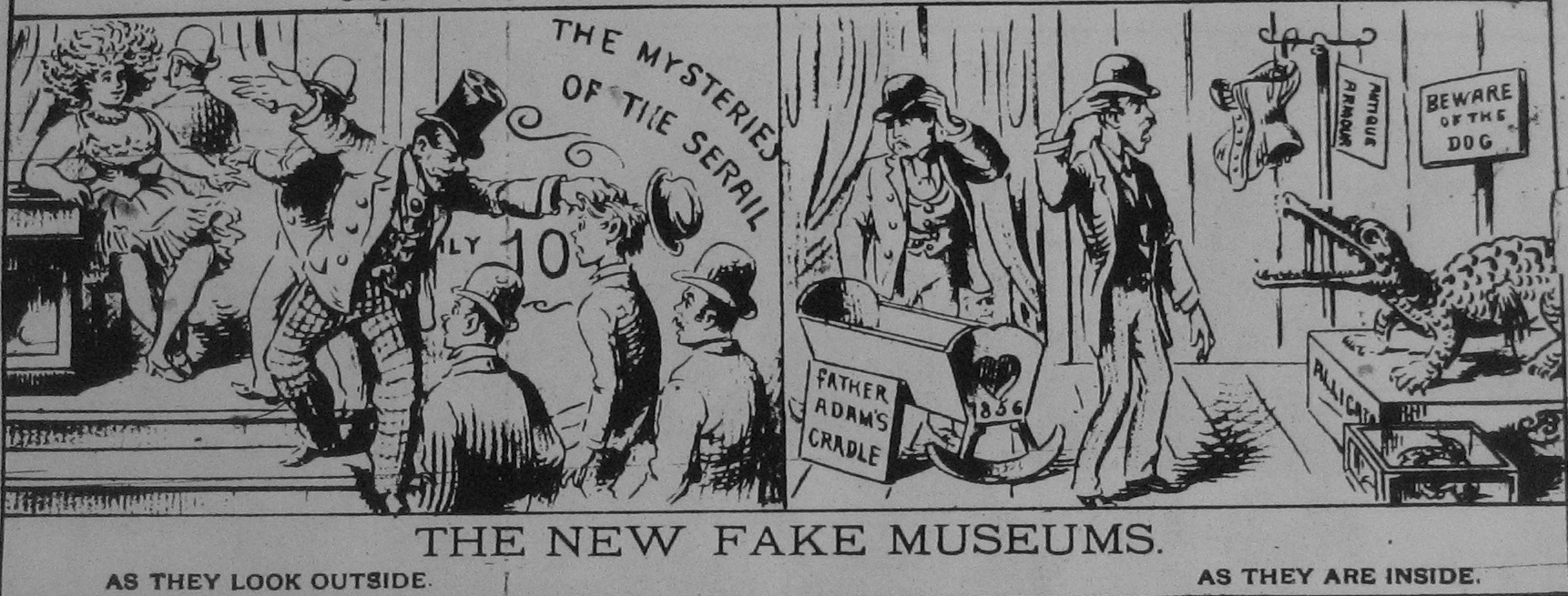
"The New Fake Museums" – 1889 cartoon suggesting that some dime museums were little more than scams

Dime museums were establishments that grew in popularity starting from 1870 that were used to display freak show performers, human anatomy exhibitions, dioramas, oddities, and moral lectures to the general public. These institutions peaked in popularity at the end of the 19th century all throughout the United States. Designed as centers for entertainment and moral education for the working class (lowbrow), the museums were distinctly different from upper middle class cultural events (highbrow). In urban centers like New York City, where many immigrants settled, dime museums were popular and cheap entertainment. The social trend reached its peak during the Progressive Era (c. 1890–1920). Although lowbrow entertainment, they were the starting places for the careers of many notable vaudeville-era entertainers, including Harry Houdini, Lew Fields, Joe Weber, the Griffin Sisters, and Maggie Cline.

== History ==
Dime museums arose during a unique time in American history. Urban areas were becoming more economically and racially diverse. The new working and middle class needed new forms of entertainment due to increased leisure time from advances in labor production. Dime museums became a popular form of mass entertainment.

Dime museums took on trends from now controversial freak shows. Freak shows trace their origins to early 19th-century Europe. Freak shows were also a form of mass entertainment; however, they frequently took advantage of the people they put on display. They used non-Western and physically abnormal individuals as spectacles, often accentuating exoticism, stereotypes, fetishes, and exclusionary hierarchies.

Dime museums were not strictly for a specific group since they were open to anyone who could afford the entrance fee. They were a place where people could enjoy wild entertainment while also learning due to the educational front these museums displayed. Dime museums eventually fell out of style once other forms of entertainment began to rise in popularity. Amusement parks, higher-quality films, and vaudeville (a form of theatrical entertainment). These forms of entertainment were refreshing to audiences who had grown accustomed to contents within dime museums. By World War I, dime museums existed only as memory.

== Baltimore ==
In Baltimore, Maryland, the Peale Museum is credited as one of the first dime museums in the country. This type of attraction was re-created in the American Dime Museum in 1999, which operated for eight years before closing permanently and auctioning off its exhibits in late February 2007.

== Boston ==
Kimball's Museum and Austin & Stones Museum in Scollay Square were both well-known attractions, the former having a friendly connection to, and sometimes competition with, P. T. Barnum. Barnum and Moses Kimball even shared "Fee Gee Mermaids" on a regular basis.

== Chicago ==
In 1882, C. E. Kohl and Middleton opened their first Dime Museum in Chicago. It was located at 150 West Madison Street, east of Halsted.

In 1883 they opened a new one at 150 S. Clark Street, near Madison (now 10 South Clark Street) and a third one at 150 W. Madison, opposite Union street.

== Cincinnati ==
Both John James Audubon and sculptor Hiram Powers produced displays for the Western Museum, organized by Dr Daniel Drake in 1818 and continued by Joseph Dorfeuille. "Satan and his Court" wax figures with moving parts and glowing eyes are typical of these displays.

== New Orleans ==
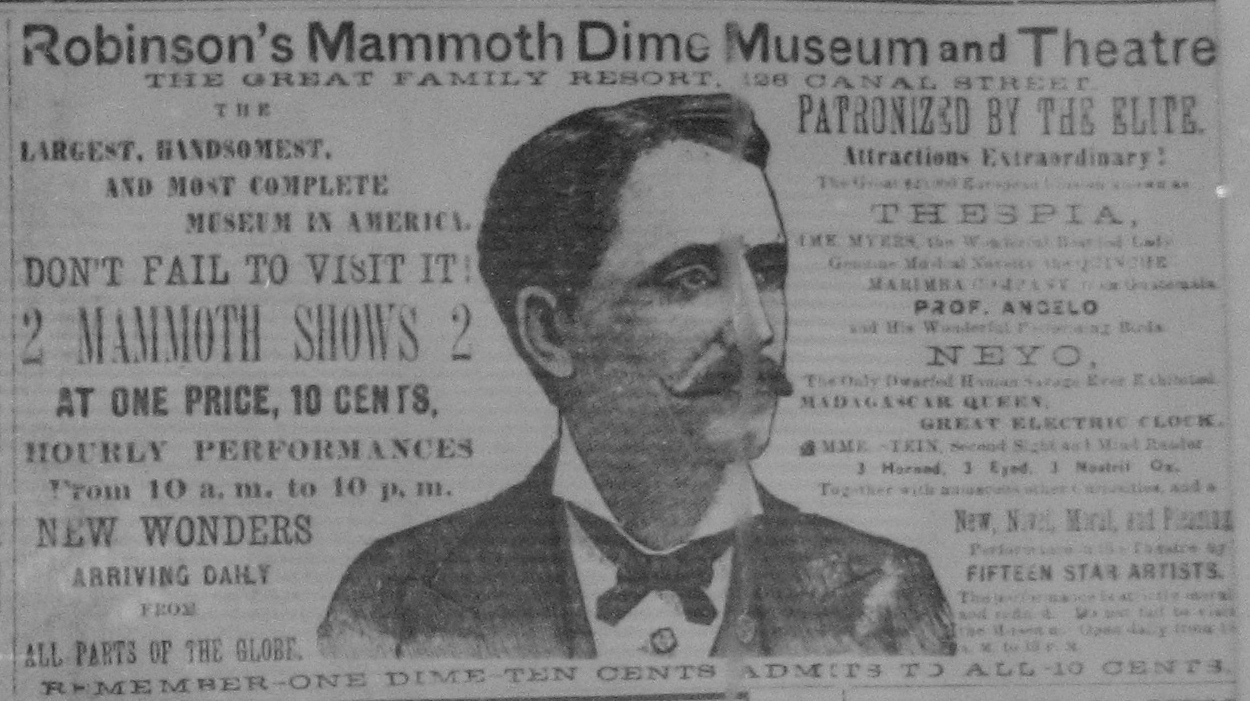
1885 advertisement for Robinson's Dime Museum and Theatre

On Canal Street, "Eugene Robinson's Museum and Theater" featured entertainment on the hour and also presented some of its attractions on a nearby riverboat. The common promotion gimmick of a brass band at the front entrance of these Dime Museums featured some of the earliest documented traditional jazz; Robinson's riverboat museum also hired Papa Jack Laine.

== New York City ==
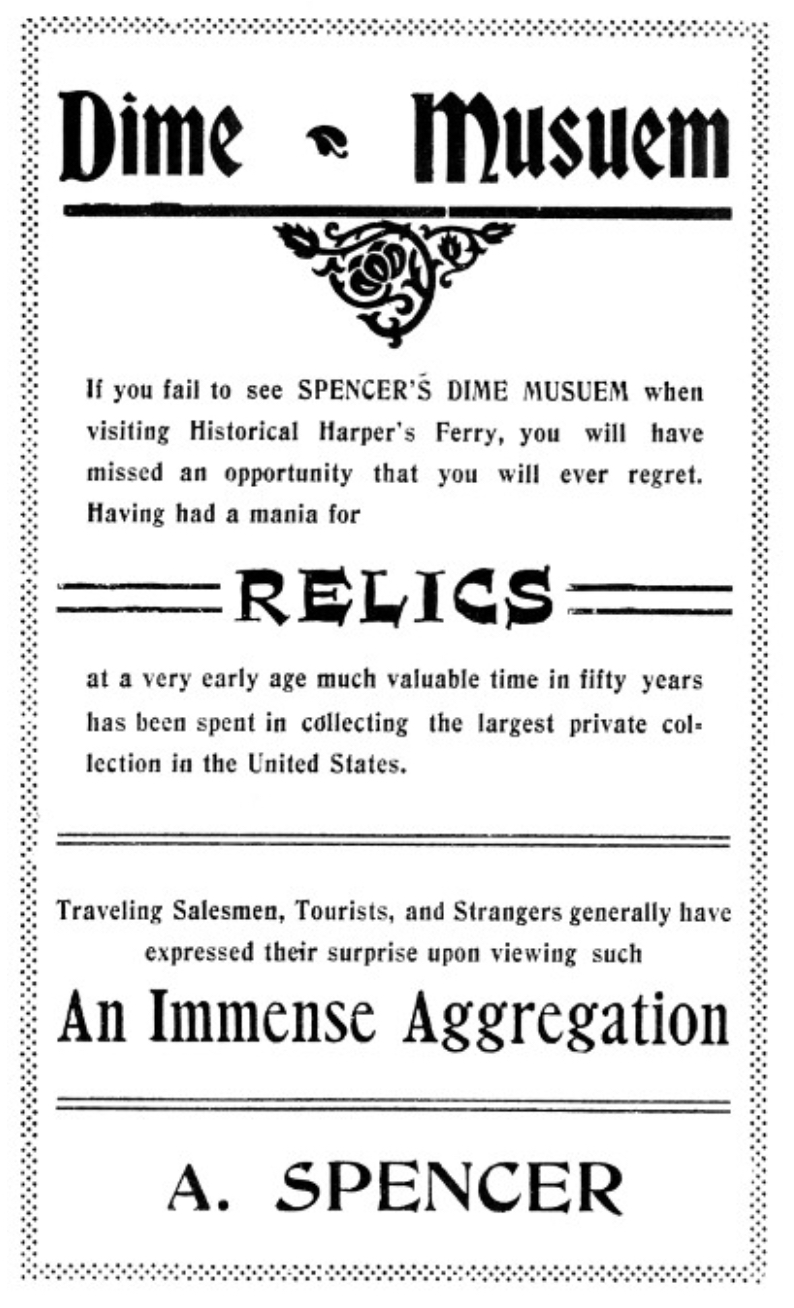
Advertisement for Dime Museum, Harpers Ferry, West Virginia, 1903

P. T. Barnum purchased Scudder's Dime Museum in 1841 and transformed it into one of the more popular single cultural sites that has existed, Barnum's American Museum. Together, P.T. Barnum and Moses Kimball introduced the so-called "Edutainement", which was a moralistic education realized through sensational freak shows, theater and circus performances, and many other means of entertainment. The first incarnation "American Museum" on Ann Street burned down on 13 July, 1865. It was relocated further up Broadway, but this venue too, fell victim to fire on 3 March, 1868.

=== Hubert's Museum ===
From 1925 through the 1960s, Hubert's Museum was located at 234 West 42nd Street in Times Square in New York City. It was located in the basement of the Playland Arcade. The site had previously been the location of Murray's Roman Gardens, a lobster palace.

Hubert's Museum featured a flea circus as well acts such as half-man half-woman Alberto Alberta and a variety of other performers, including the magician Earl "Presto" Johnson. The museum was documented in photography by Diane Arbus.

Later, in Times Square, mouse pitchman Tommy Laird opened a dime museum that featured Tisha Booty – "the Human Pin Cushion" – and several magicians, including Lou Lancaster, Criss Capehart, Dorothy Dietrich, Dick Brooks, and others.

== San Francisco ==
One of the longest running dime museums in San Francisco was the Pacific Museum of Anatomy and Natural Science. One of the first exhibits at the museum featured a preserved head of Joaquin Murietta. Joaquin Murrieta was a famous Mexican outlaw who fought against Western dominance and expansion. Dime museums also focused on differences between peoples' bodies, including bodies that transgressed gendered and racialized expectations. In 1895, Milton B. Matson, a transgender crossdresser was arrested in San Francisco for suspected fraud and eventually began working at a local dime museum. Having been offered a position by Frank Clifton (a dime museum manager), Matson, out of necessity for work and money, took up the job of sitting upon a platform while wearing men's clothing.

San Francisco was also home to the Museum of Living Wonders and Woodward's Gardens. These were located on Kearny Street and in the Mission district respectively.
