= Doug Sweetland =

American animator and filmmaker (born 1974)

- Sweetland in 2026
- Born: State College, Pennsylvania, U.S.
- Occupations: Animator; filmmaker
- Years active: 1994–present
- Employer: Pixar Animation Studios (1994–2010)

Doug Sweetland is an American animator and filmmaker. He wrote and directed the Pixar short film Presto (2008), which was nominated for the Academy Award for Best Animated Short Film.

== Career ==
After he graduated from the high school in 1992, he attended California Institute of the Arts, during the first class in first year, he was a student of a veteran animator, Corny Cole who worked for Chuck Jones, and Pink Panther cartoons and his classmates also become fellow staffs who worked with him at Pixar, including Jill Culton, Colin Brady, Mark Oftedal, Matthew Luhn, and Perry Farinola.

At some point during a second year, his sessions at the college were shut down during the 1994 Northridge earthquake, during that time he also met Pete Docter who interested to hired him at Pixar.

In 1994, Sweetland joined Pixar after graduated from California Institute of the Arts which Sweetland attended in 1992. His first assignment was as an animator on Toy Story. He continued as animator on A Bug's Life, and Toy Story 2. He was nominated for an Annie Award for Outstanding Individual Achievement for Character Animation for the film.

Sweetland was awarded Annie Awards for Outstanding Individual Achievement in Character Animation for Monsters, Inc. and Finding Nemo. He was supervising animator on Bud Luckey's Boundin' and worked as an animator and storyboard artist on The Incredibles. Sweetland followed this being supervising animator on John Lasseter's Cars.

In 2007, Sweetland pitched a short film about a sympathetic magician who gets "dumped" by his rabbit. This eventually evolved into a more slapstick film (and a throwback to Warner Bros. Entertainment's classic Looney Tunes). Teddy Newton was brought on board to design the characters; it emerged as Sweetland's directorial debut, Presto, which preceded WALL-E in theaters. It was nominated in 2008 for the Academy Award for Best Animated Short Film. It was included in the Animation Show of Shows in 2008. After finishing Presto, Sweetland left Pixar in 2009.

On September 24, 2010, it was reported that Sweetland had been hired by Sony Pictures Animation to direct an animated film adaptation of The Familiars novel series; that project has been cancelled. In January 2013, Warner Bros. Pictures developed the animated feature film Storks under their newly created Warner Animation Group banner, conceived and written by Nicholas Stoller and directed by Sweetland. In April 2015, Warner Bros. announced that the film, which Sweetland co-directed with Stoller, would be released on September 23, 2016.

== Filmography ==
- Toy Story (1995) (animator)
- A Bug's Life (1998) (animator)
- Toy Story 2 (1999) (animator)
- Monsters, Inc. (2001) (directing animator)
- Finding Nemo (2003) (animator)
- Boundin' (2003) (lead animator, short film)
- The Incredibles (2004) (animator, storyboard artist)
- Cars (2006) (supervising animator)
- Ratatouille (2007) (pixar productions)
- The Pixar Story (2007) (as himself)
- Presto (2008) (director, writer, voice actor (as Alec Azam, Presto DiGiotagione), animator (uncredited), short film)
- Tracy (2009) (actor (as Mike Warren))
- Toy Story 3 (2010) (fix and additional animator)
- Windy Day (2013) (layout, supervising animator, editor, voice actor (as Other Forest Creatures), short film)
- Storks (2016) (director, additional voices)
- Pigeon Toady's Guide to Your New Baby (2016) (director, short film)
