= Valerie LaPointe =

American storyboard artist and director (born 1981)

- Born: August 4, 1981 (age 45); Norfolk, Virginia, U.S.
- Education: Virginia Commonwealth University (BFA); University of Southern California (MFA)
- Occupations: Storyboard artist; director; animator; voice actor
- Years active: 2006–present
- Spouse: Matthew Luhn
- Children: 2

Valerie LaPointe (born August 4, 1981) is an American director and storyboard artist for Pixar Animation Studios.

== Early life ==
LaPointe was born in Norfolk, Virginia. When she was in the third grade, she watched The Little Mermaid (1989), and began drawing the character Ariel. "It really struck a chord and inspired me," LaPointe said, "I kind of became fixated on everything about it." At eight years old, she decided being an animator was her career goal. Her family moved to Kempsville. When she was 12, she wrote a letter addressed to Walt Disney Pictures with a pitch idea for a film. The studio mailed back, stating that they don't accept outside pitches, but they sent her an information packet of recommended art schools and their curriculum programs.

In 1999, LaPointe enrolled at Virginia Commonwealth University (VCU). There, she produced a student film titled Night Life, which used watercolor paintings. She graduated in 2003 with a Bachelor of Fine Arts (BFA) degree, majoring in communication arts and design. Subsequently, she received a Jacob K. Javits Fellowship from the United States Department of Education. A VCU professor encouraged her to pursue a Master's degree, in which she later enrolled in the School of Cinematic Studies at the University of Southern California (USC). During her graduate studies, she created a stop motion student film titled Lolly's Box, which was screened at the Annecy International Animation Film Festival. It became one of the top eight finalists for the 2006 Student Academy Awards.

== Career ==
In 2006, LaPointe became an apprentice story artist for Pixar's inaugural story internship program; she was in a class with eight other interns, including Adrian Molina. She graduated from USC in 2007 with a Master of Fine Arts (MFA), and was hired as a full-time employee for Pixar. Her first official project as a storyboard artist was the 2008 short film Presto. She later worked on the Mater's Tall Tales and Toy Story Toons series, such as Small Fry (2011) and Partysaurus Rex (2012). She moved up to feature-length films, which included Brave (2012), Inside Out (2015), and The Good Dinosaur (2015).

In 2016, LaPointe joined the production team for Toy Story 4 (2019). Admittedly, she felt Toy Story 3 (2010) provided the essential closure to the series. However, she listened to director Josh Cooley's pitch for the film, in which Bo Peep was to be the focal character. She stated, "...then I perked up and thought, 'Okay. Yeah. I could see this being a really good reason to make this.'" She was made the story supervisor, in which she supervised a team of storyboard artists to retool Bo Peep, a minor love interest in the first two Toy Story installments, into a confident feminist heroine. Additionally, LaPointe came up with the idea of the film's antagonist Gabby Gabby. She explained, "I really wanted to have a girl baby doll character in the Toy Story universe [to have] more female toy characters in general. But also, why was there never a baby doll? It's so signature of every little girl." For her work on Toy Story 4, she was credited as one of the eight story writers.

By the end of 2018, the Toy Story 4 story team was approached to produce an animated spin-off short film. LaPointe pitched a short film based on Bo Peep, adapting story ideas that were cut from Toy Story 4. She remembered: "I think the biggest looming question was what happened in that space and time because in Toy Story 4 we see Bo being given away and then we pick back up with her, she is a lost toy ... We'd come up with a lot of ideas in the meantime: For me, it was a big mystery that we didn't have the screen time for in the feature, so it was just perfect for a short film." LaPointe was made the director of the film, later titled Lamp Life (2020), in which she did most of the writing and storyboarding. It was released on Disney+ on January 31, 2020.

In 2019, Variety named LaPointe as one of the top ten American animators to watch for. By 2023, an Inside Out television series was announced to be in development by Pixar for Disney+; the series was officially titled Dream Productions. It was announced to begin streaming on December 11, 2024, with LaPointe directing several episodes alongside Mike Jones and Austin Madison.

== Personal life ==
LaPointe is married to Matthew Luhn, and she has two daughters. She lives in Oakland, California.

== Filmography ==
=== Films ===
Year	Title	Writer	Story Supervisor	Story Artist	Producer	Voice Role	Notes
2009	Up	No	No	No	No	Additional; Voices	
2012	Brave	No	No	Additional	No		
2015	Inside Out	No	No	Yes	No		
2015	The Good Dinosaur	No	No	Yes	No		
2019	Toy Story 4	Original; Story	Yes	No	No		Story co-written with John Lasseter, Andrew Stanton, Josh Cooley, Stephany Folsom, Rashida Jones, Will McCormack and Martin Hynes
2020	Soul	No	No	No	Associate executive		
2024	Inside Out 2	No	No	No	Associate executive		

=== Shorts ===
Year	Title	Director	Writer	Story Artist	Editor	Producer	Voice Role	Notes
2003	Night Life	Yes	Yes	No	Yes	Yes		
2005	Upside Downed	Yes	Yes	No	Yes	Yes	Melina	
2005	Lolly's Box	Yes	Yes	No	Yes	Yes		
2007	Your Friend the Rat	No	No	No	No	No		2D ink and paint artist
2008	Presto	No	No	Yes	No	No		
2008–2010	Cars Toons: Mater's Tall Tales	No	No	Yes	No	No		Episodes 8–10
2009	George and A.J.	No	No	No	No	No	Cat Lady	
2011	Toy Story Toons: Small Fry	No	No	Additional	No	No		
2012	Toy Story Toons: Partysaurus Rex	No	No	Additional	No	No		
2020	Lamp Life	Yes	Yes	Yes	No	No		
2021	Sprite Fright	No	No	No	No	No	Ellie	

=== Television series ===
Year	Title	Director	Writer	Notes
2024	Dream Productions	Yes	Additional screenplay material	2 episodes
