= Charley Parkhurst =

American stagecoach driver, farmer, and rancher (1812–1879)

Charley Darkey Parkhurst
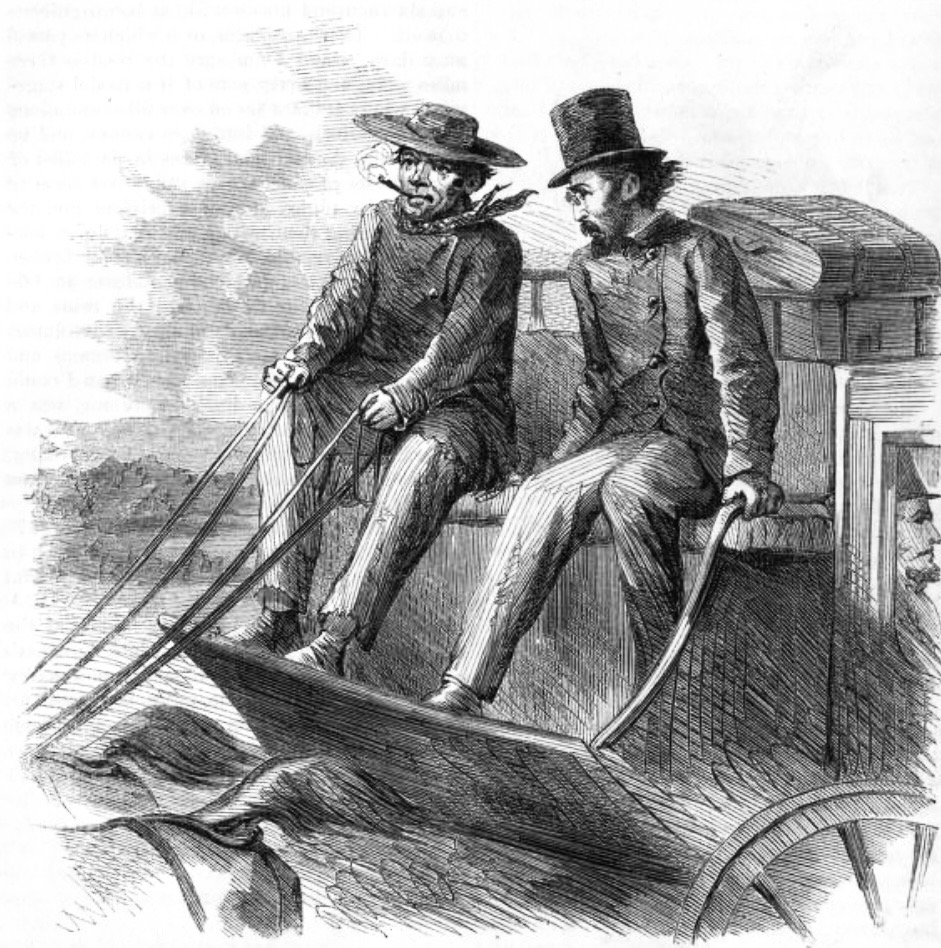
- 1865 illustration of "Old Charlie" Parkhurst (left) with the journalist J. Ross Browne.
- Born: January 17, 1812; Lebanon, New Hampshire
- Died: December 28, 1879 (aged 67); Watsonville, California
- Resting place: Pioneer Cemetery, Watsonville, California
- Occupations: Stagecoach driver, farmer, rancher

Charley Darkey Parkhurst (born Charlotte Darkey Parkhurst; January 17, 1812 – December 28, 1879) also known as "One-Eyed Charley" or "Six-Horse Charley", was an American stagecoach driver, farmer and rancher in California. Raised in New England and assigned female at birth, Parkhurst ran away as a youth, taking the name Charley. Now presenting as a man, he started work as a stable hand and learned to handle horses, including to drive coaches drawn by multiple horses. He worked in Massachusetts and Rhode Island, traveling to Georgia for associated work.

In his late 30s, Parkhurst sailed to California following the Gold Rush in 1849; there he became a noted stagecoach driver. In 1868, he may have been the first person who was assigned female at birth to vote in a presidential election in California. After his death in 1879, others discovered his sex, as well as that he had given birth at an earlier time.

== Life and career ==
Charley Parkhurst was born Charlotte Darkey Parkhurst January 17, 1812 in Lebanon, New Hampshire, to Mary (Morehouse) Parkhurst and Ebenezer Parkhurst. Parkhurst had two siblings, Charles D. (1811–1813) and Maria. His mother, Mary, died in 1812. Some time after Charles D. died, Charley and Maria were taken to an orphanage in Lebanon, New Hampshire. (Some sources say Charley was born there.) They were raised under the care of Mr. Millshark.

Parkhurst ran away from the orphanage at age 12, adopted the name Charley, and assumed a masculine presentation. According to one account, Parkhurst soon met Ebenezer Balch, who had a livery stable in Providence, Rhode Island. Balch took him under his care and returned to Rhode Island. Treating Parkhurst like a son, Balch taught him to work as a stable hand and gradually with the horses. He developed an aptitude with horses, and Balch taught him to drive a coach, first with one, then four, and eventually six horses. Parkhurst worked for Balch for several years. He may have gotten to know James E. Birch, who was a younger stagecoach driver in Providence.

In 1848, the 21-year-old Birch and his close friend Frank Stevens went to California during the Gold Rush to seek their fortunes. Birch soon began a stagecoach service, starting as a driver with one wagon. He gradually consolidated several small stage lines into the California Stage Company.

Seeking other opportunities as well, Parkhurst, in his late 30s, also left for California, sailing on the R. B. Forbes from Boston to Panama; travelers had to cross the isthmus overland and pick up other ships on the west coast. In Panama, Parkhurst met John Morton, returning to San Francisco where he owned a drayage business; Morton recruited the driver to work for him. Shortly after reaching California, Parkhurst lost the use of one eye after a kick from a horse, leading to his nickname of One Eyed Charley or Cockeyed Charley.

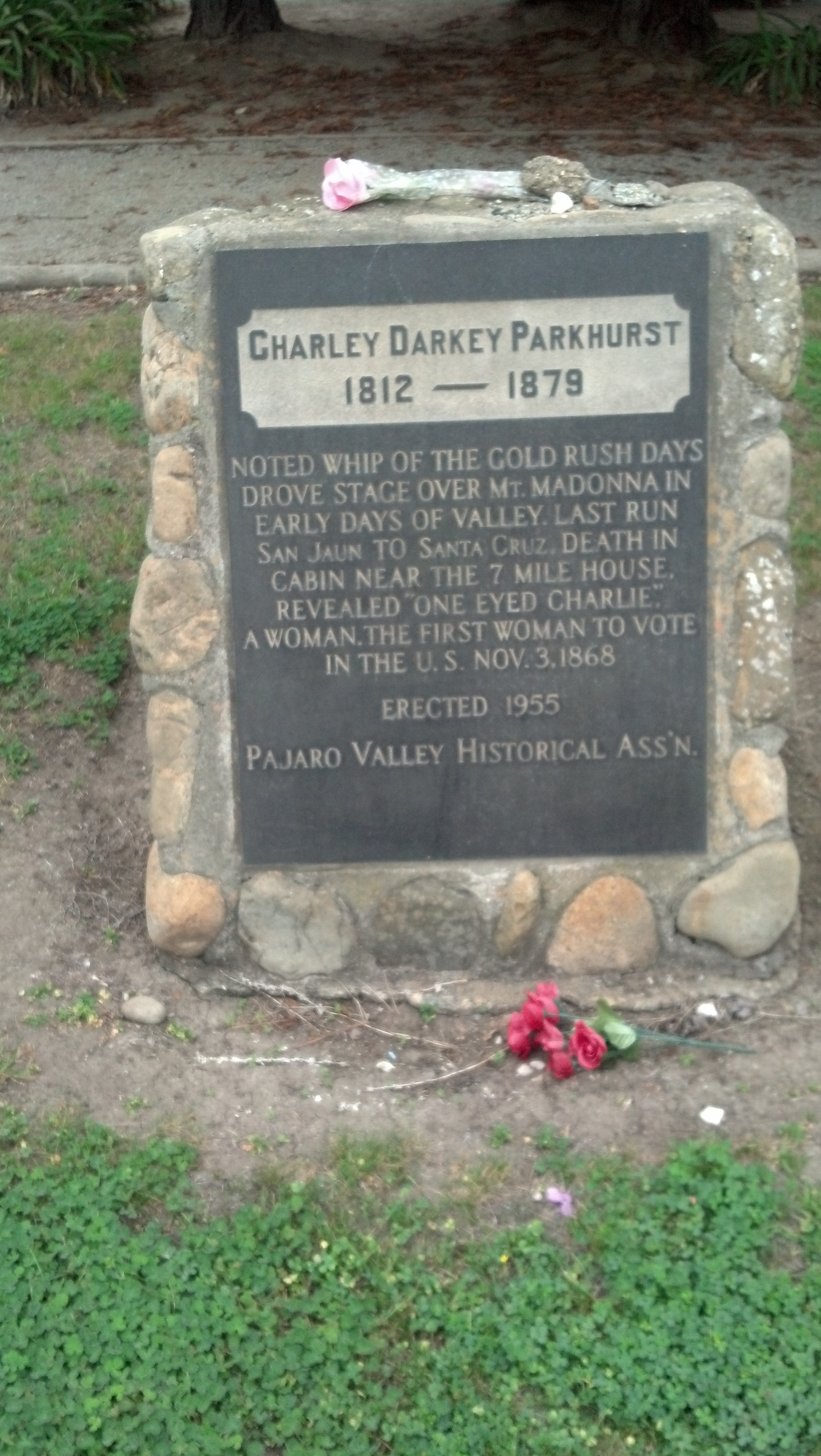
Parkhurst's headstone at the Pioneer Cemetery in Watsonville, California. Note the misspelling of "Jaun" (sic).

Later, Parkhurst went to work for Birch, where he developed a reputation as one of the finest stagecoach drivers (a "whip") on the West Coast. This inspired another nickname for him, Six-Horse Charley. He was ranked with "Foss, Hank Monk and George Gordon" as one of the top drivers of the time. Stagecoach drivers were also nicknamed "Jehus," after a Biblical passage in Kings 9:20: "… and the driving is like the driving of Jehu the son of Nimshi; for he driveth furiously."

Among Parkhurst's routes in northern California were Stockton to Mariposa, "the great stage route" from San Jose to Oakland, and San Juan to Santa Cruz. Stagecoach drivers carried mail as well as passengers, and had to deal with hold-up attempts, bad weather, and perilous, primitive trails. As historian Charles Outland described the era, "It was a dangerous era in a dangerous country, where dangerous conditions were the norm."

Seeing that railroads were cutting into the stagecoach business, Parkhurst retired from driving some years later to Watsonville, California. For fifteen years he worked at farming and lumbering in the winter. He also raised chickens in Aptos.

He later moved into a small cabin about six miles from Watsonville, and suffered from rheumatism in his later years. Parkhurst died there on December 28, 1879, due to tongue cancer.

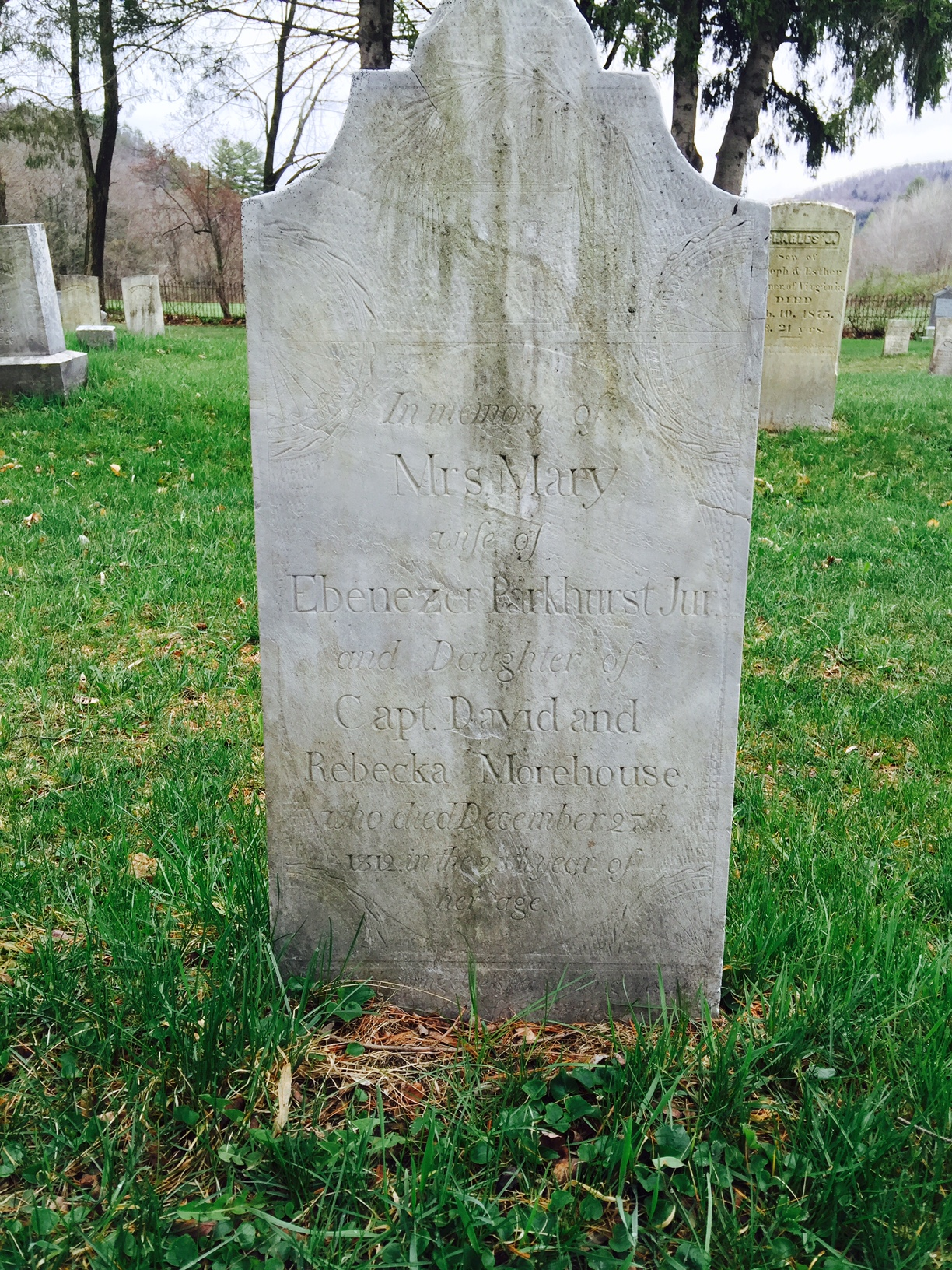
Tombstone of Mary Parkhurst, mother of Charley Parkhurst, and wife of Ebenezer Parkhurst. Location, Broad Brook Cemetery in Sharon, Vermont.

== Posthumous revelation ==
After Parkhurst died in 1879, neighbors came to the cabin to lay out the body for burial and discovered that his body appeared to be female. Rheumatism and cancer of the tongue were listed as causes of death. In addition, the examining doctor established that Parkhurst had given birth at some time. A trunk in the house contained a baby's dress. The LA Times reported that this discovery became a local sensation and was soon carried by national newspapers.

The obituary about Parkhurst from the San Francisco Call was reprinted in The New York Times on January 9, 1880, so the extraordinary driving career and the post-mortem discovery of Parkhurst's sex received national coverage. The headline was: "Thirty Years in Disguise: A Noted Old Californian Stage-Driver Discovered. After Death. To be a Woman."

He was in his day one of the most dexterous and celebrated of the famous California drivers ranking with Foss, Hank Monk, and George Gordon, and it was an honor to be striven for to occupy the spare end of the driver's seat when the fearless Charley Parkhurst held the reins of a four-or six-in hand ... Last Sunday [December 28, 1879], in a little cabin on the Moss Ranch, about six miles from Watsonville, Charley Parkhurst, the famous coachman, the fearless fighter, the industrious farmer and expert woodman died of the cancer on his tongue. He knew that death was approaching, but he did not relax the reticence of his later years other than to express a few wishes as to certain things to be done at his death. Then, when the hands of the kind friends who had ministered to his dying wants came to lay out the dead body of the adventurous Argonaut, a discovery was made that was literally astounding. Charley Parkhurst was a woman.

The article noted how unusual it was that Parkhurst could have lived so long with no one discovering his sex, and to "achieve distinction in an occupation above all professions calling for the best physical qualities of nerve, courage, coolness and endurance, and that she should add to them the almost romantic personal bravery that enables one to fight one's way through the ambush of an enemy ..." was seen to be almost beyond believing, but there was ample evidence to prove the case.

Parkhurst was not the only person to present differently from his assigned gender at birth. Other people such as Milton B. Matson, Eliza Hurd DeWolf, Nellie and Lizzie Brown, and Jeanne Bonnet were also individuals who presented as men in their regular lives despite being born as women.

== 1868 vote, legacy, and honors ==
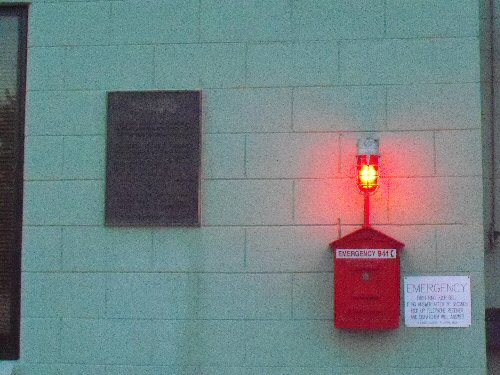
A plaque on the fire station in Soquel, California, marks the site where Parkhurst might have voted.

The Santa Cruz Sentinel of October 17, 1868, lists Charles Darkey Parkhurst on the official poll list for the election of 1868. There is no record that Parkhurst actually cast a vote.

Parkhurst has been variously interpreted as either a woman using a persona to be able to work and have freedoms that were not allowed for women during that time, or a transgender man or other figure in trans history. If Parkhurst did vote in 1868, he may have been the first person of the female sex to vote in a presidential election in California. Local legend and Parkhurst's gravestone claims that Parkhurst was "the first woman to vote in the U.S." and the fire station in Soquel, California, has a plaque reading:

The first ballot by a woman in an American presidential election was cast on this site November 3, 1868 by Charlotte (Charlie) Parkhurst who masqueraded as a man for much of her life. She was a stagecoach driver in the mother lode country during the gold rush days and shot and killed at least one bandit. In her later years she drove a stagecoach in this area. She died in 1879. Not until then was she found to be a woman. She is buried in Watsonville.

In 1955, the Pajaro Valley Historical Association erected a monument at Parkhurst's grave, which reads:

Noted whip of the gold rush days drove stage over Mt. Madonna in early days of Valley. Last run San Jaun to Santa Cruz. Death in cabin near the 7 mile house, revealed "One Eyed Charlie," a woman. The first woman to vote in the U.S. Nov. 3, 1868

In 2007, the Santa Cruz County Redevelopment Agency oversaw the completion of the Parkhurst Terrace Apartments, named for the stagecoach driver and located a mile along the old stage route from the place of his death.

== Representation in popular culture ==
- On March 13, 1958, during the sixth season of the television series Death Valley Days, the episode "Cockeyed Charlie Parkhurst" aired. It was loosely based on his life. It featured Frank Gerstle in the role of Parkhurst.
- In 1969, Janice Holt Giles had Charley Parkhurst as a character in the novel Six Horse Hitch, a historical fiction novel about stage coaching covering the period from 1859 to 1869.
- In 1999, Pam Muñoz Ryan wrote a fictionalized biography of Parkhurst's life for children, titled Riding Freedom. It is illustrated by Brian Selznick.
- In 2008, Fern J. Hill wrote a fictional memoir based on Parkhurst's life, Charley's Choice: The Life and Times of Charley Parkhurst.
- From 2009 to 2010, the Autry National Center of Los Angeles had a series of programs and events, entitled Out West, which included exhibits, lectures, films and other material about LGBT people's contributions to the Old West. Parkhurst was one of the individuals featured in this series.
- In 2012, Karen Kondazian wrote historical fiction novel, The Whip based loosely on Parkhurst's life.
- In 2019, an opera about Parkhurst's life premiered at the Cohen New Works Festival in the University of Texas at Austin. Good Country portrays Parkhurst's life in the California Gold Rush, based on written historical accounts, incorporating Old West slang and late 19th century clothing. The opera begins in the year 1849. The libretto was written by Cecelia Raker, and the musical score was composed by Keith Allegretti. The protagonist tenor role of Parkhurst can be considered the first opera composed with a trans man lead vocalist in mind. Over a dozen transgender opera singers around the world applied for the role. The role of Parkhurst was given to Holden Madagame, an American classically trained tenor and trans activist based in Berlin, who risked losing his career by transitioning. As of 2019, Raker and Allegretti hoped to continue working with Madagame as a dramaturgical consultant and performer to pitch the work to opera companies in hopes of creating a full production.
