= The Good Dinosaur (soundtrack) =

The Good Dinosaur (Original Motion Picture Soundtrack)

Film score by Mychael and Jeff Danna
- Released: November 20, 2015
- Recorded: 2015
- Studios: Eastwood Scoring Stage, Warner Bros., Los Angeles
- Genre: Film score
- Length: 63:23
- Label: Walt Disney
- Producer: Chris Montan

Mychael Danna chronology
The Captive (2014)	The Good Dinosaur (2015)	Storks (2016)

Jeff Danna chronology
Montage of Heck (2015)	The Good Dinosaur (2015)	Storks (2016)

The Good Dinosaur (Original Motion Picture Soundtrack) is the score album to the 2015 Disney/Pixar animated film of the same name. The film score is composed by Mychael Danna and his brother Jeff Danna, thus becoming the first Pixar film to be scored by two composers. The score was recorded during April and October 2015, and various instruments were used, including pre-Columbian instruments, to reflect the landscape around the characters, which was an important part of the storytelling. Walt Disney Records released the soundtrack on November 20, 2015.

The ending theme for the Japanese release was contributed by Kiroro, and was a newly rerecorded "Mother Earth version" of their song "Best Friend".

== Development ==
Pixar's recurrent collaborator Thomas Newman was set to score music for the film, when Bob Peterson was set to direct the film with Peter Sohn. Following Peterson's exit, due to story problems, and Sohn being announced as the project's sole director, Mychael Danna was set to score music for the film. He was approached by Sohn and Ream due to his score for Life of Pi, which fetched him an Academy Award for Best Original Score. Jeff was chosen to co-write the score after Mychael had committed to several projects, and he had to work on lot of time to score for the film, as a solo composer.

The score was written during last April–October, with mockup recordings in the first month, using synthesised violas and oboes. In an interview with NPR Music, Jeff said that, he and Mychael chose researching for pre-Columbian music and made use of orchestral music, as "it really opens the door for a lot of interesting and unusual choices". After mockups, pre-recording sessions began within seven days with a single percussionist, as various solo instruments are captured in the process, before the full-fledged recording sessions take place.

"The entire process of making a music score is additive, so every little detail becomes part of the whole. And so you really learn that even the smallest shaker in the background is important."

— Mychael Danna

Over 75 musicians recorded the score at Eastwood Scoring Stage at Warner Bros., with executive music producer Chris Montan and Sohn, supevising the score sessions. In addition to percussions and brass, various instruments were used. Mychael and Jeff created a combination of sound by blending string guitar instruments that are primitive and folky. Other instruments such as bouzouki, Turkish cümbüş, Iranian saz, harpolek, mandolin and recorder. Jeff stated that "We wanted a sound for Arlo's fear. so we used an instrument called a fujara which is a Slovakian shepherd's pipe. It's a big, long overblown flute that we found effectively dark and evocative in representing Arlo's frame of mind in these fearful moments." A special theme was created for Arlo, that remained intact throughout the film. According to Mychael, "When he's born, it's delicate, plucked on a single instrument [...] As he encounters fear, loss and then confidence – that theme evolves and develops, and is ultimately played by a full orchestra as he gallops with joy across the mountaintops." They further created sounds using a toy piano and an out-of-tune upright piano, which they called it as a "church basement piano", which fit well with the film.

An 85-piece orchestra also played the sessions for five days, with Hollywood's top studio players recording. Later, the team took another 10 days for initial sound mixing, followed by Mychael and Jeff's visit to Skywalker Ranch for the final mixing and editing of the score, done by Sohn. In a video interview hosted by Jon Burlingame for Soundworks Collection, Mychael said that "You can feel the creativity oozing out of the walls in that place. It's really an amazing bunch of people and an amazing company and to be associated with it and to be able to work with them and see it close up, yeah, it was just unforgettable and wonderful experience."

== Track listing ==
All music is composed by Mychael Danna and Jeff Danna.

The Good Dinosaur (Original Motion Picture Soundtrack) track listing
No.	Title	Length
1.	"Homestead"	2:11
2.	"Hello Arlo"	2:49
3.	"Chores"	0:55
4.	"Make Your Mark"	2:07
5.	"Fireflies"	2:16
6.	"Critter Problem"	1:04
7.	"You're Me and More"	3:05
8.	"Family Struggle"	1:23
9.	"Swept Away"	1:33
10.	"Mountain Top"	0:51
11.	"Lost in the Wild"	3:35
12.	"Offerings"	1:32
13.	"Unexpected Friend"	2:56
14.	"Pet Collector"	2:24
15.	"Swimming Lessons"	2:29
16.	"Orphans"	4:39
17.	"The Storm"	1:17
18.	"I'm Never Getting Home"	0:44
19.	"Storm Chasers"	1:22
20.	"Bloodhound"	1:37
21.	"Fight Them Rustlers"	1:46
22.	"Run with the Herd"	3:51
23.	"Returned Call"	1:25
24.	"Sky Sharks"	1:47
25.	"Arlo's Vision"	1:35
26.	"Rescue"	2:31
27.	"Over the Falls"	2:41
28.	"Goodbye Spot"	4:12
29.	"Homecoming"	1:24
30.	"Arlo Makes His Mark"	1:22
Total length:		63:23

== Reception ==
The score received mixed response from critics. Writing for Laughing Place, Alex Reif said "Like the somber tone of the film, the soundtrack to The Good Dinosaur isn't particularly lively. Most of the melodies are slow and sad, with the occasional happy, up-tempo moment. But more often than not, it's either sad or frantic, depicting the same emotions as the story." James Southall of Movie Wave, reviewed "There's more action material, some of it with a darker flavour, and while it's competently done it is a bit on the generic side and doesn't stick around in the memory at all. This mixes not entirely seamlessly with some comic material which is – except when returning to the delightful style of the early tracks – frankly a bit irritating [...] The Good Dinosaur has a number of moments of great quality but is an unusually uneven listening experience as an album which makes it a bit less than the sum of its parts. Still, there's more than enough here to make it worth returning to." Pixar Post wrote "One can't help but make comparisons of a new film score to prior scores while listening and in our opinion, this feels much more like a John Powell live action score than any of the more common composers utilized by Pixar (Randy Newman, Michael Giacchino or Thomas Newman). Whether this type of feel for a Pixar film will be well received by critics en masse is yet to be seen, but one thing we can guarantee is that it's definitely worthy of adding to your Pixar score collection."
