= Lobster Palace =

Type of dining establishment

A Lobster Palace was a large, expensive, lavishly designed and decorated dining establishment, popular with the affluent and famous in New York City and other major cities in the United States from the late 1890s to the 1910s. The restaurants, a nexus of high society for about 14 years, acquired their moniker from what was regarded as their most characteristic dish, the expensive and, then fashionable, lobster.

== New York City ==
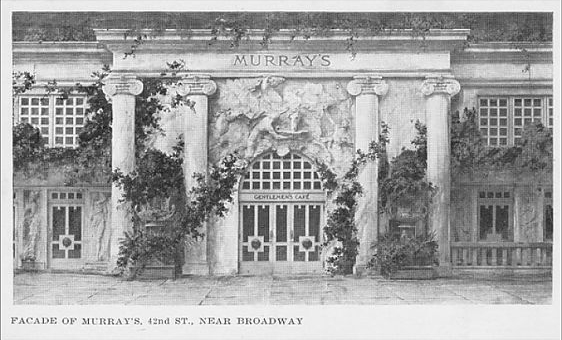
Exterior view of Murray's Roman Gardens on West 42nd Street at Broadway between Seventh and Eighth., circa 1915.

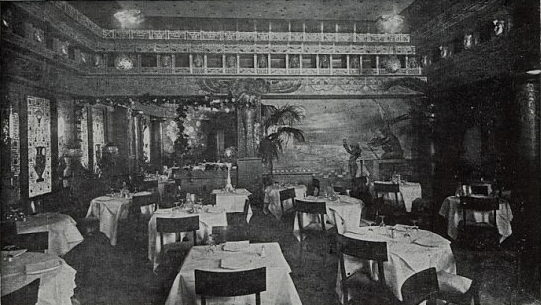
The Peacock room at Murray's Roman Gardens, New York CIty, circa 1915.

In the late-19th century, large, opulent dining establishments began to open in New York City near Broadway and 42nd Street in the city's Theater District located in Long Acre Square, the previous name of today's Times Square. At first, the restaurants catered to affluent theater goers and celebrities for both pre-performance dinners and after-performance suppers, but the patron base quickly expanded to include the elite from the business and artistic realms as well as wealthy international travelers from overseas, among others.

Due to their lavish, palatial interiors and late-night gayeties in which lobster was frequently served, the establishments acquired the "Lobster Palace" sobriquet. Open to everyone who had the means to pay, the palaces became the trendy destination for New York's wealthy and well-to-do. According to one account, lobster palace society in New York City counted among its denizens "Wall Street financiers, industrial magnates, gilded factions of the Four Hundred, gaudy playboys, journalists, celebrities from the Bohemia of the arts, the greatest stars of the theater, gamblers, jockeys, pugilists, professional beauties, chorus girls, kept women." The traditional social elite of New York City, however, were not counted among the regulars who patronized the palaces, although they did drop in from time to time.

The first palace to open was Rector's, which opened its doors in 1899 on Broadway between 43rd and 44th streets. Others quickly followed, including Bustanoby's, Churchill's, Faust's, Martin's, Murray's Roman Gardens, Reisenweber's, and Shanley's. To one extent or another, each new establishment tried to top the others, whether in lavish decorations, themed interiors, entertainment, or in the purveying of unusual, exotic foreign fare often at exorbitant prices.

In New York City, the palaces possessed all-night liquor licenses, a valuable asset which allowed food and alcohol consumption to continue until the early morning hours. This drew the consternation of reformers, who condemned what they saw as decadence. Like many other dining establishments, the lobster palaces generated most of their profit from alcohol sales. However, while lobster palace society flourished and was the epitome of conspicuous consumption, reform movements to control the manufacture and sale of alcohol were gaining serious traction in society.

Although lobster palace society manifested in other large American cities, it was in New York City that it reached its zenith in terms of opulence and extravagance. For about 14 years, until 1913, the establishments thrived and were at the center of high-society nightlife. Around 1912, however, new venues that offered dancing and smaller-scale, nightclub-like entertainment began to appear. The palaces tried to adjust, offering similar entertainments and dancing, and yet their efforts were not entirely successful as the public's fickle taste had shifted. Also, temperance reformers were achieving success in restricting how and when alcohol could be sold. Together, these factors hastened the closure of the lobster palaces, and one by one, they faded from the nightlife scene. Prohibition, enacted in 1919, ensured they would not return.

== See also ==
- Fine dining
- Haute cuisine
- Restaurant
- Gilded Age
- Shanley's Restaurants
