= Holden Madagame =

American transgender operatic tenor

- Born: 1990 (age 35–36)
- Education: University of Michigan
- Occupation: Opera singer (tenor)
- Years active: 2017–

Holden Madagame (born 1990) is an American (Odawa) opera tenor and trans activist.

== Career ==
Madagame attended the University of Michigan School of Music, Theatre & Dance, where he (Note: Madagame uses he/they pronouns. This article uses he/him pronouns for consistency.) studied under the bass-baritone Stephen West. Initially trained as a mezzo soprano, he eventually became a tenor after transitioning.

In 2017, Madagame participated in the Glyndebourne Academy. He has worked for companies including Passaggio Oper, Fulham Opera, Gerhart Hauptmann Theater in Görlitz, and the Brandenburgisches Konzertorchester.

In 2019, he collaborated and starred in Good Country in Austin, Texas, an opera about the life of stagecoach driver Charley Parkhurst.

=== Film and television ===
Madagame provided voice-over work for the 2016 film The Florence Foster Jenkins Story.

=== Activism ===
Madagame is a trans activist. His YouTube channel features videos about various transgender topics.

When participating in the 2021 "Circle of Resilience" concert for Intermountain Opera Bozeman in Bozeman, Montana, Madagame produced a video educating the audience about Two-spirit people.

== Personal life ==
Madagame was born in 1990. He is an Odawa Native American.

Madagame is a queer, transmasculine non-binary person. He started hormone replacement therapy in 2015, which had the side effect of altering his voice.

Prior to transitioning Madagame was a mezzo soprano. When considering whether or not to transition, Madagame was initially told that he "wouldn't be able to sing anymore professionally" due to the effects of testosterone on the voice. He eventually contacted a singing teacher at the University of Michigan who suggested that as a result of the changes he might become a tenor, remarking "how exciting is that?" His voice eventually settled into the tenor range, with Madagame remarking that his voice "is a completely different instrument", and that while he was a good student and had a lot of the same abilities, he was still "starting from the ground up".

As of 2021, he resides in Berlin, Germany.

== See also ==
- Glyndebourne Festival Opera
- American Indian opera
