= Storks (film) =

2016 American animated film

- Theatrical release poster
- Directed by: Nicholas Stoller; Doug Sweetland
- Written by: Nicholas Stoller
- Produced by: Brad Lewis; Nicholas Stoller
- Starring: Andy Samberg; Katie Crown; Kelsey Grammer; Jennifer Aniston; Ty Burrell; Keegan-Michael Key; Jordan Peele; Danny Trejo
- Cinematography: Simon Dunsdon
- Edited by: John Venzon
- Music by: Mychael Danna; Jeff Danna
- Production companies: Warner Animation Group; RatPac-Dune Entertainment; Stoller Global Solutions
- Distributed by: Warner Bros. Pictures
- Release dates: September 17, 2016 (Regency Village Theater); September 23, 2016 (United States)
- Running time: 87 minutes
- Country: United States
- Language: English
- Budget: $70 million
- Box office: $183.4 million

Storks is a 2016 American animated adventure comedy film directed by Nicholas Stoller and Doug Sweetland, and written by Stoller. The film features the voices of Andy Samberg, Katie Crown, Kelsey Grammer, Jennifer Aniston, Ty Burrell, Keegan-Michael Key, Jordan Peele, and Danny Trejo. The film follows two distribution centre employees—hotshot package delivering stork Junior and his human colleague Tulip—who accidentally create a baby using a defunct baby factory. In order to protect the baby from the company's manager, the two embark on a journey to deliver the baby to her family.

The project was announced by Warner Animation Group in January 2013, with Sweetland attached to direct, and Stoller hired to write the screenplay. It was announced in April 2015 that Stoller and Sweetland would co-direct the film, and Stoller would produce the film alongside Brad Lewis. The main cast was announced soon after. Mychael and Jeff Danna composed the film's musical score. The animation was provided by Sony Pictures Imageworks.

Storks premiered at the Regency Village Theater in Los Angeles, California on September 17, 2016, and was theatrically released in the United States by Warner Bros. Pictures on September 23. The film received mixed reviews from critics, who praised the animation, humor and voice acting, but criticized the story. It was a commercial success, earning $183 million against a $70 million budget.

== Plot ==
For generations, the storks of Stork Mountain delivered babies to families around the world, until one stork named Jasper imprinted on an infant girl and attempted to keep her for himself. Jasper accidentally dropped the infant's address beacon, shattering it, and went into exile. Unable to deliver the orphaned girl, the storks adopted her under the name Tulip. CEO stork Hunter discontinues baby delivery in favor of online package delivery with Cornerstore.com.

Somewhat of an outcast, the now-adult creative Tulip tries to promote new ideas for Cornerstore, which consistently backfire and cause the company to lose stocks (and when they do make progress, it is when she’s absent). On her eighteenth birthday, Hunter declares her to be a severe burden and liability due to this incompetence. Hunter explains to Junior, his top employee, that he is being promoted to chairman, and so he chooses him to take his place as boss, exciting Junior. Hunter assigns Junior with firing Tulip before being promoted to boss. Despite being desperate to prove himself, Junior cannot bring himself to do so and instead fraudulently transfers Tulip to the abandoned mailroom, which hasn't been used since the storks stopped delivering babies, under the pretence that she must sort letters, whilst informing Hunter that he was successful in firing Tulip.

Meanwhile, a 4-year-old young boy named Nate Gardner, who lives with his workaholic parents Henry and Sarah, is lonely and wants a younger sibling. Unaware that the storks stopped delivering babies, he sends a letter to Cornerstore and it reaches Tulip, who enters the defunct baby factory and inserts the letter into the baby-making machine, causing it to create a pink-haired infant girl. Junior injures his wing trying to turn off the machine. Afraid that Hunter will fire him, Junior agrees to accompany Tulip and secretly deliver the baby to her family using a makeshift flying craft that Tulip invented. They eventually crash, escape a pack of wolves that fall in love with the baby, and reach civilization, during which Junior and Tulip bond with the baby and name her Diamond Destiny. Junior shares that he doesn't know why he wants to be in charge, and Tulip confesses she built the plane to try and find her family by herself, as well as a single piece of her homing beacon she wears as a necklace. Meanwhile, Henry and Sarah open up to Nate's desire for a younger sibling and bond with their son by building a landing platform for the storks.

Junior and Tulip encounter Jasper, who had followed them from Stork Mountain. Jasper apologises for 'orphaning' Tulip and shows her that he has nearly repaired her delivery beacon, but is missing one piece, which had been in Tulip's possession for years. Junior, at first attempting to send Tulip on her way without hurting her feelings, is forced to confess to Tulip that he was supposed to fire her and that there is nothing left for her at Stork Mountain. Feeling saddened, Tulip leaves with Jasper to meet her family while Junior continues alone to deliver Diamond Destiny. Cornerstore's pigeon employee Toady learns about Diamond Destiny and informs Hunter, who reroutes her address beacon and leads Junior into a trap. Hunter has Diamond Destiny taken away to live with penguins in order to silence the incident and prevent more plummeting stocks while Junior is tied up and gagged.

Tulip reunites with Junior and frees him. They return to Stork Mountain during the highly anticipated Storkcon event to save Diamond Destiny from the penguins. When they are cornered in the baby factory by Hunter and the other stork employees, Junior sends millions of archived letters from families into the baby-making machine, causing it to rapidly produce babies and distract the storks. Hunter seizes control of a giant crane and tries to destroy the factory, but Diamond Destiny finds the crane's controls and causes Hunter to lose control and cut the lines holding Cornerstore on; Cornerstore and Hunter fall off the mountain. As a final resort, he makes an attempt to take Junior and Tulip down with him. Junior manages to save themselves by flying again, his dislocated wing popped back into place with Tulip's help.

In the aftermath of Cornerstore's destruction, Junior rallies the storks to deliver all the babies to their families around the world. Junior, Tulip, and Jasper deliver Diamond Destiny to the Gardners. Nate is at first disappointed about not getting a brother but quickly cheers up upon seeing his new sister's ninja skills. Tulip finally meets her missing family, and Junior continues working as the co-boss at Stork Mountain.

== Voice cast ==
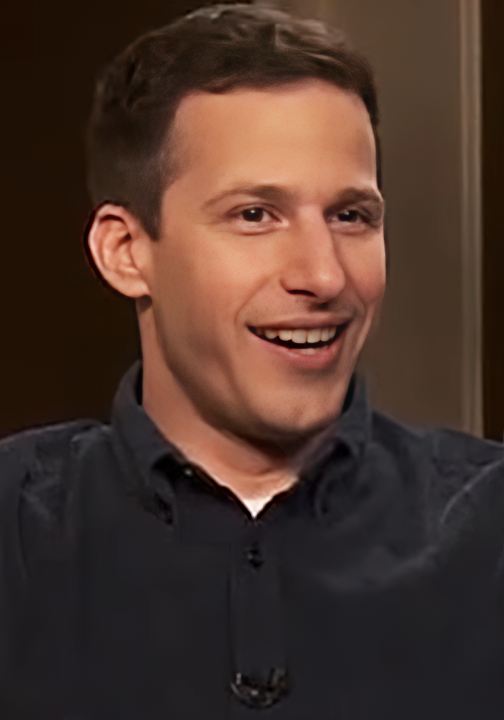
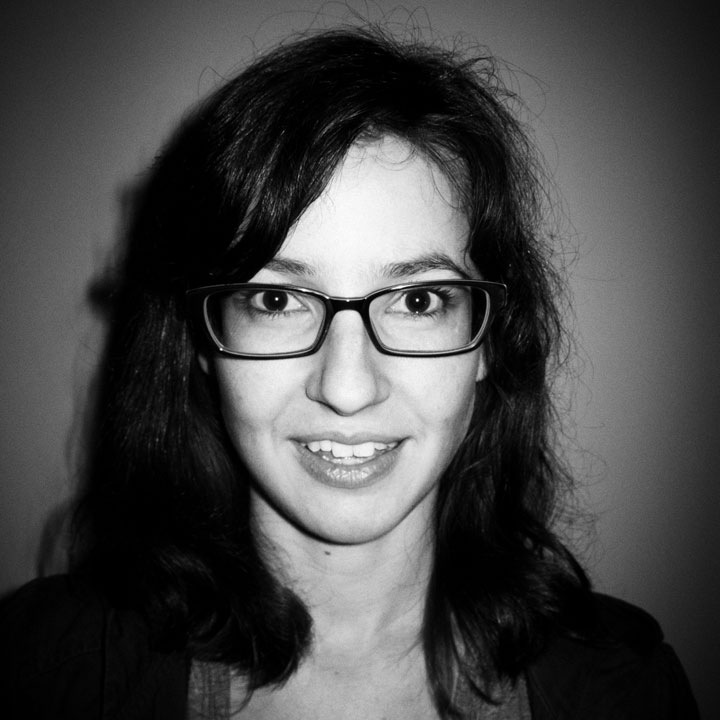
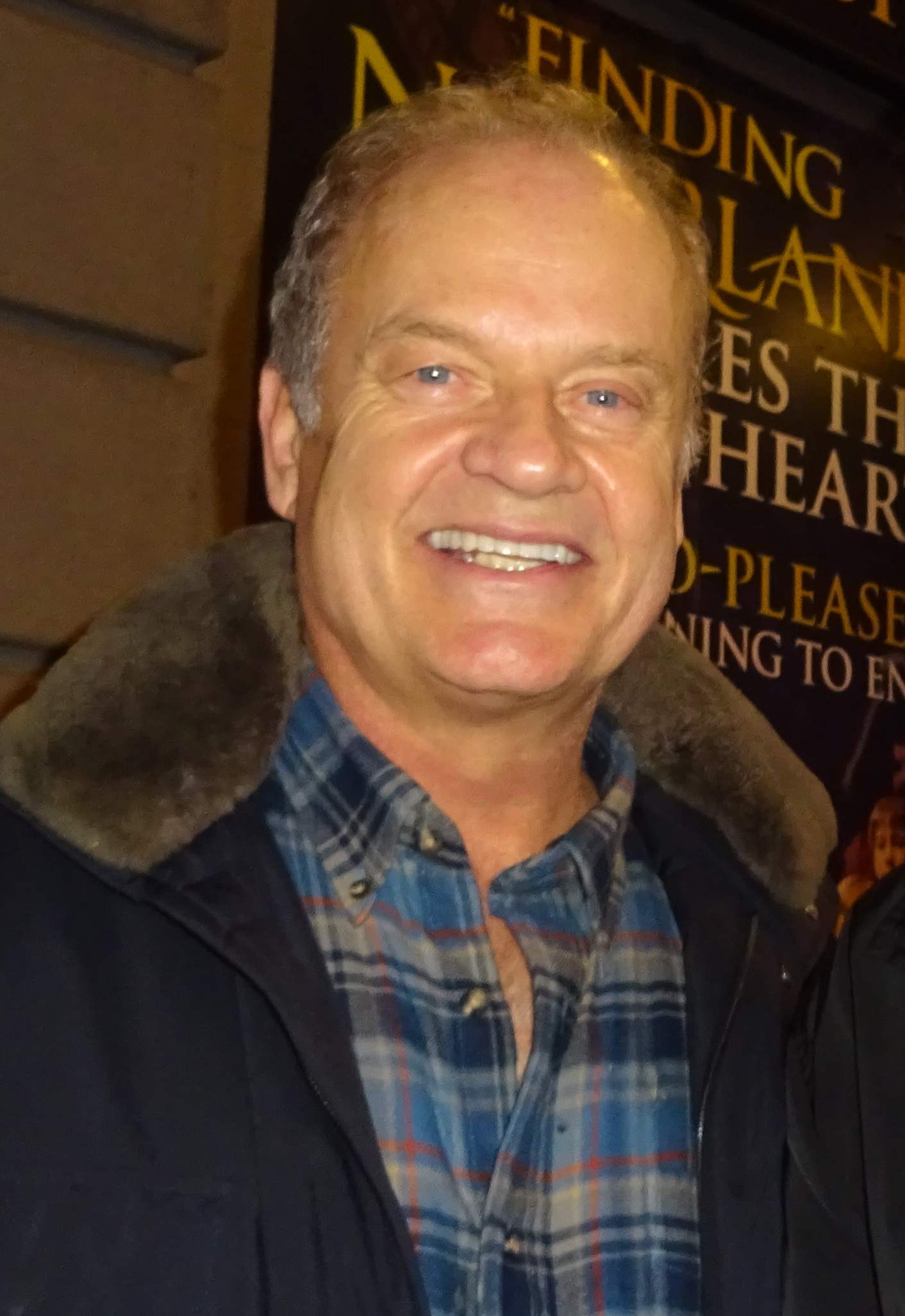
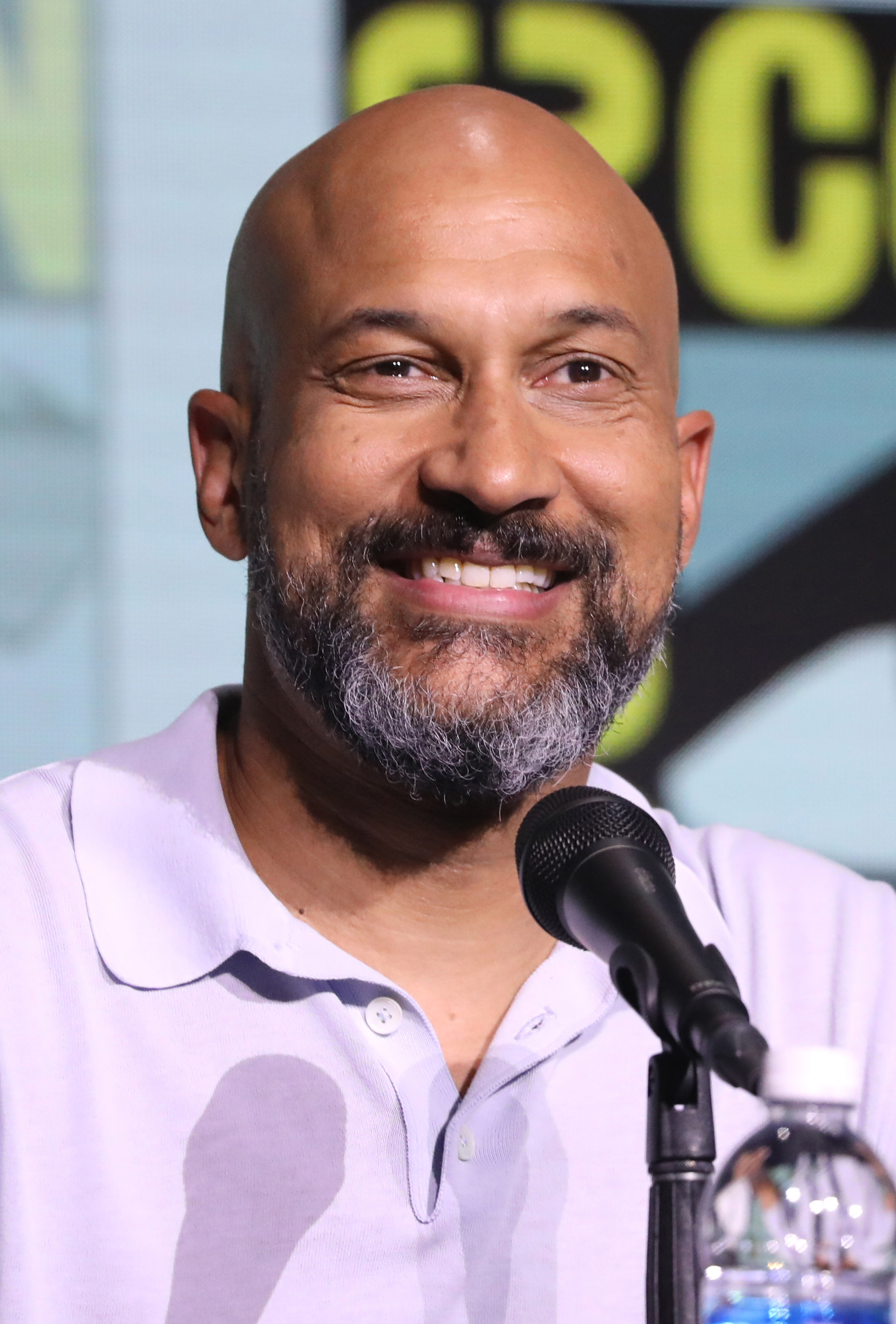
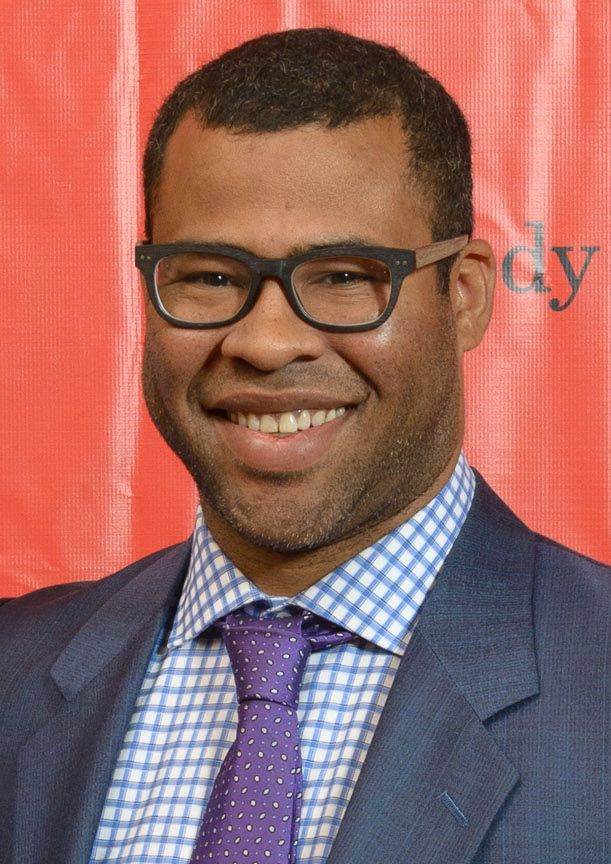
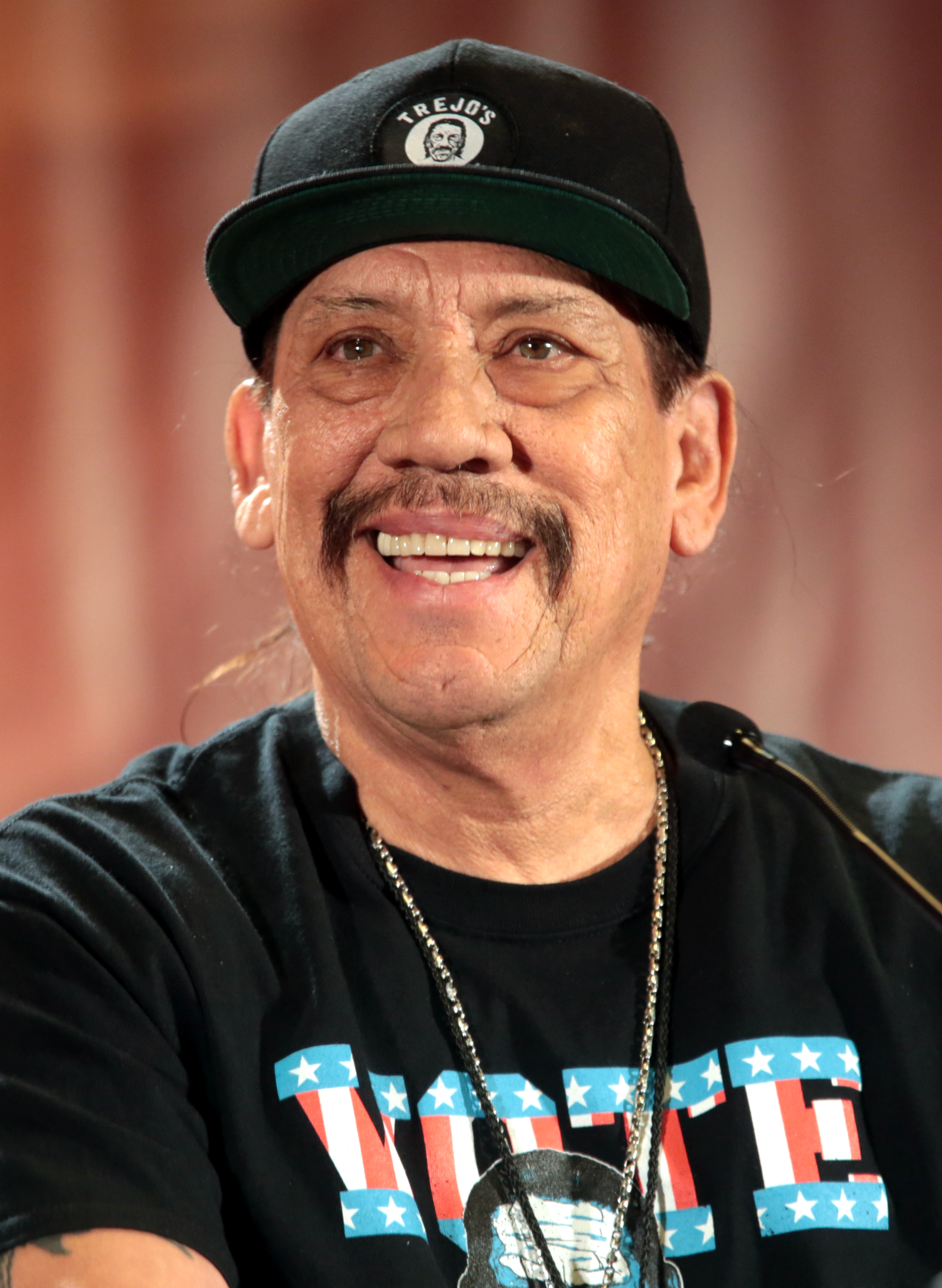
Andy Samberg, Katie Crown, Kelsey Grammer, Keegan-Michael Key, Jordan Peele, and Danny Trejo, who are the respective voices of Junior, Tulip, Hunter, Alpha, Beta, and Jasper in the film.
- Andy Samberg as Junior, a white stork working at Cornerstore as the company’s top delivery stork in hopes of being promoted to boss
- Katie Crown as Tulip, an orphan teenage human employee at Cornerstore, who is willing to find her biological family
- Kelsey Grammer as Hunter, a cruel white stork who is the CEO of Cornerstore and has a hatred of baby delivery
- Jennifer Aniston as Sarah Gardner, Nate's workaholic and overprotective mother
- Ty Burrell as Henry Gardner, Nate's workaholic father
- Anton Starkman as Nathan "Nate" Gardner, a 4-year-old boy with workaholic parents, causing him to feel lonely
- Keegan-Michael Key as Alpha, a greedy but caring wolf and the pack leader who wants to devour Junior and Tulip and adopt the baby
- Jordan Peele as Beta, a wolf and Alpha's deputy
- Danny Trejo as Jasper, a white stork who formerly worked at Cornerstore
- Stephen Kramer Glickman as Pigeon Toady, an awkward and nosy pigeon working at Cornerstore who is eager to get any kind of attention

== Production ==
The project was first announced in January 2013, when Warner Bros. formed its animation "think tank" with some directors and writers to develop animated films, Nicholas Stoller was hired by the studio to create and write Storks, while Doug Sweetland was attached to direct the film. On April 20, 2015, Andy Samberg and Kelsey Grammer were added to the voice cast of the film, and it was announced that Stoller and Sweetland would co-direct the film, while Stoller would produce the film alongside Brad Lewis. The original idea film was developed under Warner Animation Group. By December 2015, Keegan-Michael Key and Jordan Peele were also added to the cast who provided their voices for the film. On June 15, 2016, Jennifer Aniston, Ty Burrell, and Anton Starkman were added to the cast. Sony Pictures Imageworks handled animation services for the film.

== Soundtrack ==
Storks (Original Motion Picture Soundtrack)

Soundtrack album by Mychael Danna and Jeff Danna
- Released: September 16, 2016
- Recorded: 2016
- Genre: Film score
- Length: 50:02
- Label: WaterTower Music
- Producers: Mychael Danna; Jeff Danna
- Compiler: WaterTower Music

WaterTower Music Soundtrack albums chronology
Suicide Squad (Original Motion Picture Soundtrack) (2016)	Storks (Original Motion Picture Soundtrack) (2016)	Fantastic Beasts and Where to Find Them (Original Motion Picture Soundtrack) (2016)

Mychael Danna & Jeff Danna Soundtrack albums chronology
The Good Dinosaur (Original Motion Picture Soundtrack) (2015)	Storks (Original Motion Picture Soundtrack) (2016)	Billy Lynn's Long Halftime Walk (Original Motion Picture Soundtrack) (2016)

The film's score was composed by Mychael Danna and Jeff Danna. The soundtrack also contains "Holdin' Out", performed by The Lumineers. The soundtrack was released on September 16, 2016, by WaterTower Music. The film featured songs "Good Day" by DNCE, "How You Like Me Now" by The Heavy, "And She Was" by Talking Heads, "Keep On Loving You" by REO Speedwagon, and "Fire and the Flood" by Vance Joy, but these songs do not feature in the soundtrack. The song "Kiss the Sky" by Jason Derulo was made for the film but does not appear on the soundtrack.

The Japanese release uses "Heiwa" by Ai as its theme song, named after her daughter.

== Track listing ==
All tracks are written and performed by Mychael Danna and Jeff Danna, except where noted.

Storks (Original Motion Picture Soundtrack) track listing
No.	Title	Length
1.	"Stork Mountain"	1:08
2.	"Our New Phones"	0:42
3.	"Boss"	2:13
4.	"Orphan Tulip"	1:25
5.	"I Want a Baby Brother"	2:59
6.	"Bored, Bored, Bored"	0:36
7.	"Ninja Force Attack"	1:02
8.	"Monumental Screw Up"	1:40
9.	"The Baby Factory"	2:13
10.	"Deliver This Thing"	1:31
11.	"Five More Minutes, And Then We Stop"	1:40
12.	"Good Day Orphan Tulip"	1:07
13.	"Wolf Pack"	3:38
14.	"Fleeting Moments, Precious Memories"	1:40
15.	"You'll Find Your Family"	1:31
16.	"Suddenly, You're In a Suit"	0:54
17.	"At the Harbour"	2:03
18.	"Defusing Diamond Destiny"	2:01
19.	"I Have the Missing Piece"	1:09
20.	"Tulip's Family"	1:57
21.	"Gentrification"	1:36
22.	"Return To Cornerstore"	0:59
23.	"They Don't Deliver Babies"	1:17
24.	"Sphericus"	1:24
25.	"Hand Over the Package"	0:56
26.	"A Million Babies"	1:55
27.	"Destroy the Baby Machine"	2:07
28.	"This Is Our Mission"	1:16
29.	"Always Deliver"	2:03
30.	"Holdin' Out" (Written by Jeremiah Fraites and Wesley Schultz, Performed by The Lumineers)	3:06
Total length:		50:02

== Release ==
Storks was originally going to be released on February 10, 2017, which Warner Bros. had reset for The Lego Batman Movie. The film was released on September 23, 2016, which was previously set for The Lego Ninjago Movie, which was then moved to a year later. Storks was preceded by The Master, a five-minute short film based on the Lego Ninjago line of sets, the short was later re-released in cinemas with The Lego Batman Movie in selected cinemas in the UK.

=== Home media ===
Storks was released by Warner Home Video on Blu-ray (2D, 3D and 4K Ultra HD) and DVD on December 20, 2016, with a digital release on December 6, 2016. Extras included a two-minute short film, titled Storks: Guide to Your New Baby (with onscreen title Pigeon Toady's Guide to Baby's) and the Lego Ninjago short film, The Master.

== Reception ==
=== Box office ===
Storks grossed $72.7 million in the United States and Canada and $109.7 million in other countries for a worldwide total of $182.4 million, against a budget of $70 million.

In the United States and Canada, Storks opened alongside The Magnificent Seven and was originally projected to gross around $30 million from 3,922 theaters in its opening weekend, with some estimates reaching $36 million. The Hollywood Reporter noted that in recent decades, Warner Bros. has not been able to produce very successful and lucrative animated films except for Space Jam in 1996, The Polar Express in 2004, Happy Feet in 2006, and The Lego Movie in 2014 and that the studio is hoping Storks would duplicate that success. It grossed $435,000 from its Thursday previews and just $5.7 million on its first day, lowering weekend projections to $20 million. It ended up opening to $21.8 million, finishing second at the box office behind The Magnificent Seven's $35 million debut.

Internationally, the film opened in conjuncture with its North American debut across 34 foreign territories, including the likes of Russia, China, India, and Japan.

=== Critical response ===
On review aggregator Rotten Tomatoes, the film has an approval rating of 65% based on 138 reviews and has an average rating of 6.10/10. The website's critical consensus reads, "Colorful animation and a charming cast help Storks achieve a limited liftoff, but scattershot gags and a confused, hyperactively unspooled plot keep it from truly soaring." On Metacritic, the film has a score of 56 out of 100 based on 31 critics, indicating "mixed or average reviews". Audiences polled by CinemaScore gave the film an average grade of "A−" on an A+ to F scale.

Michael Rechtshaffen of The Hollywood Reporter gave the film a positive review and said: "There's a nice, snappy playfulness in the rapport between Samberg and engaging newcomer Crown. That lively, back-and-forth vibe also extends to the Aniston/Burrell and Key/Peele dynamic." Peter Hartlaub of San Francisco Chronicle wrote: "Whoever is running Warner Animation Group appears to be allowing the lunatics to run the asylum. And that is a wonderful thing." Tom Russo of The Boston Globe gave the film three stars out of four and said "Storks are known for delivering bundles that are irresistible, exhaustingly active at times, and frequently pretty darn messy. How completely appropriate, then, that Warner Bros.' 3-D animated feature Storks delivers the same."

Owen Gleiberman of Variety gave the film a mixed review and called it "a strenuously unfunny animated comedy". Samantha Ladwig of IGN rated the film a 4 1/2 (of 10) and said "Storks starts off well enough and delivers a few laughs, but ultimately it isn't quite sure of what it is." Jesse Hassenger of The A.V. Club noted the "filmmakers' assumption [...] that if lines are said very fast and in silly voices, they will become funny," and criticized Warner Bros. for putting out a generic animation along the same, safe lines of what "other second-tier animation houses" are producing: "The Lego Movie brought with it the hope that the studio might reclaim some of the animation territory it has long ceded to other studios. Storks, though, is just another okay cartoon."

Joe Morgenstern of The Wall Street Journal gave the film a negative review, saying "The whole movie seems to be on fast-forward, with crushingly brainless dialogue, hollow imagery and no way of slowing down the febrile action or making sense of the chaotic plot." Barbara VanDenburgh of The Arizona Republic said, "Storks is charmless with rote obligation. This is a kid's film for hire, with none of the creativity, emotion and design that elevate the genre to art, or even simply a fun time at the movies."

=== LGBTQ representation ===
Storks was noted for its inclusion of same-gender couples. GLAAD called it "casually inclusive of same-sex couples."

=== Accolades ===
Award	Category	Recipient(s)	Result	Ref.
Annie Awards	Outstanding Achievement, Voice Acting in an Animated Feature Production	Katie Crown	Nominated	
Heartland Film Festival 2016	Truly Moving Picture Award	Nicholas Stoller	Won	
Hollywood Film Awards	Hollywood Film Composer Award	Mychael Danna (also for Billy Lynn's Long Halftime Walk)	Won	
Village Voice Film Poll	Best Animated Feature	"Storks"	Nominated	
