= Milton B. Matson =

American entertainer

Milton B. Matson (circa 1852-July 3, 1907) is notable for being one of the earliest recorded American crossdressers who gained notoriety through media attention. He was a transgender man and crossdresser who was arrested in San Francisco in January of 1895 after a warrant was issued for his arrest for obtaining money under false pretense in Los Gatos, California. At the time, San Francisco had its own crossdressing laws that prohibited the act in public. Although Matson was not arrested under these charges, he was made a spectacle by the media which published sensational articles on Matson's "true" identity as a woman. Matson was eventually released and spent some time on display as part of a local dime museum.

Matson's gender identity was debated during the late 19th century. At this time, American society existed within the confines of a gender binary where sex and gender was either male or female. People who didn't conform to stereotypical masculine or feminine gender expressions were often unprotected classes of citizens. Matson eventually returned to court to in 1903 to assert recognition for his gender identity as a male.

== Arrest ==
Matson first made headlines in a San Francisco Examiner report published on January 28, 1895. In early January of 1895, Milton B. Matson was arrested at 103 Larkin Street under charges of gathering money under false pretense. At this time, Matson was engaged to Miss Ellen (sometimes referred to in the press as Helen) Fairweather. The two met while in Santa Cruz. The San Francisco Examiner reports that both Matson and Miss Fairweather were shocked at the events that took place. Matson attempted to secure a $1,000 bail from his betrothed. It was discovered that Matson was also wanted in Los Gatos for an additional charge of obtaining money under false pretenses.

Matson’s identity was revealed when he misspoke when questioned about a bank order. His birth name was revealed to be Louisa Elizabeth Myrtle Blaxton Matson. After this revelation, newspapers began referring to Matson as a woman and with the “she/her” pronouns.

While in jail, Matson received many visitors who were curious about his identity and presentation. Matson deigned to speak with visitors about personal details. Matson made statements about his family. He reported that his choice to dress like a man was upon request from his mother. Prison guards reported that they were suspicious of Matson’s gender due to his body shape that was decidedly “feminine,” and stated that they would give Matson women's clothing.

Matson was soon to be released from the county jail in San Jose when the British Bank of North America agreed to pay the money of $140 to Matson despite the difference in the name for which the account was under and addressed to. It was stated that Matson sat smugly in his cell with a look of satisfaction on his face while smoking. Due to the revelation that Matson was born a woman, concessions were made that made his stay in jail more comfortable than others.

Matson eventually agreed to leave the county jail while wearing women's clothing, but ended up leaving jail after three weeks dressed in men's clothing. However, in his statement, he also stated his wish to go back to Australia once freed. In addition, he made a statement on his fear of San Francisco. In the February 1, 1895 San Jose Daily Herald a journalist noted that he had known Matson during his time in Australia, and that he had uniformly presented as a man there while working in the real estate business.

== Public Spectacle ==
Milton B. Matson joined the San Francisco dime museum scene once he gained notoriety from his arrest. Frank Clifton, a manager of a small dime museum, offered Matson a position to sit on public display while wearing men’s clothing. Needing money, Matson accepted the job offer and became “The Bogus Man” for five weeks. Part of his contract included the inability to wear men’s clothing in public for the sole purpose of enticing people to pay to see him on display.

Matson toyed with the public in a game of cat and mouse, sometimes refusing to answer certain questions and other times offering insights on his relationship with Fairweather. During interviews, Matson also stated that his role at the museum was simply “one of the inevitabilities of life.”

In 1903, Matson returned to court to stand on trial and assert his male gender identity. He demanded that his identity be recognized despite his gender at birth. Unfortunately, he was sent to an insane asylum where he spent 60 days in the women’s jail. Although Matson lost, he contributed to the ongoing efforts for the discontinuation of a gender binary for a more inclusive understanding of the gender spectrum.

== Later Life and Death ==
Matson's later life remains largely obscure. However, the July 4, 1907 morning edition of the San Jose Mercury does record his death from apoplexy while living in a refugee camp in San Francisco after the 1906 San Francisco earthquake and ensuing fires destroyed much of the city. It is noted that Matson's "masculine face, angular figure and male attire averted suspicions as to her sex." He was noted to be about 55 years old, "was not inclined to mingle much with her neighbors, but was friendly and kind. Every one liked "the old gentleman".

== San Francisco Cross-Dressing Law ==
In 1863, San Francisco passed a cross-dressing law that banned cross-dressing in public areas. Public cross-dressing was now illegal as part of a widespread trend against indecency. This law arose due to large demographic changes within the San Francisco population and general cultural anxieties over peoples' behavior. The law targeted clothing reformers, gender impersonators, and people who displayed physical anatomy that differed from their legal gender identification. The law assumed bad intent and did not acknowledge the nuanced reasons of people choosing to wear different clothing for personal or practical reasons.

The population was growing in the tens of thousands due to the migration of young men for the promise of economic freedom and development of capital with the Gold Rush. Even before the 1863 law was passed, many men and women participated in cross-dressing activities. Men took on feminine roles such as domestic labor and also participated in dances and masquerade balls as the "lady partner" while wearing women's clothing.

Women also participated in cross-dressing. Similar to Matson, a notable figure is Charley Parkhurst, a stagecoach driver whose gender as a woman was revealed upon his death. Many women who wore men’s clothing were spoken about in public discourse with the identification of “women in disguise” despite the fact that not all women who participated in this activity identified as men. Rather, many women wore men’s clothing because it was practical.

== Dime Museums ==
San Francisco had many dime museums including the Museum of Living Wonders on Kearny Street, Woodward’s Gardens in the Mission district, and the Pacific Museum of Anatomy and Science on Market Street.

Dime museums arose during a time of complex change in increasingly diversified cities within the urban landscape. Traditional ways of living were altered to fit both the new racial and economic boundaries that were being transgressed. To meet the needs of a new middle and working class that demanded forms of relief from industrial processes as well as found themselves growing in leisure time, new forms of popular culture emerged for the purpose of mass entertainment.

Dime museums followed the now controversial tradition of freak shows. Freak shows trace their origin back to the end of the 18th century and beginning of the 19th century throughout Western Europe in gardens and parks. Popularity grew as decades passed until the height of their popularity one hundred years later. Although freak shows were primarily part of entertainment displays such as those in fairs, museums, or circuses, they were also frequently associated with markets and even gardens. These forms of entertainment accentuated exoticism and non-traditional differences such as different skin colors, languages, and other physical abnormalities. However, this emerged in relation to the “othering” of non-European or non-Western civilization.
