= Matthew Luhn =

American author and filmmaker

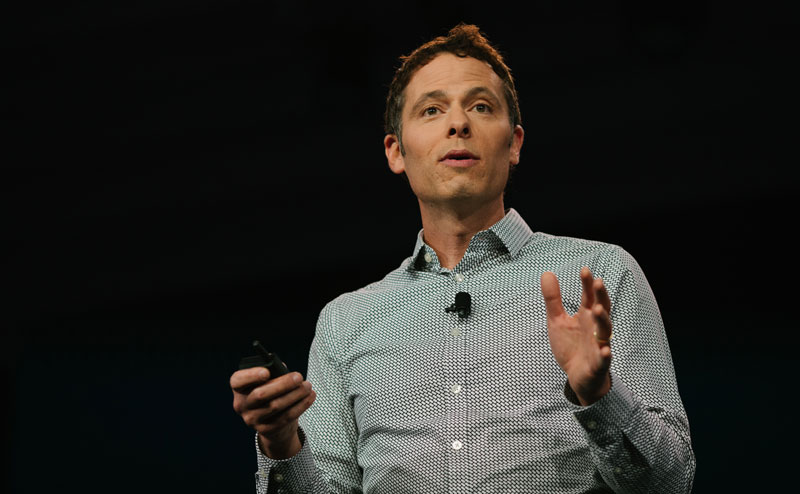
- Luhn in 2017
- Education: Academy of Art University (BFA)
- Occupations: Storyboard artist; animator; author; creative writing instructor
- Years active: 1992–present
- Spouse: Valerie LaPointe
- Children: 2
- Writing career
- Years active: 2009–present
- Genres: Cartoon drawing; children's literature; screenwriting
- Website: matthewluhnstory.com

Matthew Luhn is an American storyboard artist, animator, and writer for Pixar and The Simpsons. He is also known for serving as a creative writing instructor and keynote speaker.

== Career ==
Luhn attended the character animation program at the California Institute of the Arts. In 1993, he directed his student film Starship Spacehustle, and was offered his first animation job. He dropped out of CalArts, and at the age 19, he was the youngest animator hired to work on The Simpsons. His work includes the episodes: "Kamp Krusty" (1992), "Lisa's Pony" (1992), "Homer Alone" (1992), "Colonel Homer" (1992), "Homer Defined" (1992), and "Burns Verkaufen der Kraftwerk" (1992).

Shortly thereafter, Luhn joined Pixar Animation Studios, becoming one of the first 12 animators on the studio's feature film, Toy Story (1995). He stated, "I loved working on Toy Story, but the part that really interested me was the big picture – the story part ... But I wasn't able to make the transition over from animator to storyteller easily." Luhn was told that he was not experienced enough to become a storyboard artist. He left Pixar to gain experience as a freelance storyboard artist and copywriter for several commercial studios. After a year, he sent his storyboard portfolio to Pixar, and he was rehired as a storyboard artist for Toy Story 2 (1999).

Outside his career as a story artist and animator, Luhn is also a keynote speaker who has trained chief executive officers, marketing teams, directors and other professionals how to craft and tell stories for Fortune 500 companies. Matthew also gave a TEDx Talk at the University of California, Santa Barbara.

== Personal life ==
Luhn is married to Valerie LaPointe, and he has two daughters.

== Filmography ==
=== Films ===
Year	Title	Story Artist	Animator	Notes
1995	Casper	No	Additional animator: ILM	
1995	Toy Story	No	Additional	
1999	Toy Story 2	Yes	No	
2001	Monsters, Inc.	Yes	No	
2003	Finding Nemo	Additional	No	
2006	Cars	Yes	No	Uncredited
2007	Ratatouille	Yes	No	
2009	Up	Yes	No	
2010	Toy Story 3	Yes	No	
2013	Monsters University	Yes	No	
2019	Toy Story 4	Yes	No	Uncredited
2020	Onward	Yes	No	Uncredited

=== Shorts ===
Year	Title	Director	Writer	Story Artist	Animator	Notes
1993	Starship Spacehustle	Yes	Yes	No	Yes	Student film
2013	Toy Story of Terror!	No	No	Yes	No	
2014	Toy Story That Time Forgot	No	No	Yes	No	
2017	Lou	No	No	Yes	No	
2021	Sprite Fright	Yes	Yes	No	No	

== Books ==
- How to Draw Cartoon Animation. General Pencil Company. 2009. ISBN 978-0-982-36710-0.
- How to Draw Cartoon Pets: Learn to Draw Your Favorite Pets Step-by-Step. General Pencil Company. 2012. ISBN 978-0-982-36714-8.
- The Best Story Wins: How to Leverage Hollywood Storytelling in Business and Beyond. Morgan James Publishing. 2018. ISBN 978-1-642-79065-8.
- Santa Yeti. Kane/Miller. 2023. ISBN 978-1-684-64603-6.
