= Presto (film) =

- Directed by: Doug Sweetland
- Written by: Doug Sweetland
- Story by: Ted Mathot; Valerie LaPointe; Justin Wright
- Produced by: Richard Hollander
- Starring: Doug Sweetland
- Edited by: Katherine Ringgold
- Music by: Scot Stafford
- Production company: Pixar Animation Studios
- Distributed by: Walt Disney Studios Motion Pictures (Note: Distributed by Walt Disney Studios Motion Pictures through the Walt Disney Pictures banner.)
- Release dates: June 10, 2008 (Annecy International Animated Film Festival); June 27, 2008 (with WALL-E)
- Running time: 5:17
- Country: United States

Presto is a 2008 American animated short film by Pixar, written and directed by veteran Pixar animator Doug Sweetland in his directorial debut. Its story was boarded by Ted Mathot, Valerie LaPointe, and Justin Wright. The short is about Presto, a magician who is trying to perform a show, but his rabbit, Alec, would not cooperate with him until he gets his carrot. It is a gag-filled homage to classic cartoons such as Tom and Jerry and Looney Tunes, as well as the work of Tex Avery.

The original idea for the short was a magician who incorporated a rabbit into his act who suffered from stage fright. This was considered to be too long and complicated, and the idea was reworked. To design the theater featured in Presto, the filmmakers visited several opera houses and theaters for set design ideas. Problems arose when trying to animate the theater's audience of 2,500 patrons; this was deemed too expensive, and was solved by showing the back of the audience.

Presto premiered at the Annecy International Animated Film Festival on June 10, 2008, and was released in the United States on June 27, playing in theaters before WALL-E. It received positive reviews, with reviewers of WALL-E's home media release considering the short to be an enjoyable special feature (though it was not included with the subsequent Criterion 4K Blu-ray in 2022). The short film was nominated for an Annie Award and Academy Award. It was included in the Animation Show of Shows in 2008.

== Plot ==
Vaudeville era magician Presto DiGiotagione^{[a]} is famous for a hat trick wherein he pulls his rabbit Alec Azam^{[b]} out of his top hat. A hungry and irritated Alec is locked in a cage, unable to reach his carrot. After Presto returns from eating a meal, he begins practicing his act with Alec, revealing that his top hat is magically connected to a wizard's hat kept backstage with Alec. Anything that passes into either hat will emerge from the other.

Intending to feed Alec, Presto realizes that his show is starting and rushes onstage instead. Alec refuses to cooperate with the act until he is given the carrot, and cleverly turns the hats against Presto in a variety of ways that lead to escalating degrees of humiliation. This includes causing Presto to catch his finger in a mousetrap, hit himself in the eye with an egg, close his hand in a drawer, poke himself in the face, stick his head in an air vent, and hit himself in the crotch with a ladder. Each of these mishaps is interpreted by the audience as being part of the act, and they applaud. Presto begins to antagonize Alec at the same time, first turning the carrot into a flower and later smashing it; Alec retaliates by using the hats to stick Presto's finger into an electrical socket.

Fed up with Alec's behavior, Presto chases him backstage, but catches his foot in a rope and is yanked up into the fly space above the stage when the curtain opens. When Presto's foot comes loose, he falls, as do several props and a hanging piano. Realizing Presto will be crushed, Alec uses the hats' magic to save him, earning the audience's wild approval. Presto gratefully restores the carrot and gives it to Alec; later, Presto gives Alec second billing on the posters advertising the act.

== Production ==
In the opening shot, Alec is shown desperately stretching for an out of reach carrot. In order to get to the conflict quickly, viewers are shown what the rabbit wants almost immediately.

Doug Sweetland made his directorial debut with Presto. Sweetland provides the dialogue-free voice acting for both of the movie's characters. He pitched the film at the start of 2007 and began production late in the year, completing it in May 2008. Presto's gag based format was heavily influenced by classic cartoons. Looney Tunes cartoons directed by Tex Avery were a major influence, with Alec being easily compared to Bugs Bunny. Other influences include Tom and Jerry, the Marx Brothers, and Charlie Chaplin. The character design for Presto was based on William Powell.

The original scenario for the short involved a magician who incorporates an autograph seeking rabbit into his act after his previous rabbit leaves him. Complications arise as the new rabbit has stage fright. Sweetland compared it to the plot of A Star Is Born. The idea was reworked due to being too long and complicated, taking an estimated three minutes longer to tell.

To achieve the highly formal environment, the filmmakers looked at the Royal Opera House in London, the Paris Opera House and classic vaudeville theaters like the Geary in San Francisco—which the crew took a tour through—for set design ideas. Animating the theater's audience of 2,500 patrons proved an expensive proposition, even with the help of the crowd-generating MASSIVE software.

Early suggestions were to show cutaways of just a small portion of the audience, but the full effect was achieved by only showing the back of the audience. To save time, most of the audience models were borrowed from the previous Pixar film, Ratatouille. Additionally, Presto's body (from the neck down) is Skinner's lawyer, and the carrot was one of the many food props from that film. Statler and Waldorf from The Muppets also appear as audience members in one of the boxes.

== Reception ==
Reaction to the short film was positive. Carl Cortez of If called Presto a "winner through and through". Jake Coyle of the Associated Press found Presto to be "a delightful and cartoonish appetizer" which kept the tradition of short pre feature films alive. Darren Bevan of Television New Zealand thought that although WALL-E was a "delightful tale" and "truly gorgeous", Presto "very nearly stole WALL-E's thunder". James Sanford of the Kalamazoo Gazette called the short a superb and hilarious curtain raiser, describing it as a Bugs Bunny Looney Tunes version of The Prestige. Presto was nominated for the 36th Annie Award for Best Animated Short Subject. The short was also nominated for the Academy Award for Best Animated Short Film.

== See also ==
- Presto (animation software)

== Notes ==
a: A play on the word 'prestidigitation'
b: A play on the magic word 'alakazam'
