= Presto (animation software) =

Proprietary animation software

Presto Animation System
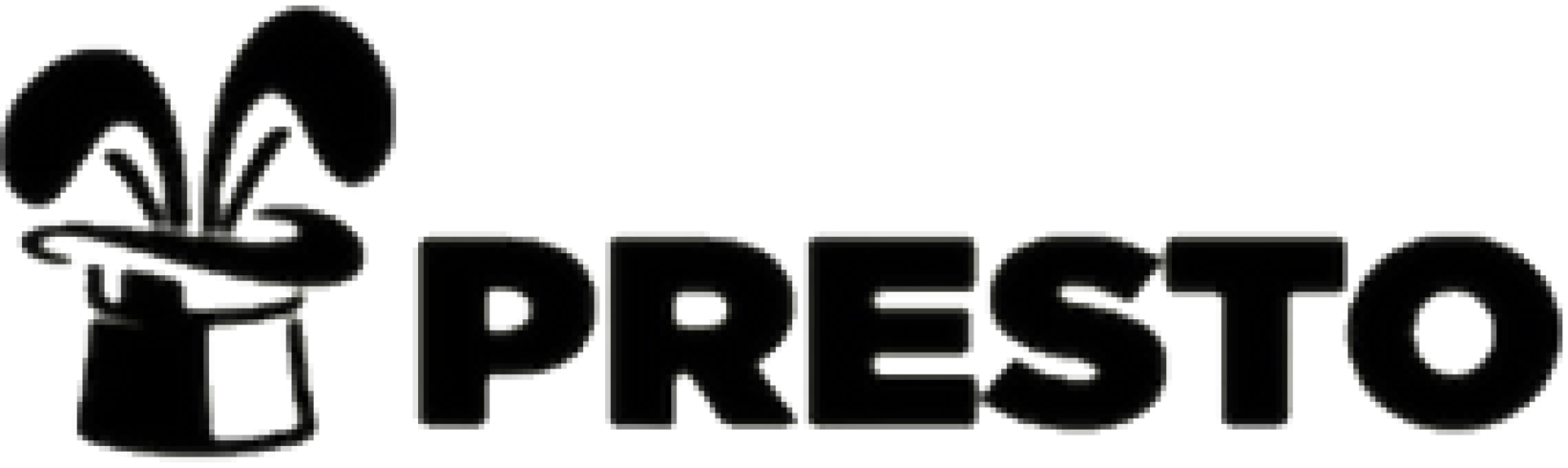
- 2020 logo

- Screenshot of Presto as of 2014
- Developer: Pixar Animation Studios
- License: Proprietary

Presto is the proprietary software developed and used in-house by Pixar Animation Studios in the animation of its features and short films. Presto is not available for sale and is only used by Pixar. As a result, little is known outside Pixar about the detailed workings of this software. Pixar's older proprietary animation software menv (pronounced as "men-vee") — known more commonly by the press as Marionette — was superseded by Presto at some point prior to the 2012 release of Brave, the first feature film animated in Presto. Its sister studio Walt Disney Animation Studios would also adopt the software at some point before the 2025 release of Zootopia 2. Pixar claims that Presto is designed to be intuitive and familiar to animators who have traditional cel animation experience. The logo for Presto was designed by Parakeet, a design studio based in Portland, Oregon. Presto was named after the 2008 animated short of the same name, which itself is about the titular magician character.

Pixar chooses to use a proprietary system instead of the commercial products available and used by other companies because it can edit the software code to meet its own specific needs. One example of this editing is shown in extra features of The Incredibles DVD; it is explained that previous versions of Marionette were not able to stretch models in the ways needed to correctly animate Elastigirl, so the in-house Marionette development team created a new version that included this feature.

In 2018, Patrick Stewart presented Academy Technical Achievement Awards to Rob Jensen for the foundational design and continued development, to Thomas Hahn for the animation toolset, and to George ElKoura, Adam Woodbury and Dirk Van Gelder for the high-performance execution engine of the Presto Animation System. The Academy of Motion Picture Arts and Sciences award announcement stated "Presto allows artists to work interactively in scene context with full-resolution geometric models and sophisticated rig controls, and has significantly increased the productivity of character animators at Pixar."

== Sources ==
- Paik, Karen (2007). To Infinity and Beyond!: The Story of Pixar Animation Studios. Based on interviews and research by Leslie Iwerks. San Francisco: Chronicle Books. ISBN 0-8118-5012-9. OCLC 154685487.
