= Shanley's Restaurants =

American eateries at the end of the 19th and beginning of the 20th centuries

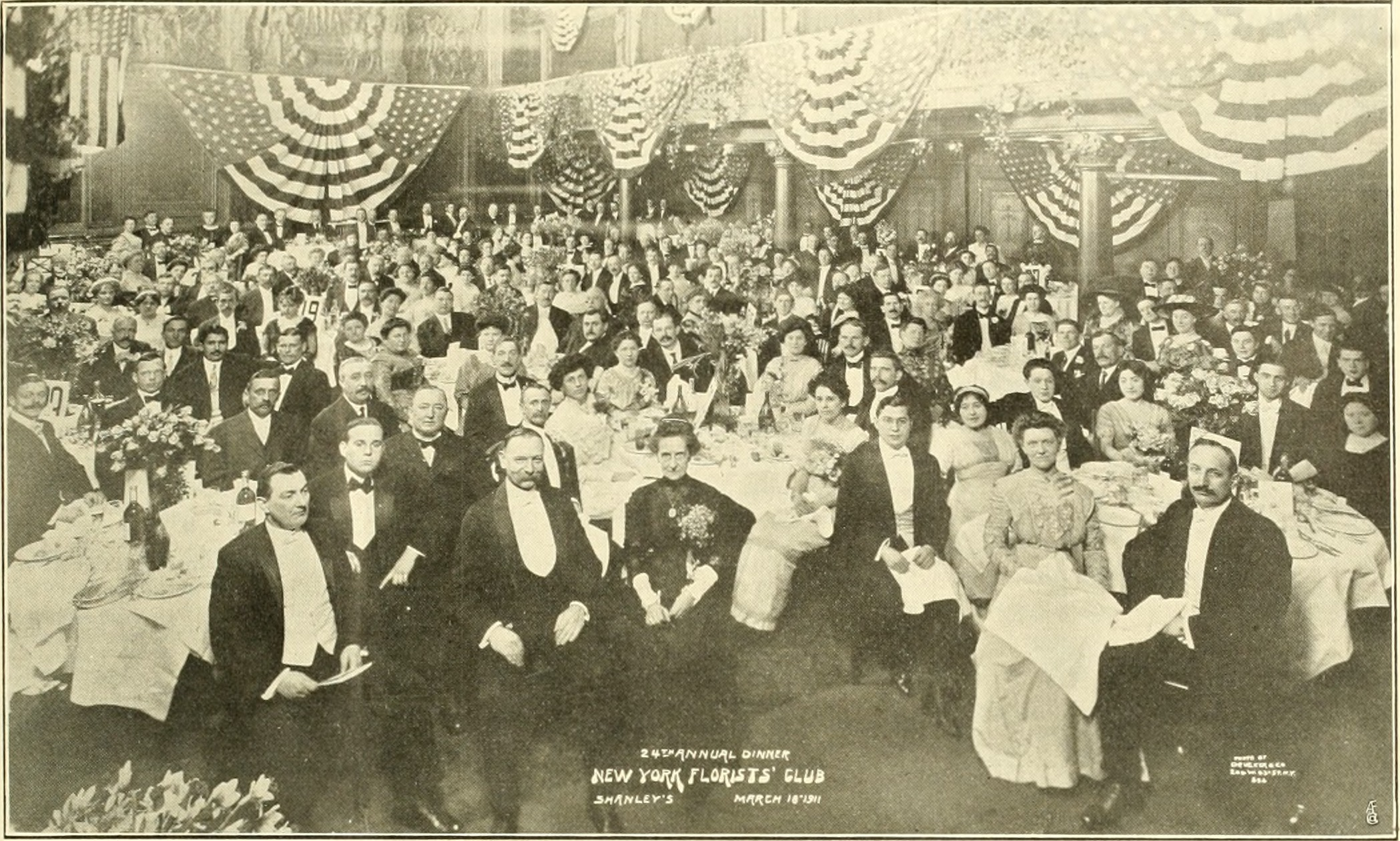
- 24th annual dinner of the New York Florists Club at Shanley's (March 18, 1911)

Restaurant information
- Established: 1890
- Closed: 1925
- Previous owner: Thomas J. Shanley (founder)
- Location: Manhattan, New York, USA, United States

Shanley's Restaurants were elegant Manhattan eateries that operated from 1890 to 1925.

== History ==
The first Shanley's Restaurant was located at 23rd Street and 6th Avenue. It was owned by Thomas J. Shanley, Bernard F. Shanley, Patrick J. Shanley and four other Shanley brothers. The restaurants were famous in Times Square until the Prohibition era, beginning with their initial restaurant in 1890. The brothers were born in County Leitrim, Ireland, and came to the United States in 1888. The last Shanley's closed in 1925.

The first and last of the famous "lobster palaces" of Broadway was Shanley's. There were seven brothers in the clan and it was common jest in the early 1900s that whenever the Shanley's were about to open a new spot, they would send to Ireland for another brother. At one time there were four Shanley Restaurants operating concurrently. The head of the tribe was Tom Shanley. Tom and Barney Shanley opened a restaurant on Sixth Avenue, between 23rd and 24th Sts., then the center of the nite life in the city. The second restaurant was opened in 1896 on Broadway, between 29th and 30th St; and, thereafter, the Shanley Restaurants followed the northward tide of commerce and entertainment. In 1896, Oscar Hammerstein startled the town by opening The New York Theater on Broadway, between 44th and 45th St. Skeptics thought the impresario "crazy" for venturing above 42nd Street. The Shanley's followed suit, crossing the 42nd St."deadline" to open a restaurant on the east side of Broadway and 43rd Street.

This trail-blazing venture was the forerunner of the lobster palaces that were later to decorate the Gay White Way. Ornate chandeliers and other elegant trappings made the new Shanley's the talk of the town. The Empire Room on the main floor dazzled diners with its gilt, mahogany and mirrors. The Ladies Restaurant on the second floor was resplendent in red and green, done in the style of Louis XVI. On the third floor was the Roman Court, a sumptuous banquet room with two balconies and a ceiling 30 feet high. Mythological Roman subjects were presented in bas-relief at one end of the room.

Shanley's "uptown" spot became a rendezvous for stage and political celebrities.John and Ethel Barrymore, Teddy Roosevelt, Harry Houdini, David Belasco, Richard Mansfield, "Diamond Jim" Brady and Lillian Russell might be seen at adjacent tables. When Adolph Ochs built the Times Tower on Longacre Square (later Times Square) in 1904, Shanley's became the social headquarters for his editorial and executive staff.

When the Putnam Palace opened on the West Side of Broadway, (where the Paramount Theater now stands) the Shanley's rented space on the 43rd side and opened the most ambitious cafe, at a cost of $350,000. Opening nite, July 14, 1910, the crowd that occupied every one of the 315 tables, included: former D.A. William Travers Jerome (who prosecuted Harry Thaw), Tammany leader Charlie Murphy, the Sullivans; actors Sam Bernard, Lew Fields, Joe Weber, Douglas Fairbanks. Among the ladies present, were: Louise Dresser, who later became famous in theater and films and Lillian Lorraine, described by Ziegfeld as the most beautiful woman in the world.

Shanley's, indirectly, was a motivating factor in the creation of ASCAP, today, one of the most powerful unions in the entertainment field. Victor Herbert was dining at Shanley's, listening to the orchestra play a medley of his compositions, when the waiter handed him a staggering check. "You've charged me for every item on the menu, apparently, and I am paying the bill? But how much are you paying me for playing my compositions? The answer, of course, was "nothing." With this, Herbert sued Patrick Shanley, for the illegal use of his compositions. The suit went all the way to the Supreme Court, where Oliver Wendell Holmes ruled in favor of Victor Herbert and as a result, ASCAP was founded.

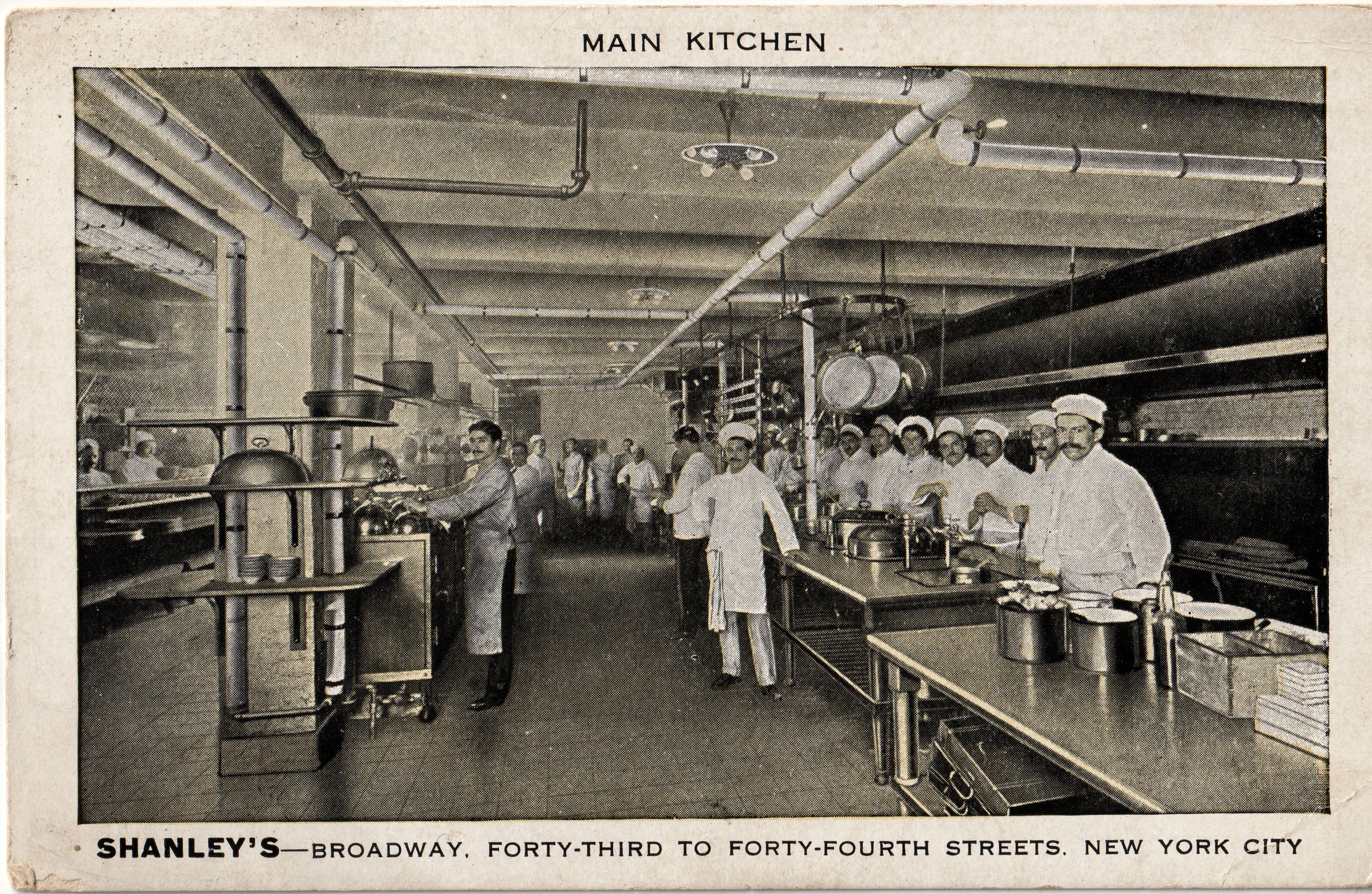
Main kitchen of Shanley's on Broadway

== Chronology of establishments ==
The Shanley Restaurants followed the journey of the theater, beginning on 23rd Street and finding their great success in Times Square, which was then called, "Longacre Square. The Shanley's followed the commerce and theater uptown, crossing the 42nd street barrier and was frequented largely by the theater and political crowd.

== Appearances in culture ==
- This Side of Paradise by F. Scott Fitzgerald
- The Big Money by John Dos Passos

Page 11:

He handed out a half a dollar to the doorman who had whispered "Shanley's" to the taxi-driver in a serious careful flunkey's voice. The taxi was purring smoothly downtown between the tall square buildings. Charley was a little dizzy....

Page 147-148:

... When they got up to the room they kissed each other in a hurry and washed up to go out to a show. First they went to Shanley's to dinner. Tony ordered expensive champagne and they both got to giggling on it.
