= Storyboard artist =

Person who creates storyboards for advertising agencies and film productions

A storyboard artist (sometimes called a story artist, board artist or visualiser) creates storyboards for advertising agencies and film productions.

== Work ==
A storyboard artist visualizes stories and sketches frames of the story. They are the main interpreter of pre-visualisation, their drawings illustrating the visuals that will make up the narrative of the film. Quick pencil drawings and marker renderings are two of the most common traditional techniques, although nowadays Adobe Flash, Adobe Photoshop, Storyboard Pro, and other storyboard applications are often used. The digital camera is one of the latest techniques in creating storyboards.

Most storyboard artists begin and finish their work on computers using software and digital pencils or a graphics tablet. Storyboard artists may use photos to create visuals where stock photos or photos taken specifically for the project are put together digitally to produce a photographic representation called a photovisual.

For motion pictures, some filmmakers, directors, and producers choose to use clip-art computer programs designed to create storyboards or use a dedicated 3D storyboarding software, or a more multi-purpose 3D program which can also be used to create elements of the storyboards.

The average pay for storyboard artists in the US can vary significantly, with some estimates putting it at eighty-nine thousand, or ninety-six thousand dollars per year. Animators, including storyboard artists tend to live in expensive areas, which can be hard financially considering their level pay.

== Industry-specific work ==
Storyboard artists have different goals in different industries.

=== Advertising ===
In advertising, there are two phases of the storyboard. The first is called the agency storyboard, in which an artist is called upon to create a representation of what the finished TV commercial, or spot, will look like in order to persuade and engage the client to buy the concept being pitched. This can either be at the time the agency is trying to win the client's business or once the client has signed on with the agency. In either case, the important element is for the storyboards to visualize for the client what the agency's creative director or "creatives" are thinking will sell the client's product. A storyboard artist may also be asked to visually represent several versions of a campaign for print ads. Agency storyboards are typically created in full color and detail, whether originating from photographs manipulated in Photoshop or other photo editing software, or drawn from scratch by a storyboard artist, or even a combination of the two where a storyboard artist combines photographic images and drawing. The number of frames in an agency storyboard is typically kept to a minimum as to quickly convey the overall creative idea to the client without risking them getting caught up in the details of how the commercial would actually be shot. Often the agency board is composed of only one or two "key frames".

Once the client approves the agency board, it is sent out to potential commercial production companies/directors or photographers who pitch their vision of how they might create the final commercial or print ad. In respect of the commercial, this initiates the second phase of the storyboard, called the production/shooting storyboard. These boards are a linear set of frames that can express a specific shooting style, camera movement, edit, effects, casting, locations, wardrobe, props, product placement, etc. a director envisions. The shooting board is most often created once the job is awarded to a production company/director, based on their treatment of pitch, but can sometimes accompany those items in an effort to win the job from the advertising agency.

In contrast to the agency storyboards, the shooting storyboards are often created in black and white and drawn in a much quicker, looser style. When applicable, a director/production company can create a shooting board out of photographs, often using a proposed location and stand-in talent.

=== Live-action film ===
In live-action film, a storyboard artist is hired at the beginning of a project. When a storyboard artist is hired by a motion picture company, the artist must break down the scenes of the script into shots that can be filmed. This is done under the supervision of the film's director in order to ensure the director's vision from the start of the project. As the production proceeds, the storyboards are presented to the cinematographer who is then responsible for bringing that vision to the screen.

Film production companies may also hire a storyboard artist to create polished presentation-style storyboards (which might also include sound) which can be used by an executive producer to raise the money to create the film.

=== Animation ===
In animation, projects are often pitched on the basis of storyboards alone (that is, a screenplay may not be written until later), and storyboard artists continue to work throughout the production to develop particular sequences. After a sequence is edited the director and/or storyboard artist and the team may need to rework the sequence as it becomes evident that changes need to be made for timing and story.
