= Earl "Presto" Johnson =

American magician (died 2009)

Earl "Presto" Johnson (died 2009) was a vaudevillian-styled magician who performed extensively throughout New York for many years.

A short archived video clip of Earl was featured on the main page for Genii magazine during March 2012.
