= List of Pixar staff =

This is a list of staff at Pixar Animation Studios. This includes past Pixar employees, as well as those who served as its primary directors and creative executives.

== Key ==
- AB: Ash Brannon
- AlB: Alan Barillaro
- AC: Andrew Coats
- AG: Axel Geddes
- AH: Andy Hendrickson
- AJ: Andrew Jimenez
- AM: Angus MacLane
- AdM: Adrian Molina
- AuM: Austin Madison
- AJR: A. J. Riebli
- ARS: Alvy Ray Smith
- AS: Andrew Stanton
- AW: Andrea Warren
- BA: Bonnie Arnold
- BAR: Bobby Alcid Rubio
- BB: Brad Bird
- BB: Ben Burtt
- BC: Brenda Chapman
- BF: Brian Fee
- BL: Bud Luckey
- BnL: Brian Larsen
- BrL: Brad Lewis
- BP: Bob Peterson
- BoP: Bob Pauley
- BW: Brad West
- CJ: Clydene Jackson
- CS: Clark Spencer
- DB: Dylan Brown
- DC: Daniel Chong
- DF: Danielle Feinberg
- DG: Dan Gerson
- DH: Darren Holmes
- DKA: Darla K. Anderson
- DL: Dan Lee
- DLM: Daniel López Muñoz
- DM: Dave Mullins
- DaM: Dana Murray
- DR: Denise Ream
- DS: Dan Scanlon
- DoS: Doug Sweetland
- DmS: Domee Shi
- DvS: David Silverman
- DT: David Torres
- EC: Edwin Catmull
- EdC: Edwing Chang
- ErC: Enrico Casarosa
- EFO: Eben Fiske Ostby
- EK: Edgar Karapetyan
- ElK: Elissa Knight
- EM: Erica Milsom
- GM: Glenn McQueen
- GQ: Guido Quaroni
- GR: Gary Rydstrom
- GS: Galyn Susman
- GCS: Gini Cruz Santos
- GW: Graham Walters
- HJ: Harley Jessup
- IN: Irsan Nurwan
- JC: Jim Capobianco
- JsC: Josh Cooley
- JH: Jason Hudak
- JK: John Kahrs
- JCK: Jean-Claude Kalache
- JaK: Jason Katz
- JoK: Jorgen Klubien
- JL: John Lasseter
- JaL: Janet Lucroy
- JeL: Jeremy Lasky
- JM: Jim Morris
- JFM: James Ford Murphy
- JaP: Jan Pinkava
- JeP: Jeff Pidgeon
- JdR: John Ratzenberger
- JhR: Joe Ranft
- JoR: Jonas Rivera
- JS: Jay Shuster
- JW: John Walker
- KB: Kyle Balda
- KOB: Kevin O'Brien
- KH: Kenna Harris
- KL: Kristen Lester
- KM: Kelsey Mann
- KeR: Kevin Reher
- KoR: Kori Rae
- KS: Katherine Sarafian
- KeS: Ken Schretzmann
- KW: Kim White
- LC: Loren Carpenter
- LiC: Lindsey Collins
- LR: Lou Romano
- LU: Lee Unkrich
- MA: Mark Andrews
- MaA: Mahyar Abousaeedi
- MH: Maurissa Horwitz
- MiA: Michael Arndt
- MtA: Matt Aspbury
- MJ: Mike Jones
- ML: Matthew Luhn
- MLF: Meg LeFauve
- MO: Michael K. O'Brien
- MN: Mark Nielsen
- MS: Michael Silvers
- MaS: Marc Sondheimer
- MdS: Madeline Sharafian
- MiS: Michael Sparber
- MW: Mark Walsh
- MaW: Magnus Wrenninge
- NPG: Nicole Paradis Grindle
- NP: Nick Pitera
- NCS: Nicolas C. Smith
- NS: Nick Sung
- OS: Osnat Shurer
- PD: Pete Docter
- PL: Patrick Lin
- PS: Peter Sohn
- RA: Robert Anderson
- RLB: Robert L. Baird
- RC: Robert L. Cook
- RDC: Ronnie Del Carmen
- RC: Roy Conli
- RG: Ralph Guggenheim
- RLG: Roger L. Gould
- RoG: Rob Gibbs
- RK: Robert Kondo
- RN: Ricky Nierva
- RQ: Rich Quade
- RS: Rosana Sullivan
- RT: Randy Thom
- SB: Steve Bloom
- SC: Sharon Calahan
- SCH: Steven Clay Hunter
- SJ: Steve Jobs
- SjP: Sanjay Patel
- SPR: Steve Pilcher
- SPL: Steve Purcell
- SS: Stephen Schaffer
- SU: Saschka Unseld
- TD: Tom Duff
- TM: Tom Myers
- TN: Teddy Newton
- TG: Tim Greer
- WC: William Cone
- WR: William Reeves

== Feature films ==
Film title	Director/ Co-Director	Writer	Voiced character(s)	Animator	Editorial Department	Producer/Executive Producer	Production Designer	Director of Photography/ DP–Lighting	Art Department	Sound	Story Artist	Visual Effects	Other credit
Toy Story	JL	JL, JhR, PD, AS	JdR, JhR, JeP, AS	JeP, JaK, GM, PD, BP, AS, BL, TP, ML	LU	RG, BA, EC, SJ	RE		RE, BL	MS, GR	JhR, JeP, JaK, AS, BL	JL, WR, LC	SC
A Bug's Life	JL/AS	JL, AS, JhR	JdR, JL, AS, JhR	JL, JhR, JeP, AS, LU, AM, KB, JFM, JK	JaK, DL, GM, BP, JaP, AS, JoK, BL, LU	DKA, KeR	WC	SC	BP, BL, JoK, JeR	MS, GR	JhR, JeP, JaK, PD, BP, JoK, BL	DF, LC, TD	JCL
Toy Story 2	JL/LU, AB	JL, PD, AB, AS	JdR, JL, JhR, JeP, AS, LU	JeP, JaK, DL, GM, BP, JaP, BL, AM, KB, JFM, SjP, JK, ML, GCS	LU	JhR, JeP, JaK, BP, JaP, JoK, BL	WC	SC	DL, JoK, JeR	MS, GR	AM	DL, GQ, GS, DF, LC, TD	KW
Monsters, Inc.	PD/LU, DvS	JeP, DG, PD, RE, AS	JdR, JhR, JeP, DG, PD, GQ, LU, BP	JhR, JaK, DL, GM, BL, AM, KB, JFM, SjP, DM, JK, ML, GCS	LU, NP	DKA, JL, AS, LC	HJ, BoP		LR, DL, JaP, RE, JoK, BL, JeR	MS, GR, TM	JhR, JaK, BP, JoK, BL, AM, SjP	DL, AJ, GQ, GS, DF, TD	JCL, KW, MO
Finding Nemo	AS/LU	BP, AS	JdR, JhR, BP, AS, LU, BP	DL, AM, DM, GCS	LU	GW, JL	RE	SC, JeL	DL, PS, ML, JeR	MS, GR	JaK, LU, BL, RDC	AJ, DF, MO	KW, MO
The Incredibles	BB	BB	JdR, JhR, BB, JeP, TN, LR, PD, BP, AS, BL, PS, AJR	TN, PS, AM, JFM, SjP, DM, JK, GCS	SS	JW, JL	LR	AJ, PL, JaL	RE, PS, KOB	MS, RT	MA, BL, JsC	AJ, DF	MO
Cars	JL/JhR	JL, JhR, BC, JoK	JdR, GQ, JhR, AS, JoR, LR, LiC, ElK, BP, DS, TN, AJR	BL, AM, DM, ML	KeS	DKA	WC, BoP	JCK/JeL	DS, JoK, BL, JeR	MS, TM	DS, DG, BF, JsC	MO	
Ratatouille	BB/JaP	BB, JaP, JC	JdR, BB, TN, LR, PS	AJ, PS, AM, AuM, JFM, SjP, DM, JK, GCS	DH	BrL, JL, AS, JM	HJ	RA/SC	DL, ML, KOB, JeR	MS, RT	PS, BL, RDC, JsC	AJ, DF	KW, MO
WALL-E	AS	AS, PD	JdR, ElK, JeP, PD	AM, AuM	SS	JM, LiC, JL	RE	JeL/DF	KOB	MS	PS, AM, RDC, BF, JeP, RoG	DF, MO	
Up	PD/BP	BP, PD	JdR, PD, BP, JsC, BC, JeP, JeR	AM, AuM, GCS	KN	JoR, JL, AS	RN	PL	LR, DLM, ML	MS, TM	PS, RDC, JsC, RoG, NS	EdC, NP	MO
Toy Story 3	LU	MiA, JL, AS, LU	JdR, TN, BL, LU, BP, JeP, JeR	AM, AuM, ML	KeS	DKA, JL	BoP	JeL	BL, NS	MS, TM	BL, AdM, DS		NP
Cars 2	JL/BrL	JL, BL	JdR, JL, BL, GQ	AC	SS	DR	HJ	JeL/SC	JS, KOB	MS, TM	NS, BF, JsC	NP	NP
Brave	MA, BC/SPL	BC	JdR, SPL	AC, GCS	NCS	KS, JL, AS, PD	SPR	RA/DF	DLM, JeR	MS, GR, EJH	RDC, NS	EdC, DF, MO, NP	
Monsters University	DS	DG, RLB, DS	JdR, BP, PS	SjP, ML	GS	KoR, JL, PD, AS, LU	RN	MtA/JCK	DLM	MS, TM	BF, AdM, KM, RDC, BAR, JeP	RDC	
Inside Out	PD/RDC	PD, RDC, JoC, MLF	JdR, PD, RDC, JsC, NP	AC, JeR	KN	JoR, JL, AS	RE	PL/KW		MS		EdC, DF	GCS, MaW
The Good Dinosaur	PS	BP, MLF, PS, KM	JdR, PS	DT	SS	DR, JL, AS, LU	HJ, DLM	MaA/SC	KOB	MS	EK, IN	MO, NP, MaW	
Finding Dory	AS/AM	AS	JdR, BP, AS, AM, JeR	DT		LiC, JL	SPR	JeL	DLM	MS	JC, EK	MO, SCH	
Cars 3	BF	BP, BF	GQ, JdR, BP, JeR			KeR, AW, JL	WC	JeL/MiS, KW	KOB, JeR	MS, TM		NP	
Coco	LU/AdM	AdM	JdR	GCS		DKA, JL	HJ	MtA/DF	DLM, MdS	MS	JaK	DF, MO	
Incredibles 2	BB	BB	BB, JdR			JW, NPG, JL	RE	JeL	DLM	MS		NP	
Toy Story 4	JsC	JL, AS, JsC	JdR			JoR, MN, JL, AS, LU, PD				MS			
Onward	DS	DS	JdR			KoR							
Soul	PD	MJ, PD				DaM							
Luca	ErC	JA, ErC, SS	PS			AW							
Turning Red	DmS	JC, DmS				LiC, PD							
Lightyear	AM	JH, AM, MA	PS		AG	GS, PD, AS							
Elemental	PS	PS, JH, KL, BH	RDC		SS	DR, PD	DS						
Inside Out 2	KM	MLF	PD			MN, PD							
Elio	DmS, MdS, AdM		BP			PD, MaD							
Hoppers	DC	DC				PD, NP							
Toy Story 5	AS, KH	AS, KH	JdR			PD,							

== Original short films ==
Film title	Director	Co-Director	Writer	Voiced character(s)	Animator	Editorial Department	Producer/Executive Producer	Production Designer	Art Department	Sound	Story Artist	Visual Effects
The Adventures of André & Wally B.	ARS		ARS		JL, WR					BB		WR, EFO, EC, TP, LC, TD
Luxo Jr.	JL		JL				JL, WR			GR		JL, WR
Red's Dream	JL		JL		JL, WR					GR		WR, RC
Tin Toy	JL		JL		WR		WR			GR		
Knick Knack	JL		JL							GR		
Geri's Game	JaP		JaP	BP	AM, PD, JaP		JL, EC		JeR			
For the Birds	RE		JaP	RE	AM, JFM		JL					
Boundin'	BL	RLG	BL	BL			OS, JL	BL		TM	BL	
One Man Band	AJ, MA		AJ, MA			RDC	OS, JL, BB	RDC	PS			
Lifted	GR		GR		AJ, GCS		KS, JL			GR		AJ, DF
Presto	DoS		DoS		GCS		JL, AS	HJ	TN			
Partly Cloudy	PS		PS				KeR, JL, AS					
Day & Night	TN		TN				KeR, JL					
La Luna	ErC		ErC				KeR, JL		DLM			NP
The Blue Umbrella	SU		SU				JL		KOB			MO
Lava	JFM		JFM				JL					MO
Sanjay's Super Team	SjP		SjP				NPG, JL					
Piper	AlB		AlB				MaS, JL, AS					
Lou	DM		DM				DaM, JL, PD					NP
Bao	DmS		DmS				JL, PD					
Purl	KL		KL				LiC					
Smash and Grab	BnL		BnL				DaM, LiC					
Kitbull	RS		RS				LiC				RS	
Float	BAR		BAR				LiC					
Wind	EdC		EdC				LiC					
Loop	EM		EM				LiC					
Out	SCH		SCH				LiC					
Burrow	MdS		MdS				LiC					
Twenty Something	AC		AC				LiC					
Nona	LC		LC, MW				LiC					
Self	SKH		SKH				LiC					

== Shorts based on feature films ==
Film title	Director	Co-Director	Writer	Voiced character(s)	Animator	Editorial Department	Producer/Executive Producer	Production Designer	Art Department	Sound	Story Artist	Visual Effects
Mike's New Car	RLG, PD		JeP, RLG, PD, RoG		JFM, JK		JL			TM		
Exploring the Reef	RLG		JeP, RLG, BP				OS, AS, JL					DF
Mr. Incredible and Pals	RLG		RLG, BB	PD			BB, OS					
Jack-Jack Attack	BB		BB, TN, MA	BL		SS	OS, JL					
Mater and the Ghostlight	JL	DS	JL, JhR, DS				DKA, MN					
Your Friend the Rat	JC		JC, JeP	PS			BB, JL, BrL		TN			
BURN-E	AM		AM, AS	AM	AM		GS, JL, AS					DF
Dug's Special Mission	RDC		BP, RDC	BP, PD, JeR			GS, PD, JL					MO
George & A.J.	JsC		JsC	SP, BP, PS			GS, PD, JoR					
Hawaiian Vacation	GR		JaK, GR	JeP, BL, JdR, AM			GS, JL					
Small Fry	AM		AM, JL	AM, TN, JdR, JsC, PS			JL					
Partysaurus Rex	MW		MW, JL	JdR, MW, AM			JL					
The Legend of Mor'du	BnL		SP, BnL	SP			GS, JL, MA					
Party Central	KM		KM, AuM, AdM	PS, KM			JL, DS, PD	RK				
Riley's First Date?	JsC		JsC, BAR	JsC, PD			MN, JL, PD, JoR	RE				
Auntie Edna	TM		TM	BB			BB, MS		RB		RB	
Lamp Life	VLaP		VLaP									
22 vs. Earth	KN		JsC									
Ciao Alberto	KH		KH, MdeC, SM									
Carl's Date	BP		BP	BP								
