= Domee Shi =

Canadian filmmaker (born 1989)

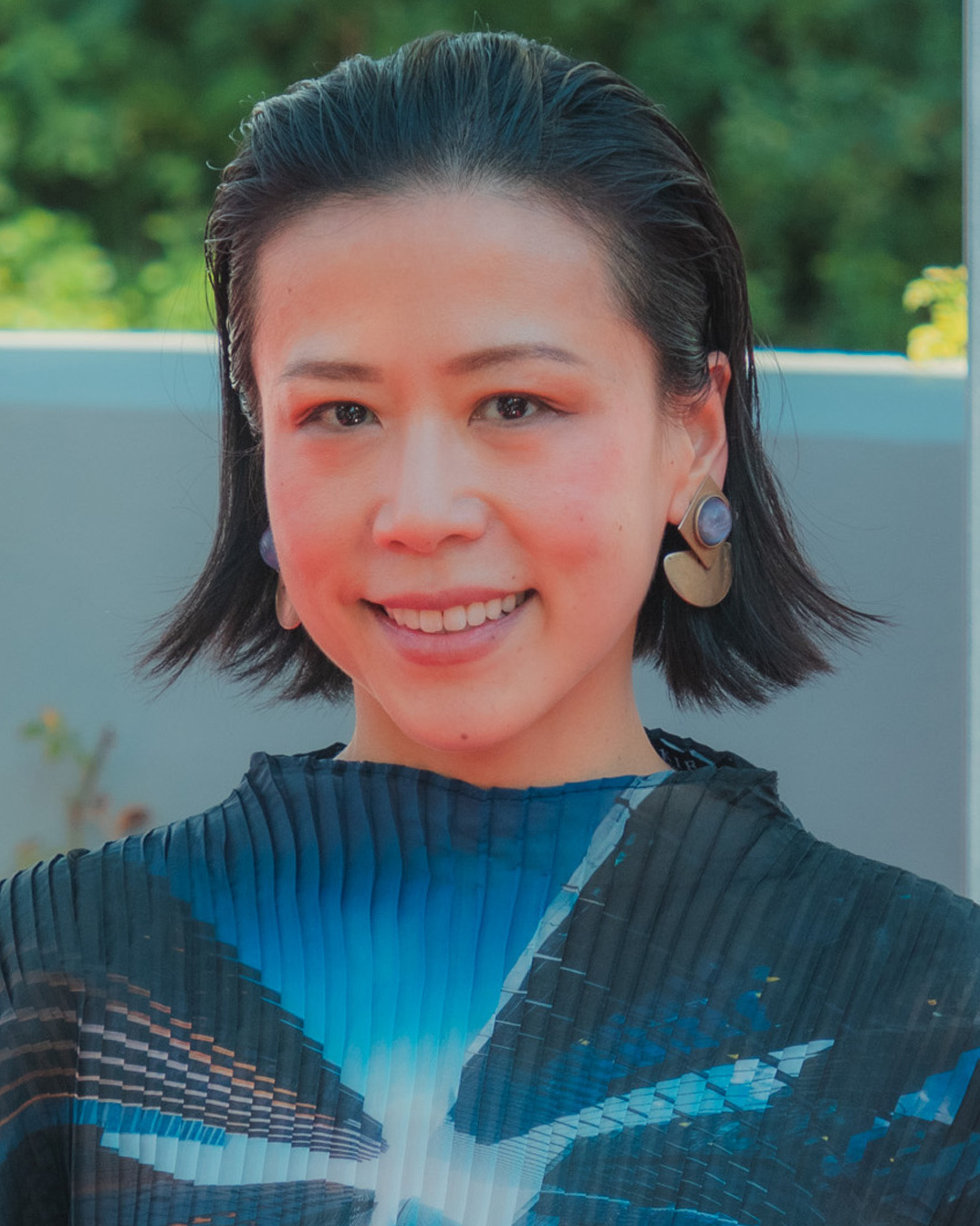
- Shi in 2026
- Born: Shi Zhiyu (石之予); 8 September 1989 (age 37); Chongqing, China
- Citizenship: Canada
- Education: Sheridan College (BA)
- Occupations: Animator; film director; screenwriter; storyboard artist
- Years active: 2010−present
- Employer: Pixar Animation Studios (2011–present)

Domee Shi (/ˈdoʊmi/; Chinese: 石之予; pinyin: Shí Zhīyǔ; born September 8, 1989) is a Canadian animator, filmmaker, screenwriter, and voice actress. She has directed the short film Bao (2018) and the feature films Turning Red (2022) and Elio (2025).

Shi began working for Pixar in 2011 as a storyboard artist, contributing to multiple films, including Inside Out (2015), The Good Dinosaur (2015), and Toy Story 4 (2019). She was also an additional story artist for Incredibles 2 (2018).

For Bao, Shi won an Academy Award for Best Animated Short Film at the 91st Academy Awards, and also earned nominations for the 43rd Annie Awards, the International Online Cinema Awards, and the Tribeca Film Festival. She was also nominated for the Academy Award for Best Animated Feature for both Turning Red and Elio.

== Early life ==
Shi was born on 8 September 1989 in Chongqing, Sichuan (now Chongqing municipality) as an only child before immigrating to Canada at the age of two with her parents. She spent six months in Newfoundland before moving to Toronto, where she grew up learning about art from her father. She was influenced by her father, who had been a college professor of fine arts and a landscape painter in China. Shi took inspiration and guidance from her mother's personality when directing Bao and Turning Red. Shi recalls that "My Chinese mom was always making sure I never wandered away too far, that I was safe." One such moment, that eventually made its way into Turning Red, was when Shi was in her adolescence: at a time when she wanted to fit in with her peers, Shi and her friends were together at school when one of them spotted Shi's mother lurking behind a tree, making sure Shi was doing alright. During her childhood, Shi watched many Studio Ghibli and Disney films, which exposed her to Asian cinema and animation.

As a high school student, Shi watched anime, read manga, and became the Vice President of her school's anime club. She joined online art communities and uploaded her fan artwork to DeviantArt. This became her first exposure to an environment of like-minded people that helped her establish a network with other artists. "I could follow artists, and I could email them. In the past, you'd have to be in California or know a guy who was friends with this other guy that worked at Disney or something," said Shi. Shi was motivated to enroll at Sheridan College because many of her favorite artists had attended there.

At Sheridan, Shi studied animation, graduating in 2011. During her second year at Sheridan, she enrolled in a course taught by Nancy Beiman, whose class she credits for her pursuit of storyboarding. Shi created a short film for an assignment during her last year at Sheridan. In 2009, she undertook an internship with Chuck Gammage Animation as a clean-up artist, inbetweener, storyboard artist, and animator.

== Career ==
After graduating, Shi worked briefly as a cartooning instructor with an emphasis on character design and comic book creation. In 2011, she accepted a three-month internship at Pixar as a storyboard artist. This was her second attempt (her father was the one who encouraged her to apply again), having initially been turned down by the animation studio and others, such as Disney and DreamWorks. On her internship at Pixar and eventually full-time job, Shi states, "I felt that my voice was valued early on in my career, which is rare." Shi wrote an animated webcomic series titled My Food Fantasies in 2014, in which she drew "outlandish" situations involving food. Shi later said that she developed her interest in writing stories about food while making My Food Fantasies. The first feature film she worked on with Pixar was Inside Out (2015), on which she served as a storyboard artist. After briefly working on The Good Dinosaur, Shi began working on Toy Story 4 in 2015 (the film where she joined Pixar's Senior Creative Team). She also drew storyboards for the 2018 film Incredibles 2, where she worked on a sequence featuring the characters Jack-Jack and Edna Mode.

On her career as a Chinese Canadian female director, Shi says that through her work as a filmmaker, she strives for the industry to reach the point where people are identified first as artists, and second by gender and ethnicity, stating that it gets old fast when she gets asked how it feels to be an Asian woman. "My first identity is that I'm a nerd! I just wanted to make something that I could nerd out about with my colleagues and friends, and share with other nerdy people around the world."

=== Directing ===
The short film Bao (2018) was developed as a "side-project" before and during Shi's full-time work on Inside Out. Bao, alongside two other projects, was eventually pitched to her mentor, Pete Docter, and Pixar for support. Bao was approved in 2015, making Shi the first woman to direct a short film for the studio. The eight-minute short debuted at the 2018 Tribeca Film Festival, where it preceded Incredibles 2 in theaters. Shi won the Academy Award for Best Animated Short Film for Bao, becoming the first woman of color to win the award.

On May 8, 2018, it was reported that Shi was directing a feature film at Pixar. On November 26, 2018, Shi confirmed that she was working on a film at the studio. Shi also said that the film was in early stages of development, with the story still being worked on, and that she was "really excited to play in this new 90-minute film format." On January 1, 2019, Shi said that she planned the film to be "entertaining and emotional." On December 9, 2020, Shi's film was announced with the title Turning Red. It was originally scheduled to be released in theaters on March 11, 2022, but due to rising cases of SARS-CoV-2 Omicron variant, it was instead released direct-to-streaming on Disney+ on the same date. Disney said Turning Red was the number one streaming title on Disney+, and in early April 2022, Pixar promoted Shi to vice president of creative, alongside Andrew Stanton, Peter Sohn and Dan Scanlon. With Turning Red's success, Shi has officially become the first woman to solo direct a film in Pixar's 36-year history.

On October 5, 2022, Shi was confirmed to be developing another original Pixar feature film. The Variety article states that Shi would not be focusing on the trials and tribulations of mother-daughter relationships in immigrant families for her new film. On June 12, 2024, Pixar's Chief Creative Officer Pete Docter revealed that Shi was working on Elio, set for release on June 13, 2025. In August 2024, Shi was officially confirmed to be directing the film alongside Madeline Sharafian, replacing original director Adrian Molina. Elio was Shi's next project before her next as-of-yet untitled original film. In 2026, it was reported that Shi's third original film would be a musical.

== Influences ==
Shi is influenced by her father's art, as he was her art teacher while growing up. "Like, I asked him what he thought [of the film] and he said, 'I really liked it, but I also have notes for you.' And I was like, Ah, that's my classic dad," Shi said.

In an interview with Now Magazine, Shi said that the animated films My Neighbors the Yamadas (1999) and Spirited Away (2001) were her influences when creating Bao. Her parents, however, were her biggest influences when directing Bao. Shi notes that her mother's overprotectiveness towards her when she was young was the major inspiration for the animated short, and particularly for the ending, in which Shi says, "I wanted to use this short as a way to explore that relationship between an over-protective mom and a baby dumpling and show how the bittersweetness of letting something go even though you love it so much."

For Turning Red, Shi was inspired by the teenage girl's experience in navigating adolescence and all the weirdness that comes with it, incorporating her own personal experiences and aspects of her hometown, Toronto. In an interview with The New York Times, Shi says, "It's a side of teen girls that you never got to see. We are just as awkward and sweaty and lusty and excited as any boy." For the film, Shi was also inspired to include a more diverse cast, with an article by Vanity Fair stating as such: "Shi was also vigilant about creating a diverse cast of human characters to surround Mei, including her Chinese Canadian family and multicultural Asian friends." During production, Shi was also careful to avoid the trope of 'characters of color being turned into nonhuman forms' in Turning Red by giving the giant red panda that Mei turns into a metaphorical meaning. Shi says it's "a metaphor for all the messiness inside of her that wants to come out."

Shi says that most of her ideas come from specific cultures around her. Because audiences started to appreciate other stories with different background and culture after Sanjay's Super Team and Coco, Shi thinks it important to draw upon various sources and backgrounds in order to create uniqueness in film.

== Filmography ==
=== Feature films ===
| Year | Title | Director | Writer | Executive Producer | Story Artist | Additional Voices | Pixar Senior Creative Team |
|---|---|---|---|---|---|---|---|
| 2015 | Inside Out | No | No | No | Yes | No | No |
| 2015 | The Good Dinosaur | No | No | No | Yes | No | No |
| 2018 | Incredibles 2 | No | No | No | Additional | No | No |
| 2019 | Toy Story 4 | No | No | No | Yes | No | Yes |
| 2020 | Onward | No | No | No | No | No | Yes |
| 2020 | Soul | No | No | No | No | No | Yes |
| 2021 | Luca | No | No | No | No | No | Yes |
| 2022 | Turning Red | Yes | Yes | No | No | Yes | Yes |
| 2022 | Lightyear | No | No | No | No | No | Yes |
| 2023 | Elemental | No | No | No | No | No | Yes |
| 2024 | Inside Out 2 | No | No | No | No | No | Yes |
| 2025 | Elio | Yes | Story | No | No | Yes | Yes |
| 2026 | Hoppers | No | No | Partial | No | No | Yes |
| 2026 | Toy Story 5 | No | No | No | No | No | Yes |

=== Short films ===
| Year | Title | Director | Writer | Other | Notes |
|---|---|---|---|---|---|
| 2018 | Bao | Yes | Yes | Yes | Story Artist |
| 2019 | Purl | No | No | Yes | Voice of Office Ladies |
| 2019 | Kitbull | No | No | Yes | Story Trust |
| 2021 | Twenty Something | No | No | Yes | Story Trust |
| 2021 | Nona | No | No | Yes | Special Thanks |
| 2022 | Cars on the Road | No | No | Yes | Special Thanks, Pixar Senior Creative Team |
| 2024 | Self | No | No | Yes | Story Trust |

=== Television ===
| Year | Title | Animator | Pixar Senior Creative Team |
|---|---|---|---|
| 2014–2015 | Wander Over Yonder | Yes | No |
| 2024 | Dream Productions | No | Yes |
| 2025 | Win or Lose | No | Yes |

=== Disney+ Original Specials ===
| Year | Title | Role |
|---|---|---|
| 2021 | A Spark Story | Herself |
| 2021 | Pixar 2021 Disney+ Day Special | Herself |
| 2022 | Embrace the Panda: Making 'Turning Red' | Herself |

== Awards and nominations ==
Awards and nominations received by Domee Shi
| Award | Year (Note: Indicates the year of ceremony) | Category | Nominated work | Result | Ref. |
|---|---|---|---|---|---|
| Academy Awards | 2019 | Best Animated Short Film | Bao | Won | |
| Academy Awards | 2023 | Best Animated Feature | Turning Red | Nominated | |
| Academy Awards | 2026 | Best Animated Feature | Elio | Nominated | |
| Annie Awards | 2016 | Storyboarding in an Animated Feature Production | Inside Out | Nominated | |
| Annie Awards | 2023 | Best Animated Feature | Turning Red | Nominated | |
| Annie Awards | 2026 | Best Animated Feature | Elio | Nominated | |
| Annie Awards | 2023 | Outstanding Achievement for Directing in an Animated Feature Production | Turning Red | Nominated | |
| Annie Awards | 2023 | Outstanding Achievement for Writing in an Animated Feature Production | Turning Red | Nominated | |
| Alliance of Women Film Journalists Awards | 2023 | Best Animated Film | Turning Red | Nominated | |
| Alliance of Women Film Journalists Awards | 2023 | Best Woman Screenwriter | Turning Red | Nominated | |
| Austin Film Critics Association Awards | 2023 | Best Animated Film | Turning Red | Nominated | |
| Austin Film Critics Association Awards | 2023 | Best First Film | Turning Red | Nominated | |
| Boston Society of Film Critics Awards | 2022 | Best Animated Film | Turning Red | Won | |
| British Academy Film Awards | 2023 | Best Animated Film | Turning Red | Nominated | |
| British Academy Film Awards | 2026 | Best Animated Film | Elio | Nominated | |
| Chicago Film Critics Association Awards | 2022 | Best Animated Film | Turning Red | Nominated | |
| Critics' Choice Movie Awards | 2023 | Best Animated Feature | Turning Red | Nominated | |
| Critics' Choice Movie Awards | 2026 | Best Animated Feature | Elio | Nominated | |
| Dorian Awards | 2023 | Animated Film of the Year | Turning Red | Nominated | |
| Florida Film Critics Circle Awards | 2022 | Best Animated Film | Turning Red | Won | |
| Georgia Film Critics Association Awards | 2023 | Best Animated Film | Turning Red | Nominated | |
| Golden Globe Awards | 2023 | Best Animated Feature Film | Turning Red | Nominated | |
| Golden Globe Awards | 2026 | Best Animated Feature Film | Elio | Nominated | |
| Hollywood Critics Association Awards | 2023 | Best Animated Film | Turning Red | Nominated | |
| Hollywood Critics Association Awards | 2023 | Best First Feature | Turning Red | Nominated | |
| Hollywood Critics Association Midseason Film Awards | 2022 | Best Picture | Turning Red | Nominated | |
| Houston Film Critics Society Awards | 2023 | Best Animated Feature | Turning Red | Nominated | |
| NAACP Image Awards | 2023 | Outstanding Animated Motion Picture | Turning Red | Nominated | |
| Nickelodeon Kids' Choice Awards | 2023 | Favorite Animated Movie | Turning Red | Nominated | |
| Online Film Critics Society | 2023 | Best Animated Feature | Turning Red | Nominated | |
| Online Film Critics Society | 2023 | Best Debut Feature | Turning Red | Nominated | |
| San Diego Film Critics Society Awards | 2023 | Best Animated Film | Turning Red | Runner-up | |
| San Francisco Bay Area Film Critics Circle | 2023 | Best Animated Feature | Turning Red | Nominated | |
| Satellite Awards | 2023 | Best Motion Picture – Animated or Mixed Media | Turning Red | Nominated | |
| Satellite Awards | 2026 | Best Motion Picture – Animated or Mixed Media | Elio | Won | |
| Seattle Film Critics Society Awards | 2023 | Best Animated Feature | Turning Red | Nominated | |
| St. Louis Gateway Film Critics Association Awards | 2022 | Best Animated Film | Turning Red | Nominated | |
| Toronto Film Critics Association | 2023 | Best Animated Film | Turning Red | Won | |
| Toronto Film Critics Association | 2023 | Best First Feature | Turning Red | Runner-up | |
| Visual Effects Society Awards | 2023 | Outstanding Visual Effects in an Animated Feature | Turning Red | Nominated | |
| Washington D.C. Area Film Critics Association Awards | 2022 | Best Animated Feature | Turning Red | Nominated | |
| Washington D.C. Area Film Critics Association Awards | 2025 | Best Animated Feature | Elio | Nominated | |
