= San Diego Film Critics Society Award for Best Animated Film =

Annual US film award

The San Diego Film Critics Society Award for Best Animated Feature is an annual film award given by the San Diego Film Critics Society.

== Winners ==
=== 2003-2008 ===
Year	Film	Director(s)
2003	The Triplets of Belleville (Les triplettes de Belleville)	Sylvain Chomet
2004	The Incredibles	Brad Bird
2005	Howl's Moving Castle (Hauru no ugoku shiro)	Hayao Miyazaki
2006	not awarded	
2007	Ratatouille	Brad Bird
2008	WALL-E	Andrew Stanton

=== 2009-2019 ===
Year	Film	Director(s)	Nominees				
2009	Up	Pete Docter	9	Shane Acker Coraline	Henry Selick Fantastic Mr. Fox	Wes Anderson Monsters vs. Aliens	Conrad Vernon, Rob Letterman
2010	Toy Story 3	Lee Unkrich	Despicable Me	Pierre Coffin, Chris Renaud How To Train Your Dragon	Chris Sanders, Dean DeBlois The Illusionist (L'Illusionniste)	Sylvain Chomet Tangled	Nathan Greno, Byron Howard
2011	Arthur Christmas	Sarah Smith	Happy Feet Two	George Miller Kung Fu Panda 2	Jennifer Yuh Nelson Rango	Gore Verbinski Winnie the Pooh	Stephen Anderson, Don Hall
2012	ParaNorman	Sam Fell and Chris Butler	Brave	Mark Andrews, Brenda Chapman Frankenweenie	Tim Burton Rise of the Guardians	Peter Ramsey Wreck-It Ralph	Rich Moore
2013	The Wind Rises	Hayao Miyazaki	The Croods	Chris Sanders, Kirk DeMicco Despicable Me 2	Pierre Coffin, Chris Renaud Frozen	Chris Buck, Jennifer Lee Get a Horse!	Lauren MacMullan
2014	The Boxtrolls	Graham Annable and Anthony Stacchi	Big Hero 6	Don Hall, Chris Williams How to Train Your Dragon 2	Dean DeBlois The Lego Movie	Phil Lord, Chris Miller The Nut Job	Peter Lepeniotis
2015	Anomalisa	Charlie Kaufman and Duke Johnson	The Good Dinosaur	Peter Sohn Inside Out	Pete Docter, Ronnie del Carmen The Peanuts Movie	Steve Martino Shaun the Sheep Movie	Richard Starzak, Mark Burton
2016	Kubo and the Two Strings	Travis Knight	April and the Extraordinary World (Avril et le Monde Truqué)	Christian Desmares, Franck Ekinci Long Way North (Tout en haut du monde)	Rémi Chayé Moana	Ron Clements, John Musker Zootopia	Byron Howard, Rich Moore
2017	My Life as a Zucchini	Claude Barras	The Boss Baby	Tom McGrath Coco	Lee Unkrich Loving Vincent	Dorota Kobiela, Hugh Welchman My Entire High School Sinking Into the Sea	Dash Shaw
2018	Isle of Dogs	Wes Anderson	Have a Nice Day	Liu Jian Incredibles 2	Brad Bird Ralph Breaks the Internet	Rich Moore & Phil Johnston Spider-Man: Into the Spider-Verse	Bob Persichetti, Peter Ramsey and Rodney Rothman
2019	I Lost My Body	Jérémy Clapin	Abominable	Jill Culton How to Train Your Dragon: The Hidden World	Dean DeBlois Missing Link	Chris Butler Toy Story 4	Josh Cooley

=== 2020s ===
Year	Film	Director(s)	Nominees				
2020	Wolfwalkers	Tomm Moore and Ross Stewart	Onward	Dan Scanlon Over the Moon	Glen Keane Soul	Pete Docter Trolls World Tour	Walt Dohrn
2021	Luca	Enrico Casarosa and Jesse Andrews	Encanto	Byron Howard Flee	Jonas Poher Rasmussen The Mitchells vs. the Machines	Mike Rianda Raya and the Last Dragon	Don Hall
2022	Guillermo del Toro's Pinocchio	Guillermo del Toro and Mark Gustafson	Marcel the Shell with Shoes On	Dean Fleischer Camp Puss in Boots: The Last Wish	Joel Crawford Turning Red	Domee Shi Wendell & Wild	Henry Selick
2023	The Boy and the Heron (Kimitachi wa Dō Ikiru ka)	Hayao Miyazaki	Chicken Run: Dawn of the Nugget	Sam Fell Nimona	Nick Bruno and Troy Quane Robot Dreams	Pablo Berger Spider-Man: Across the Spider-Verse	Joaquim Dos Santos, Kemp Powers, and Justin K. Thompson
2024	Flow	Gints Zilbalodis	Memoir of a Snail	Adam Elliot Transformers One	Josh Cooley Wallace & Gromit: Vengeance Most Fowl	Merlin Crossingham and Nick Park The Wild Robot	Chris Sanders
2025	KPop Demon Hunters	Maggie Kang and Chris Appelhans	Little Amélie or the Character of Rain	Maïlys Vallade and Liane-Cho Han Elio	Madeline Sharafian, Domee Shi and Adrian Molina Predator: Killer of Killers	Dan Trachtenberg Zootopia 2	Jared Bush and Byron Howard
