= Washington D.C. Area Film Critics Association Award for Best Animated Feature =

Annual US film award

The Washington D.C. Area Film Critics Association Award for Best Animated Feature is an annual award given out by the Washington D.C. Area Film Critics Association. Toy Story is the only franchise with multiple wins, winning two times for Toy Story 3 (2010) and Toy Story 4 (2019).

== Winners and nominees ==
=== 2000s ===
Year	Film	Director(s)
2002	Lilo & Stitch	Chris Sanders and Dean DeBlois
2002	Ice Age	Chris Wedge
2003	Finding Nemo	Andrew Stanton and Lee Unkrich
2003	Brother Bear	Aaron Blaise and Robert Walker
2003	The Triplets of Belleville	Sylvain Chomet
2003	Looney Tunes: Back in Action	Joe Dante
2003	Rugrats Go Wild	Norton Virgien and John Eng
2004	The Incredibles	Brad Bird
2005	Wallace & Gromit: The Curse of the Were-Rabbit	Nick Park and Steve Box
2005	Chicken Little	Mark Dindal
2005	Corpse Bride	Tim Burton, Mike Johnson
2005	Madagascar	Eric Darnell and Tom McGrath
2005	Robots	Chris Wedge
2006	Happy Feet	George Miller
2007	Ratatouille	Brad Bird
2008	WALL-E	Andrew Stanton
2009	Up	Pete Docter
2009	9	Shane Acker
2009	Coraline	Henry Selick
2009	Fantastic Mr. Fox	Wes Anderson
2009	Ponyo	Hayao Miyazaki

=== 2010s ===
Year	Film	Director(s)
2010	Toy Story 3	Lee Unkrich
2010	Despicable Me	Pierre Coffin, Chris Renaud
2010	How To Train Your Dragon	Chris Sanders, Dean DeBlois
2010	Shrek Forever After	Mike Mitchell
2010	Tangled	Nathan Greno, Byron Howard
2010	Megamind	Tom McGrath
2011	Rango	Gore Verbinski
2011	The Adventures of Tintin	Steven Spielberg
2011	Puss in Boots	Chris Miller
2011	Arthur Christmas	Sarah Smith
2011	Winnie the Pooh	Stephen Anderson and Don Hall
2012	ParaNorman	Sam Fell and Chris Butler
2012	Brave	Mark Andrews, Brenda Chapman
2012	Frankenweenie	Tim Burton
2012	Rise of the Guardians	Peter Ramsey, William Joyce
2012	Wreck-It Ralph	Rich Moore
2013	Frozen	Chris Buck and Jennifer Lee
2013	Turbo	David Soren
2013	Despicable Me 2	Pierre Coffin, Chris Renaud
2013	The Wind Rises	Hayao Miyazaki
2013	Monsters University	Dan Scanlon
2014	The Lego Movie	Phil Lord and Christopher Miller
2014	Big Hero 6	Don Hall, Chris Williams
2014	The Book of Life	Jorge Gutierrez
2014	The Boxtrolls	Anthony Stacchi, Graham Annable
2014	How to Train Your Dragon 2	Dean DeBlois
2014	Rio 2	Carlos Saldanha
2014	Mr. Peabody and Sherman	Rob Minkoff
2015	Inside Out	Pete Docter
2015	The Good Dinosaur	Peter Sohn
2015	Hotel Transylvania 2	Genndy Tartakovsky
2015	The Peanuts Movie	Steve Martino
2015	Shaun the Sheep Movie	Richard Starzak, Mark Burton
2016	Kubo and the Two Strings	Travis Knight
2016	Sausage Party	Conrad Vernon, Greg Tiernan
2016	Finding Dory	Andrew Stanton
2016	Moana	Ron Clements, John Musker
2016	Zootopia	Byron Howard, Rich Moore
2017	Coco	Lee Unkrich
2017	The Breadwinner	Nora Twomey
2017	Despicable Me 3	Pierre Coffin, Kyle Balda
2017	The Lego Batman Movie	Chris McKay
2017	Loving Vincent	Dorota Kobiela, Hugh Welchman
2017	The Boss Baby	Tom McGrath
2017	Cars 3	Brian Fee
2018	Isle of Dogs	Wes Anderson
2018	Incredibles 2	Brad Bird
2018	Mirai	Mamoru Hosoda
2018	Ralph Breaks the Internet	Phil Johnston, Rich Moore
2018	Spider-Man: Into the Spider-Verse	Bob Persichetti, Peter Ramsey, Rodney Rothman
2018	The Grinch	Scott Mosier and Yarrow Cheney
2018	Early Man	Nick Park
2019	Toy Story 4	Josh Cooley
2019	Frozen 2	Chris Buck, Jennifer Lee
2019	How to Train Your Dragon: The Hidden World	Dean DeBlois
2019	Klaus	Sergio Pablos
2019	Missing Link	Chris Butler

=== 2020s ===
Year	Film	Director(s)
2020	Soul	Pete Docter
2020	The Croods: A New Age	Joel Crawford
2020	Onward	Dan Scanlon
2020	Over the Moon	Glen Keane
2020	Wolfwalkers	Tomm Moore and Ross Stewart
2021	The Mitchells vs. the Machines	Mike Rianda
2021	Encanto	Jared Bush and Byron Howard
2021	Flee	Jonas Poher Rasmussen
2021	Luca	Enrico Casarosa
2021	Raya and the Last Dragon	Don Hall and Carlos López Estrada
2022	Guillermo del Toro's Pinocchio	Guillermo del Toro
2022	Apollo 10 1/2: A Space Age Childhood	Richard Linklater
2022	Marcel the Shell with Shoes On	Dean Fleischer Camp
2022	Turning Red	Domee Shi
2022	Wendell & Wild	Henry Selick
2023	Spider-Man: Across the Spider-Verse	Kemp Powers and Joaquim Dos Santos
2023	Elemental	Peter Sohn
2023	Nimona	Nick Bruno and Troy Quane
2023	Teenage Mutant Ninja Turtles: Mutant Mayhem	Jeff Rowe
2023	The Boy and the Heron	Hayao Miyazaki
2024	The Wild Robot	Chris Sanders
2024	Flow	Gints Zilbalodis
2024	Inside Out 2	Kelsey Mann
2024	Memoir of a Snail	Adam Elliot
2024	Wallace and Gromit: Vengeance Most Fowl	Merlin Crossingham and Nick Park
2025	KPop Demon Hunters	Maggie Kang and Chris Appelhans
2025	Arco	Ugo Bienvenu
2025	Elio	Madeline Sharafian, Domee Shi and Adrian Molina
2025	Little Amélie or the Character of Rain	Maïlys Vallade and Liane-Cho Han
2025	Zootopia 2	Jared Bush and Byron Howard

== See also ==
- Academy Award for Best Animated Feature
- Golden Globe Award for Best Animated Feature Film
- Annie Award for Best Animated Feature
- BAFTA Award for Best Animated Film
- Critics' Choice Movie Award for Best Animated Feature
- Kids' Choice Award for Favorite Animated Movie
