= SparkShorts =

Series of Pixar animated independent short films

- Created by: Pixar
- Original work: Purl (2019)
- Owner: The Walt Disney Company
- Years: 2019–2024

Films and television
- Short films: Purl (2019); Smash and Grab (2019); Kitbull (2019); Float (2019); Wind (2019); Loop (2020); Out (2020); Burrow (2020); Twenty Something (2021); Nona (2021); Self (2024)

Audio
- Soundtrack: See below

SparkShorts is a series of American independent animated short films produced by Pixar Animation Studios. It consists of a program in which Pixar's employees are given six months and limited budgets to develop animated short films that were originally released on Pixar's YouTube channel, and later on Disney+.

Producer Lindsey Collins confirmed that SparkShorts replaced the need to pair short films with theatrical films; admitting that she felt "torn" over the decision.

Purl, the first short of the SparkShorts program, was released at SIGGRAPH on August 14, 2018, while the next two shorts, Smash and Grab and Kitbull, were both given a limited release at the El Capitan Theater on January 8, 2019, alongside the former. Purl was officially released on February 4, 2019, on YouTube while Smash and Grab and Kitbull were released on February 11 and 18, respectively. Subsequent shorts were released on November 12, 2019, on Disney+, beginning with Float, rather than on YouTube.

== Development ==
Pixar first announced the SparkShorts program on January 18, 2019. The program consists of giving employees at Pixar six months and a limited budget to develop indie short films, all of them based on personal experiences. The program was developed in order to find new filmmakers at Pixar. Bobby Rubio, writer/director of the SparkShort film Float, described the program as "different film from the kinds of films" developed at Pixar, while Lindsey Collins said that the shorts are referred to as SparkShorts because Pixar "[wants] to discover that creative spark" in its employees. Jim Morris said: "The SparkShorts program is designed to discover new storytellers, explore new storytelling techniques, and experiment with new production workflows", adding that it "[provides] an opportunity to unlock the potential of individual artists and their inventive filmmaking approaches on a smaller scale than [Pixar's] normal fare". The last SparkShort was released on February 2, 2024.

== Films ==
#	Film	Release date	Director(s)	Writer(s)		Producer(s)	Executive producer(s)	Editor(s)	Composer(s)
#	Film	Release date	Director(s)	Screenplay	Story	Producer(s)	Executive producer(s)	Editor(s)	Composer(s)
1	Purl	February 4, 2019	Kristen Lester		Michael Daley, Bradley Furnish, Lester & James Robertson	Gillian Libbert-Duncan	Lindsey Collins	Furnish	Pinar Toprak
2	Smash and Grab	February 11, 2019	Brian Larsen			David Lally	Lindsey Collins, Mary Alice Drumm & Dana Murray	Nicole Vanderneut	Barney Jones
3	Kitbull	February 18, 2019	Rosana Sullivan			Kathryn Hendrickson	Lindsey Collins	Katie Schaefer Bishop	Andrew Jimenez
4	Float	November 12, 2019	Bobby Rubio			Krissy Cababa	Lindsey Collins	Gregory Amundson	Jones
5	Wind	December 13, 2019	Edwin Chang			Jesús MartÍnez	Lindsey Collins	Tim Fox	Jimenez
6	Loop	January 10, 2020	Erica Milsom		Adam Burke, Matthias De Clercq & Milsom	Michael Warch & Krissy Cababa	Lindsey Collins	Jason Brodkey	Mark Orton
7	Out	May 22, 2020	Steven Clay Hunter			Max Sachar	Lindsey Collins & David Lally	Noah Newman	Jake Monaco
8	Burrow	December 25, 2020	Madeline Sharafian			Mike Capbarat	Lindsey Collins & David Lally	Anna Wolitzky	—N/a
9	Twenty Something	September 10, 2021	Aphton Corbin			Erik Langley	Nicole Paradis Grindle & Micheal K. O'Brien	Amera Rizk	ASTU
10	Nona	September 17, 2021	Louis Gonzales		Mike Wu	Courtney Casper Kent	Nicole Paradis Grindle & Micheal K. O'Brien	Jennifer Jew	Cristy Road Carrera
11	Self	February 2, 2024	Searit Kahsay Huluf			Eric Rosales	Andrew Beall & Katherine Sarafian	Will Starling	Jennifer Rowekamp

=== Purl ===
An anthropomorphic ball of yarn named Purl becomes the first ball of yarn to work at a company called B.R.O. Capital, but is discriminated against by her human coworkers. Purl promptly changes her appearance and personality in order to fit in, but soon finds out it may not be the best idea to do so.

=== Smash and Grab ===
Set on a futuristic Mars-like planet, two worker robots, named Smash and Grab respectively, must fight their way to freedom after choosing to escape from their exhausting work routine.

=== Kitbull ===
An independent kitten forms an unlikely friendship with an abused pit bull, whom he eventually chooses to help escape from his owners.

This short accompanied Turning Red's 2024 U.S. theatrical release.

=== Float ===
Upon discovering his son's ability to fly, a father tries to hide his son's ability from the world. When his son's ability eventually becomes public though, the father must choose between going on the run or accepting his son.

=== Wind ===
A grandmother and her grandson find themselves scavenging debris after being trapped together in an endless chasm, and soon realize their dream of escaping.

=== Loop ===
A non-verbal girl with autism and a chatty boy must learn to understand each other in order to fulfill a canoeing trip in an urban lake during summer camp.

=== Out ===
A young gay man who has not yet come out to his parents unexpectedly has his mind magically swapped with his dog's.

=== Burrow ===
A young rabbit tries to build the burrow of her dreams, becoming embarrassed each time she accidentally digs into a neighbor's home.

This short was originally intended to receive a wide theatrical release alongside Pixar's feature-length film Soul. While the theatrical release of both the short and feature were cancelled in countries where Disney+ was available, Burrow still played theatrically before Soul in countries where Disney+ was not available in December 2020. The short would play again before Soul for its U.S. theatrical release in 2024.

=== Twenty Something ===
The film examines the challenges and insecurities of 'adulting.' Some days you're nailing it, while other days, you're just a stack of kids hiding in a trench coat, hoping no one notices. The film's protagonist is Gia, who finds herself in this exact scenario the night of her 21st birthday.

=== Nona ===
A widowed grandmother named Nona plans to spend her day off by shutting out the world to watch her favorite TV show, E.W.W. Smashdown Wrestling. However, when her five-year-old granddaughter Renee is unexpectedly dropped off, Nona is caught between her two favorite things. Renee wants to play, while the normally-doting Nona wrestles with wanting to watch the Smashdown, leading to a decisive showdown between the two, and a loving compromise.

=== Self ===
A wooden doll who desperately wants to fit in makes an ill-fated wish upon a star, sparking a journey of self-discovery. Her desire to blend in with her peers leads her down a harmful path, challenging her perspective of both who she is and where she belongs. This film is Pixar's first hybrid stop-motion animation.

== Accolades ==
List of awards and nominations
Award	Date of ceremony	Category	Film	Result	Ref.
Academy Awards	February 9, 2020	Best Animated Short Film	Kitbull	Nominated	
Academy Awards	April 25, 2021	Best Animated Short Film	Out	Shortlisted	
Academy Awards	April 25, 2021	Best Animated Short Film	Burrow	Nominated	

== Themes ==
Purl was praised by many as an allegory for gender inequality and feminism, which Meghan Mehta of Study Breaks noted was "mature for Pixar's target audience". Alex Reif of Laughing Place said that Smash and Grab is "[a] story about two workers who don't get the same luxuries as those who control them". Nick Skillicorn of Idea to Value felt that the SparkShorts program "enables the staff to flex their creative muscles in new ways, and try ideas which would never be accepted into a feature-length film aimed at families".

== Music ==
Title	U.S. release date	Composer(s)	Label
Purl (Original Motion Picture Soundtrack)	March 15, 2019	Pinar Toprak	Walt Disney Records
Smash and Grab (Original Motion Picture Soundtrack)	April 5, 2019	Barney Jones	Walt Disney Records
Kitbull (Original Motion Picture Soundtrack)	April 23, 2019	Andrew Jimenez	Walt Disney Records
Float (Original Motion Picture Soundtrack)	February 28, 2020	Barney Jones	Walt Disney Records
Wind (Original Motion Picture Soundtrack)	February 28, 2020	Andrew Jimenez	Walt Disney Records
Loop (Original Motion Picture Soundtrack)	February 28, 2020	Mark Orton	Walt Disney Records
Out (Original Motion Picture Soundtrack)	July 3, 2020	Jake Monaco	Walt Disney Records
Burrow (Original Motion Picture Soundtrack)	December 25, 2020	—N/a	Walt Disney Records
Twenty Something (Original Motion Picture Soundtrack)	September 10, 2021	ASTU	Walt Disney Records
Nona (Original Motion Picture Soundtrack)	September 17, 2021	Cristy Road Carrera	Walt Disney Records
Self (Original Motion Picture Soundtrack)	February 2, 2024	Jennifer Rowekamp	Walt Disney Records

== Outside media ==
=== A Spark Story ===
On January 29, 2020, Disney announced that an untitled documentary series focusing on the SparkShorts series was in development for Disney+. The series, which provided "an immersive look at the next generation of Pixar filmmaker[s]", was executive-produced by Brian McGinn, Jason Sterman and David Gelb. On July 21, 2021, it was reported that the project was being redeveloped as a docu-film under the name A Spark Story, with McGinn, Sterman, and Gelb producing. Sterman also directed the film alongside Leanne Dare. Pixar produced the project alongside Supper Club. The documentary, charting the production of then-recent SparkShorts Twenty Something and Nona, was released on September 24, 2021.

== See also ==
- Indiewood
- Message picture
- Social issues
