= Lucroy =

Lucroy is a French surname. Notable people with the surname include:

- Janet Lucroy (born 1970), American visual artist
- Jonathan Lucroy (born 1986), American baseball player

== See also ==
- Luc Roy, Canadian actor
