= Peter Sohn =

American filmmaker (born 1977)

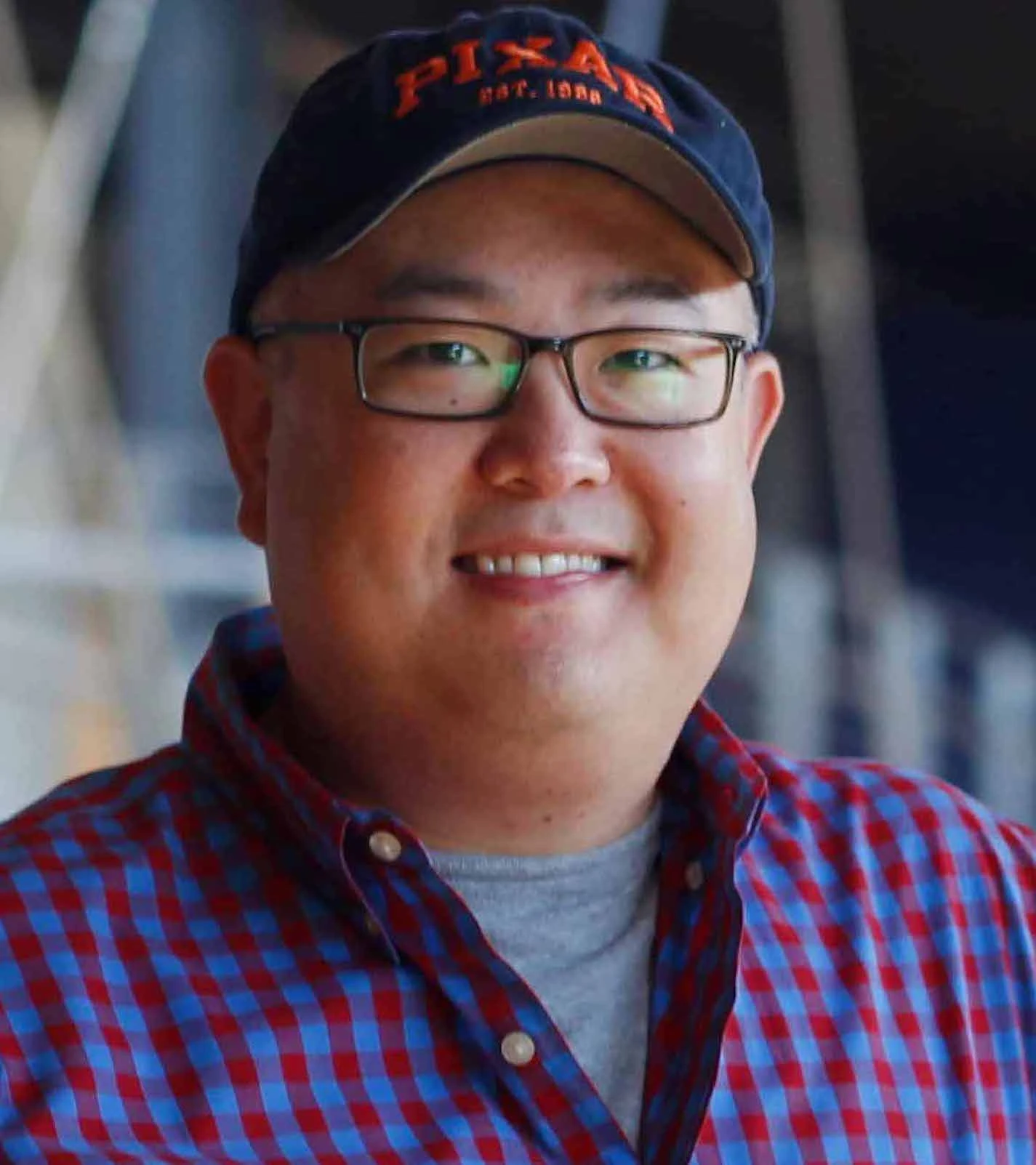
- Sohn in 2023
- Born: October 18, 1977 (age 49); New York City, U.S.
- Education: California Institute of the Arts
- Occupations: Filmmaker; animator; storyboard artist; voice actor
- Years active: 1995–present
- Employer: Pixar Animation Studios (2000–present)
- Spouse: Anna Chambers
- Children: 2

Peter Sohn (born October 18, 1977) is an American filmmaker, animator, storyboard artist, and voice actor. He is best known for his work at Pixar, including directing the short film Partly Cloudy (2009) and the feature films The Good Dinosaur (2015) and Elemental (2023), the latter of which was nominated for the Academy Award for Best Animated Feature. He also voiced Emile in Ratatouille (2007), Squishy in Monsters University (2013), Ciccio in Luca (2021), and Sox in Lightyear (2022).

== Early life ==
Sohn was born on October 18, 1977, in The Bronx, New York City, the son of Korean immigrants Yung Tahk Sohn and Hea Ja Sohn. He has a younger brother. He was raised in New York.

While studying at California Institute of Arts, he got a summer job working on Brad Bird's animated feature film, The Iron Giant (1999).

== Career ==
After graduating from school, he worked at The Walt Disney Company and Warner Bros. before coming to Pixar in the art and story departments for Finding Nemo (2003). He also worked on The Incredibles (2004), Ratatouille (2007) and WALL-E (2008). Sohn performed the voice of Emile in Ratatouille. He made his directorial debut with the short film Partly Cloudy in 2009 which he also wrote. Partly Cloudy was included in the Animation Show of Shows in 2009. Sohn co-directed the English-language version of Ponyo in 2009 with fellow Pixar employees John Lasseter and Brad Lewis. Russell, from Up (2009), was based on Sohn's appearance. He voiced Russell in the corresponding short, George & A.J. (2009), and Squishy in the feature film Monsters University (2013).

Sohn directed the feature film The Good Dinosaur, which was released in November 2015. He voiced its Styracosaurus character Forrest Woodbush.

Sohn was set to voice the Marvel Comics character Ganke Lee in the 2018 Sony Pictures Animation feature film Spider-Man: Into the Spider-Verse, but his lines were ultimately deleted from the final film. However, he voiced Ganke in the 2023 sequel, Spider-Man: Across the Spider-Verse. Additionally, Sohn provided the voices of Ciccio and Sox in the Pixar films Luca (2021) and Lightyear (2022), respectively.

The second feature film that Sohn directed at Pixar, Elemental, is based on his experience growing up in New York. The film debuted out of competition at the 76th Cannes Film Festival. It was released on June 16, 2023. Though it underperformed on its opening weekend, the film's performance improved in the following weeks and received positive word-of-mouth that led it to become a sleeper hit. The film was nominated for the Academy Award for Best Animated Feature.

In June 2025, it was revealed that Sohn would direct Incredibles 3 for Pixar, having been chosen by franchise creator Brad Bird and Pixar CCO Pete Docter to helm the film due to Bird's commitments to the film Ray Gunn.

== Personal life ==
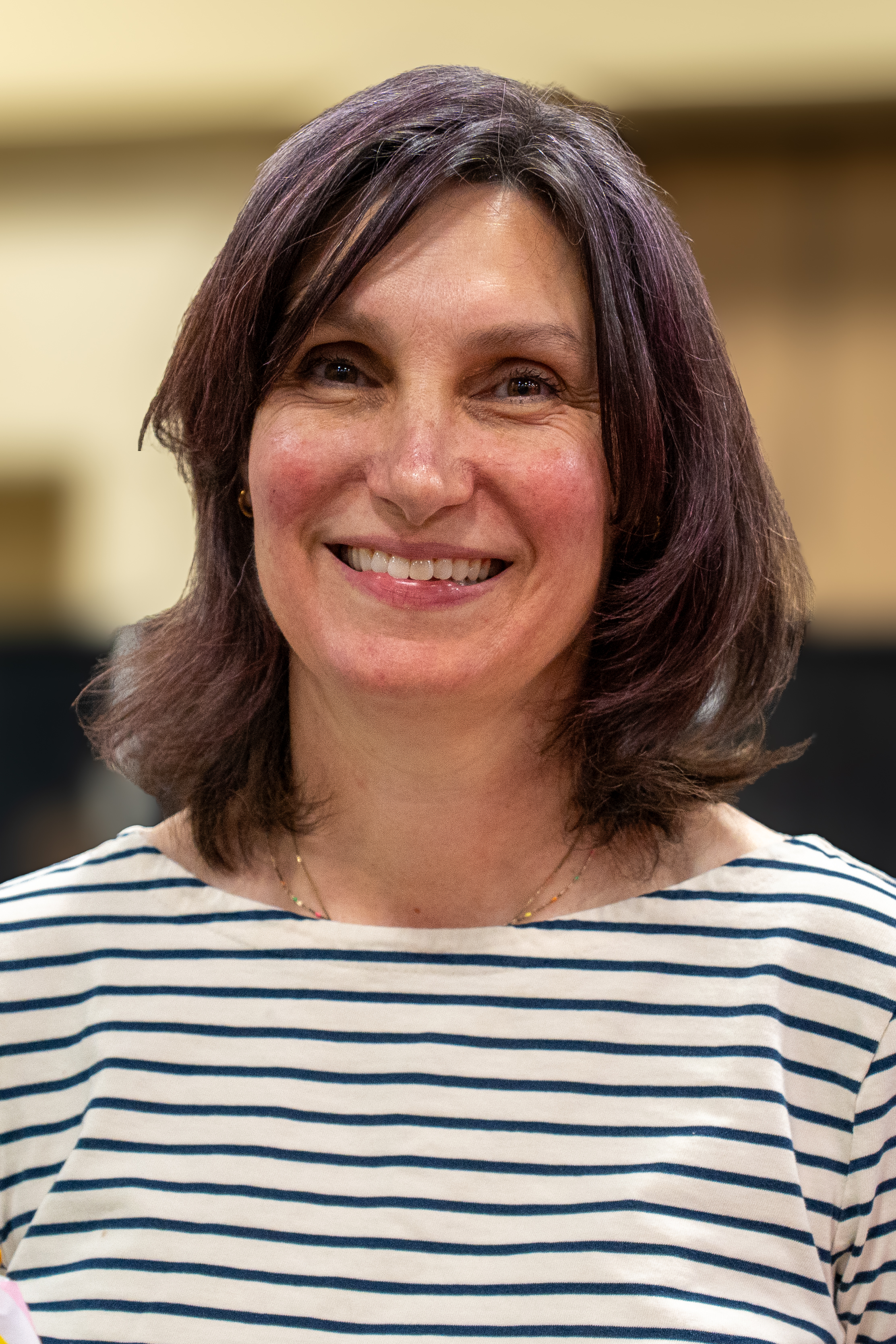
Anna Chambers at Comic Con Oakland 2026

Sohn is married to artist Anna Chambers, whom he met at CalArts. During the production of The Good Dinosaur, they had two children.

== Filmography ==
=== Feature films ===
Year	Title	Director	Story	Executive Producer	Story Artist	Production Artist	Animator	Story Consultant	Other	Voice Role	Notes
1999	The Iron Giant	No	No	No	No	No	Additional	No	Yes		Rough In-between-er
2001	Osmosis Jones	No	No	No	No	No	Yes	No	No		
2003	Finding Nemo	No	No	No	Yes	Yes	No	No	No		
2004	The Incredibles	No	No	No	Yes	Yes	Yes	No	Yes	Mugger	
2007	Ratatouille	No	No	No	Yes	No	Yes	No	Yes	Emile	
2008	WALL-E	No	No	No	Yes	No	No	No	No		
2009	Up	No	No	No	Yes	No	No	No	No		
2009	Ponyo	No	No	No	No	No	No	No	Yes		Director: English Dub, US Version
2010	Toy Story 3	No	No	No	No	Additional	No	No	No		
2012	Brave	No	No	No	Additional	No	No	No	No		
2013	Monsters University	No	No	No	No	No	No	No	Yes	Squishy	
2015	Inside Out	No	No	No	No	No	No	No	Yes		Pixar Senior Creative Team
2015	The Good Dinosaur	Yes	Yes	No	No	No	No	No	Yes	Forrest Woodbush	Pixar Senior Creative Team
2016	Finding Dory	No	No	No	No	No	No	No	Yes		Pixar Senior Creative Team
2017	Cars 3	No	No	No	No	No	No	No	Yes	Additional Voices	Pixar Senior Creative Team
2017	Coco	No	No	No	No	No	No	No	Yes		Pixar Senior Creative Team
2018	Incredibles 2	No	No	No	No	No	No	Yes	Yes		Pixar Senior Creative Team
2019	Toy Story 4	No	No	No	No	No	No	No	Yes		Pixar Senior Creative Team
2020	Onward	No	No	No	No	No	No	No	Yes		Pixar Senior Creative Team
2020	Soul	No	No	No	No	No	No	No	Yes		Pixar Senior Creative Team
2021	Luca	No	No	Yes	No	No	No	No	Yes	Ciccio	Pixar Senior Creative Team
2022	Turning Red	No	No	No	No	No	No	No	Yes		Pixar Senior Creative Team
2022	Lightyear	No	No	No	No	No	No	No	Yes	Sox	Pixar Senior Creative Team
2023	Spider-Man: Across the Spider-Verse	No	No	No	No	No	No	No	Yes	Ganke Lee	
2023	Elemental	Yes	Yes	No	No	No	No	No	Yes		Pixar Senior Creative Team
2024	Inside Out 2	No	No	No	No	No	No	No	Yes		Pixar Senior Creative Team
2025	Elio	No	No	No	No	No	No	No	Yes		Pixar Senior Creative Team
2026	Hoppers	No	No	Yes	No	No	No	No	Yes		Pixar Senior Creative Team
2026	Toy Story 5	No	No	No	No	No	No	No	Yes		Pixar Senior Creative Team
2027	Gatto †	No	No	No	No	No	No	No	Yes		Pixar Senior Creative Team
2028	Incredibles 3 †	Yes	TBA	No	No	No	No	No	Yes		Pixar Senior Creative Team

=== Short films and TV specials ===
Year	Title	Director	Writer	Production Artist	Cinematographer	Animator	Other	Voice Role	Notes
2005	One Man Band	No	No	Yes	No	No	No		
2007	Violet	No	No	No	Yes	No	No		
2007	Your Friend the Rat	No	No	No	No	No	Yes	Emile	Song Performer: "Plan B"
2008	Cars Toons: Mater's Tall Tales	No	No	No	No	No	Yes	Additional Voices	Episodes 1-4
2009	Trifles	No	No	No	Yes	No	No		
2009	Leonardo	No	No	No	No	Yes	No		
2009	Partly Cloudy	Yes	Yes	No	No	No	No		
2009	George & A.J.	No	No	No	No	No	Yes	Russell	
2011	Toy Story Toons: Small Fry	No	No	No	No	No	Yes	Recycle Ben	Special Thanks
2013	Toy Story of Terror!	No	No	No	No	No	Yes	Transitron	TV special
2013	Party Central	No	No	No	No	No	Yes	Squishy	

=== Video games ===
Year	Title	Voice Role
2007	Ratatouille	Emile
2012	Kinect Rush: A Disney-Pixar Adventure	Emile
2013	Disney Infinity	Squishy

=== Other credits ===
Year	Title	Role
2009	Tracy	Blog Creator
2015	Borrowed Time	Thanks
2018	Bao	Special Thanks
2019	Purl	Special Thanks
2019	Smash and Grab	Brian Larsen's Story Brain Trust
2019	Kitbull	Rosana Sullivan's Story Trust
2019	Wind	Story Trust
2020	Out	Story Trust
2022	Cars on the Road	Special Thanks, Pixar Senior Creative Team
2023	Good Chemistry: The Story of 'Elemental'	Himself, Special Thanks
2024	Dream Productions	Pixar Senior Creative Team
2025	Win or Lose	Pixar Senior Creative Team
