= Loop (2020 film) =

2020 short film by Erica Milsom

- Official release poster
- Directed by: Erica Milsom
- Screenplay by: Erica Milsom
- Story by: Adam Burke; Matthias De Clercq; Erica Milsom
- Produced by: Michael Warch; Krissy Cababa
- Starring: Madison Bandy; Christiano Delgado; Louis Gonzales; Asher Brodkey
- Cinematography: Danielle Feinberg; Sylvia Gray Wong
- Edited by: Jason Brodkey
- Music by: Mark Orton
- Production company: Pixar Animation Studios
- Distributed by: Walt Disney Studios; Motion Pictures
- Release dates: January 10, 2020 (Disney+); April 7, 2025 (YouTube)
- Running time: 9 minutes
- Country: United States
- Language: English

Loop is a 2020 American animated drama short film directed and written by Erica Milsom with the story being written by Adam Burke, Matthias De Clercq and Milsom, produced by Pixar Animation Studios, and distributed by Walt Disney Studios Motion Pictures. It is the sixth short film in Pixar's SparkShorts program and focuses on a non-verbal autistic girl and a chatty boy, learning to understand each other. The short was released on Disney+ on January 10, 2020.

== Plot ==
Renee, a non-verbal autistic girl, sits in a canoe and plays with a sound app on her phone. Marcus arrives late, and the camp counselor partners him with Renee, much to his annoyance. When Marcus attempts to show off his paddling skills, Renee is unimpressed and starts rocking the boat. Marcus asks her what she wants, and she has him paddle to land so she can touch the reeds.

When Renee goes back to her phone, Marcus has an idea. He paddles them to a tunnel and has Renee play her phone so that the sound can reverberate. Renee enjoys at first, but then a speedboat races by and the noise overwhelms her. She frantically paddles out of the tunnel and they crash onto the waterside. Renee has a breakdown, throwing her phone into the lake and hiding under the canoe, while Marcus watches in bewilderment.

Later, Marcus pulls up a reed and places it next to the canoe where Renee can see it. He sits nearby until Renee calms down. She sits up, takes the reed, and begins to giggle. The two repeat the sound that the phone made together. The two of them get back into the canoe and paddle back to the camp.

When Renee's recovered phone begins working again, it receives a message from Marcus asking if she wants to go canoeing again.

== Cast ==
- Madison Bandy as Renee
- Christiano (Chachi) Delgado as Marcus
- Louis Gonzales as Camp Counselor

=== Additional voice cast ===
- Asher Brodkey
- Erica Milsom

== Production ==
Loop was directed and written by Erica Milsom, with a story created by Adam Burke, Erica Milsom and Matthias De Clercq. Michael Warch and Krissy Cababa produced the short.

The team brought in consultants from the Autistic Self Advocacy Network to ensure that Renee's portrayal would be authentic.

Loop features Madison Bandy in the role of Renee, who herself is non-speaking and autistic. The audio recording for her voice performance was done by Vince Caro, on location in her home, as part of an effort to make the recording process as comfortable as possible.

The director and animators on Loop spoke with the consultants to gain a sense of the way that a non-speaking person might communicate their feelings differently. They then developed a gestural language for Renee, equating specific behaviors, like holding her ears, or poking her cell phone, with specific emotional states.

The film was Adam Burke's last animation work, as he died from complications relating to his lung cancer positive diagnosis on October 9, 2018.

== Music ==
Mark Orton composed the music for Loop. The score was released on February 28, 2020.

Loop (Original Motion Picture Soundtrack)

Film score by Mark Orton
- Released: February 28, 2020
- Genre: Film score
- Label: Hollywood

=== Track listing ===
All music is composed by Mark Orton.

No.	Title	Length
1.	"You Gotta Help Me Out"	0:37
2.	"Renee's Place"	1:26
3.	"Tunnel Magic"	0:46
4.	"Overload"	0:50
5.	"Processing Time"	0:47
6.	"Marcus' Patience"	1:26
7.	"Loop Theme"	1:38
8.	"Surface (Bonus Track)"	0:38
9.	"Echoer (Bonus Track)"	0:48
10.	"Slow Time (Bonus Track)"	0:39
11.	"Loop Redux (Bonus Track)"	1:25
Total length:		11:00

== Release ==
Loop was released on Disney+ on January 10, 2020.

== Reception ==
Loop received positive reviews. Reviewers commented on its decision to portray the world through Renee's eyes. Jonathon Briggs wrote "By training our eyes to imagine what the world might look like from someone else's perspective, Loop encourages us to practice empathy in what feels like an increasingly divisive and judgmental world."

Some members of the autistic community responded enthusiastically to Loop, expressing excitement on social media prior to the film's release, and praising the portrayal of Renee for being positive and authentic.

Loop won the SIGGRAPH 2020 Computer Animation Festival Electronic Theater Best in Show-winning award in 2021.

It was also nominated that year for an NAACP Image Award.
