= Kitbull =

2019 animated short film by Rosana Sullivan

- Official release poster
- Directed by: Rosana Sullivan
- Written by: Rosana Sullivan
- Produced by: Kathryn Hendrickson
- Cinematography: Arjun Rihan (camera)
- Edited by: Katie Schaefer Bishop
- Music by: Andrew Jimenez
- Production company: Pixar Animation Studios
- Distributed by: Walt Disney Studios; Motion Pictures
- Release dates: January 18, 2019 (El Capitan Theatre); February 18, 2019 (YouTube); February 9, 2024 (with Turning Red)
- Running time: 9 minutes
- Country: United States
- Language: English

Kitbull is a 2019 American animated buddy-drama short film and viral video written and directed by Rosana Sullivan, produced by Pixar Animation Studios, and distributed by Walt Disney Studios Motion Pictures. It is the third film in Pixar's SparkShorts program, and focuses on a fiercely independent stray kitten and an abused pit bull, who form an unlikely friendship. The short premiered at El Capitan Theatre on January 18, 2019, before being released on YouTube on February 18, 2019, and has received over 100 million views as of August 2023. The short was also released on Disney+ on November 12, 2019 and was later released in theaters on February 9, 2024 ahead of Turning Red.

Sullivan said that the creation of the short had originated from her enjoyment of viewing cat videos, and Hendrickson stated that the traditional animation had proved to be challenging in the beginning. Critical reception of the short has been generally positive, with critics praising its story, emotional tone, themes, characterization, and animation. The short was nominated for the Academy Award for Best Animated Short Film at the 92nd Academy Awards.

== Plot ==
A kitten lives in the garbage cans behind a building in San Francisco's Mission District. While foraging for food on the streets, the kitten is offered food by a passerby but runs away. He sleeps in a cardboard box in a dilapidated building's garbage heap, nuzzling a stuffed animal. Later, a fighting pit bull is moved to a doghouse behind the building, and chained to a cinder block. Though the kitten is initially very scared of the dog, the two somewhat bond while playing with a bottlecap.

One night, after the pit bull is taken inside the building, he ends up getting heavily injured in a fight and is thrown back outside. The pit bull then goes to help the kitten, who is trapped in plastic pack rings after being scared by a storm, but the frightened kitten scratches the dog upon seeing his fangs. Saddened, the pit bull retreats to his doghouse, where he is later joined by the kitten, who comforts him. The next day, the two escape the backyard just before the yard's owner can find them. Some time later, the kitten and the pit bull are playing out on the street when the kitten is found by the passerby from before. The woman is startled when the pit bull appears, but after the kitten shows its affection for the dog, she and her husband adopt both of them. After some time, the two animals play happily on top of a hill and join their new family to see a view of the city.

== Production ==
Kitbull is the third short of Pixar's SparkShorts program, which consists in Pixar giving employees six months and limited budgets to produce animated short films. The short was directed and written by Rosana Sullivan. Sullivan described the SparkShorts program as "a huge game-changer" since the studio had started "investing in the unconventional, unknown and diverse voices". Kitbull was produced by Kathryn Hendrickson, and distributed by Walt Disney Studios Motion Pictures. Domee Shi, director of the Academy Award-winning short film Bao, Peter Sohn, director of the feature film The Good Dinosaur, and Kristen Lester, director of the short film Purl, were part of Sullivan's story trust on Kitbull. The short was edited by Katie Schaefer Bishop.

Sullivan said that a cat video had initiated the idea behind the short, mentioning that she enjoyed looking at cat videos whenever she felt stressed. According to Sullivan, she "started sketching this little black kitten in 2013" while "working on a feature film project at the time at Pixar". One of her colleagues showed her "a video of a cat arching its back and trying to act tough, then promptly falling off a counter"; Sullivan was "so entertained" by the difference between the cat's "self-perception" and the reality, which prompted her desire to "draw a tiny kitten who embodied" this contrast. She stated that she had "just wanted to draw a little kitten doing something silly and very, very cat-like". She had initially wished to depict something that appealed to her and was enjoyable, but "it evolved into something more personal" to her in the end. Sullivan "started to crave something more", with the story eventually turning into one about "a lonely cat" and a dog forming a connection. Sullivan said she had "always had a deep love for animals", which made her wish "to tell a story through the lens of animal welfare".

Sullivan first encountered pit bulls while "working in shelters during college" and felt they were "sweet, awesome dogs"; at the same time, she started learning that "there was a negative reputation around them". Sullivan commented that all frames are hand-drawn and hand-painted, adding that while the creators had used computers when drawing, "everything was directly from the artists' hands onto the screen". Sullivan said that she "had always wanted to do a 2D animated short" since she had grown up "watching hand-drawn animation". She stated that she had always enjoyed "the charm of a hand-drawn image", mentioning that every artist has their own way of drawing. Sullivan commented that "the kitten could not have been done without the hand-drawn quality" since "the kitten's character itself is unpredictable and spastic". According to her, "the kitten's frenetic energy could best be captured through hand-drawn animation, especially within [the creators'] limited resources and six-month production timeline".

Sullivan stated that the creators of the short had invented their own "pipeline". Arjun Rihan, who had been the director of photography while working on the short, presented all the shots. When it came to the backgrounds, Sullivan "worked closely" with production designer Tim Evatt and Bill Cone. The creators selected "a mix between impressionistic, kind of loose, fast painting, but also still kind of grungy and gritty"; they wished to prevent the short from being "so heavy" by keeping a sense of "levity" and to make "the background loose enough to maintain focus on the characters". The creators "walked around the Mission with a selfie stick, held low to the ground", in order to see the neighborhood from the kitten's point of view. Sullivan said that she had walked "around Valencia Street, looking for abandoned lots, taking pictures of little cardboard boxes in the weeds to imagine if a kitten would actually live in there". The kitten chooses to be alone and manages to remain unnoticed with the help of background elements such as shadows and road signs. According to Sullivan, "Bernal Hill was always the goal" and represented the "conclusion" of the relationship between the kitten and the pit bull, with this being the place "where they rise above the fray". Sullivan said that the short had been inspired "in a way" by her relationship with her husband and her other "close relationships", stating that she would always climb alongside her husband on the Bernal Hill.

The characters are not excessively detailed. Animation supervisor Guillaume Chartier and character designer Zaruhi Galastian's "love of 2D helped craft the final look and design of the characters". Sullivan described the kitten as "very cartoony" and "almost abstract in some ways". She said just drawing the kitten had been really satisfying and entertaining to her, mentioning that the animators who had become part of the crew shared her point of view. The most gratifying facet of this process for her was collaborating with others to create something better than what she could have achieved alone. She enjoyed working with trustful people that could amaze her. According to Sullivan, "the themes of isolation, empathy and vulnerability always resonated with [her] growing up as a shy kid". She said that since she had been very timid and had difficulty in forming friendships during her childhood, she identified with the kitten, who, instead of creating a connection, preferred to remain in his comfort zone where he was not vulnerable; the story centers on this idea. She commented that the kitten had "always been [her] access point to the story". Sullivan wished to "give a voice to the voiceless" through Kitbull, and she hoped that the relationship between the kitten and the pit bull "can inspire empathy and compassion" regardless of "how scary it may be to step outside of our comfort zone to be vulnerable and connect".

According to Hendrickson, she and Sullivan "partnered and began collaborating on the idea for Kitbull outside of work hours"; this had happened "a few years before the SparkShorts program was created". They "were planning on making the short on [their] own, but when the SparkShorts program was born and [Sullivan] was given the opportunity to direct, Kitbull found its home at the studio". Hendrickson said that she and Sullivan "are both big animal lovers", and she stated that viewing videos with kittens "just became a real outlet for [Sullivan]". Hendrickson commented that depicting the actual behavior of cats and dogs had been "one of [the creators'] main goals in animation" because of their love for them. She said that Sullivan had "built a YouTube playlist with hundreds of cat and dog videos" during the "pre-production" phase that had been "used as reference" since "so much charm and appeal can be found in an animal's nuanced movements". Hendrickson stated that Guillaume Chartier had done "an incredible job of guiding the animation team through that journey". She hoped that besides being "moved" by the friendship between the kitten and the pit bull, viewers would also be "reminded that friendships come in all shapes and sizes and can be found in the most unexpected places"; she added that, "as the kitten experienced, vulnerability and trust are the foundation of the deepest friendships".

Kitbull is dissimilar to the usual technique of Pixar because it is animated in 2D style. Hendrickson said that since the short was hand-drawn, there were many challenges at the beginning, including "trying to figure out how to tell the story with the resources within the studio, and then taking this 2D project and getting it to fit back into the normal 3D process at Pixar". During the layout phase of the project, the creators had positioned the camera and decided on "the staging and the framing for all of the shots". Hendrickson said that when Rihan had finished laying out the shots, they "would take those shots and render them all out", after which "those renders became the templates for [their] background painters". The animators drew the characters on "a layer" and "the backgrounds were all painted on a layer"; the compositor then had "to stitch those two together". Hendrickson said that the action of Kitbull takes place in the Mission District, San Francisco, which is a very important location for Sullivan, who had lived there after moving to San Francisco. According to Hendrickson, the "sound designer even layered in some ambient noises" from the Bay Area Rapid Transit in the short's background. Hendrickson enjoyed seeing how every crew member had an influence on the short.

== Music ==
Andrew Jimenez, who co-directed the Pixar short film One Man Band with Mark Andrews, composed the music for Kitbull. The score was released on April 5, 2019.

Kitbull (Original Motion Picture Soundtrack)

Film score by Andrew Jimenez
- Released: April 5, 2019
- Genre: Film score
- Label: Hollywood

=== Track listing ===
All music is composed by Andrew Jimenez.

No.	Title	Length
1.	"Mission Opening"	0:55
2.	"Meet Pit"	0:22
3.	"Kitten Play (Alternate Version)"	0:42
4.	"Kitten Play"	1:05
5.	"The Doorway"	0:18
6.	"Save Me"	0:46
7.	"Sad Dog"	0:21
8.	"Trust"	1:04
9.	"Escape (Alternate Version 1)"	0:41
10.	"Escape (Alternate Version 2)"	0:35
11.	"Escape"	0:44
12.	"Mission Overlook"	1:06
13.	"End Credits"	1:04
14.	"Kitbull Music Box"	0:47
15.	"The Evil Dog Master"	0:53
16.	"Kind"	1:25
Total length:		12:48

== Release ==
Kitbull was first shown along with the shorts Purl and Smash and Grab on January 18, 2019, during a limited release at the El Capitan Theatre that lasted for a week; following this, the short premiered live on Pixar's YouTube channel on February 18, 2019. The short was also released on Disney+ on November 12, 2019, alongside fellow "SparkShorts" entries Purl, Smash and Grab, and Float. Kitbull debuted in theaters in front of Turning Red on February 9, 2024.

== Reception ==
=== Critical response ===
Kitbull has received a largely positive critical response, being regarded as "adorable", "beautiful", moving, "sweet", "amazing", "emotionally tantalizing", as well as "a timeless tale of unlikely animal friendships". Dan Sarto of Animation World Network described the short as "charming, compelling and thoroughly enjoyable", and he stated that it "delivers us everything we could ask for". IndieWire's Zack Sharf said that the short is "going to break your heart in typical Pixar fashion". Chris Pastrick of the Pittsburgh Tribune-Review wrote that Kitbull presents a "heartwarming", "tear-jerking storyline". Mashable's Shannon Connellan stated that the short would make viewers become "a puddle of tears". Benjamin Bullard of Syfy Wire commented that Kitbull would "trash your animal-loving heart before the inevitable happy ending comes to the rescue"; he described the short as a "wordless gem that unfolds a details-loaded vignette through one heart-wrenching emotional roller coaster of a ride". Bridget Sharkey of Arizona Daily Star said that despite being "less than nine minutes long", Kitbull "packs a seriously powerful emotional punch in that period of time"; she stated that the short contains a "sweetly satisfying story" that would "make even the toughest and steeliest watcher eventually tear up", adding that it conveys "a powerful message" and is "an incredible piece of film". PopSugar's Kate Schweitzer mentioned that Pixar had "truly outdone itself by achieving full-scale weeps in a matter of mere minutes" through Kitbull, and she characterized the short as "simple and sweet". Nicole Clark of San Francisco Chronicle said that Kitbull uses "unlikely animal companionship to tell a larger story about compassion, friendship and redemption". She stated that the short "ends with a beautiful, sweeping vista of San Francisco, from the top of Bernal Hill", adding that "the location perfectly captures the full emotional swell of the short", "the warmth of a new friendship" and "the hope of a new beginning".

The short's use of traditional animation has been praised by critics. Chris Pastrick said that the short "is special in that [it is] the first entirely hand-drawn feature from the studio known for its cutting-edge digital animation". James White of Empire described Kitbull as "a sweet and beautifully animated piece" that uses "hand-drawn 2D techniques blended with all the computing power that Pixar can muster"; he felt that the short "explores a style unlike anything the company [had] produced". Bridget Sharkey wrote that Kitbull is "exquisitely created via hand-drawing" and consists of "simple, life-like animation that is also compulsively watchable". Jennifer Wolfe of Animation World Network commented that the short is "packed with hand-drawn goodness", and Benjamin Bullard stated that it is "rendered in a super-rich 2D cel-shaded style". Shannon Connellan said that Kitbull being a "2D animated short" is not "the usual realm for Pixar". Paste's Garrett Martin mentioned that seeing the short is "exciting", especially since it was created by "a studio that [is not] known for this style of animation". Dan Sarto felt that the short is "beautifully designed", and he said it is "hard to imagine this story being any more engaging or enjoyable had the filmmakers chosen to use any other animation technique". Sarto stated that "in an entertainment world dominated more and more by 3D, Kitbull exemplifies how 2D animation, in the right hands, telling the right story, remains something truly special", being "unequalled".

Kitbull's focus on the treatment of animals and the awareness of pit bulls' reputation raised by the short have been commented on. Kate Schweitzer felt that Kitbull "makes a powerful statement about the treatment of animals" with the help of "a few startling scenes"; she said that "regardless of whether you consider yourself a dog person or a cat person", Kitbull would "reaffirm your love of all animals and make you hug your own pets a bit tighter tonight". Benjamin Bullard wrote that Kitbull depicts "both the terrible and the magical sides of the ways people interact with animals", and Diana Letizia of Il Secolo XIX also felt that the short presents how humans affect animals both in positive and negative ways. Shannon Connellan commented that while animation rarely "tackles the devastating subject of animal abuse", Kitbull "does with heartbreaking insight". WSET's Elizabeth Tyree said that Kitbull would "have you weeping within minutes of its start", adding that the short "could spark more conversation about the reputation of pit bulls". Kate Schweitzer also felt that the short "might even open up more meaningful conversations about the reputation of pit bulls being an aggressive and dangerous breed", and Katelynn Sprague of 96.5 KPEL commented that Kitbull "sheds some light on this particular issue".

The characters' depiction in the short has been praised. Michael Walsh of Nerdist stated that Kitbull presents "a story with fleshed-out characters" that go through "a meaningful arc, one that has us feeling all sorts of emotions". He characterized the kitten as "feisty" and "tough", and the dog as "happy" and "sweet". The Verge's Jacob Kastrenakes commented that the kitten is "the best animated cat [he had] ever seen". Benjamin Bullard said that the short provides "an anthropomorphized fantasy of how animals' secret lives can follow poignant beats we might never glimpse". Nicole Clark felt that the kitten was "lovable" and "skittish", and she described the pit bull as "happy-go-lucky". Esther Zuckerman of Thrillist said that the kitten and the pit bull "are perfectly calibrated to appeal to our cuteness sensors", with the kitten having "eyes that fill its entire face" and the pit bull having "a soft snout". Zuckerman characterized the two of them as "adorable". Garrett Martin felt that Kitbull "is a powerful look at an unlikely friendship between a stray kitten and an abused pit bull that has the lifelike quality and emotional heft of the best Pixar and Disney animation". He also described the short as "gorgeous, capturing not just how animals move but also how they think and relate to one another", and added that Kitbull is "as good" as Lady and the Tramp (1955) and One Hundred and One Dalmatians (1961) when it comes to "examining the lives and personalities of animals in lifelike detail".

=== Accolades ===
List of awards and nominations
Award	Date of ceremony	Category	Recipients	Result	Refs.
Academy Awards	February 9, 2020	Best Animated Short Film	Rosana Sullivan and Kathryn Hendrickson	Nominated	
Humanitas Prize	January 24, 2020	Humanitas Prize for Short Film	Rosana Sullivan	Won	
