= Madeline Sharafian =

American filmmaker (born 1993)

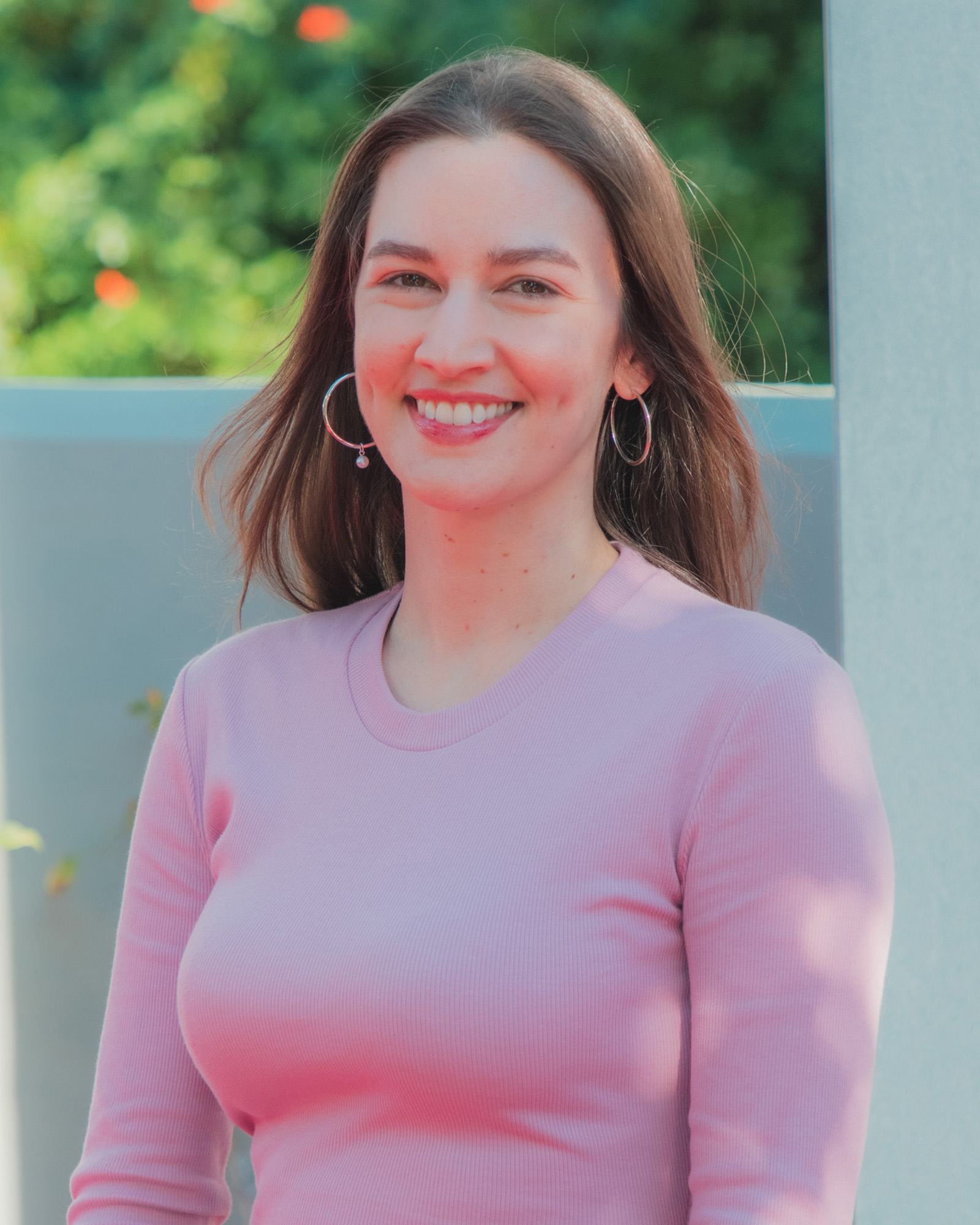
- Sharafian in 2026
- Born: February 1, 1993 (age 33); Alameda, California, US
- Education: California Institute of the Arts (BFA)
- Occupations: Film director; Screenwriter; Storyboard artist; Animator
- Years active: 2013−present
- Employers: Cartoon Network (2014–2017); Pixar Animation Studios (2017–present)

Madeline Sharafian (born February 1, 1993) is an Armenian-American film director, screenwriter, storyboard artist, and animator. She is best known for her work at Pixar, including directing the short film Burrow (2020) and the feature film Elio (2025), both of which were nominated for the Academy Awards.

== Early life ==
Sharafian was born in Alameda, California, and is of Armenian descent. By 2013, she was enrolled in CalArts.

== Career ==
In 2013, Sharafian wrote and directed the short film Omelette. In 2014, she served as a storyboard artist, writer, and character designer on the Cartoon Network series We Bare Bears. In 2017, she storyboarded sequences for Coco and Dante's Lunch. In 2020, she was a story lead on the Academy-Award nominated Onward, then later wrote and directed a 2D animated Pixar short film titled Burrow, originally slated to play in theaters before the feature film Soul. In October 2020, it was announced that due to the COVID-19 pandemic, the short would instead premiere on Disney+. In 2022, she served as a storyboard artist for Turning Red. In 2024, she served as an associate executive producer on the Disney+ series Dream Productions. In June 2025, she made her feature directorial debut with Elio, alongside Domee Shi and Adrian Molina. After finishing Elio, Sharafian was confirmed to be developing another original Pixar feature film.

== Filmography ==
=== Feature films ===
Year	Title	Director	Story Writer	Story Supervisor	Story Artist	Additional Voices	Pixar Senior Creative Team
2017	Coco	No	No	No	Yes	No	No
2020	Onward	No	No	No	Yes	No	No
2022	Turning Red	No	No	No	Yes	No	No
2025	Elio	Yes	Yes	No	No	Yes	Yes
2026	Hoppers	No	No	Yes	No	Yes	Yes
2026	Toy Story 5	No	No	No	No	No	Yes

=== Short films ===
Year	Title	Director	Writer	Animator	Other	Notes [refs]
2013	Omelette	Yes	Yes	No	Yes	Producer
2014	Acorn	Yes	Yes	Yes	No	
2017	Weekends	No	No	Yes	Yes	Cel painter
2017	Dante's Lunch	No	No	No	Yes	Story artist
2018	Purl	No	No	No	Yes	Story trust
2020	Burrow	Yes	Yes	Yes	No	
2021	Twenty Something	No	No	No	Yes	Story trust
2021	Nona	No	No	No	Yes	Special thanks

=== Television ===
Year	Title	Director	Writer	Story artist	Other	Notes [refs]
2014–17	We Bare Bears	No	20 episodes	17 episodes	Yes	Character designer
2016	Goodnight Ice Bear	Yes	Yes	No	Yes	Editor
2024	Dream Productions	No	No	No	Yes	Associate executive producer

== Accolades ==
Accolades received by Madeline Sharafian
Award	Date	Category	Nominated work	Result	Refs
Academy Awards	April 25, 2021	Best Animated Short	Burrow	Nominated	
Academy Awards	March 15, 2026	Best Animated Feature	Elio	Nominated	
Annie Awards	February 6, 2016	Outstanding Achievement for Storyboarding in an Animated Television/Broadcast Production	We Bare Bears	Nominated	
Annie Awards	February 3, 2018	Outstanding Achievement for Storyboarding in a Feature Production	Coco	Nominated	
Hollywood Critics Association	March 5, 2021	Best Short Film	Burrow	Nominated	
