= Dan Scanlon =

American filmmaker (born 1976)

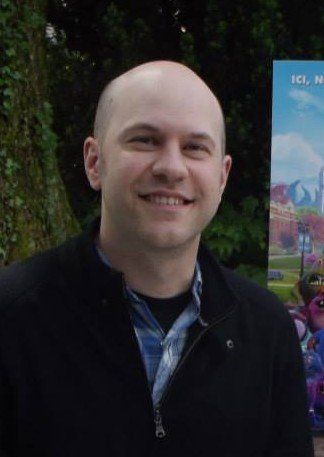
- Scanlon at the 2013 Annecy International Animated Film Festival
- Born: June 21, 1976 (age 50); Clawson, Michigan, U.S.
- Education: Columbus College of Art and Design
- Occupations: Film director; screenwriter; storyboard artist; animator
- Years active: 1998–present
- Employer: Pixar Animation Studios (2001–2024)
- Spouse: Michele Scanlon

Daniel Scanlon (born June 21, 1976) is an American filmmaker, storyboard artist, and animator. He is best known for directing the Pixar animated films Monsters University (2013) and Onward (2020), with the latter nominating him for the Academy Award for Best Animated Feature.

== Early life ==
Scanlon grew up in Clawson, Michigan. When he was one year old and his brother three years old, their father died, and when they were teenagers, a relative gave them a brief audio recording of their father. Scanlon has said that these experiences helped inspire the story of Onward. He graduated with a BFA from the Columbus College of Art and Design in 1998.

== Career ==
Scanlon was an animator for The Indescribable Nth and Joseph: King of Dreams. He served as a storyboard artist for The Little Mermaid II: Return to the Sea and 101 Dalmatians II: Patch's London Adventure.

Scanlon joined Pixar in 2001, where he was a story artist for Cars and Toy Story 3. He co-directed the short film Mater and the Ghostlight. He illustrated part one of Unmentionables, a comic book written by his wife, Michele Scanlon, and wrote and directed the live-action feature film Tracy. Tracy was Scanlon's first feature film as a writer/director. He also served as a member of the senior creative team on Brave and Inside Out.

Scanlon directed the prequel film of Monsters, Inc., Monsters University, released in 2013, to positive reviews and commercial success. He subsequently directed the fantasy-road trip film Onward (2020), featuring the voices of Tom Holland, Chris Pratt, Julia Louis-Dreyfus and Octavia Spencer. It was nominated for an Academy Award for Best Animated Feature, but lost to another Pixar film Soul.

In February 2021, Scanlon stated that he and Kori Rae would develop another original Pixar feature film. In November 2024, Scanlon stated he was leaving Pixar, but would not be against working with the company in a consultancy role in the future.

== Filmography ==
=== Feature films ===
Year	Title	Director	Writer	Executive Producer	Story Artist	Animator: Character Builder	Additional Voices	Other	Notes
2000	The Little Mermaid II: Return to the Sea	No	No	No	Yes	No	No	No	Direct-to-video
2000	Joseph: King of Dreams	No	No	No	No	Yes	No	No	Direct-to-video
2003	101 Dalmatians II: Patch's London Adventure	No	No	No	Yes	No	No	No	Direct-to-video
2006	Cars	No	No	No	Yes	No	Yes	Yes	Additional Screenplay Material
2007	Ratatouille	No	No	No	No	No	No	Yes	Pixar Productions
2010	Toy Story 3	No	No	No	Yes	No	No	No	
2011	Cars 2	No	No	No	No	No	No	Yes	Pixar Senior Creative Team
2012	Brave	No	No	No	No	No	No	Yes	Pixar Senior Creative Team
2013	Monsters University	Yes	Yes	No	No	No	Yes	Yes	Pixar Senior Creative Team
2015	Inside Out	No	No	No	No	No	No	Yes	Pixar Senior Creative Team
2015	The Good Dinosaur	No	No	No	No	No	No	Yes	Pixar Senior Creative Team
2016	Finding Dory	No	No	No	No	No	No	Yes	Pixar Senior Creative Team
2017	Cars 3	No	No	No	No	No	No	Yes	Pixar Senior Creative Team
2017	Coco	No	No	No	No	No	No	Yes	Pixar Senior Creative Team
2018	Incredibles 2	No	No	No	No	No	No	Yes	Pixar Senior Creative Team
2019	Toy Story 4	No	No	No	No	No	No	Yes	Pixar Senior Creative Team
2020	Onward	Yes	Yes	No	No	No	Yes	Yes	Pixar Senior Creative Team
2020	Soul	No	No	Yes	No	No	No	Yes	Pixar Senior Creative Team
2021	Luca	No	No	No	No	No	No	Yes	Pixar Senior Creative Team
2022	Turning Red	No	No	Yes	No	No	No	Yes	Pixar Senior Creative Team
2022	Lightyear	No	No	No	No	No	No	Yes	Pixar Senior Creative Team
2023	Elemental	No	No	No	No	No	No	Yes	Pixar Senior Creative Team
2024	Inside Out 2	No	No	Yes	No	No	No	Yes	Pixar Senior Creative Team
2025	Elio	No	No	No	No	No	No	Yes	Special Thanks
2025	Zootopia 2	No	No	No	No	No	No	Yes	Special Thanks

==== Independent Films ====
Year	Title	Director	Writer	Producer	Film Editor	Cinematographer	Puppeteer	Sound Mixer	Animator	Other	Role	Notes
2009	Tracy	Yes	Yes	Yes	Yes	Yes	Yes	Yes	Yes	Yes	Dan Sullivan	Extras, Artwork, Song Lyricist

==== Short films and series ====
Year	Title	Director	Writer	Animator	Executive Producer	Other	Notes
2000	The Indescribable Nth	No	No	Yes	No	No	
2006	Mater and the Ghostlight	Co-Director	Yes	No	No	No	Original Story
2013	Party Central	No	No	No	Yes	No	
2022	Cars on the Road	No	No	No	Yes	Yes	Disney+ Original short films, Pixar Senior Creative Team
2024	Dream Productions	No	No	No	Yes	Yes	Disney+ Original long-form limited series, Pixar Senior Creative Team
2025	Win or Lose	No	No	No	No	Yes	Disney+ Original long-form limited series, Pixar Senior Creative Team

==== Other Credits ====
Year	Title	Notes
2008	Cars Toons: Mater's Tall Tales	Special Thanks
2017	Lou	Special Thanks
2019	Purl	Special Thanks
2019	Float	Special Thanks
2020	Out	Special Thanks
