= Wind (2019 film) =

2019 short film by Edwin Chang

- Official release poster
- Directed by: Edwin Chang
- Screenplay by: Edwin Chang
- Story by: Edwin Chang
- Produced by: Jesús MartÍnez
- Starring: Sonoko Konishi; Emilio Fuentes
- Cinematography: Scott Clifford; Robert Kinkead
- Edited by: Tim Fox
- Music by: Andrew Jimenez
- Production company: Pixar Animation Studios
- Distributed by: Walt Disney Studios; Motion Pictures
- Release date: December 13, 2019 (Disney+)
- Running time: 8 minutes
- Country: United States
- Language: English

Wind is a 2019 American animated short film directed and written by Edwin Chang, produced by Pixar Animation Studios, and distributed by Walt Disney Studios Motion Pictures. The fifth film in Pixar's SparkShorts program, it focuses on a grandmother and grandson longing to escape an endless chasm. The short was released on Disney+ on December 13, 2019.

== Plot ==
Ellis and his Grandmother live in a mysterious sink-hole full of floating rocks and strange debris of disused items and machines. They manage to make a small home for themselves out of the garbage and feast on potatoes, the only food they are able to grow. Every day, Grandma has Ellis attach a cord to himself to float out and collect items that they can use for their benefit. In particular, the two are building a rocket so that they can escape from the hole and into the bright light at the top. One day, Ellis discovers an abandoned plane in the wreckage, but is dismayed when he realizes that it can only fit one person. Grandma suggests that he pilot the plane out of the hole and simply pull her up with the cord, to which he agrees.

With the final touches added to their rocket. Ellis gets in and flies upward; avoiding the rocks and debris that he passes by. Despite some turbulence, Ellis makes it out through the top and lands on the outside where he ends up in a lush field and sees birds flying overhead. He then grabs the cord and pulls it up which takes almost the entire day. To his surprise, it is not Grandma at the end of the cord - but a box of potatoes. He hugs the box in tearful gratitude for her sacrifice.

== Cast ==
- Sonoko Konishi as Grandma
- Emilio Fuentes as Ellis

== Production ==
=== Development ===
At Pixar, Edwin Chang started his career as a simulation technical director. After submitting his idea for Wind, he was selected for the program and took a sabbatical from his long-time job, to craft an animated ode to his family history with help from producer Jesús Martínez and a team of animators (supervised by Stefan Schumacher). In December 2019, Edwin Chang, writer/director of Wind, described the short by saying "The story itself at its core is an immigration story". Chang felt that "There were all these stories in the news about child immigrants, and while my story wasn't directly related to those, there were a lot of parallels that made those so much more meaningful to us.” His grandmother and father fled from North to South Korea during the Korean War. His father then immigrated to the United States and had to leave his grandmother behind. Eventually she rejoined them, but the separation left an impression on Chang. His family history served as the main inspiration for Wind, and the current political climate made the themes even more relevant.

== Music ==
Andrew Jimenez, who composed the music for the Pixar short film Kitbull, composed the music for Wind. The score was released on February 28, 2020.

Wind (Original Motion Picture Soundtrack)

Film score by Andrew Jimenez
- Released: February 28, 2020
- Genre: Film score
- Label: Hollywood

=== Track listing ===
All music is composed by Andrew Jimenez.

No.	Title	Length
1.	"Logos"	0:19
2.	"Wake Up"	1:00
3.	"Gathering"	1:24
4.	"Another Try"	0:34
5.	"No"	0:16
6.	"A New Plan"	0:47
7.	"Build and Launch"	1:34
8.	"Build Intro (Alternate)"	0:25
9.	"Alone"	1:00
10.	"Alone (Alternate)"	0:51
11.	"End Titles"	1:08
12.	"Wind Demo Musical Atmosphere"	1:05
13.	"Wind Demo Themes"	0:15
Total length:		10:38

== Release ==
Wind was released on Disney+ on December 13, 2019.

== Reception ==
Wind has obtained a generally positive critical response, with writers deeming it "tearjerking" and "magical". Alex Reif of The Laughing Place described the short as "while the ending is a little predictable from the start, it's nonetheless a tearjerker." Shireen Honmode of MEAWW felt that the short showed "a metaphor of the life of people who struggle to make ends meet".
