= Mark Andrews (filmmaker) =

American filmmaker (born 1968)

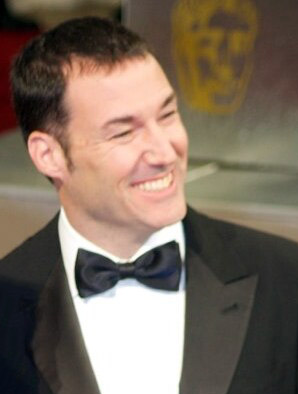
- Andrews at the 66th British Academy Film Awards
- Born: Mark Elliott Andrews; September 12, 1968 (age 58); Los Angeles County, California, U.S.
- Education: CalArts: Bachelor of Fine Arts (1993)
- Occupations: Film director; screenwriter; animator; storyboard artist
- Years active: 1994–present
- Employer: Pixar Animation Studios (2000–2018)
- Spouse: Patricia Gatz
- Children: 4
- Relatives: Bryan Andrews (brother)
- Awards: Academy Award for Best Animated Feature; Brave (2012)

Mark Elliott Andrews (born September 12, 1968) is an American filmmaker, animator, and storyboard artist. He is best known for directing (alongside Brenda Chapman) the 2012 Pixar feature film Brave. He was the story supervisor for The Incredibles and Ratatouille, directed and co-wrote the short film One Man Band, and co-wrote Jack-Jack Attack.

== Career ==
Andrews studied animation at the Character Animation Program at CalArts. After that he was one of five who got a Disney internship, but was fired after three months. Some of his student films have been featured at MOMA's exhibition Tomorrowland: CalArts in Moving Pictures. Unlike most other CalArts alumni, he was not a huge fan of Disney films, and claimed he was a bigger fan of anime such as Kimba the White Lion, Speed Racer, and Robotech.

He is the father of Maeve Andrews, who voiced Jack-Jack Parr in The Incredibles. Andrews replaced Brenda Chapman as director of Brave (2012). Both were credited as directors, and they won the 2013 Academy Award for Best Animated Feature.

On January 13, 2013, it was announced that Andrews was writing and directing another original feature film at Pixar. Having now directed an animated film, Andrews found the storyboarding phase on Brave to be a frustrating and overly time-consuming process since a 2-D context was being used to convey a 3-D film and it left little room for change later on. This contrasted with his experience on John Carter just before where that film was always being made in the context of the live-action medium and changes could be made in real time. Andrews pitched to Pixar Presidents Ed Catmull and Jim Morris his idea to make his next film at Pixar using mo-cap instead of storyboards for sketching ideas. Andrews' intention for using mo-cap was to be in a 3-D context earlier in the process of making a 3-D film, which was approved. Andrews ultimately left Pixar in 2018 with the understanding that the studio no longer wanted to make the film, which he described as a "big action-adventure fantasy epic". The film's working title was Blade.

Since leaving Pixar, Andrews has been a vocal proponent of implementing tools such as Unreal Engine to work in 3-D animation in context with significantly fewer financial and creative constraints while producing significantly more content. Andrews served as director and executive producer of the Netflix original animated series Super Giant Robot Brothers, which was released on August 4, 2022. The series was made using Unreal Engine developed by Epic Games in collaboration with Reel FX Animation.

In October 2021, it was announced that Andrews was attached to write and executive-produce an animated fantasy drama for Fox Entertainment and Bento Box Entertainment titled Hawkmaster. In July 2024, Andrews was also attached as the showrunner of a "post-apocalyptic samurai dinosaur" series for animation and VFX studio Floating Rock titled Kyōryū. By July 2026, Andrews signed on as supervising director and co-showrunner on John Carter, Warlord of Mars, an animated series adaptation of John Carter. He previously wrote the screenplay for the live-action John Carter film.

== Filmography ==
=== Films ===
Year	Title	Director	Screenplay	Story Supervisor	Story Artist	Other	Notes
1998	Quest for Camelot	No	No	No	No	Yes	Story Department
1999	The Iron Giant	No	No	No	Yes	Yes	Workbook Designer
2001	Osmosis Jones	No	No	Yes	No	Yes	Story: Animation Department Heads and Designers
2002	Spider-Man	No	No	No	Yes	No	
2004	The Incredibles	No	No	Yes	No	Yes	Visual Development, Additional Voices
2006	Cars	No	No	No	Additional	No	
2007	Ratatouille	No	No	Yes	No	No	
2009	Up	No	No	No	No	Yes	Additional Voices
2010	Toy Story 3	No	No	No	No	Yes	Additional Story
2011	Cars 2	No	No	No	No	Yes	Pixar Senior Creative Team
2012	John Carter	Second Unit	Yes	No	No	No	
2012	Brave	Yes	Yes	No	No	Yes	Song Lyrics: "Touch the Sky", Pixar Senior Creative Team
2013	Monsters University	No	No	No	No	Yes	Pixar Senior Creative Team
2015	Inside Out	No	No	No	No	Yes	Pixar Senior Creative Team
2015	The Good Dinosaur	No	No	No	No	Yes	Pixar Senior Creative Team
2016	Finding Dory	No	No	No	No	Yes	Pixar Senior Creative Team
2017	Cars 3	No	No	No	No	Yes	Pixar Senior Creative Team
2017	Coco	No	No	No	No	Yes	Pixar Senior Creative Team
2018	Incredibles 2	No	No	No	No	Yes	Story Consultant, Pixar Senior Creative Team

==== Short films ====
Year	Title	Director	Writer	Story Artist	Executive Producer	Other	Notes
1997	Loose Tooth	No	No	No	No	Yes	Animation Story Developer
2005	Jack-Jack Attack	No	Story	No	No	No	
2005	Mr. Incredible and Pals	No	No	Yes	No	No	
2005	One Man Band	Yes	Yes	No	No	No	
2007	Violet	Yes	No	No	No	No	
2009	Alma	No	No	No	No	Yes	Consultant
2012	The Legend of Mor'du	No	No	No	Yes	No	
2014	Love Hurts	No	No	No	No	Yes	Role: Reese
2020	Circle of Stone	Yes	Yes	No	No	No	

=== Television ===
Year	Title	Director	Writer	Executive Producer	Storyboard Artist	Character Models	Song Lyricist	Notes
1996	The Real Adventures of Jonny Quest	No	No	No	Yes	Yes	No	Animation director, storyboard artist on episode: "Escape to Questworld"; Models on episodes: "East of Zanzibar" and "Future Rage"
1998–2000	Histeria!	No	No	No	Yes	No	No	Storyboarded 11 episodes
2001	The Powerpuff Girls	No	Yes	No	Yes	No	No	Episode: "Nano of the North"
2001–04	Samurai Jack	No	Yes	No	Yes	No	No	Wrote 5 episodes, storyboarded 2 episodes
2003–04	Star Wars: Clone Wars	No	No	No	Yes	No	No	Storyboarded 20 episodes
2021	What If...?	No	No	No	Yes	No	No	Storyboarded 9 episodes
2022	Super Giant Robot Brothers	Yes	No	Yes	Comic book	No	Yes	
2022–26	Primal	No	Yes	No	Yes	No	No	Episodes: "The Red Mist", "Feast of Flesh", and "Cavern of Horrors"

=== Music video ===
Year	Title	Director	Storyboard Artist	Notes
2021	"The Writing on the Wall"	Creative	Yes	Music video by Iron Maiden

=== Video games ===
Year	Title	Animator
1994	Cadillacs and Dinosaurs: The Second Cataclysm	Yes

==== Other credits ====
Year	Title	Role
2008	Bolt	Consultant - uncredited
2009	Tracy	Pitchman #1
2009	Wild Dogs	Special Thanks
2011	Toy Story Toons: Small Fry	Special Thanks
2015	Sanjay's Super Team	Special Thanks
2016	The Jungle Book	Thanks
2019	Smash and Grab	Brian Larsen's Story Brain Trust
2019	Float	Story Trust
2021	Nona	Special Thanks
