= A Spark Story =

2021 American documentary film by Pixar

- Official release poster
- Directed by: Jason Sterman; Leanne Dare
- Produced by: Brian McGinn; Jason Sterman; David Gelb
- Starring: Aphton Corbin; Louis Gonzales
- Cinematography: David Bolen
- Edited by: James Long; Tiffany Dixon
- Music by: Jeremy Turner
- Production companies: Pixar Animation Studios; Supper Club
- Distributed by: Disney+
- Release date: September 24, 2021
- Running time: 90 minutes
- Country: United States
- Language: English

A Spark Story is a 2021 American documentary film directed by Jason Sterman and Leanne Dare. Focusing on SparkShorts directors Aphton Corbin and Louis Gonzales, the film is a co-production between Pixar and Supper Club, and marks the former's first fully live-action project. The film was released on September 24, 2021, on Disney+. The film was to be removed from Disney+ on May 26, 2023, but it was kept after demand by fans.

== Synopsis ==
The film centers on SparkShorts directors Aphton Corbin and Louis Gonzales as they work to bring their projects Twenty Something and Nona to the screen.

== Cast ==
- Aphton Corbin as herself
- Louis Gonzales as himself
- Pete Docter as himself

== Development ==
On January 29, 2020, The Walt Disney Company announced that an untitled documentary series focusing on the SparkShorts series was in development for Disney+. The series, which provides "an immersive look at the next generation of Pixar filmmaker[s]", was executive-produced by Brian McGinn, Jason Sterman, and David Gelb. On July 21, 2021, it was reported that the project was being redeveloped as a feature film under the name A Spark Story, with McGinn, Sterman, and Gelb as producers. Sterman also directed the film alongside Leanne Dare. Pixar produced the project alongside Supper Club.

== Release ==
A Spark Story was released on September 24, 2021, as a Disney+ exclusive film.

== Reception ==
Meredith Woerner of Variety stated that the documentary film manages to attract attention on talented Pixar's employees and their stories, allowing the audience to know better about their journey as creators. Tony Betti of The Laughing Place gave the film a positive review, saying "at times, the cinematic nature overpowered the actual content. Dramatic camera pans of the directors thinking while sitting at a table, in a screening room, or even in their own home while cooking breakfast almost take away from the credibility of the subject matter at hand. That said, the same dramatic shots of the Pixar campus are a highlight, especially for fans, who otherwise aren't allowed anywhere near these buildings." Sabrina McFarland of Common Sense Media rated the movie 4 out of 5 stars, praised the positive messages and role models, stating the film promotes perseverance, dedication, and ambition, while complimenting the movie for its depiction of diversity.
