= Self (film) =

2024 short film by Searit Kahsay Huluf

- Official release poster
- Directed by: Searit Kahsay Huluf
- Written by: Searit Kahsay Huluf
- Produced by: Eric Rosales
- Edited by: Will Starling
- Music by: Jennifer Rowekamp
- Production company: Pixar Animation Studios
- Distributed by: Walt Disney Studios; Motion Pictures
- Release date: February 2, 2024
- Running time: 6 minutes
- Country: United States
- Language: English

Self is a 2024 American animated short film written and directed by Searit Kahsay Huluf, produced by Pixar Animation Studios, and distributed by Walt Disney Studios Motion Pictures. The eleventh short film in the SparkShorts series, the short film, which combines stop motion with computer animation, was released on February 2, 2024, on Disney+.

== Premise ==
A wooden doll who desperately wants to fit in makes an ill-fated wish upon a star, sparking a journey of self-discovery. Her desire to blend in with her peers leads her down a harmful path, challenging her perspective of both who she is and where she belongs.

== Development ==
On December 22, 2023, it was reported that Searit Kahsay Huluf would write and direct a stop motion/computer-animated short film titled Self. In a February 2024 interview, Huluf said that the thought of how she could self sabotage had initiated the idea behind the short, mentioning that she enjoyed the word self and following her emotions. According to Huluf, she had "so many of these moments where I would set myself up for failure. When I really want something – really, really want something – is when I usually self sabotage myself the most". She stated that Self had "someone who really, truly wants to belong and be like everyone else. But she does it in the worst way possible, which is like losing yourself in the process of doing that. And, you know, by the time she realizes it, which is the same as me whenever I realise I've gone too far, it's kind of too late. And I also have to suffer the consequences of my mistakes. And this is kind of the feelings and emotions I really wanted to follow".

Huluf wanted to tell a story about "one's relationship with themselves and how they see themselves in the world", further explaining "that was part of it and the other part was talking about the immigrant experience too. We don't have it blatantly saying she's an immigrant in the film, mainly because there's not any dialogue in it, but when you look at her design she does have African markings. She has the cross, the two elevens on the side of her eye, which means she's from the Tigray Region of Ethiopia. She has three kinds of carvings on her neck as well. I wanted to tell a story about an immigrant experience of coming to an urban city and the struggles of belonging and also directly indirectly being forced to conform."

== Music ==
Jennifer Rowekamp composed the music for Self. The score was released on February 2, 2024.

Self (Original Motion Picture Soundtrack)

Film score by Jennifer Rowekamp
- Released: February 2, 2024
- Genre: Film score
- Label: Hollywood

== Release ==
Self was released on February 2, 2024, as a Disney+ exclusive film.

=== Critical response ===
Lee Brown, of The Review Geek, gave the short a 7.5/10 rating, writing in a positive review "on the evidence of her work on the visually impressive Self, which manages to tell a strong message in a very short running time, we think Huluf is destined for even greater things in the future". Kaily Martinez, of The Daily Campus, gave the short a 5/5 rating, saying that "with the message of self-discovery and uncovering what it means to love yourself, the six-minute Self short is perfect for all audiences".

== Accolades ==
Self was nominated at the 56th NAACP Image Awards for "Outstanding Short Form (Animated)" and at the 25th Annual Black Reel Awards for "Outstanding Short Film".
