= Janet Lucroy =

American visual artist

Janet Lucroy is an American visual artist, working in the San Francisco Bay Area.

== About ==
She received her MFA degree in Art and Technology from the Ohio State University in 1997 and her BA degree in Fine Arts with a minor in Art History, Phi Beta Kappa, from Indiana University Bloomington in 1993. Her work has been shown throughout the United States. She has been an Artist-in-Residence at Kala Art Institute, and an Affiliate Artist at the Headlands Center for the Arts.

Lucroy worked at Pixar Animation Studios as Director of Photography for Lighting on the Academy-Award winning filmThe Incredibles (2004), Directing Lighting Artist on Monsters, Inc. (2001) and Lighting Artist on Toy Story 2 (1999) and A Bug's Life (1998).
