= Out (2020 film) =

2020 short film by Pixar

- Official release poster
- Directed by: Steven Clay Hunter
- Written by: Steven Clay Hunter
- Produced by: Max Sachar
- Starring: Caleb Cabrera; Matthew Martin; Kyle McDaniel; Bernadette Sullivan
- Cinematography: Matthew Silas (camera)
- Edited by: Noah Newman
- Music by: Jake Monaco
- Production company: Pixar Animation Studios
- Distributed by: Walt Disney Studios; Motion Pictures
- Release date: May 22, 2020 (Disney+)
- Running time: 9 minutes
- Country: United States
- Language: English

Out is a 2020 American animated short film directed and written by Steven Clay Hunter, produced by Max Sachar, and distributed by Pixar Animation Studios and Walt Disney Studios Motion Pictures. The plot features a young gay man who has not yet come out to his parents, who unexpectedly has his mind magically swapped with his dog's. The seventh short film in the SparkShorts series, it is both Disney's and Pixar's first short to feature a gay main character and storyline, including an on-screen same-sex kiss. The short was released on Disney+ on May 22, 2020. The short was shortlisted for the Academy Award for Best Animated Short Film at the 93rd Academy Awards.

== Plot ==
A magical cat and dog appear outside Greg's townhouse, as he and his boyfriend Manuel are packing his belongings to move. The cat imbues the collar of Greg's dog Jim with magic. Inside, reminiscing about a photo of them together, Manuel encourages Greg to come out to his parents, who unexpectedly show up to help. Greg hastily hides the photo and Manuel quietly exits by the back door. Holding Jim's collar, Greg casually wishes aloud that he would become a dog, and the minds of Greg and Jim magically switch bodies. "Greg" runs outside to play in the yard, where his stoic father is lighting the grill. "Jim" tries to get to him, while also frantically trying to prevent his eagerly helpful mother from finding the photo.

Frustrated by the dog's misbehavior, she sits and talks aloud of her sadness about her son moving away, as "Jim" listens. Imagining a conversation with Greg, she hopes that he finds someone who loves him, and "that he makes you happy". "Jim" suddenly realizes that she not only already knows that he is gay, but she also accepts it. He briefly comforts her, then chases down "Greg", and successfully switches their minds back. That evening, Greg introduces Manuel to his parents; Greg's father spontaneously hugs Manuel. The magical cat and dog see their mission accomplished, and leap away on a rainbow.

== Cast ==
- Caleb Cabrera as Manuel
- Matthew Martin as Gigi the Cat
- Kyle McDaniel as Greg
- Bernadette Sullivan as Greg's Mom

== Production ==
Out is the seventh film in Pixar's SparkShorts program. It was directed and written by Steven Clay Hunter, known for animation work on Finding Nemo and WALL-E, and produced by Max Sachar, known for his work on Coco and Toy Story 3.

== Music ==
Jake Monaco composed the music for Out. The score was released on July 3, 2020.

Out (Original Motion Picture Soundtrack)

Film score by Jake Monaco
- Released: July 3, 2020
- Genre: Film score
- Label: Hollywood

=== Track listing ===
All music is composed by Jake Monaco.

No.	Title	Length
1.	"Burying the Bone"	4:32
2.	"OUT"	0:51
3.	"Pink & Purple"	3:28
Total length:		8:51

== Release ==
Out was released on Disney+ on May 22, 2020, and on YouTube in June 2021 as part of the year's Pride Month celebrations.

== Reception ==
=== Critical response ===
Kshitij Rawat of The Indian Express stated Out explores the apprehensions felt by members of the LGBTQ community during the coming out, found the story emotional across its running time, and called the animation unique and fresh through its style. Jennifer Green of Common Sense Media rated the short film 5 out of 5 stars, praised the educational value, stating the short film promotes acceptance, and applauded the depiction of positive messages and role models, citing familial and romantic love.

=== Accolades ===
Year	Award	Category	Recipient(s)	Result	Ref.
2021	GLAAD Media Awards	Special Recognition	Out	Won	
2021	Academy Awards	Best Animated Short Film	Out	Shortlisted	
