= Twenty Something (2021 film) =

2021 animated short film by Aphton Corbin

- Official release poster
- Directed by: Aphton Corbin
- Written by: Aphton Corbin
- Produced by: Erik Langley
- Starring: Kaylin Price; Ariana Brown; Aliyah Taylor; Janelle Lasalle; Napoleon Highbrou
- Cinematography: Andrew Jimenez
- Edited by: Amera Rizk
- Music by: ASTU
- Production company: Pixar Animation Studios
- Distributed by: Walt Disney Studios; Motion Pictures
- Release date: September 10, 2021
- Running time: 7 minutes
- Country: United States
- Language: English

Twenty Something is a 2021 American 2D animated short film written and directed by Aphton Corbin, produced by Pixar Animation Studios, and distributed by Walt Disney Studios Motion Pictures. Starring Kaylin Price, Ariana Brown, Aliyah Taylor, Janelle Lasalle, and Napoleon Highbrou, the film focuses on Gia who deals with the insecurities of being a 21-year-old by personifying her emotions in the form of three children in a trenchcoat. The ninth short film in the SparkShorts series, the short was released on September 10, 2021, on Disney+.

== Plot ==
After she turned 21, Gia is brought to her first adult club by her older sister Nicole. Nervous about being an adult, Gia personifies herself as three kids (aged 10, 16, and 1) stacked on each other and wearing an overcoat. At first, Gia has trouble accepting her surroundings and runs to the bathroom. All three Gias argue with each other over their failed efforts in taking charge and resolve to simply make the best of their time together and act normal. Gia heads back onto the dance floor with Nicole and bumps into a man.

16 becomes enamored and attempts to take the reins of the situation, but 1 accidentally steps on his foot and scares him away. 10 gets into an argument with 16 and 1 tries to take control, only to accidentally throw up on another person. All three Gias fight until they spill out onto the dance floor, causing everyone to stop and stare. Humiliated, the Gias all flee to cry in the bathroom.

Nicole goes to check on her sister, telling her that she is aware of how hard it is to be an adult. After Nicole reveals her own embarrassing moment in her life, Gia is reminded that she has already accomplished many adult tasks, and that she will continue to do well. All three Gias hug and, upon leaving the stall, form back into 21-year-old Gia. As the sisters head back out, they imagine all the other clubbers at various ages and dance the night away.

== Cast ==
- Kaylin Price as 10-year-old Gia
- Ariana Brown as 16-year-old Gia
- Aliyah Taylor as 21-year-old Gia
- Janelle Lasalle as Nicole
- Napoleon Highbrou as Cute Dude

== Development ==
In January 2021, it was announced that Aphton Corbin began developing a feature film for Pixar. On July 21, 2021, it was reported that Corbin would write and direct a 2D animated short film titled Twenty Something prior to her theatrical film. In September 2021, Corbin described the short as "The story itself at its core is dealing with the insecurities of adulting". Corbin felt that "the hardest part to get right was locking in on after she has the conversation 'We're gonna go out there and have fun!' trying to find the tight way to wrap that moment up before she ends up back in the bathroom. Just like what she was going to do there and how that was going to lead her to mess up."

She also thought there was "a lot of back and forth on how to portray this fantasy of Gia and make sure that that stayed tight before we reveal that all three of them are one person. That was the hardest thing, and dialing that in. And I just thought that I needed to have fun and just make a lot of fun stuff happen to her in Act Two that would be entertaining for people to watch." Corbin said "the original idea stems from me being a 20-something entering the workforce for the first time at Pixar and feeling all of the inadequacies that are coming at you all at once, am I a successful adult or am I bunch of kids running around to make it work? This was fun to visualize [adulting] as a short."

== Music ==
ASTU composed the music for Twenty Something. The score was released on September 10, 2021. The song "Hold the Line" was released for digital download.

Twenty Something (Original Motion Picture Soundtrack)

Film score by ASTU
- Released: September 10, 2021
- Genre: Film score
- Label: Hollywood

=== Track listing ===
All music is composed by ASTU.

No.	Title	Length
1.	"Hold the Line"	3:00
Total length:		3:00

== Release ==
Twenty Something was released on September 10, 2021, as a Disney+ exclusive film.

== Reception ==
Bill Desowitz of IndieWire gave a positive review, saying Twenty Something "is a clever and funny 2D short". Brandon Zachary of Comic Book Resources also gave a positive review, saying "it's a sharp and sweet short, with a clear and relatable point about growing up, all grounded by sleek and stylish designs." Shawn Jackson, of That Hashtag Show gave the short an 88% rating, saying "this touching and hilarious little movie is probably the best out of the bunch of Sparkshorts that Pixar has just released."

=== Accolades ===
The film was nominated at the 53rd NAACP Image Awards for Best Short-Form (Animated).

== See also ==
- A Spark Story, a documentary focused on the production of Twenty Something.
