= Float (2019 film) =

2019 short film by Bobby Rubio

- Official release poster
- Directed by: Bobby Rubio
- Written by: Bobby Rubio
- Produced by: Krissy Cababa
- Starring: Bobby Rubio; Eli Fucile; Luna Watson; Mika Kubo
- Cinematography: Shaun Seong-young Kim (camera); Michael Sparber (lighting)
- Edited by: Gregory Amundson
- Music by: Barney Jones
- Production company: Pixar Animation Studios
- Distributed by: Walt Disney Studios; Motion Pictures
- Release date: November 12, 2019 (Disney+)
- Running time: 7 minutes
- Country: United States
- Language: English

Float is a 2019 American animated comedy short film directed and written by Bobby Rubio, produced by Pixar Animation Studios, and distributed by Walt Disney Studios Motion Pictures. It is the fourth film in Pixar's SparkShorts program, and focuses on a son's ability to fly and the choice his father must make. The short was released on Disney+ on November 12, 2019.

== Plot ==
A father is playing with his infant son, Alex, in the front yard of their house. When the father picks a dandelion and blows off the seeds, Alex begins to float in mid-air. The father is initially amazed, but grows concerned when neighbors notice Alex and hurriedly takes his son inside. Time passes and Alex, now four years old, is still floating around the house. When Alex and his father go for a walk, the father keeps him on a leash and loads his backpack with rocks to weigh him down.

When they pass a playground, Alex escapes from his bondage and begins floating again. The father tries to drag Alex away from the park, but Alex's frustrated cries cause the father to label him as abnormal (the only moment of dialogue in the film). Alex grounds himself and begins to cry. The remorseful father holds Alex in his arms and sits on the swing set, swinging back and forth to reinvigorate his son, and launches him into the air. Alex continues to float as his father happily runs underneath him.

== Cast ==
- Eli Fucile as baby Alex
- Luna Watson as four-year-old Alex
- Bobby Rubio as Alex's father
- Mika Kubo as additional voices

== Production ==
Float is a short film that was directed and written by Bobby Rubio, and produced by Krissy Cababa and Pixar Animation Studios; it was distributed by Walt Disney Studios Motion Pictures. It is the fourth film of Pixar's SparkShorts program, and it lasts approximately seven minutes. In January 2019, Rubio described the program as "different films from the kinds of films" developed at Pixar, while executive producer Lindsey Collins said that the shorts are referred to as "SparkShorts" because Pixar "[wants] to discover that creative spark" in its employees. Rubio viewed the program as "a wonderful opportunity to tell [his] story". He stated that Float is inspired by his son, who is autistic, and that he identified with the father from the short. Rubio said that the boy from the short is "different from other children" since he can float. He commented that while "the father loves his son wholeheartedly without restriction" at first, this begins to be altered by what the other people say; as a result, he has to choose between deciding they are right and ignoring their thoughts.

Since his son was growing up, Rubio decided he had "to tell this story" and "started storyboarding it". The initial storyboards contained Caucasian characters, but one of Rubio's co-workers told him that he should depict Filipino-American characters instead. While he was initially unsure of this idea, he decided to make this change to "empower [his son] and empower children of color". Rubio wanted to incorporate some of his own features as a Filipino-American into the characters' designs in order to make them look "authentic". He commented that he was very "proud" that Float was released during Filipino American History Month. Rubio said that seeing the viewers react to some scenes in the way he had expected them to was "amazing", stating that he "totally loved it". According to Rubio, viewers had "several different" interpretations of the film.

Krissy Cababa described Float as "a powerful story about being a parent and the struggles you go through as a parent with your kids". She also characterized it as "an important story about acceptance and being able to love and celebrate the people in our lives". Cababa said the short "was about celebrating people for who they are and not who you want them to be". She stated that "people are talking about representation" due to Float, "sharing what this means to them and its importance". She mentioned that the short is "a huge deal". Cababa said the short had received "so much support" and a "positive feedback", saying this had been "really overwhelming".

== Music ==
Barney Jones, who composed the music for the previous "SparkShorts" entry Smash and Grab, composed the music for Float. The score was released on February 28, 2020.

Float (Original Motion Picture Soundtrack)

Film score by Barney Jones
- Released: February 28, 2020
- Genre: Film score
- Label: Hollywood

=== Track listing ===
All music is composed by Barney Jones.

No.	Title	Length
1.	"Bouncing Baby"	1:33
2.	"Duck and Cover & Regret"	1:17
3.	"I See You"	1:18
4.	"Float End Credits"	1:10
5.	"Float Alternate End Credits"	1:07
Total length:		6:25

== Release ==
Float was released on Disney+ on November 12, 2019, alongside fellow "SparkShorts" entries Purl, Smash and Grab, and Kitbull.

== Reception ==
Float has obtained a generally positive critical response, with writers deeming it "touching", "moving", and "spot on". The child on whom the short is centered was characterized as "extremely cute", and as "adorable". Alex Abad-Santos of Vox described the short as "one of the best new things on Disney+". He commented that "facial expressions and body language carry the story" despite the general lack of dialogue, adding that "a small shift in posture or the way a frown sharpens an entire face wields so much emotion". Abad-Santos stated that the short's "core story could be a story about assimilation and growing up as a minority" or "it could be about what [it is] like to feel different from those around you". He said that "Float taps into the human instinct to fiercely protect someone you love, the worry that the world out there [will not] see them the way you do, and the hope that that big scary world will love this person as much as you do"; he stated that while this "sounds like a lot of ground to cover in seven minutes", the short manages to do that very well. Fortune's Ellen McGirt said that Rubio's "own fear that his son would be judged by others is palpable" through this short. Float was described as "a film about acceptance" with "a heartwarming story".
