= Smash and Grab (2019 film) =

2019 short film by Brian Larsen

- Official poster
- Directed by: Brian Larsen
- Written by: Brian Larsen
- Produced by: David Lally
- Starring: Kenny Pickett
- Cinematography: Matthew Silas (camera); Farhez Rayani (lighting)
- Edited by: Nicole Vanderneut
- Music by: Barney Jones
- Production company: Pixar Animation Studios
- Distributed by: Walt Disney Studios; Motion Pictures
- Release dates: January 18, 2019 (El Capitan Theatre); February 11, 2019 (YouTube)
- Running time: 8 minutes
- Country: United States
- Language: English

Smash and Grab is a 2019 American animated science fiction action adventure short film directed and written by Brian Larsen, produced by Pixar Animation Studios, and distributed by Walt Disney Studios Motion Pictures. It is the second film in Pixar's SparkShorts program, and focuses on two robots who try to escape from their work routine. The short premiered at the El Capitan Theatre on January 18, 2019, before being released on YouTube on February 11, 2019. The short was also released on Disney+ on November 12, 2019.

== Plot ==
Smash and Grab, two laborer robots who live on a futuristic Mars-like planet, work in a giant train fueled by glowing rocks. Smash breaks the rocks apart, and tosses them to Grab, who feeds them into the train's engine. They attempt to amuse themselves by turning their work into a game, but are hindered from moving freely about the room or seeing out the window by their power cables. The cords are so short that the robots cannot touch each other, even to high five, much to Smash's frustration.

One day, Smash builds itself a stack of rocks so it can partially see out the window. It learns there is a world outside the train, and that all the free robots move about unhindered thanks to spherical batteries, which can attach to the same port the power cables do. Seeing that some of these batteries have been loaded onto the train, Smash cuts its power cable and uses what little power it has left to steal two batteries, attaching one to itself and the other to Grab so they can flee together.

Security robots pursue Smash and Grab and attempt to kill them before they reach freedom. Trapped atop the train, Smash catches and throws security robots to Grab when they come through the door. Grab flings them against obstacles the train passes, noticing their batteries explode if damaged. One security robot manages to shoot Grab's arm off. Grab deactivates, and Smash attempts to revive its friend, but is confronted by eight security robots. Smash deliberately damages its own battery and throws it at the security robots. The battery explodes, causing a chain reaction which kills the security robots and derails the train.

In the crater left by the explosion, Grab reactivates, finds a powered down but intact Smash, and connects its battery to Smash via a cable so both of them can share its power. The two high five for the first time, and set out to explore the outside world together.

== Cast ==
- Kenny Pickett

== Production ==
Smash and Grab is the second short of Pixar's SparkShorts program, which consists in Pixar giving employees six months and limited budgets to produce short animated films. Writer/director Brian Larsen was inspired by the concept of people wanting a change in routine, particularly him wanting a change in his work as a head of story in Pixar. Larsen used robots as main characters in the film because he felt it was "a nice way to express" the idea of wanting a change. As the film focused on robots, Larsen developed it as a science fiction film, which departs from most of Pixar's previous projects (with the exception of WALL-E).

Larsen and the animators used Art Deco designs for the film, as Larson felt that "it felt heavy, it felt fast". The animators also used "simple" character designs in the short, which Larsen described as "almost like appliance toasters". The animators also used motion-capture for Smash and Grab's movements, while having screens in the same room to animate their movements as the characters, something Larsen said it was in order "to capture data and very quickly get [the character's movements] into the computer". Larsen was very pleased with the film's production, stating that he "[loves] making [the] story come to life".

== Music ==
Barney Jones, who composed the music for the Pixar short film Float, composed the music for Smash and Grab. The score was released on April 19, 2019.

Smash and Grab (Original Motion Picture Soundtrack)

Film score by Barney Jones
- Released: April 19, 2019
- Genre: Film score
- Label: Hollywood

=== Track listing ===
All music is composed by Barney Jones.

No.	Title	Length
1.	"Train World"	1:16
2.	"Play Time"	0:51
3.	"Out There"	2:53
4.	"Get Out"	0:38
5.	"Showdown Robot Bromance"	1:34
Total length:		7:12

== Reception ==
Smash and Grab received generally positive reviews from critics, with many positively comparing the short to Pixar's feature film WALL-E. Jacob Oller, of Syfy Wire, wrote that the short "is a delightful bit of art deco sci-fi outside of Wall-E's decrepit view of the future". Chelsea Steiner, of The Mary Sue, said that "Smash and Grab, like its predecessor Purl, takes a simple idea and expands it with delightful and entertaining results. It makes us root for two wordless robots and care for them over the course of an 8-minute runtime. That’s animation at its finest". Andy Meek, of BGR, wrote: "if you loved Wall-E, you’ll definitely want to check out these ridiculously adorable robots performing mindless, factory-like jobs and somehow managing to exude charm and likeability with their beeps and boops, human-like motion and luminescent eyes a la our protagonist from Wall-E". Similarly, Michelle Jaworski, of The Daily Dot, said that "Smash and Grab will instantly invoke images and comparisons to Wall-E for its futuristic feel and the robotic focus". Alex Reif, of Laughing Place, said that "[f]ans of WALL-E will feel instantly welcomed into the world of Smash and Grab", and felt that the short has "a clear message inspired by a major societal issue. However, it handles it far more delicately and with a lot more subtlety. This story about two workers who don’t get the same luxuries as those who control them also doesn’t present a sugary solution to a problem while ignoring others".

== Release ==
Smash and Grab had its world premiere, along with the shorts Purl and Kitbull, on January 18, 2019, at the El Capitan Theatre. The short was released on Pixar's YouTube channel on February 11, 2019, and on Disney+ on November 12, 2019, alongside fellow "SparkShorts" entries Purl, Kitbull, and Float.
