= Purl (film) =

2019 short film by Kristen Lester

- Official poster
- Directed by: Kristen Lester
- Screenplay by: Kristen Lester
- Story by: Michael Daley; Bradley Furnish; Kristen Lester; James Robertson
- Produced by: Gillian Libbert-Duncan
- Starring: Bret Parker; Emily Davis
- Cinematography: Matthew Silas(camera); Farhez Rayani(lighting)
- Edited by: Bradley Furnish
- Music by: Pinar Toprak
- Production company: Pixar Animation Studios
- Distributed by: Walt Disney Studios; Motion Pictures
- Release dates: August 14, 2018 (SIGGRAPH); January 18, 2019 (El Capitan Theatre); February 4, 2019 (YouTube); November 12, 2019 (Disney+)
- Running time: 8 minutes
- Country: United States
- Language: English

Purl is a 2018 American animated short film directed and written by Kristen Lester with the story boarded by Michael Daley, Bradley Furnish, Lester, and James Robertson, produced by Pixar Animation Studios, and distributed by Walt Disney Studios Motion Pictures. It is the first short released as part of Pixar's SparkShorts program and focuses on a ball of yarn named Purl, who gets employed in a male-dominant company, which causes her to be ignored by her fellow employees. The short was previewed at SIGGRAPH on August 14, 2018, premiered at the El Capitan Theatre on January 18, 2019, and released on YouTube on February 4, 2019, and on Disney+ on November 12, 2019, to acclaim from critics, particularly for its themes.

== Plot ==
Purl, an anthropomorphic pink-coloured ball of yarn, begins an entry-level position at a company named B.R.O. Capital. While excited at first to work there, she soon realizes that her partners barely notice her, despite her attempts to fit in. After being left alone while her coworkers go out for a group lunch, Purl observes from photos of the company's capital team that it is composed entirely of white men in similar power suits and hairstyles. This inspires her to change her appearance and personality to resemble theirs. After the other employees return, Purl, now talking and acting like everyone else, is noticed by her coworkers, who invite her out for drinks. Before the group leaves, however, a yellow-coloured ball of yarn named Lacy arrives at the office to begin working. When she notices the new ball of yarn is also ignored, Purl befriends Lacy and invites her to join them for drinks. After some time has passed, Purl has returned to her original appearance and B.R.O. Capital is shown to be staffed by a more diverse combination of men and balls of yarn, who work together as a team.

== Cast ==
- Bret Parker as Purl
- Emily Davis as Lacy

Pixar employees Michael Daley, Michael Frederickson, Erik Langley, Jimmy Lillard, Austin Madison, Kelsey Mann, Kyle McDaniel, Victor Navone and Michael Yates provided the voices for the male employees at B.R.O. Capital, while Aphton Corbin, Mitra Shahidi, and Pixar director Domee Shi voiced the female employees.

== Production ==
Purl is the first short of Pixar's SparkShorts program, in which employees at Pixar are given six months and limited budgets to produce short animated films. Producer Gillian Libbert-Duncan described the short as "a movie about belonging". Writer/director Kristen Lester was inspired by her first experiences working in animation, in which she was the lone female, in writing the film's story. Lester related that to fit in, she "sort of became one of the guys"; her move to Pixar where she worked on a team with female employees helped her rediscover the female aspects of herself that she had suppressed. When she explained the story and concept to Libbert, Libbert also related to being a woman in a male-dominated world.

Lester has described the B.R.O. Capital office as "a hyperreal office". Animators developed the office so it could seem "modern and sleek", so the character of Purl, whom she described as "fluffy" and "fuzzy", could be easier to portray "as an outsider". Lester explained that her choice of depicting Purl as a ball of yarn was inspired by her hobby of yarn bombing, and how that activity demonstrated the versatility of yarn. Lester also borrowed elements from movies like Working Girl and 9 to 5 for the story. Purl is one of the first original Pixar productions not to involve former Chief Creative Officer John Lasseter, who left Pixar in June 2018 due to allegations of sexual misconduct towards female employees.

== Music ==
Purl (Original Motion Picture Soundtrack)

Film score by Pinar Toprak
- Released: March 15, 2019
- Genre: Film score
- Length: 8:27
- Label: Hollywood

Pinar Toprak chronology
| The Angel (2018) | Purl (Original Motion Picture Soundtrack) (2019) | Captain Marvel (2019) |

The short's music was composed by Pinar Toprak, who was inspired by jazz music for the score's sound style. Toprak first hinted the score's release in a soundtrack on February 22, 2019. The film's soundtrack, featuring Toprak's score, was released on March 15, 2019, making Purl the first Pixar short to have a soundtrack released, the second Pixar non-film product to have a soundtrack released (after Toy Story of Terror!), and the third Pixar short to have its original music released (after Lava, and Partysaurus Rex, both of whom released songs created for the shorts).

=== Track listing ===
All music is composed by Pinar Toprak.

| No. | Title | Length |
|---|---|---|
| 1. | "B.R.O Capital" | 1:10 |
| 2. | "First Day on the Job" | 2:42 |
| 3. | "Purl Has an Idea" | 0:24 |
| 4. | "Happy Hour" | 1:42 |
| 5. | "Lacy" | 0:42 |
| 6. | "It's Unbeweavable!" | 1:01 |
| 7. | "Purl" | 0:48 |
| Total length: | | 8:27 |

== Reception and analysis ==
The short was met with universal acclaim, with many critics praising it as an allegory for feminism. KC Ifeanyi, of FastCompany, wrote that the film "should be the new workplace sensitivity training video for certain startups and corporations" due to its story, while Molly Freeman, of ScreenRant, said that "Purl touches on the phenomenon of male-dominated workplaces, particularly what women do (or feel they need to do) to fit in within those offices", and felt that "[f]olks who have felt similarly ostracized in their workplaces will no doubt relate to Purl". Proma Khosla, of Mashable, wrote that the film is "a transparent allegory for women trying to break the glass ceiling in corporate culture". Marc Snetiker, of Entertainment Weekly, said that the film "[comments] quickly but efficiently on the prevalence of toxic masculinity in office culture and the old boys’ club social systems in place across corporate America". Chris Morris, of Fortune, said that "the fingerprints of the Me Too movement against sexual harassment in the office are all over the film", feeling that it "takes aim at testosterone-laden cultures and the importance of workplace diversity". Samantha Leach, of Glamour, said that "[w]hether you're a woman, trans, a person of color, or a ball of yarn, Purl is an extremely relatable symbol for the need for diversity in the workplace". Andre Todd, of Birth.Movies.Death, said that Purl "is both a terrific short, and a commentary on the toxic environments common to many workplaces in the animation industry and beyond. It can even be read, specifically, as a commentary on Pixar itself". Emily Canal, of Inc., said that "[t]he short emphasizes the importance of workplace inclusivity and diversity as Purl is ignored, shut down at meetings, and excluded from out-of-office bonding events simply because she's different", and that "the film is cute, but it also tackles two long-running complaints about male-dominated industries like tech and venture capital: They're still way behind in terms of hiring diverse teams and publicly reporting those figures, two things HR managers say are key to preventing toxic or alienating work cultures".

Renee Nelson, of 92 Moose, was very pleased with the film's themes, comparing herself to the title character, writing: "I have been in many of these situations over the years. Over time I have seen many women post they have not faced this type of environment and to them I say FANTASTIC! I am happy for you, not all of us have been so lucky". Rae Alexandra, of KQED, said that "[t]he genius of Purl is that she captures, in eight delightful minutes, both the importance of diversifying workplaces and the difficulties faced by the pioneers who do so". Sophia Confort, of Associations Now, said that Purl "pinpoints where organizations should put more effort if they’re committed to more diverse and inclusive teams". Chris Morris of World Economic Forum praised the short for its differences with previous Pixar productions, writing that "[i]t's raunchy (well, by Pixar standards at least), features the word 'ass,' and isn't afraid to confront current affair issues in a direct manner". Purl was also met with a positive reception in social media.

== Release ==
The short was first released as a preview at SIGGRAPH on August 14, 2018. It then had its world premiere at the El Capitan Theatre on January 18, 2019 along with Smash and Grab and Kitbull. The short was officially released on Pixar's YouTube channel on February 4, 2019, and on Disney+ on November 12, 2019, alongside fellow "SparkShorts" entries Smash and Grab, Kitbull, and Float.
