= Nona (2021 film) =

2021 animated short film by Louis Gonzales

- Official release poster
- Directed by: Louis Gonzales
- Screenplay by: Louis Gonzales
- Story by: Mike Wu
- Produced by: Courtney Casper Kent
- Starring: Wilma Bonet; Devon Libran
- Cinematography: Andrea Goh; John McGuire
- Edited by: Jennifer Jew
- Music by: Cristy Road Carrera
- Production company: Pixar Animation Studios
- Distributed by: Walt Disney Studios; Motion Pictures
- Release date: September 17, 2021
- Running time: 8 minutes
- Country: United States
- Language: English

Nona is a 2021 American animated short film written and directed by Louis Gonzales, produced by Pixar Animation Studios, and distributed by Walt Disney Studios Motion Pictures. Starring Wilma Bonet as the title character, the short focuses on Nona who desires to watch her wrestling show, but is interrupted by an unexpected visit from her young granddaughter. The tenth short film in the SparkShorts series, the short was released on September 17, 2021, on Disney+.

== Plot ==
Nona tunes in to her favorite television show, E.W.W. Smashdown Wrestling, a pastime she shared with her late husband. She suddenly hears a knock on the door and discovers her granddaughter Renee has been dropped off by her daughter. She tries to continue watching the show, but Renee gets in the way, making Nona frustrated.

Nona tries to distract Renee with crayons, Legos and her dog, but Renee keeps finding ways to get in Nona's way of watching television. Eventually, Renee catches what Nona is watching and tries to emulate what she sees by jumping from the stairs. Nona rushes up to catch her and accidentally knocks over the television, damaging it and she says oh, **** (the only moment of dialogue in the film). Due to the lost connection Nona had to watching E.W.W. Smashdown Wrestling with her late husband, Nona breaks down in tears. Seeing how sad she is, Renee emulates a wrestler for her and they enter a fantasy sequence of the two of them wrestling against each other. Nona and Renee laugh together.

In a post-credits scene, Nona is on the couch with a sleeping dog and Renee on top of her as the latter's favorite show Kitty Kitty Dance Party plays. Nona tries to reach for the remote, but it falls to the floor, frustrating her.

== Cast ==
- Wilma Bonet as Nona
- Devon Libran as Wrestling Announcer

== Development ==
On July 21, 2021, it was reported that Louis Gonzales would write and direct a CGI animated short film titled Nona. In September 2021, Gonzales described the short as "The story itself at its core is a grandmother and her grandchild bonding over wrestling". Gonzales' own grandmother visited him during his childhood and talked passionately about wrestling.

He also "found it exciting to be presenting a grandmother that is not like the grandmas we're used to seeing." During the short's development, he discovered that his ideas were "pulling from [my] family. Like it was always my life –my people, my loves that kept coming back into the story, and kept feeding it".

== Music ==
Cristy Road Carrera composed the music for Nona. The score was released on September 17, 2021.

Nona (Original Motion Picture Soundtrack)

Film score by Cristy Road Carrera
- Released: September 17, 2021
- Genre: Film score
- Label: Hollywood

=== Track listing ===
All music is composed by Cristy Road Carrera.

No.	Title	Length
1.	"Peo Atravesado"	3:00
Total length:		3:00

== Release ==
Nona was released on September 17, 2021, as a Disney+ exclusive film.

== Reception ==
Bill Desowitz of IndieWire gave a positive review, saying Nona "leads to a satisfying compromise". Jon Hofferman, writing for Animation World Network, also gave a positive review, saying the short "combines childhood memories, family life, and wild takedown action".

== Accolades ==
Nona was nominated at the 46th Humanitas Prize awards for best "Short Film" and at the 5th Hollywood Critics Association Film Awards for Best Short-Form (Animated).

== See also ==
- A Spark Story, a documentary focused on the production of Nona.
