= List of Pixar shorts =

This is a list of animated short films produced by Pixar Animation Studios.

Beginning with Pixar's second feature-length film A Bug's Life, almost all subsequent Pixar feature films have been shown in theaters along with a Pixar-created original short film, known as a "short." Other Pixar shorts, released only on home media, were created to showcase Pixar's technology or cinematic capabilities, or on commission for clients.

Pixar began producing shorts in the 1980s. The first shorts were made while Pixar was still a computer hardware company, when John Lasseter was the only professional animator in the company's small animation department. Starting with Geri's Game, after Pixar had converted into an animation studio, all later shorts have been produced with a larger crew and budget.

Pixar produced four CGI shorts for the educational TV series Sesame Street between 1990 and 1994. The shorts illustrate different weights and directions starring Luxo Jr. and Luxo — Light & Heavy, Surprise, Up and Down, and Front and Back.

During the development of Toy Story, Pixar set up a division to work on Pixar video games called Pixar's Interactive Products Group, specifically Toy Story entries in the Disney's Animated Storybook and Disney's Activity Center. Due to the intense resources required, the division was eventually folded and the staff were redistributed to start creating short films to accompany Pixar's theatrical releases.

Beginning with A Bug's Life, Pixar has created extra content for each of their films that are part of the main story. For their early theatrical releases, this content was in the form of outtakes and appeared as part of the film's credits. For each of their films, this content was a short made exclusively for the DVD release of the film.

Toy Story 4 is the first film not to be accompanied by short films at the beginning, followed by Lightyear, Inside Out 2, Elio, Hoppers, and Toy Story 5. Producer Lindsey Collins confirmed that SparkShorts replaces the need to pair short films with their major theatrical films; admitting that she felt "torn" over the decision. Meanwhile, Toy Story, Coco, and Onward had theatrical shorts from other subsidiaries related to Disney.

== Shorts ==
=== Short films ===
Title	Year	Director(s)	Initial release with		Academy Award for Best Animated Short Film
Title	Year	Director(s)	Theatrical	Home/Premiere	Academy Award for Best Animated Short Film
The Adventures of André & Wally B. (Note: Produced by The Graphics Group, a subsidiary of Lucasfilm which is a predecessor to Pixar, later releases add Pixar branding to the posters.)	1984	Alvy Ray Smith			
Luxo Jr.	1986	John Lasseter	Toy Story 2		Nominated
Red's Dream	1987	John Lasseter			
Tin Toy	1988	John Lasseter		Toy Story	Won
Knick Knack	1989	John Lasseter	Finding Nemo (first release); The Nightmare Before Christmas (second release)	Finding Nemo	
Geri's Game	1997	Jan Pinkava	A Bug's Life		Won
For the Birds	2000	Ralph Eggleston	Monsters, Inc. (first release); Luca (second release)	Monsters, Inc.	Won
Boundin'	2003	Bud Luckey	The Incredibles		Nominated
One Man Band	2005	Andrew Jimenez and Mark Andrews	Cars		Nominated
Lifted	2006	Gary Rydstrom	Ratatouille		Nominated
Presto	2008	Doug Sweetland	WALL-E		Nominated
Partly Cloudy	2009	Peter Sohn	Up		Shortlisted
Day & Night	2010	Teddy Newton	Toy Story 3		Nominated
La Luna	2011	Enrico Casarosa	Brave		Nominated
The Blue Umbrella	2013	Saschka Unseld	Monsters University		
Lava	2014	James Ford Murphy	Inside Out		
Sanjay's Super Team	2015	Sanjay Patel	The Good Dinosaur		Nominated
Piper	2016	Alan Barillaro	Finding Dory		Won
Lou	2017	David Mullins	Cars 3		Nominated
Bao	2018	Domee Shi	Incredibles 2		Won

=== Bonus feature ===
Title	Year	Director(s)	Initial release with		Associated Feature Film	Academy Award for Best Animated Short Film
Title	Year	Director(s)	Theatrical	Home (Note: Non-compilation)/Premiere	Associated Feature Film	Academy Award for Best Animated Short Film
Mike's New Car	2002	Pete Docter and Roger Gould		Monsters, Inc.		Nominated
Exploring the Reef	2003	Roger Gould		Finding Nemo		
Jack-Jack Attack	2005	Brad Bird		The Incredibles		
Mr. Incredible and Pals	2005	Roger Gould		The Incredibles		
Mater and the Ghostlight	2006	John Lasseter		Cars		
Your Friend the Rat	2007	Jim Capobianco		Ratatouille		
BURN-E	2008	Angus MacLane		WALL-E		
Dug's Special Mission	2009	Ronnie del Carmen		Up		
George and A.J.	2009	Josh Cooley		Up		
The Legend of Mor'du	2012	Brian Larsen		Brave		
Party Central	2013	Kelsey Mann	Muppets Most Wanted	Disney Movies Anywhere; Pixar Short Films Collection, Volume 3	Monsters University	
Riley's First Date?	2015	Josh Cooley		Inside Out		
Marine Life Interviews	2016	Ross Haldane Stevenson		Finding Dory		
Miss Fritter's Racing Skoool	2017	James Ford Murphy		Cars 3		
Dante's Lunch	2017	Jason Katz		Coco		
Auntie Edna	2018	Ted Mathot		Incredibles 2		
Lamp Life	2020	Valerie LaPointe		Disney+	Toy Story 4	
22 vs. Earth	2021	Kevin Nolting		Disney+	Soul	
Ciao Alberto	2021	Kenna Harris		Disney+	Luca	
Loving Dory	2027	Lou Hamou-Lhadj	Gatto	Disney+	Finding Dory	

=== SparkShorts series ===
SparkShorts is a series of animated short films produced by Pixar filmmakers and artists, similar to its sister series Short Circuit from Walt Disney Animation Studios. It consists of longer independent shorts. Under the project, Pixar's employees are merely given six months and limited budgets to develop these animated short films.

Title	Year	Director(s)	Premiered	Academy Award for Best Animated Short Film
Purl	2019	Kristen Lester	YouTube	
Smash and Grab	2019	Brian Larsen	YouTube	
Kitbull	2019	Rosana Sullivan	YouTube; Theatrical with Turning Red	Nominated
Float	2019	Bobby Alcid Rubio	Disney+	
Wind	2019	Edwin Chang	Disney+	
Loop	2020	Erica Milsom	Disney+	
Out	2020	Steven Clay Hunter	Disney+	Shortlisted
Burrow	2020	Madeline Sharafian	Theatrical with Soul	Nominated
Twenty Something	2021	Aphton Corbin	Disney+	
Nona	2021	Louis Gonzales	Disney+	
Self	2024	Searit Kahsay Huluf	Disney+	

=== Pixar Popcorn ===
Title	Associated Feature Film	Year(s)	Director(s)	Premiere
To Fitness and Beyond	Toy Story 4	2021	Adam Rodriguez	Disney+
Unparalleled Parking	Cars 3	2021	James Ford Murphy	Disney+
Dory Finding	Finding Dory	2021	Michal Makarewicz	Disney+
Soul of the City	Soul	2021	Christopher Chua	Disney+
Fluffy Stuff with Ducky and Bunny: Love	Toy Story 4	2021	Robert H. Russ	Disney+
Chore Day the Incredibles Way	Incredibles 2	2021	Alan Barillaro	Disney+
A Day in the Life of the Dead	Coco	2021	Allison Rutland	Disney+
Fluffy Stuff with Ducky and Bunny: Three Heads	Toy Story 4	2021	Robert H. Russ	Disney+
Dancing with the Cars	Cars 3	2021	Juan Carlos Navarro Carrión	Disney+
Cookie Num Num	Incredibles 2	2021	Jae Hyung Kim	Disney+

=== A Pixar Artist's Short Film ===
Title	Year(s)	Director(s)	Franchise(s)	Premiere
Lightbulb	2026	Hye Sung Park	N/A	YouTube
Mother's Nature	2026	Valerie LaPointe	N/A	YouTube
One Shot Productions	2026	Brian Larsen and James Reinhart Robertson	N/A	YouTube
Tuck & Roll Change a Lightbulb	2026	John Hoffman	A Bug's Life	YouTube
Fruit & Nut	2026	Rejean Bourdages and Tony Maki	N/A	YouTube
Driving Lesson	2026	Hosuk Chang	N/A	YouTube
Night Crawler	2026	Rejean Bourdages	The Incredibles	YouTube
Love on a Plate	2026	Ana G. Lacaze	N/A	YouTube

== Short series ==
=== Cars Toons ===
Cars Toons is an American animated short series based on the Cars franchise, featuring Lightning McQueen, Mater, and other characters in comedic adventures. Larry the Cable Guy reprises his role as Mater, while Keith Ferguson voices Lightning McQueen until Owen Wilson returns in “The Radiator Springs 500 ½”. The series premiered on October 27, 2008, with “Rescue Squad Mater” and aired on Disney Channel, Toon Disney, and ABC Family. The shorts were also released on home media and in theaters. The series concluded on May 20, 2014.

==== Mater's Tall Tales ====
Title	Year	Director(s)	Premiered
Rescue Squad Mater	2008	John Lasseter	Toon Disney
Mater the Greater	2008	John Lasseter	Toon Disney
El Materdor	2008	John Lasseter	Toon Disney
Tokyo Mater	2008	John Lasseter	Theatrical with Bolt
Unidentified Flying Mater	2009	John Lasseter	Disney Channel
Monster Truck Mater	2010	John Lasseter	Disney Channel
Heavy Metal Mater	2010	John Lasseter	Disney Channel
Moon Mater	2010	Robert Gibbs	DVD + Blu-ray with Mater's Tall Tales
Mater Private Eye	2010	Robert Gibbs	DVD + Blu-ray with Mater's Tall Tales
Air Mater	2011	Robert Gibbs	DVD + Blu-ray with Cars 2
Time Travel Mater	2012	Robert Gibbs	Disney Channel

==== Tales from Radiator Springs ====
Title	Year	Director(s)	Premiered
Hiccups	2013	Jeremy Lasky	Disney Channel
Bugged	2013	Jeremy Lasky	Disney Channel
Spinning	2013	Jeremy Lasky	Disney Channel
The Radiator Springs 500½	2014	Robert Gibbs	Disney Movies Anywhere

=== Toy Story Toons ===
Title	Year	Director(s)	Premiered
Hawaiian Vacation	2011	Gary Rydstrom	Theatrical with Cars 2
Small Fry	2011	Angus MacLane	Theatrical with The Muppets
Partysaurus Rex	2012	Mark Walsh	Theatrical with Finding Nemo 3D

=== Forky Asks a Question ===
Title	Year(s)	Director(s)	Premiered
What Is Money?	2019	Bob Peterson	Disney+
What Is a Friend?	2019	Bob Peterson	Disney+
What Is Art?	2019	Bob Peterson	Disney+
What Is Time?	2019	Bob Peterson	Disney+
What Is Love?	2019	Bob Peterson	Disney+
What Is a Computer?	2019	Bob Peterson	Disney+
What Is a Leader?	2019	Bob Peterson	Disney+
What Is a Pet?	2019	Bob Peterson	Disney+
What Is Cheese?	2020	Bob Peterson	Disney+
What Is Reading?	2020	Bob Peterson	Disney+

=== Dug Days ===
Title	Year(s)	Director(s)	Premiered
Squirrel!	2021	Bob Peterson	Disney+
Puppies	2021	Bob Peterson	Disney+
Flowers	2021	Bob Peterson	Disney+
Smell	2021	Bob Peterson	Disney+
Science	2021	Bob Peterson	Disney+
Carl's Date	2023	Bob Peterson	Theatrical with Elemental

=== Cars on the Road ===
Title	Year(s)	Director(s)	Premiered
Dino Park	2022	Steve Purcell	Disney+
Lights Out	2022	Steve Purcell	Disney+
Salt Fever	2022	Brian Fee	Disney+
The Legend	2022	Brian Fee	Disney+
Show Time	2022	Bobby Podesta	Disney+
Trucks	2022	Bobby Podesta	Disney+
B-Movie	2022	Brian Fee	Disney+
Road Rumblers	2022	Steve Purcell	Disney+
Gettin' Hitched	2022	Bobby Podesta	Disney+

== Compilations ==
Compilation title	Release date	Format
Tiny Toy Stories	October 29, 1996	VHS
Pixar Short Films Collection, Volume 1	November 6, 2007	DVD, Blu-ray, Digital download
Cars Toons: Mater's Tall Tales	November 2, 2010	DVD, Blu-ray, Digital download
Pixar Short Films Collection, Volume 2	November 13, 2012	DVD, Blu-ray, Digital download
Toy Story of Terror!/Toy Story Toons	August 19, 2014	DVD, Blu-ray
Cars Toons: Bonus Disc	2013	DVD
The Radiator Springs 500½	2014	DVD
Pixar Short Films Collection, Volume 3	November 13, 2018	DVD, Blu-ray, Digital download

== Other work ==
Pixar made a series of shorts featuring Luxo Jr. for Sesame Street, which were Light & Heavy, Surprise, Up and Down, and Front and Back. Pixar also produced numerous animation tests, commonly confused with theatrical shorts, including Beach Chair and Flags and Waves. They also produced several commercials after selling their software division to support themselves until Toy Story became successful. Pixar continues to produce commercials related to their films.

Furthermore, in 1988, Apple's Advanced Technology Group produced "Pencil Test," a computer-animated short to showcase the Apple Macintosh II line. Although Pixar was not officially affiliated with this film, several members of the Pixar staff advised and worked on it, including directors John Lasseter, Andrew Stanton, and producer Galyn Susman. John Lasseter was credited as "Coach" in the credits of the film.

Some of their other work includes:

=== Animation tests ===
Title	Year
Blowin' in the Wind	1985
Beach Chair	1986
Flags and Waves	1986
Volume Visualization with the Pixar Image Computer	1987
Luxo Jr. 3D	1989

=== Commercials ===
Title	Year	Commissioned for
Dance of the Waterlilies	1989	Toppan Printing
Wake Up	1989	Tropicana
Babies	1990	Life Savers
Galaxy	1990	Toppan Printing
Dancing Cards	1990	California Lottery
Quite a Package	1990	Trident
La Nouvelle Polo	1990	Volkswagen
Pump	1990	Pillsbury
Boxer	1990	Listerine
Light & Heavy and Surprise	1991	Sesame Street
Cracks	1991	Fleischmann's
Moving Target	1991	Cellular One
Gummie Savers Conga-Clio-award winner	1991	Life Savers
Life At The Beach	1991	Life Savers
Orange Kiwi Passion	1991	Tropicana
Warehouse	1991	Tropicana
Three Fruits Dancing	1991	Tropicana
Grand Opening	1991	Toys "R" Us
Lunchbox	1991	Tetra Pak
Knight	1991	Listerine
Introduction	1991	Apple Mac Classic
Interview	1992	Volkswagen Polo
Swinging Bottle	1992	Listerine
Daydream	1992	Tetra Pak
Balloon	1992	Kellogg's All-Bran
Hourglass	1992	Kellogg's All-Bran
Chomp Chomp	1992	IncrediBites
Ladybug	1992	La Poste
In the Mood	1992	Bunn Coffee Makers
Cello	1993	Kellogg's All-Bran
Sprinkler	1993	Kellogg's All-Bran
Up and Down	1993	Sesame Street
Hungry	1993	Bank South
Chase	1993	Bank South
Stranded	1993	Tetra Pak
Bursting	1993	Carefree
Chuckling Straws	1993	Fresca
Launching Magic	1993	Jordan Magic Toothbrush
Ideas at Work	1993	Dow Corning
Arrows-Clio-award winner	1994	Listerine
Mission	1994	Listerine
Kaleidoscope	1994	Coca-Cola
About to Uncover	1994	Arm & Hammer
Here, There and Everywhere	1994	Arm & Hammer
Woman Getting What She Wants	1994	Levi's
We've Got Taste	1994	Nutri Grain
Wacky Frootz-Clio-award winner	1994	Life Savers
Fresh Salad	1994	Boston Chicken
Shaping Up Nicely	1994	Prime Option Credit Card
Strong Option	1994	Prime Option Credit Card
Front and Back	1994	Sesame Street
Balloon	1995	Chips Ahoy
Circus	1995	Chips Ahoy
Flamingo	1995	Ortho
Pinheads	1995	Dockers
Amazin' Straws	1995	Hershey's
Learning Lesson	1995	Coca-Cola
Secret Weapon	1995	Coca-Cola
Pin Box	1995	Coca-Cola
Toy Story video game commercial	1995	Disney Interactive
Art Store Break	1995	McDonald's
Christmas Conga	1995	Tower Records
Magic Desktop	1996	Sun Microsystems
Magnets-Clio-award winner	1996	Hallmark
Check Me Out	1996	Twizzlers
Let Me In	1996	Twizzlers
68th Academy Awards (Toy Story segment)	1996	Academy of Motion Picture Arts and Sciences
The Tastetations	1996	Hershey's
Toy Story CD-ROM – "Out of the Box"	1996	Disney Interactive
Wild Frijoles	1996	Rosarita
Shake It	1996	Levi's
Toy Story Treats	1996	ABC
Look Away	1997	Nickelodeon & UNICEF
A Bug's Life – "Belt Loop 1"	1998	McDonald's
A Bug's Life – "Belt Loop 2"	1998	McDonald's
A Bug's Life – "Big Toys"	1998	McDonald's
A Bug's Life – "Nothing Good on TV"	1998	McDonald's
A Bug's Life – "Nothing Good on TV Jr."	1998	McDonald's
A Bug's Life – "Ponkickies"	1999	Fuji Television
71st Academy Awards (A Bug's Life segment)	1999	Academy of Motion Picture Arts and Sciences
Toy Story 2 – "Up Periscope"	1999	McDonald's
Toy Story 2 – "Remote"	1999	McDonald's
Toy Story 2 – "Toys vs. Candy"	1999	McDonald's
Toy Story 2 – "Surveillance"	1999	McDonald's
Toy Story 2 Bumpers	1999	ABC
Toy Story 2	1999	Monday Night Football
Toy Story 2 – "Ponkickies"	1999	Fuji Television
72nd Academy Awards (Toy Story 2 segment)	2000	Academy of Motion Picture Arts and Sciences
Jessie's Acceptance Speech	2000	Cowgirl Hall of Fame
SIGGRAPH 2001 Opening Video (Buzz Lightyear sequence)	2001	SIGGRAPH
Monsters, Inc. Bumpers	2001	ABC
Monsters, Inc.	2001	Monday Night Football
Monsters, Inc. — "Happy Meal Toy"	2001	McDonald's
Monsters, Inc. — "Ponkickies"	2001	Fuji Television
Buzz Blasts	2002	Kellogg's
Disney Cereal — "CDs" (Buzz Lightyear sequence)	2002	Kellogg's
Finding Nemo — "Ponkickies"	2003	Fuji Television
Finding Nemo — "Schoolfish"	2003	ABC
Finding Nemo — "Laugh"	2003	McDonald's
The Incredibles — "Happy Meal Toys"	2004	McDonald's
The Incredibles — "SBC YAHOO!"	2004	Yahoo!
Vowellett – An Essay by Sarah Vowell	2005	The Incredibles two-disc collector's edition DVD set
Cars — "Happy Meal Toys"	2006	McDonald's
Cars — "State Farm"	2006	State Farm
Cars — "Walmart"	2006	Walmart
Cars — "Hertz"	2006	Hertz
Cars — "Opel Promotion 1"	2006	Opel
Cars — "Opel Promotion 2"	2006	Opel
Cars — "AT&T Yahoo Broadband"	2006	AT&T
Cars — "Energizer"	2006	Energizer
Wal-Mart Exclusive Cars DVD 2-pack Advertisement	2006	Wal-Mart
Ratatouille — "Nissan Note"	2007	Nissan
Disneyland Resort - "Toy Story Midway Mania!"	2008	Disneyland Resort
WALL-E - "Woody and Buzz Watching the Game"	2008	Super Bowl XLII
Up — "Aflac"	2009	Aflac
Toy Story 3	2010	USPS
Toy Story 3 — "Target"	2010	Target
Toy Story 3 — "Visa"	2010	Visa
Toy Story 3 — "Aflac"	2010	Aflac
Toy Story 3 - "Peugeot 5008"	2010	Peugeot
Toy Story 3 - "World Cup"	2010	2010 FIFA World Cup
Toy Story's Search Story	2010	Google
Toy Story The Third Dimension	2010	Dolby
Cars 2 — "Mom on a Mission"	2011	Target
Cars 2 — "State Farm"	2011	State Farm
Cars 2 — "V12 TV"	2011	V12 TV
Cars 2 — "RTS"	2011	Russian Traffic Safety
Cars 2 — "Profil Plus" / "Answer Seguros"	2011	Profil Plus
Publicité Oscaro Cars 2 pour l'émission Tout le sport	2011	Oscaro
Oscaro.com, partenaire de la saga Cars Oscaro	2011	Oscaro
Mater Sheds Some Lights at Cars Land	2012	Cars Land
Cars Land Opening Day	2012	Cars Land
Mater Bells	2012	Cars Land
Monsters University — "Mess"	2013	Swiffer
Toy Story of Terror! — "Sky"	2013	Sky UK
Toy Story That Time Forgot — "Sky"	2014	Sky UK
Buzz Lightyear Attacks Disneyland Resort	2015	Disneyland Resort
Inside Out — "Clorox"	2015	Clorox
Inside Out — "State Farm"	2015	State Farm
Inside Out — "Sky"	2015	Sky UK
Inside Out — "Lunch"	2015	Subway
88th Academy Awards (Woody and Buzz segment)	2016	Academy of Motion Picture Arts and Sciences
Finding Dory — "Coppertone"	2016	Coppertone
Finding Dory — "Hide and Seek"	2016	Band-Aid
Finding Dory — "Kellogg's"	2016	Kellogg's
Cars 3 — "Alamo Promo Ad"	2017	Alamo Rent a Car
Cars 3 — "Broken Part"	2017	Allianz
Cars 3 — "Die neue Allianz Autoversicherung"	2017	Allianz
Cars 3 — "Every Car Has a Personality"	2017	Autotrader.com
Cars 3 — "Sun Protection"	2017	Coppertone
Cars 3 — "Duracell Breaking News"	2017	Duracell
Cars 3 x Oscaro	2017	Oscaro
Incredibles 2 — "Sky"	2018	Sky UK
Incredibles 2 — "Happy Meal"	2018	McDonald's
Toy Story 4 — "Happy Meal"	2019	McDonald's
Toy Story 4 — "Dance Party"	2019	Chrysler Pacifica
Toy Story 4 — "Snack Attack"	2019	Babybel
Toy Story 4	2019	Seiban
Toy Story 4 2	2019	Seiban
Toy Story 4 — "Make Joy Happen"	2019	JD.com
Toy Story 4 AR	2019	Regal Cinemas
Pixar: 30 Years of Art & Animation	2019	Vivid Sydney
Halloween Time at the Disneyland Resort	2019	Disneyland Resort
Onward — "Happy Meal"	2020	McDonald's
Onward	2020	Whirlpool Corporation
Soul	2020	Allianz
Soul — "Happy Meal"	2020	McDonald's
Luca — "Happy Meal"	2021	McDonald's
Lightyear — "Happy Meal"	2022	McDonald's
Elemental — "Happy Meal"	2023	McDonald's
Inside Out 2 — "Happy Meal"	2024	McDonald's
Inside Out 2 — "Uber"	2024	Uber
Elio — "Happy Meal"	2025	McDonald's
Toy Story 5 - "Connecting Friends, Family and Toys"	2026	AT&T
Toy Story 5 - "Operation Pizza"	2026	Papa John's
Toy Story 5 - "Babybel"	2026	Babybel

The Pixar Co-op Program, a part of the Pixar University professional development program, allows their animators to use Pixar resources to produce independent films.

Some of their Co-op work includes:

=== Co-op Program ===
Title	Year	Director(s)	Premiered
The Dam Keeper	2014	Robert Kondo and Daisuke Tsutsumi	64th Berlin International Film Festival
Borrowed Time	2016	Andrew Coats and Lou Hamou-Lhadj	Austin Film Festival
Weekends	2017	Trevor Jimenez	Warsaw International Film Festival
Automaton	2020	Krzysztof Rost	SIGGRAPH
Pete	2022	Bret Parker	Tribeca Film Festival
Starling	2023	Mitra Shahidi	Tribeca Film Festival

=== Cancelled projects ===
==== Toy Story Toons: Mythic Rock ====
In 2013, it was revealed a fourth short of Toy Story Toons was in the works, entitled Mythic Rock. However, it was never released.

==== Cars Toons: Tales from Radiator Springs: To Protect and Serve ====
At the 2013 Disney D23 Expo, it was announced that a fifth episode of Cars Toons: Tales from Radiator Springs, entitled To Protect and Serve, was in production. However, it was never released.

== See also ==
- List of Pixar films
- List of Pixar television series
