= Tiny Toy Stories =

- VHS cover to Tiny Toy Stories
- Directed by: Alvy Ray Smith (The Adventures of André & Wally B.); John Lasseter (All other short films)
- Written by: John Lasseter
- Produced by: John Lasseter; William Reeves
- Starring: Jeff Bennett; Dee Bradley Baker; Pat Fraley; Jim Hanks; John Ratzenberger
- Music by: David Slusser; Brian Bennett (Luxo Jr. short film only, songs taken from BRD17 production music album); Bobby McFerrin (Knick Knack short film only)
- Production company: Pixar Animation Studios
- Distributed by: Walt Disney Home Video
- Release date: October 29, 1996
- Running time: 17 minutes (US version); 20 minutes (International version)
- Country: United States

Tiny Toy Stories is a home video compilation of the first five computer-animated short films made by Pixar. It was released on October 29, 1996, by Walt Disney Home Video and Disney Videos internationally. The international releases, including the UK and Japan, would feature segments featuring the Toy Story characters originally produced by the newly Disney-owned ABC that same year, known as Toy Story Treats, although they were redubbed so that the characters talk about the upcoming shorts instead. Additionally, the international releases have Knick Knack and Tin Toy switched, to exemplify how "without Tin Toy, there would've been no Toy Story".

== Shorts ==
All directed by John Lasseter except as noted:

- The Adventures of André & Wally B. (1984), directed by Alvy Ray Smith
- Luxo Jr. (1986) (original version)
- Red's Dream (1987)
- Tin Toy (1988)
- Knick Knack (1989) (original version)

== Cast ==
Note: These are the cast for Toy Story Treats.

- Jeff Bennett as Rex. The original segments would feature Wallace Shawn reprising his role.
- Dee Bradley Baker as the Aliens
- Pat Fraley as Buzz Lightyear
- Jim Hanks as Woody
- John Ratzenberger as Hamm. Ratzenberger is the only Toy Story voice actor to reprise his role for the international releases.
- Tyler Mullen

== Follow-ups ==
In November 2007, Walt Disney Studios Home Entertainment released Pixar Short Films Collection, Volume 1, which featured all of Pixar's animated short films up through 2006's Lifted. It also included The Adventures of André & Wally B. The second volume of shorts, Pixar Short Films Collection, Volume 2 was released in 2012. The third volume of shorts, Pixar Short Films Collection, Volume 3 was released in 2018.
