= Beach Chair (film test) =

1986 short computer animation by Eben Fiske Ostby

- Directed by: Eben Ostby
- Written by: Eben Ostby
- Produced by: Eben Ostby
- Production company: Pixar
- Release date: August 1986
- Running time: 30 seconds
- Country: United States
- Language: None

Beach Chair is a 30-second American short computer animation test clip created by animator Eben Ostby for Pixar in 1986. It depicts a chair walking across the sand, dipping its leg into the water, and then moving along. Ostby made the project with the feedback of John Lasseter to work out details of rendering software.

It was exhibited at SIGGRAPH in Dallas in 1986, along with Lasseter's landmark computer-animated short Luxo Jr. and another test project, Flags and Waves by Bill Reeves. Beach Chair can also be found as an Easter egg in Pixar Short Films Collection – Volume 1, which was released in 2007.

In 1991, it was shown on an episode of MTV's Liquid Television.

The test was lasting just approximately 30 seconds and it contains a background sound effects on, the short film would be followed by other computer animated short films also produced by Pixar.

== Plot ==
Beach Chair is a short about a chair on the beach watching the sea. The film has no dialogue, using only music and sound effects. The chair goes to the edge of the sea and it touches the water. It feels the water to be too cold, and turns away.
