= Flags and Waves =

- Directed by: Bill Reeves; Alain Fournier
- Written by: Bill Reeves; Alain Fournier
- Produced by: Bill Reeves; Alain Fournier
- Production company: Pixar
- Release date: August 1986
- Running time: 13 seconds
- Country: United States
- Language: None (Sound effects only)

Flags and Waves is a 13-second American short computer animation test clip which was created by animator Bill Reeves and Alain Fournier for Pixar sometime in 1986. The clip included waves reflecting a sunset and lapping against the shore. Reeves and Fournier made the project with the feedback of John Lasseter to work out details of rendering water and waves realistically, including lighting, motion, and shading.

It was first exhibited at SIGGRAPH in Dallas in August 1986, along with Lasseter's landmark computer-animated short Luxo Jr. and another test project Beach Chair, by Eben Ostby. The methods developed during the creation of this project were the basis of the water in Finding Nemo. It is based on an oceanographic model of ocean waves which Fournier dug out of the literature from the nineteenth century.

Flags and Waves can also be found as an easter egg in the Pixar Short Films Collection – Volume 1 which was released in November 2007.

== Content ==
The thirteen-second short begins with the title Flags and Waves and under it the title in French, Drapeaux et Vagues, superimposed on the SMPTE color bars while a high-pitch frequency sound is made. The bars are revealed to be a flag that is flapping in the wind, as the noise shifts to the sound of a calm beachside. The camera then pans up to show three more flags flapping in front of a beach as the bright sun appears to be setting.
