= David Salesin =

American computer scientist

- Born: Cleveland, OH, United States
- Education: Brown University; Stanford University
- Known for: Non-photorealistic rendering
- Awards: University of Washington Distinguished Teaching Award (1997); SIGGRAPH Computer Graphics Achievement Award (2000); ACM Fellow (2002)
- Scientific career
- Fields: Computer graphics
- Workplaces: Google; University of Washington
- Website: salesin.cs.washington.edu

David Salesin is an American computer scientist known for his work in computer graphics, three-dimensional and four-dimensional mathematics, and photorealistic rendering. Until 2019, he served as the director of Snap Inc. Research Team, an affiliate professor in the Department of Computer Science & Engineering of the University of Washington in Seattle, and previously director of the Adobe Creative Technologies Lab. He is currently a principal scientist at Google.

Salesin graduated from Brown University in 1983, and pursued graduate study at Stanford.

He received a National Young Investigator award from the National Science Foundation in 1993, and in 1995 was named a Presidential Faculty Fellow, receiving a National Science Foundation grant.

== Computer Animation Rendering ==
- André and Wally B. (1984) models: André/Wally
- Young Sherlock Holmes (1985) computer animation: Industrial Light & Magic
- Luxo Jr. (1986) rendering
- Tin Toy (1988) dynamics
- Toy Story (1995) renderman software development
