= Knick Knack =

1989 film directed by John Lasseter

- Poster for Knick Knack
- Directed by: John Lasseter
- Written by: John Lasseter
- Cinematography: Tony Apodaca; Don Conway
- Edited by: Craig Good
- Music by: Bobby McFerrin
- Production company: Pixar Animation Studios
- Distributed by: Direct Cinema
- Release dates: September 1, 1989 (SIGGRAPH); May 30, 2003 (with Finding Nemo); October 20, 2006 (with The Nightmare Before Christmas 3D)
- Running time: 4 minutes
- Country: United States
- Language: None

Knick Knack is a 1989 American animated short film produced by Pixar that was written and directed by John Lasseter. The short is about a snow globe snowman who wants to join the other travel souvenirs in a summer-themed party. However, the glass dome that surrounds him prevents him from doing so, thus leading to his many tries to break out of his snow globe. Knick Knack is Pixar's fourth short and the final short produced during the company's tenure as a hardware company. It was also the final Pixar short film released before the company's first feature-length film Toy Story.

The short stands out from Lasseter's other early short films at Pixar in its reliance on pure comedy to drive the story. It was inspired by Tom and Jerry, Looney Tunes, and the work of animators Chuck Jones and Tex Avery. Lasseter and his wife, Nancy, collected snow globes and also enjoyed souvenirs from distant places and those elements made their way into the short as well. Singer Bobby McFerrin improvised the a cappella vocal jazz soundtrack to the film while watching a rough cut which was eventually left unchanged in its final edition.

Knick Knack debuted at the 1989 SIGGRAPH convention in Boston, Massachusetts and was presented in 3D. The short has enjoyed positive reviews since its debut and has been screened as a part of numerous film festivals. The short has now been associated with Finding Nemo, with a remastered version of the short being shown before it in that film's original theatrical run.

== Plot ==
On a bookshelf filled with vacation-themed souvenirs, a lonely and grumpy knick-knack snowman named Knick, who resides in a "Nome Sweet Nome, Alaska" snow globe, wants to reach a female "Sunny Miami" knick-knack that shows an attractive blonde and tanned pool-lounger, wearing a blue bikini and sunglasses. Knick tries several unsuccessful methods to break out of the globe: ramming the glass with the snow globe's igloo backdrop, using his carrot nose and a hammer to chisel through the glass, using a jackhammer (which causes his facial features to fall off), trying to cut the glass using a blowtorch and an igniter, and detonating TNT explosives. The latter causes the globe to fall over the edge. Knick notices an emergency exit in the base and frees himself just before he and the globe fall into a fishbowl, where Knick sees a mermaid souvenir from "Sunny Atlantis" identical to the Miami souvenir and starts gawking at her, only for the globe to settle to the bottom and trap him again, much to his annoyance.

== Background ==
In 1988, Pixar's third short film, Tin Toy, won the Academy Award for Best Animated Short Film, the first computer-animated film to claim the Academy Award. It was also the first win for the hardware company, which was still struggling to sell its main product: the Pixar Image Computer. The key animator and director behind Tin Toy, John Lasseter, had once worked at Disney several years prior but was fired by unknowingly stepping on his superiors' toes with his support for computer animation. Now, Disney took notice of the Oscar win for Tin Toy and began a campaign to win Lasseter back.

Lasseter turned the studio's offer for a directorial position down, remarking to Pixar co-founder Ed Catmull, "I can go to Disney and be a director, or I can stay here and make history." Jeffrey Katzenberg, the then-head of Walt Disney Studios, had a reputation for being difficult and controlling. In contrast, Lasseter received complete creative freedom at Pixar's small animation division and was highly respected by his colleagues. In addition to capturing Disney's interest, Pixar owner Steve Jobs' interest in the animation group was invigorated, and he approved production of another short.

== Production ==
After the headaches of animating Billy the baby in Tin Toy, Lasseter backed away from depicting human characters. The team all agreed to do something simpler that would not "drive us all crazy," according to producer Ralph Guggenheim. When watching Who Framed Roger Rabbit during the production of Tin Toy, Lasseter became inspired to create a Chuck Jones-type of cartoon. Rather than challenge the limitations of the computer as they had done in the previous shorts, the animators wanted to make a short based on geometric shapes instead, which was a strength of the computer. In a discussion with the group, Lasseter brought up famed Warner Bros. and MGM director Tex Avery, noting that his cartoons were wild and exuberant, yet not necessarily very complex. Lasseter collected snow globes and also enjoyed souvenirs from distant places; from those elements, Knick Knack—the only pure comedy among Lasseter's early short films at Pixar—began to fall into place.

The rest of the team were also fans of Tom and Jerry cartoons and the work of Chuck Jones and found the idea of cartoonish violence appealing. Animator Flip Phillips and production coordinator Deirdre Warin simultaneously hit on the idea of the snow globe falling into a fishbowl. Craig Good came up with the idea of an "iris out," a shrinking circle at the close, as a reference to Looney Tunes. A skeleton on the shelf in the short was a 3D model from an Ohio State University skeleton data set called George, though the Pixar team stretched George's arms for comic effect. Also distorted were the two female characters—the bikini-attired woman and a mermaid—whose breasts were ultra-exaggerated thanks to a technical director who was a pinup enthusiast.

The singer Bobby McFerrin created the musical soundtrack and a cappella vocal jazz track which he improvised while watching a rough cut of the film. As the rough cut ended, the placeholder credits read blah-blah-blah-blah, so he sang those words and it remained in the film's score. McFerrin did the score for free out of a belief that the film was cool to be involved with. Gary Rydstrom of Lucasfilm created the sound effects for the short.

== Release and re-releases ==
Knick Knack debuted at the 1989 SIGGRAPH in Boston. It was one of the last pieces of animation that Lasseter would animate personally during Pixar's years as an independent company. In 1990, it won the Best Short Film award at the Seattle International Film Festival. When Lasseter presented it at the London Film Festival in 1991, The Independent of London called it "a four-minute masterpiece" and The Guardian hailed Lasseter as "probably the closest thing to God that has ever graced the electronic images community." In 2001, Terry Gilliam selected it as one of the ten best animated films of all time. After Knick Knack, Pixar took a break from animated shorts and re-focused on animating television commercials to build income and hire new animators.

The film has been released in two versions, and each of these has been shown in both 3-D and 2-D. The original version was shown in 3-D in 1989 at the SIGGRAPH program, and was released on the VHS and LaserDisc, Tiny Toy Stories, and also on the Toy Story Deluxe CAV LaserDisc. The short was later released on May 30, 2003, in theaters with Finding Nemo. For this release, the film was re-rendered with design adjustments for the woman on the "Miami" knick-knack and the mermaid in the fishbowl. Both characters now have much smaller breasts and the mermaid is now wearing a seashell bra rather than just starfish pasties. Lasseter defended the changes by saying, "It wasn't big bad Disney coming in and insisting we do this … it was our own choice. It was just crossing the line for me personally as a father. So I decided to reduce [these characters'] breast size."

This updated version is preceded with the message "In 1989, six years before Toy Story, Pixar Animation Studios made this short film." This version was first made available with the Finding Nemo DVD & VHS. This version is subsequently on Nemo's Blu-ray, the Pixar Short Films Collection – Volume 1 DVD and Blu-ray, and on digital services that feature Pixar's shorts including Disney+. A 3-D version of the new edition played to the public as a short attached to the 2006 Disney Digital 3-D release of The Nightmare Before Christmas.

== References to Knick Knack in other media ==
In the Toy Story franchise, a book titled Knick Knack is often seen on a bookshelf along with other books named after Pixar shorts. Knick and his snow globe appear in Toy Story That Time Forgot.

Clips from the short can be seen on the TV when Hamm is flickering through the channels in Toy Story 2.

Sunny Atlantis is seen on the shipwreck in the dentist's fish tank in Finding Nemo.

Knick is seen in the snowglobe in Lizzie's Curios Shop in Cars.

Sunny Miami appears on a passport in Up when Carl buys plane tickets.

Knick's snow globe appears in the antique store in Toy Story 4. Additionally, Knick Knack is referenced along with other Pixar shorts such as Lifted, Red's Dream and Lava on a stack of Super 8 film reels seen alongside a film projector on top of one of the shelves inside the store.

During 2007–2008, a series of commercials released in the United Kingdom for Bupa featured the Knick Knack theme tune as their soundtrack.

A store at Pixar Pier at Disney California Adventure references this short film. The name of the store is Knick's Knacks. The sign at the front of the store displays Knick the snowman in his snow globe.
