= Eben Fiske Ostby =

American animator (born 1955)

- Born: February 24, 1955 (age 71); Hampton, Connecticut, U.S.
- Other name: Eben Ostby
- Occupation: Technical Director
- Awards: 1998 Scientific and Engineering Award

Eben Fiske Ostby (born February 24, 1955) is a pioneer computer graphics software developer, animator, and technical director for motion pictures.

Ostby was born in Hampton, Connecticut, United States. He graduated from Pomfret School and Vassar College, where he was its "first computer science major". He joined Pixar when the company was a garage start-up, as one of the first four employees of its animation department along with John Lasseter. There, he worked on early breakthrough animation shorts such as Luxo Jr., Red's Dream, Tin Toy, Knick Knack, and For the Birds. He became Vice President for Software. In 1998, he shared the Academy Award, Scientific and Engineering with three other people for the development of the Marionette 3-D Computer Animation System. He has served as Computer Animation, Technical and Modeling Director on Cars 2005, A Bug's Life, Monsters, Inc., Toy Story, Toy Story 2, Young Sherlock Holmes and many other motion pictures.

== Computer animation ==
- André and Wally B. (1984) 3-D animation programmer
- Young Sherlock Holmes (1985) computer animation: Industrial Light & Magic
- Luxo, Jr. (1986) animation software/modeler/rendering
- Red's Dream (1987) modeling and animation software/models/technical director
- Tin Toy (1988) additional animator/modeler/technical director
- Knick Knack (1989) animator/technical director
- Toy Story (1995) modeling and animation system development/associate technical director
- A Bug's Life (1998) supervising technical director
- Toy Story 2 (1999) modeling supervisor
- For the Birds (2000) modeling supervisor
- Monsters, Inc. (2001) modeling supervisor
- Cars (2006) supervising technical director
- Up (2009) senior technology team: Pixar
- Brave (2012) senior technology team: Pixar
- Monsters University (2013) film production resources: Pixar Studio Team
- Inside Out (2015) production senior manager: Pixar
- Piper (2016) special thanks
- Coco (2017) production department head: Pixar
- Incredibles 2 (2018) production department head: Pixar
- Bao (2018) special thanks
- Purl (2018) special thanks
- Smash and Grab (2019) special thanks
- Kitbull (2019) special thanks
