= Gary Rydstrom =

American sound designer and director (born 1959)

- Born: Gary Roger Rydstrom; June 29, 1959 (age 67); Chicago, Illinois, U.S.
- Occupations: Sound designer Re-recording mixer Supervising sound editor Film director
- Years active: 1984–present

Gary Roger Rydstrom (born June 29, 1959) is an American sound designer and film director. He has been nominated for twenty Academy Awards for his work in sound for movies, and has won seven times.

== Life and career ==
Rydstrom was born in Chicago, raised in Elmhurst, Illinois where he attended public school K-12, graduating in 1977 from York High School. He graduated from the University of Southern California School of Cinematic Arts in 1981. He began his career at Skywalker Sound in Northern California in 1983, having been offered the job by a college professor, which enabled him to work with his mentor, Star Wars sound designer Ben Burtt.

After gaining invaluable experience as a sound technician in Indiana Jones and the Temple of Doom, Rydstrom went on to do sound design for the comedy Spaceballs. The sound design for Backdraft was created from scratch and later served as the foundation for his work on Terminator 2: Judgment Day. The original sound effects from Backdraft are constantly referenced and have been used for numerous other films including The Lord of the Rings film trilogy and Shrek.

He won an Academy Award for his work on Terminator 2: Judgment Day, for which he pioneered techniques still used today for creating realistic sound effects. Rydstrom also collaborated with Terminator 2 director James Cameron on a new 5.1 surround sound remix for the original Terminator.

His sound work on Jurassic Park led to further innovations, as he and his team set out to create dinosaur sounds by mixing together numerous different animal vocalizations to make the audience feel as though giant bellowing prehistoric beasts surrounded them. The Academy Award-winning film was the first motion picture to be presented in DTS. The T-Rex roar created by Gary was later re-used for Dim in A Bug's Life, Thanator in Avatar and the Hydra in Percy Jackson and the Lightning Thief.

He subsequently went on to work on sound for numerous films including Titanic, Saving Private Ryan, Minority Report and Finding Nemo. He won an MPSE lifetime achievement award, and regularly speaks at various sound design forums sharing his extensive knowledge and enthusiasm with aspiring sound design artists.

He made his directorial debut with the Pixar short Lifted, earning his fourteenth Academy Award nomination. It was included in the Animation Show of Shows in 2006. His debut feature film, Newt, a story about two blue-footed newts learning to cooperate, was announced in 2008 and reportedly entered early production but was ultimately cancelled by Pixar in early 2010 due to story issues. He also directed the Pixar short Hawaiian Vacation and the Lucasfilm animated feature Strange Magic.

Rydstrom has also served as English language director on Tales From Earthsea, Arrietty, From Up on Poppy Hill, and The Wind Rises, all of which were produced by the Japanese animation company Studio Ghibli.

== Awards and nominations ==
Rydstrom has been nominated for 20 Academy Awards (7 wins), 12 Golden Reel Awards (5 wins), 5 C.A.S Awards (2 wins), 5 BAFTA Awards (2 wins), and 1 Grammy (1 win).

Academy Awards

- 2022: West Side Story (Best Sound) - Nominated
- 2020: Ad Astra (Best Sound Mixing) - Nominated
- 2016: Bridge of Spies (Best Sound Mixing) - Nominated
- 2013: Lincoln (Best Sound Mixing) - Nominated
- 2012: War Horse (Best Sound Mixing) - Nominated
- 2012: War Horse (Best Sound Editing) - Nominated
- 2007: Lifted (Best Animated Short Film) - Nominated
- 2004: Finding Nemo (Best Sound Editing) - Nominated
- 2003: Minority Report (Best Sound Editing) - Nominated
- 2002: Monsters, Inc. (Best Sound Editing) - Nominated
- 2000: Star Wars: Episode I – The Phantom Menace (Best Sound Mixing) - Nominated
- 1999: Saving Private Ryan (Best Sound Effects Editing) - Won
- 1999: Saving Private Ryan (Best Sound) - Won
- 1998: Titanic (Best Sound) - Won
- 1994: Jurassic Park (Best Sound Effects Editing) - Won
- 1994: Jurassic Park (Best Sound) - Won
- 1992: Terminator 2: Judgment Day (Best Sound Effects Editing) - Won
- 1992: Terminator 2: Judgment Day (Best Sound) - Won
- 1992: Backdraft (Best Sound Effects Editing) - Nominated
- 1992: Backdraft (Best Sound) - Nominated

Motion Picture Sound Editors - Golden Reel Award

- 2005: - Career Achievement Award
- 2004: Finding Nemo (Best Sound Editing in Feature Film - Animated - Sound) - Nominated
- 2003: Minority Report (Best Sound Editing in Domestic Features - Dialogue & ADR) - Nominated
- 2003: Minority Report (Best Sound Editing in Domestic Features - Sound Effects & Foley) - Nominated
- 2002: Atlantis: The Lost Empire (Best Sound Editing - Animated Feature Film, Domestic and Foreign) - Won
- 2002: Monsters, Inc. (Best Sound Editing - Animated Feature Film, Domestic and Foreign) - Nominated
- 2002: Artificial Intelligence: AI (Best Sound Editing - Dialogue & ADR, Domestic Feature Film) - Nominated
- 2002: Artificial Intelligence: AI (Best Sound Editing - Effects & Foley, Domestic Feature Film) - Nominated
- 2001: Into the Arms of Strangers: Stories of the Kindertransport (Best Sound Editing - Dialogue & ADR, Domestic Feature Film) - Nominated
- 1999: A Bug's Life (Best Sound Editing - Animated Feature) - Won
- 1999: Saving Private Ryan (Best Sound Editing - Dialogue & ADR) - Won
- 1999: Saving Private Ryan (Best Sound Editing - Sound Effects & Foley) - Won
- 1998: Hercules (Best Sound Editing - Animated Feature) - Won

Cinema Audio Society - C.A.S Award

- 2004: - Career Achievement Award
- 2000: Star Wars: Episode I - The Phantom Menace (Outstanding Achievement in Sound Mixing for a Feature Film) - Nominated
- 1999: Saving Private Ryan (Outstanding Achievement in Sound Mixing for a Feature Film) - Won
- 1998: Titanic (Outstanding Achievement in Sound Mixing for a Feature Film) - Won
- 1994: Jurassic Park (Outstanding Achievement in Sound Mixing for a Feature Film) - Nominated

BAFTA Award

- 2000: Star Wars: Episode I - The Phantom Menace (Best Sound) - Nominated
- 1999: Saving Private Ryan (Best Sound) - Won
- 1998: Titanic (Best Sound) - Nominated
- 1994: Jurassic Park (Best Sound) - Nominated
- 1992: Terminator 2: Judgment Day (Best Sound) - Won

Grammy Award

- 2023: Bates: Philharmonia Fantastique - The Making of the Orchestra (Grammy Award for Best Engineered Album, Classical) - Won

== Filmography ==
- Indiana Jones and the Temple of Doom (1984) audio technician
- Ewoks: The Battle for Endor (1985) audio technician
- Remo Williams: The Adventure Begins (1985) foley artist
- Luxo Jr. (1986) sound designer
- Red's Dream (1987) sound designer
- Spaceballs (1987) sound designer
- Captain EO (1987) sound designer
- Colors (1988) sound designer
- Tin Toy (1988) sound designer
- Willow (1988) foley artist
- Always (1989) re-recording mixer
- Knick Knack (1989) sound designer
- The Neon Empire (1989) re-recording mixer
- Mars Navigator (1990) sound designer/re-recording mixer (interactive video)
- F/X2: The Deadly Art Of Illusion (1991) sound designer/re-recording mixer
- Backdraft (1991) sound designer/re-recording mixer/supervising sound editor
- Terminator 2: Judgment Day (1991) sound designer/re-recording mixer/supervising sound editor
- Single White Female (1992) sound designer/re-recording mixer
- Mrs. Doubtfire (1993) sound designer/re-recording mixer/supervising sound editor
- Jurassic Park (1993) sound designer/re-recording mixer/supervising sound editor
- Baby's Day Out (1994) sound designer/re-recording mixer/supervising sound editor
- Casper (1995) sound designer/re-recording mixer/supervising sound editor
- Strange Days (1995) sound designer/re-recording mixer/supervising sound editor
- Toy Story (1995) sound designer/re-recording mixer/supervising sound editor
- Jumanji (1995) sound designer/supervising sound editor
- Mission: Impossible (1996) re-recording mixer
- The Lost World: Jurassic Park (1997) sound designer/re-recording mixer/supervising sound editor
- Hercules (1997) sound designer
- Titanic (1997) re-recording mixer
- Saving Private Ryan (1998) sound designer/re-recording mixer/supervising sound editor
- A Bug's Life (1998) sound designer/re-recording mixer/supervising sound editor
- Star Wars: Episode I – The Phantom Menace (1999) re-recording mixer
- Toy Story 2 (1999) sound designer/re-recording mixer/supervising sound editor
- The Haunting (1999) sound designer/re-recording mixer/supervising sound editor
- The Terminator (1984, 2000s DVD release) sound designer consultant: sound restoration and re-mixing
- The Legend of Bagger Vance (2000) sound designer/re-recording mixer/supervising sound editor
- A.I. Artificial Intelligence (2001) sound designer/re-recording mixer/supervising sound editor
- Atlantis: The Lost Empire (2001) sound designer/re-recording mixer
- Monsters, Inc. (2001) sound designer/re-recording mixer/supervising sound editor
- Star Wars: Episode II – Attack of the Clones (2002) re-recording mixer
- Minority Report (2002) sound designer/re-recording mixer/supervising sound editor
- Punch-Drunk Love (2002) sound designer/re-recording mixer/supervising sound editor
- Finding Nemo (2003) sound designer/re-recording mixer/supervising sound editor
- Hulk (2003) sound designer/re-recording mixer/supervising sound editor
- Peter Pan (2003) sound designer/re-recording mixer/supervising sound editor
- Starship Troopers 2: Hero of the Federation (2004) special thanks
- Lifted (2006) director/writer/sound
- Tales from Earthsea (2010) director/ADR director (English-language version)
- Toy Story Toons: Hawaiian Vacation (2011) director, screenplay
- Bully (2011) sound designer
- Super 8 (2011) additional sound designer
- The Adventures of Tintin (2011) sound designer consultant
- Mission: Impossible – Ghost Protocol (2011) sound designer/re-recording mixer/supervising sound editor
- War Horse (2011) sound designer/re-recording mixer/supervising sound editor
- Lincoln (2012) re-recording mixer
- The Secret World of Arrietty (2012) director (American English-language version)
- Brave (2012) sound designer/re-recording mixer/supervising sound editor
- Wreck-it Ralph (2012) sound designer/supervising sound editor
- The Lone Ranger (2013) sound designer/supervising sound editor
- From Up on Poppy Hill (2013) director (English-language version)
- The Wind Rises (2014) director (English-language version)
- The Face of Love (2014) sound design consultant
- Strange Magic (2015) director, screenplay
- Tomorrowland (2015) re-recording mixer
- Jurassic World (2015) sound designer consultant
- Bridge of Spies (2015) re-recording mixer
- Star Wars: The Force Awakens (2015) re-recording mixer
- The BFG (2016) re-recording mixer
- The Post (2017) sound designer/re-recording mixer
- Ready Player One (2018) sound designer/re-recording mixer/supervising sound editor
- Ralph Breaks the Internet (2018) sound designer/supervising sound editor
- Jurassic World: Fallen Kingdom (2018) sound designer consultant
- Ad Astra (2019) sound designer/re-recording mixer/supervising sound editor
- Come Away (2020) re-recording mixer
- West Side Story (2021) sound designer/re-recording mixer/supervising sound editor
- Luck (2022) sound design consultant
- Top Gun: Maverick (2022) sound design consultant
- The Fabelmans (2022) sound designer/re-recording mixer/supervising sound editor
- Once Upon a Studio (2023) sound design consultant (uncredited)
