= The Adventures of André & Wally B. =

1984 animated short film by Alvy Ray Smith

- Official release poster
- Directed by: Alvy Ray Smith
- Written by: Alvy Ray Smith (concept)
- Produced by: John Lasseter; Ed Catmull (uncredited); Alvy Ray Smith (uncredited)
- Cinematography: John Lasseter
- Edited by: Craig Good
- Production company: Lucasfilm Computer Graphics Project
- Distributed by: Lucasfilm
- Release dates: July 25, 1984 (Original SIGGRAPH debut, unfinished); August 17, 1984 (Toronto International Animation Festival, completed); November 22, 1995 (with Toy Story in select theaters)
- Running time: 2 minutes
- Country: United States
- Language: None

The Adventures of André & Wally B. (or simply André & Wally B.) is a 1984 American animated short film produced by the Lucasfilm Computer Graphics Project, a division of Lucasfilm and the predecessor of Pixar. The short was groundbreaking by the standards of the time and helped spark the film industry's interest in computer animation.

The animation in the film was by John Lasseter and was his first computer-animated project with Lucasfilm. Partially as a result of the success of this project, and others that followed, Lasseter became an executive at Pixar. The film was released on July 25, 1984, at SIGGRAPH in Minneapolis, Minnesota.

== Plot ==
The short involves an android named André awakening in a forest and being confronted by a pesky bumblebee named Wally B. André tricks the bee into turning his back so that he can run away. Angry, Wally B. pursues André and eventually catches up with him, and strikes with the stinger. A collision occurs off-screen and a dizzy Wally B. reappears with a damaged stinger. Shortly, Wally B. gets hit by André's tossed hat as a last laugh for revenge.

== Production ==
The credits for the piece are: concept/direction Alvy Ray Smith, animation John Lasseter, technical lead Bill Reeves, technical contributions by Tom Duff (who designed the animation program called "md", short for "motion doctor"), Eben Ostby, Rob Cook, Loren Carpenter, Ed Catmull, David Salesin, Tom Porter, and Sam Leffler, filming by David DiFrancesco, Tom Noggle, and Don Conway, and computer logistics by Craig Good.

The title is a tribute to the 1981 film My Dinner with Andre, starring André Gregory and Wallace Shawn, the latter of which went on to voice Rex for the Toy Story franchise. It was originally entitled My Breakfast with André, about waking up with an android. The android's awakening was meant to symbolize the rise of computer animation itself.

The animation on the short was groundbreaking, featuring the first use of motion blur in CGI animation and complex 3D backgrounds, where the lighting styles and colors were inspired by Maxfield Parrish, made using particle systems. Because CGI models back then were restricted to rigid geometric shapes, Smith wrote André as a robot. But Lasseter realized it was possible to make a more cartoony and soft-looking character despite these limitations, as Ub Iwerks' design of Mickey Mouse was also made almost entirely of geometric forms. After finishing André's design, Lasseter was dissatisfied with how hard it was to make his character express emotions and attitude through his posture, and pushed the envelope by asking for manipulatable shapes capable of the squash and stretch style. It was rendered on a Cray X-MP/2 and a Cray X-MP/4 supercomputer at Cray Research's computer center in Mendota Heights, Minnesota, ten VAX-11/750 superminicomputers at Project Athena at MIT, and one VAX-11/780, and three VAX-11/750 computers at Lucasfilm. These machines were often available only at night, and much of the movie was therefore made "in the wee hours". Cray Research allowed them to use their computer in hopes Lucasfilm would buy a machine. The film's soundtrack was partially produced by SoundDroid.

== Release ==
The short debuted on July 25, 1984, in Minneapolis at the annual SIGGRAPH conference, though 2 shots or about 6 seconds of the film were incomplete and made of wire-frame renders, so-called pencil test footage, over the completed backgrounds. This was because there was no time to fully render the short film. The final rendering of the film was released a month later, on August 17 at Toronto's International Animation Festival. The film was also showcased at "Digicon '85".

The film was broadcast as part of YTV's Short Circutz series.

== Home media ==
The short was released for home video in the collections State of the Art of Computer Animation, Imaginaria, Tiny Toy Stories, and Pixar Short Films Collection, Volume 1.

== See also ==
- List of Pixar shorts
