= Starling (film) =

2023 American animated short film

- Directed by: Mitra Shahidi
- Written by: Mitra Shahidi
- Produced by: Jessica Heidt
- Production companies: Mona Productions; Pixar Animation Studios
- Release date: June 10, 2023 (Tribeca Festival)
- Running time: 9 minutes
- Country: United States

Starling is a 2023 animated short film about grief and loss directed by Mitra Shahidi. The short premiered at the Tribeca Festival, where it won an award for Best Animated Short. Starling has since been selected for screening in various international film festivals including the HollyShorts Film Festival, the Pixelatl Festival and the Richmond International Film Festival.

== Plot ==
The spirit star of a little girl travels through the sky to celebrate her birthday with her family, who is mourning her, but is blown off course and must travel through Istanbul to reach her home. Whilst exploring the sounds & smells of city, she realises that she is losing her life force, and must act quickly. Finally at her house, with very little force left, she is faced with an impossible decision.

== Production ==
Starling was made over the course of 4 years with a crew that spanned 14 countries, including Turkey, Spain, the United Kingdom, India, Brazil and France. It was produced through Pixar Animation's co-op program, which allows employees to use company equipment for personal projects. Primarily animated using traditional 2D techniques, Starling also used Blender to create and animate specific 3D elements.

== Release ==
Starling had its world premiere at the Tribeca Festival on June 10, 2023.

== Reception ==
Since its release, the film has been selected in various festivals around the world:

Year	Festivals	Award/Category	Status
2023	Tribeca Festival	Best Animated Short	Won
2023	Holly Shorts Film Festival	Best Animation	Nominated
2023	Mill Valley Film Festival	Best Short Film	Nominated
2023	Hamptons International Film Festival	Best Short Film	Nominated
2023	Austin Film Festival	Best Animated Short	Nominated
2023	Austin Film Festival	Best Animated Short (Audience Award)	Won
2023	AFI Fest	Best Short Film	Nominated
