= William Reeves (animator) =

Canadian animator and technical director

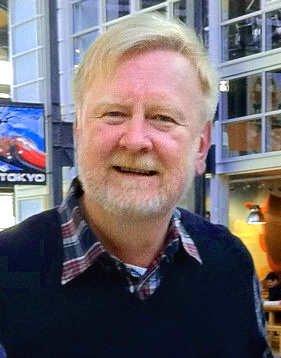
- Reeves in December 2011 at the Pixar campus
- Born: May 5, 1959 (age 67); Toronto, Ontario, Canada
- Occupations: Supervising technical director; modeling; animation system development; RenderMan software development
- Employer(s): Pixar Animation Studios; Industrial Light & Magic
- Spouse: Ricki Blau
- Children: Julia, Oliver, & Ian Reeves
- Awards: 1987 – Nominated: Academy Award for Animated Short Film; Luxo, Jr. 1988 – Won: Academy Award for Animated Short Film; Tin Toy; 1997 – Won: Scientific and Engineering Award; For the original concept and the development of particle systems used to create computer generated visual effects in motion pictures. 1998 – Won: Scientific and Engineering Award; For the development of the Marionette Three-Dimensional Computer Animation System. 2018 – Won: SIGGRAPH Practitioner Award; For outstanding contributions to the practice and advancement of Computer Graphics and Interactive Techniques.

William "Bill" Reeves (born May 5, 1959) is a Canadian animator and technical director known for working with John Lasseter on the animated shorts Luxo Jr. and The Adventures of André and Wally B.

After obtaining a Bachelor of Mathematics from the University of Waterloo and completing a Ph.D. at the University of Toronto, Reeves was hired by George Lucas as a member of Lucasfilm's Computer Division, Computer Graphics Group. He was one of the founding employees of Pixar when it was sold in 1986 to Steve Jobs. Reeves is the inventor of the first motion blur algorithm and methods to simulate particle motion in CGI. Bill Reeves created particle systems allowing for the realistic articulation of random elements like smoke and fire.

Lasseter and Reeves received the Academy Award for Best Animated Short Film (Academy Award) in 1988 for their work on the film Tin Toy, the first completely CGI-animated film to ever win an Academy Award. Their collaboration continued with Reeves acting as the supervising technical director of the first feature-length, computer-animated film: Toy Story.

In 1996 he became the 2nd awardee of the J.W. Graham Medal, named in honor of Wes Graham an early influential professor of computer science at the University of Waterloo, and annually awarded to an influential alumnus of the University's faculty of mathematics.

In 2018, Reeves was the first recipient of the new annual SIGGRAPH Practitioner Award, which recognizes outstanding contributions to the practice and advancement of Computer Graphics and Interactive Techniques.

== Filmography ==
- Star Trek II: The Wrath of Khan (1982) (computer graphics artist: Industrial Light & Magic)
- Return of the Jedi (1983) (computer graphics: Industrial Light & Magic)
- The Adventures of André and Wally B. (1984) (forest design and rendering/models: Andre/Wally)
- Young Sherlock Holmes (1985) (computer animation: Industrial Light & Magic)
- Luxo Jr. (1986) (producer/modeling/rendering)
- Red's Dream (1987) (technical director/modeling and animation software)
- Tin Toy (1988) (producer/technical director/modeler/additional animator)
- Knick Knack (1989) (animator)
- Toy Story (1995) (supervising technical director/modeling/animation system development/RenderMan software development)
- A Bug's Life (1998) (supervising technical director)
- Finding Nemo (2003) (lead technical development)
- The Incredibles (2004) (technical development)
- Ratatouille (2007) (global technology supervisor)
- Up (2009) (global technology engineer)
- Toy Story 3 (2010) (global technology supervisor)
- Monsters University (2013) (global illumination)
- Inside Out (2015) (second unit and crowds supervisor/global technology supervisor)
- Cars 3 (2017) (global technology engineer)
- Coco (2017) (global technology engineer)
- Toy Story 4 (2019) (technology and pipeline supervisor)
- Elemental (2023) (global technology & dailies supervisor)
- Toy Story 5 (2026) (global technology supervisor)

== See also ==
- List of University of Waterloo people
