= Red's Dream =

1987 short film by John Lasseter

- Poster for Red's Dream
- Directed by: John Lasseter
- Written by: John Lasseter
- Cinematography: Don Conway
- Edited by: Craig Good
- Music by: David Slusser
- Production company: Pixar Animation Studios
- Distributed by: Direct Cinema
- Release date: July 10, 1987
- Running time: 4 minutes
- Country: United States
- Language: None

Red's Dream is a 1987 American animated short film written and directed by John Lasseter and produced by Pixar. The short film, which runs four minutes, stars Red, a unicycle. Propped up in the corner of a bicycle store on a rainy night, Red dreams of a fantasy where it becomes the star of a circus. Red's Dream was Pixar's second computer-animated short following Luxo Jr. in 1986, also directed by Lasseter.

Red's Dream is more strongly character-driven than Luxo Jr., Pixar's previous short film. The short was designed to demonstrate new technical innovations in imagery. The short was created by employing the company's own Pixar Image Computer, but the computer's memory limitations led the animation group to abandon it for further projects. Space was growing tight at the company, and as a result, Lasseter and his team worked out of a hallway during production, where Lasseter sometimes slept for days on end.

The short film debuted at the annual SIGGRAPH conference in Anaheim, California on July 10, 1987, and received general enthusiasm from its attendants. Red's Dream was never attached to any later Pixar feature, unlike many other early Pixar short films. It later saw release for home video as part of Tiny Toy Stories in 1996 and Pixar Short Films Collection, Volume 1 in 2007.

== Plot ==
On a rainy night in an unnamed, deserted city where no one can be seen, a red unicycle named Red is lying in the clearance corner of a bicycle shop called "Eben's Bikes". Red dreams of being the center of a circus act, which is represented within a dream sequence in which Red is ridden by a circus clown revealed to be Lumpy. After cycling onstage to little fanfare, Lumpy begins a juggling act with three colored balls, which he continually drops by accident, prompting the unicycle to roll out from underneath him and catch them. Eventually, Lumpy accidentally launches one of the balls out of the ring, prompting Red to go out and retrieve it without his notice. After realizing that his unicycle is out from beneath his feet, Lumpy falls and vanishes from the dream, after which Red catches the other two balls and juggles them to an uproarious applause; however, the dream ends, and Red awakens after bowing to the audience, realizing that it is still in the bike shop. Depressed, it returns to the corner where it was previously resting and becomes inanimate again, awaiting its fate.

== Production ==
Red's Dream was the second short film produced by computer animation studio Pixar, following Luxo Jr., the studio's previous short film. For their next short film, which was to be presented at the 1987 SIGGRAPH convention, Ed Catmull wanted the Pixar staff to make a film that made use of the Pixar Image Computer and the rendering software Chapreyes. Lasseter began to develop a story about a circus clown who is upstaged by his own unicycle, while William Reeves and Eben Ostby were simultaneously working on their own ideas; Ostby had wanted to animate a bicycle, and Reeves was working on creating a rainy setting in a city. Ultimately, the three combined their ideas, which resulted in the development of Red's Dream. The idea of a bicycle shop for a setting was inspired by Ostby, a cycling enthusiast and graphics programmer at Pixar, who had been working on generating a complex still image of a bike shop. Lasseter, Reeves and Ostby wanted to try and give the film a distinctly "dark and moody" look by having it take place in a rainy city setting. When developing the story for the film, Lasseter said that he wanted to create something with more "pathos" behind it, jokingly referring the film's development as Pixar's "blue period" due to the emotional drive behind the short.

The film project came with two technical rationales; the bike shop scenes at the beginning and end were intended to demonstrate the rendering of highly complex imagery. Due to the geographical complexity the spoked bikes and the shop fixtures, a typical frame of animation from the scenes contained more than ten thousand geometric primitives, which in turn were made up of more than thirty million polygons. The dream sequence, on the other hand, was to demonstrate the rendering capabilities of the Pixar Image Computer. An engineer named Tony Apodaca had converted Pixar's rendering software to run on the PIC, but it turned out that the machine's design left its processors without enough memory to use a program as complex as Chapreyes, and thus Apodaca was able to convert only a portion of its features for use with the computers. On account of these limitations, the dream sequence ended up looking cruder than the rest of the film, and Red's Dream was the only Pixar film to be made using the PIC. The clown, nicknamed "Lumpy" by the filmmakers, was one of Pixar's first human characters; in order to give him an "organic" facial structure, the character was first sculpted into a model and then scanned into a computer using a digitizer. The scenes with juggling were created by animating the unicycle's path, and then put the balls into the setting, with a quadratic programming algorithm automatically calculating their traveling path. Due to the PIC's incapability of performing any motion blur, Lasseter instead used squash and stretch, which was also calculated by the QP, to convincingly animate the bouncing balls.

As Red's Dream was being developed, space at Pixar was growing tight in its Marin County bungalow; during production, the animation group, consisting of Lasseter alongside several "technical directors" who created models and shaders and such, worked out of a hallway. Towards the end of production, Lasseter worked and slept in the hallways for days on end. One night, about two weeks before the deadline for SIGGRAPH, an engineer named Jeff Mock brought his camcorder around and shot an ersatz interview with Lasseter, who joked about the conditions. He had just spent five days animating a sequence of three hundred frames-twelve and a half seconds of film.

Shortly following the completion of Red's Dream, animators Frank Thomas and Ollie Johnston, two of Walt Disney's legendary original nine animators known as the "Nine Old Men", visited Lasseter at Pixar and they watched a screening. Thomas was evidently freed of his former doubts about computer animation, expressed in a 1984 essay in which he argued computer animation could never produce anything as meaningful as its hand-drawn predecessor. After watching the film, he shook Lasseter's hand and stated meaningfully to him, "John, you did it."
