= Tin Toy =

1988 short film by John Lasseter

- Poster for Tin Toy
- Directed by: John Lasseter
- Story by: John Lasseter
- Produced by: William Reeves
- Cinematography: Tony Apodaca
- Edited by: Craig Good
- Production company: Pixar Animation Studios
- Distributed by: Direct Cinema
- Release dates: August 2, 1988 (SIGGRAPH); January 11, 2000 (with Toy Story Gold Classic Collection VHS); October 17, 2000 (with Toy Story 2-pack DVD)
- Running time: 5 minutes
- Country: United States
- Language: None
- Budget: $300,000

Tin Toy is a 1988 American animated short film produced by Pixar and directed by John Lasseter. The short film, which runs for five minutes, stars Tinny, a tin one-man band toy, trying to escape from Billy, a mischievous human baby. The third short film produced by the company's small animation division, it was a risky investment: due to the low revenue produced by Pixar's main product, the Pixar Image Computer, the company was under financial constraints.

Lasseter pitched the concept for Tin Toy by storyboard to Pixar owner Steve Jobs, who agreed to finance the short despite the company's struggles, which he kept alive with annual investment. The film was officially a test of the PhotoRealistic RenderMan software and proved new challenges to the animation team, namely the difficult task of realistically animating Billy. Tin Toy later gained attention from Disney, who sealed an agreement to create Toy Story starring Tom Hanks and Tim Allen, which was primarily inspired by elements from Tin Toy.

The short film debuted in an incomplete edit at the SIGGRAPH convention in August 1988 to a standing ovation from scientists and engineers. The film went on to claim Pixar's first Academy Award with the 1988 Academy Award for Best Animated Short Film, becoming the first animated film made using computer-generated imagery to win an Academy Award. With the award, Tin Toy went far to establish computer animation as a legitimate artistic medium outside SIGGRAPH and the animation-festival film circuit. In 2003, Tin Toy was selected for preservation in the United States National Film Registry by the Library of Congress as being "culturally, historically, or aesthetically significant".

== Plot ==
In a living room, a toy one-man band player named Tinny looks around and sees a baby named Billy arrive. At first, Tinny is delighted at the prospect of being played with by Billy until he sees how destructive the infant can be. When Tinny tries to walk out of Billy's reach, the musical instruments on the former's back begin to play, attracting Billy's attention. During a pursuit with the excited Billy chasing him, Tinny soon finds cover under a couch, where he finds a collection of toys in hiding, also seemingly afraid of Billy. Unaware of this, Billy loses his balance and falls face-first onto the hardwood floor, where he starts to cry. Feeling sorry for the baby, Tinny leaves his couch sanctuary and begins to play near Billy to calm him down. Upon seeing this, Billy stops crying and picks up Tinny to play with, the latter fearing the worst. However, Billy soon lets go of the toy, more interested in his carton. This annoys Tinny, who again plays music, following Billy around in hopes of being noticed. Eventually, Billy, whose face is now covered in a shopping bag, leaves the room, pursued by Tinny as the credits roll. After the credits roll, only two of the newly optimistic toys come out from underneath the couch. The film ends with Billy saying "Bye Bye!" to the audience.

== Background ==
Pixar, purchased in 1986 by entrepreneur and former Apple Computer head Steve Jobs, received many accolades for films produced by its small animation division, headed by former Disney animator John Lasseter. Lasseter's primary role, as defended to Jobs by company founders Edwin Catmull and Alvy Ray Smith, was to produce short films to promote the company's own Pixar Image Computers. The department was never meant to generate any revenue as far as Jobs was concerned, but after the release of two shorts, Luxo Jr. (1986) and Red's Dream (1987), some of the engineers working on the company's products wondered whether it made sense to keep the animation group going at all. Pixar was losing money every year and Jobs was supporting the cash-strapped company SO through a line of credit with his personal guarantee.

The engineers felt they were working hard to make money for Pixar while Lasseter's group was only spending it. Their passion was for building computers and software, not entertainment. Eventually, they discerned, to their chagrin, the reason why the company was supporting the division: the real priority of Catmull and Smith was to make films. The engineers were not alone in wondering about the value of Lasseter's short films. On repeated occasions in the late 1980s, Catmull barely dissuaded Jobs from shutting down the animation division due to financial constraints. At this same time, Jobs was clashing with Alvy Ray Smith, which would eventually lead to his resignation from Pixar after a heated argument during a meeting. Things were by no means well at the company and Lasseter and his team of animators knew this, and were afraid to ask for money to finance another short, which they storyboarded as Tin Toy.

== Production ==
In the spring of 1988, cash was running so short that Jobs convened a meeting to decree deep spending cuts across the board. When it was over, Lasseter and his animation group were almost too afraid to ask Jobs about authorizing some extra money for another short. Finally, they broached the topic and Jobs sat silent, looking skeptical. Tin Toy would require close to $300,000 more out of his pocket. After a few minutes, he asked if there were any storyboards. Catmull took him down to the animation offices, and Lasseter started his show. With the storyboards pinned on his wall, Lasseter did the voices and acted out the shots—just as story men had done on the Disney lot for decades—and thereby showed his passion for the project. The stakes here were much higher than before, however. Ralph Guggenheim, manager of the animation unit, recalled, "We knew that he wasn't just pitching for the film, he was pitching for the survival of the group." Jobs warmed up to the project and agreed to provide the money. "I believed in what John was doing," Jobs later said. "It was art. He cared, and I cared. I always said yes." His only comment at the end of Lasseter's presentation was, "All I ask of you, John, is to make it great."

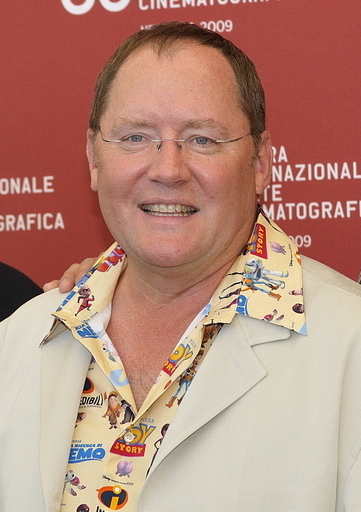
John Lasseter at the Venice Film Festival in 2009.

That fall, after completion of Red's Dream, most members of the company gathered at Stillwater Cove, near Fort Ross, to design new software that was designed completely for the work of an animator. From the meeting came Menv software ("modeling Environment"), the first program specifically designed to facilitate the workflow of an animator, separating the various phases of the animation (modeling, animation and lighting), later renamed Puppets. To show the application of the new program, it was approved the production of a short. Inspired by the birth of his daughter Julia, William Reeves proposed the idea to create a human baby. Lasseter had an inspiration for the new opera based on the observation of his nephew, intent to put any toy in the mouth on the way. Lasseter said, "In terms of toys the child must have seemed a terrible monster!"

The story was about Lasseter's love, classic toys, and was inspired by a visit made in 1987 at the Tin Toy Museum in Yokohama, Japan. It was told from the perspective of a toy one-man band named Tinny, who meets a baby that charms and terrorizes him. Escaping under the couch, Tinny finds other frightened toys, but when the baby hits his head and cries, Tinny goes back out to cheer him up. Tin Toy was inspired much like Luxo Jr., namely, Lasseter's observations of a friend's baby. This time, he opted for a more ambitious task, attempting to mimic a human baby in its appearance, the movement of its arms, and its fickle moods.

The short film was officially a test of the PhotoRealistic RenderMan software. This was the only Pixar short rendered on the RM-1, a RenderMan specific computer that was never sold to the public. As with Luxo Jr. and Red's Dream, it was also a chance for Lasseter to one-up his earlier efforts, taking his animation and storytelling to another level. The baby proved difficult to model and animate; "it just became an incredible burden," remembered Flip Phillips, a new member of the team at the time. In early attempts at a model of the baby's head, he appeared to have the face of a middle-aged man. The final version of the baby (known to the team as Billy) had a much-improved face with 40 separate facial muscles, but his skin had the look of plastic. When he moved, moreover, his body lacked the natural give of baby fat and his diaper had the solidity of cement—compromises made necessary by lack of time and the still-developing technology.

The picture on the table is a photograph of director John Lasseter.

== Release ==
Lasseter and his technical directors slept under their desks at times to get Tin Toy finished before SIGGRAPH in Atlanta in August 1988, but to no avail. What the SIGGRAPH audience saw was the first three-fifths or so of the film, ending a cliffhanger moment with Tinny running into his box and watching in horror through the box's cellophane as Billy advances towards him. "Even though it wasn't complete, people were wowed by it," producer Ralph Guggenheim remembered. The audience of scientists and engineers to which it was shown at SIGGRAPH greeted it with a standing ovation. These praises were joined over the years, positive assessments of public and critics, who praised the innovation and technology in it. Luke Bonanno called it "One of the best Pixar short films," while other critics wrote that the film was "A fascinating glimpse of a fledgling art form." and many praised the ability to move in just a few minutes and have been able to "encompass the full range of emotions you feel when a toy is used by a child." Some criticisms were leveled at the character of Billy, who was called "the most frightening and disturbing piece of animation in the history of this art form." Dario Floreano stated that the uncanny valley concept was taken seriously by the film industry because of negative audience reactions to Billy. It is unknown when this short was first released in its entirety.

Tin Toy went on to take the Academy Award for Best Animated Short in 1989 at the 61st Academy Awards, it was the third CGI short film to get nominated for the Academy Award (behind Hunger and Luxo Jr.) and was the first CGI animated short film to receive an Academy Award. With the award, Tin Toy went far to establish computer animation as a legitimate artistic medium outside SIGGRAPH and the animation-festival film circuit. A member of the Academy's board of governors, animator William Littlejohn, saw in Tin Toy a window into the potential of the young medium. "There is a realism that's rather astonishing," he told The New York Times. "It emulates photography, but with artistic staging." Robert Winquist, head of the character animation program at CalArts, went further, predicting that computer animation was "going to take over in a short time." He publicly advised animators, "Put down your pencil and your paintbrush and do it another way."

The short film was selected for preservation in the United States National Film Registry by the Library of Congress as being "culturally, historically, or aesthetically significant" in 2003. Tin Toy garnered some home media releases via inclusion on Tiny Toy Stories in 1996, the VHS and DVD releases of Toy Story in 2000, and the Pixar Short Films Collection, Volume 1 (2007). Tin Toy is also available for streaming on Disney+.

=== Academy Award ===
1988 – Best Animated Short Film

=== Other awards ===
1989 – Seattle International Film Festival – Best Short Film
1989 – World Animation Celebration – Best Computer-Assisted Animation
2003 – National Film Registry

== Merchandising ==
Apart from the home video editions of the short film, Tin Toy was not the subject of any type of merchandise, like all of the other short films that have been produced by the company. The only exception is the reproduction of vinyl Tinny, produced by MINDStyle in 2010. Pixar, in fact, sold the license to the manufacturer of Tin Toy MINDStyle objects, which created a maquette of the vinyl character Tinny inside of the line Art Toy Collectible limited Edition of 500 pieces, the price of ninety dollars. The box, which is a faithful reproduction of the packaging of the toy view in short, in addition to containing the model of Tinny, presents a certificate of authenticity printed on a card showing the storyboard in pencil of a scene from the short.

== Cancelled holiday special ==
The success of Tin Toy gained attention from Disney CEO Michael Eisner and Walt Disney Studios chairman Jeffrey Katzenberg, who approached Pixar to produce a computer-animated film. In the early 1990s, Pixar began to make arrangements with Disney to produce the first computer-animated film. The project went through, but considering the abrupt transition from shorts to feature a few minutes to an hour and a half, Pixar set out to create a special half-hour to see if they could manage a production that was similar to that of an actual film. Driven by the victory at the Oscars that year, a sequel to Tin Toy called "A Tin Toy Christmas," was originally planned as a half-hour-long television special to be used to convince film studios that Pixar was capable of producing a feature film. This idea was brought to the table at the initial talks with Disney for Toy Story. The basic idea was that Tinny was part of a set of toy players who are not successful and remain unsold for years. Separated from other components, Tinny ends up by mistake in a toy shop of our age where he meets several characters, including a soft pink bear named Lotso.

The project was abandoned because the television network that would have produced the film could not afford the fees required (according to director Pete Docter, the special would have required a sum of eighteen times higher than the allowed budget). Disney was uninterested in the concept and urged Pixar to produce a feature immediately, which became a critical and commercial success. The character of Lotso, however, was adapted for Toy Story 3, as the main villain, while the other toys also made an appearance in the said film, where they're seen in the caterpillar room and also hiding from toddlers.

Tinny himself makes a cameo in Toy Story 4, appearing when Woody and Bo Peep enter a pinball machine to meet Duke Caboom.

== See also ==
- Toy Story (1995), Pixar's first computer-animated feature film which grew out of a Tin Toy sequel.
- The Brave Little Toaster (1987)
