= Pixar Short Films Collection, Volume 1 =

- DVD cover of Pixar Short Films Collection, Volume 1.
- Production companies: Pixar Animation Studios; Walt Disney Pictures
- Distributed by: Walt Disney Home Entertainment
- Release date: November 6, 2007 (United States)
- Running time: 54 minutes (2-8 minutes each short film)
- Country: United States

Pixar Short Films Collection, Volume 1 is a home video compilation released by Walt Disney Home Entertainment on November 6, 2007, containing 13 of Pixar's short films. It was followed by Pixar Short Films Collection, Volume 2, which was released on November 13, 2012, and Pixar Short Films Collection, Volume 3, which was released on November 13, 2018.

== Background and development ==
Commenting on Pixar Short Films Collection, Volume 1, John Lasseter said:

I am really excited about finally coming out with a collection of the Pixar short films because these have been so much a part of the history of Pixar. The early short films before Toy Story came out really shows the evolution and the focus of kind of the history of Pixar and the development of the technology, the development of me as a filmmaker and a storyteller, and then our continued dedication to creating short films after Toy Story and the coming out of, trying out of new talent and continuing the R&D research and stuff. And, for me, I love the short film because there are certain ideas that are perfect for short film that are not necessarily meant for a feature film. And it's still worth doing.

Lasseter hoped that audiences will get a "kick out" of each of the shorts included in the collection, stating: "I hope that they look at them and just are surprised by how funny they are. All I think except one are basically no dialogue. It's like Chuck Jones said, 'With great animation, you should be able to turn the sound off and still tell what's going on.' And I think they're these wonderful little gems and they're really entertaining. It shows also the ability of our filmmakers to be able to, in a short amount of time – one and half minutes to five minutes and without dialogue – still establish really memorable characters."

The version of Knick Knack included with this release was the censored version which was first released in 2003 with the cinema release of Finding Nemo. The censored version removes the exaggerated breasts on the woman on the "Miami" knick knack and on the mermaid sitting on the rock in the fish bowl. John Lasseter defended these changes by saying "It wasn't big bad Disney coming in and insisting we do this... it was our own choice. It was just crossing the line for me personally as a father. So I made the decision to reduce [these characters'] breast size."

== Critical response ==
Pixar Short Films Collection, Volume 1 received acclaim from contemporary critics. The film review aggregation website Rotten Tomatoes reports that 100% of critics have given the compilation a positive review based on 5 reviews, with a perfect score of 10/10.

Kevin Carr of 7M Pictures wrote that "with how affordable DVDs are to rent", there are few that he would recommend as a "must-buy", citing Pixar Short Films Collection, Volume 1 as an exception, "considering the wealth of entertainment and historical value" it contains. Carr explained that while he loved the Pixar theatrical films immensely, "one of the extra bonuses of seeing them is the short films they always tag on the beginning". He revealed that he enjoyed watching the short films "almost as much" as the films itself and that the short films attached to later DVD releases were "equally as fun to watch". Carr expressed his hopes for Pixar to be around for "many years to come" and continue to provide "some of the best animated entertainment ever seen". He concluded his review by stating that it is "going to be too long to wait for the Pixar Short Film Collection: Volume II, but I guess we'll just have to be patient."

Writing for Movie Metropolis, John J. Puccio declared that while those who have previously collected Pixar's full-length feature films on home video will already own some of the shorts featured on Pixar Short Films Collection, Volume 1, it's "nice to have all of them collected together in one spot". He wrote that "they're worth having, if for no other reasons than because they chronicle the history of the studio so well and because the Pixar filmmakers execute some of them as brilliantly as they do any of their main attractions". According to Puccio, there is no doubt that the later Pixar shorts are "among the finest cartoons ever made". He wrote that while the earlier ones are also "interesting and certainly innovative", they don't "bear repeat viewing as much". Puccio declared that if there were any negatives about the collection, it would be its length, but stated that "it makes one wonder what Volume 2 will bring our way in a few more years". Writing for The A.V. Club, Tasha Robinson declared Pixar Short Films Collection, Volume 1 to display the "stunning progress" that Pixar has made in turning computer animation into a "rich artistic medium". Robinson cited the collection as "an informative, touching 23-minute pocket history of Pixar."

== Shorts ==
No.	Title	Directed by	Written by	Original release date
1	The Adventures of André & Wally B.	Alvy Ray Smith	Alvy Ray Smith	July 25, 1984
2	Luxo Jr.	John Lasseter	John Lasseter	August 17, 1986
3	Red's Dream	John Lasseter	John Lasseter	July 10, 1987
4	Tin Toy	John Lasseter	John Lasseter	August 2, 1988
5	Knick Knack	John Lasseter	John Lasseter	September 1, 1989
6	Geri's Game	Jan Pinkava	Jan Pinkava	November 24, 1997
7	For the Birds	Ralph Eggleston	Ralph Eggleston	June 5, 2000
8	Mike's New Car	Pete Docter and Roger L. Gould	Pete Docter, Jeff Pidgeon, Roger L. Gould and Robert Gibbs	September 17, 2002
9	Boundin'	Bud Luckey	Bud Luckey	December 2003
10	Jack-Jack Attack	Brad Bird	Mark Andrews, Robert Gibbs, Teddy Newton and Bosco Ng	March 15, 2005
11	One Man Band	Andrew Jimenez and Mark Andrews	Andrew Jimenez and Mark Andrews	June 11, 2005
12	Lifted	Gary Rydstrom	Gary Rydstrom	October 12, 2006
13	Mater and the Ghostlight	John Lasseter	Joe Ranft, John Lasseter and Dan Scanlon	November 7, 2006

=== Bonus shorts ===
Included as a supplement are four shorts made for Sesame Street—"Surprise", "Light and Heavy", "Up and Down", and "Front and Back"—in 1991. As an Easter egg, the pencil test version of Luxo Jr. is found in the "Short Films" menu by clicking the yellow Luxo Jr. icon below the icon to access the Boundin' short film.

== Release history ==
Country	Date	Format
Germany	October 4, 2007	DVD
Germany	October 9, 2007	Blu-ray
Canada	November 6, 2007	Blu-ray
Canada	November 6, 2007	DVD
United States	November 6, 2007	Blu-ray
United States	November 6, 2007	DVD
United Kingdom	November 26, 2007	DVD (rental copy)
United Kingdom	November 26, 2007	Blu-ray (rental copy)
France	December 5, 2007	DVD
France	December 5, 2007	Blu-ray
Australia	December 19, 2007	DVD
Australia	December 19, 2007	Blu-ray
United Kingdom	February 11, 2008	DVD
United Kingdom	February 11, 2008	Blu-ray
United Kingdom	June 23, 2008	DVD
United Kingdom	June 30, 2008	Blu-ray
Canada	October 4, 2011	Blu-ray + DVD
United States	October 4, 2011	Blu-ray + DVD
Canada	October 9, 2011	Disney Movies Anywhere (reduced version; "Lifted" not included)
United States	October 9, 2011	Disney Movies Anywhere (reduced version; "Lifted" not included)

The compilation made its television premiere on ABC Family on December 2, 2009. In order to fill a two-hour timeslot with commercials, additional shorts were added to the compilation, including Presto (2008), BURN-E (2008), the first three Mater's Tall Tales shorts, Your Friend the Rat (2007), and a few Toy Story Treats interstitials. An opening title screen and closing credits were also added.
