= Anthony Apodaca =

American computer graphics professional

Anthony A. Apodaca is Director of Graphics Research and Development at Pixar. He is co-creator of the RenderMan Interface Specification (RISpec). His film credits include almost all of the titles produced by Pixar.

== Awards ==
In 1993, Apodaca, along with 6 others, received an Academy Award in science and engineering for the development of RenderMan software.

In 2013, he won the 13th Visual Effects Society Awards award for Outstanding Visual Effects in a Special Venue Project for the 3D dark ride RATATOUILLE: L’Aventure Totalement Torquee de Remy and received a nomination at the 2018 16th Visual Effects Society Awards for Outstanding Visual Effects in a Special Venue Project for Nemo & Friends SeaRider, a simulator ride at Tokyo DisneySea.

== Bibliography ==
- Anthony A. Apodaca, Larry Gritz: Advanced RenderMan: Creating CGI for Motion Pictures, Morgan Kaufmann Publishers, ISBN 1-55860-618-1
