= Luxo Jr. =

1986 animated short film directed by John Lasseter

- Theatrical release poster
- Directed by: John Lasseter
- Written by: John Lasseter
- Produced by: John Lasseter; Bill Reeves
- Cinematography: Don Conway
- Edited by: Craig Good
- Music by: Brian Bennett
- Production company: Pixar Animation Studios
- Distributed by: Direct Cinema
- Release dates: August 17, 1986 (SIGGRAPH); November 24, 1999 (with Toy Story 2)
- Running time: 2 minutes
- Country: United States

Luxo Jr. (also known as Luxo Junior) is a 1986 American animated short film produced and released by Pixar. Written and directed by John Lasseter, the two-minute short film revolves around one larger and one smaller desk lamp. The larger lamp, named Luxo Sr., looks on while the smaller, "younger" Luxo Jr. plays exuberantly with a ball to the extent that it accidentally deflates. Luxo Jr. was Pixar's first animation after Ed Catmull and John Lasseter left the Lucasfilm Computer Division. The film is the source of Luxo Jr., the mascot of Pixar.

Lasseter aimed to finish the short film for the 1986 SIGGRAPH, an annual computer graphics conference attended by thousands of industry professionals. The film would come from his experiments with modeling his Luxo lamp. Lasseter worked to improve the story within the allotted two minutes. In animation, the film demonstrates the use of shadow maps within the rendering software. Lasseter applied the classic animation principles popularized by Disney's Nine Old Men to convey the lamps' emotions. Catmull and Lasseter worked around the clock, and Lasseter even took a sleeping bag into work and slept under his desk, ready to work early the next morning. Ultimately, the film took four and a half months to be completed.

The short film debuted at SIGGRAPH 1986 in Dallas, Texas. Before the film finished playing, the audience had already risen in applause. Luxo Jr. is regarded as a breakthrough in the animation industry as a whole, changing traditionalists' interpretation of computer animation. The short was the first work of animation to use procedural animation, the software written by Eben Ostby. It received an Academy Award nomination for Best Animated Short Film, becoming the first CGI film nominated for an Academy Award.

The soundtrack music is an uncredited edit of three compositions on Brian Bennett's album (from Bruton Music) BRD17: Counterpoint In Rhythm: "Finesse", "Quicksilver", and "Chateau Latour".

In 2014, Luxo Jr. was deemed "culturally, historically, or aesthetically significant" by the Library of Congress and selected for preservation in the United States National Film Registry.

== Plot ==
In a dark room, a large illuminated balanced-arm desk lamp named Luxo Sr. sees a small yellow ball with a blue stripe and a red star on the front roll-up to him. He eyes the ball curiously and pushes it away, but the ball comes back to him. He pushes it away again, but it rolls past him as Luxo Jr., his happy and excited son, hops over and plays with the ball. Luxo Jr. then balances himself on top of the ball and bounces on it excessively, causing it to deflate. Luxo Jr. flips the deflated ball onto its side and looks up at Luxo Sr., who gently admonishes his son. Luxo Jr. then hops offscreen in shame but is later seen playing with a beach ball. Luxo Sr. looks at the camera, then shakes his head in embarrassment.

== Background ==
The Graphics Group, which was one-third of the Computer Division of Lucasfilm, had been associating with Industrial Light & Magic on computer-generated graphics in the early 1980s. In 1984, the group produced an animated short film titled The Adventures of André & Wally B., which premiered at the annual SIGGRAPH conference to great fanfare. The group, which numbered 40 individuals, was spun out as a corporation in February 1986 with investment by Steve Jobs shortly after he left Apple Computer. Jobs paid $5 million to George Lucas for technology rights and put them and $5 million cash as capital into the company. A factor contributing to Lucas' sale was an increase in cash flow difficulties following his 1983 divorce, which coincided with the sudden dropoff in revenues from Star Wars licenses following the release of Return of the Jedi. The newly independent company was headed by Dr. Edwin Catmull as president and Dr. Alvy Ray Smith as Executive Vice President. They were joined on the Board of Directors by Steve Jobs who was chairman.

Pixar's small animation department—consisting of Lasseter, plus the part-time supporting efforts of several graphics scientists—was never meant to generate any revenue as far as Jobs was concerned. Catmull and Smith justified its existence on the basis that more films that were shown at SIGGRAPH like The Adventures of André and Wally B. would promote the company's computers. The group had no film at SIGGRAPH the preceding year, its last year under Lucas's wing, apart from a stained-glass knight sequence they produced for Young Sherlock Holmes. Catmull was determined that Pixar would have a film to show at its first SIGGRAPH as an independent company in August 1986. Luxo Jr. was produced by Pixar employee John Lasseter as a demonstration of the Pixar Image Computer's capabilities.

Two other short animations produced by two of the company's graphics experts were in production during the time in which Luxo Jr. was conceived. Bill Reeves, who was interested in algorithms to re-create the turbulence of ocean waves, made Flags and Waves, with waves reflecting a sunset and lapping against the shore. Eben Ostby, a Brown architecture major turned graphics programmer, made Beach Chair, starring a chair that walked across the sand and nervously approached the water, dipped its front legs in just far enough to test the temperature, then scurried along. Reeves and Ostby also assisted Lasseter with model making and rendering on the short film.

== Production ==
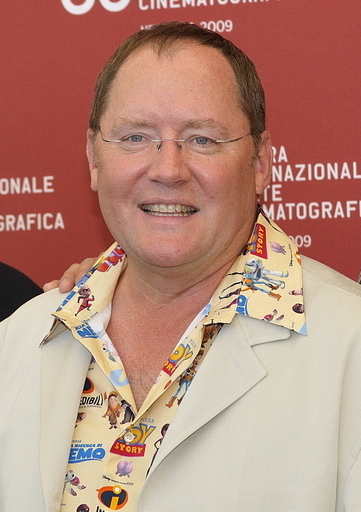
John Lasseter in 2009

Lasseter's student film at CalArts, The Lady and the Lamp, applied Walt Disney's observation that giving lifelike qualities to inanimate objects held comic potential. Luxo Jr. displayed a further insight, however: that inanimate objects as characters held the potential for dramatic value as well. The film would come from Lasseter's experiments with modeling his Luxo lamp. He had felt an inspiration strike when fellow employee Tom Porter brought his infant son Spencer to work one day and Lasseter, playing with the child, became fascinated with his proportions. A baby's head was huge compared with the rest of its body, Lasseter realized. It struck Lasseter as humorous and he began to wonder what a young lamp would look like. He fiddled with the dimensions of all the parts of his Luxo model—all but the bulb since lightbulbs come from a store and don't grow, he reasoned—and he emerged with a second character, Luxo Jr.

Lasseter initially intended Luxo Jr. as a plotless character study. When he showed some early tests at an animation festival in Brussels, Belgium, respected Belgian animator Raoul Servais exhorted him, "No matter how short it is, it should have a beginning, a middle, and an end. Don't forget the story." Lasseter protested that the film would be too short for a story. "You can tell a story in ten seconds", Servais responded. Lasseter was convinced. He devised a simple plotline in which the two lamps would play a game of catch with an inflated ball; Luxo Jr. would then approach the ball, hop onto it, bounce until the ball popped under him, and show dejection as the parent lamp looked on. Finally, Luxo Jr. would reappear feeling excited with a new, larger ball. Among the films shown at SIGGRAPH in 1985, Lasseter particularly admired a piece of character animation called Tony de Peltrie, which came from a group at the University of Montreal; it featured a strikingly expressive human character, an aging piano player who entertained while inwardly reflecting on better days, which inspired the film.

Apart from the film's hoped-for promotional value, Catmull and Smith rationalized the project as a test of "self-shadowing" in the rendering software- that is, the ability of objects to shed light and shadows on themselves. Before self-shadowing, CGI shadows were made by adding a flattened and darkened version of the shadowed object. On the technical level, the film demonstrates the use of shadow maps to simulate the shifting light and shadow given by the animated lamps. The lights and the color surfaces of all the objects are calculated, each using a RenderMan surface shader, not surface textures. The articulation of "limbs" is carefully coordinated, and power cords trail believably behind the moving lamps.

Because time and money were tight, Lasseter reduced the setting to its simplest elements. The background would be plain black and there would be no camera movement. His energies would rather be focused instead on working out techniques based on classic animation principles to convey emotion. Even though the characters were faceless and wordless, Lasseter shaped such subtleties as the speed of the child's hops and the way it carried its head to convey in an instant when the child was feeling joy and when it was feeling sad. At every moment, the parent and child seemed to have a definite frame of mind. On the cinematic level, it demonstrates a simple and entertaining story, including effectively expressive individual characters. Catmull and Lasseter worked around the clock, and Lasseter even took a sleeping bag into work and slept under his desk, ready to work early the next morning.

== Release ==
As soon as the lamp moved, people started going crazy. And then the ball came in, and they were going nuts. Poor Gary Rydstrom, his wonderful sound work was never heard at that screening because the crowd was just literally screaming their heads off.

— Craig Good, reflecting on the short's debut at SIGGRAPH

Luxo Jr., alongside Flags and Waves and Beach Chair, debuted at SIGGRAPH in the Dallas Convention Center Arena, where the audience of six thousand immediately recognized the short film as a breakthrough. Before Luxo Jr. finished playing at SIGGRAPH, the crowd had already risen in applause. "Pixar's marketing department did not go out of its way to point out that none of the film, not a single frame, had been rendered on a Pixar Image Computer", wrote David Price in his book The Pixar Touch. The audience was captivated by the far more realistic look than The Adventures of André and Wally B.. More significant than its photorealism, however, was its emotional realism. "It was perhaps the first computer-animated film that enabled viewers to forget they were watching computer animation", wrote Price.

Afterward, Lasseter saw Jim Blinn, a longtime professional colleague, approaching him, obviously readying a question. Lasseter braced for a question about the shadowing algorithm or some other recondite technical issue that he knew equally little about. Blinn instead asked whether the big lamp was the mother or the father. Although the memories of those involved are now hazy, Lasseter elsewhere referred to the parent lamp as the father. Lasseter then realized that he had succeeded in applying the Disney touch of thought and emotion to his characters.

"Luxo Jr. sent shock waves through the entire industry – to all of the corners for computer and traditional animation. At that time, most traditional artists were afraid of the computer. They did not realize that the computer was merely a different tool in the artist's kit but instead perceived it as a type of automation that might endanger their jobs. Luckily, this attitude changed dramatically in the early '80s with the use of personal computers in the home. The release of our Luxo Jr. [...] reinforced this opinion turnaround within the professional community." – Edwin Catmull, Computer Animation: A Whole New World, 1998.

Luxo Jr. was nominated for the Academy Award for Best Animated Short in 1987 at the 59th Academy Awards, becoming the first CGI-animated short film to be nominated for an Academy Award. It won the Golden Nica in the "Computer Animation/Film/ VFX” category of the Ars Electronica Festival in Linz in 1987.

The short was later released in theaters with Toy Story 2 in 1999, subsequently appearing on its VHS and DVD releases in 2000. In this version, the short is preceded by the message, "In 1986 Pixar Animation Studios produced its first film. This is why we have a hopping lamp in our logo." It also saw release on home video as part of Tiny Toy Stories in 1996 and Pixar Short Films Collection, Volume 1 in 2007. It was also featured on the Toy Story Deluxe CAV LaserDisc in 1996.
