= John Lasseter =

American filmmaker and animator (born 1957)

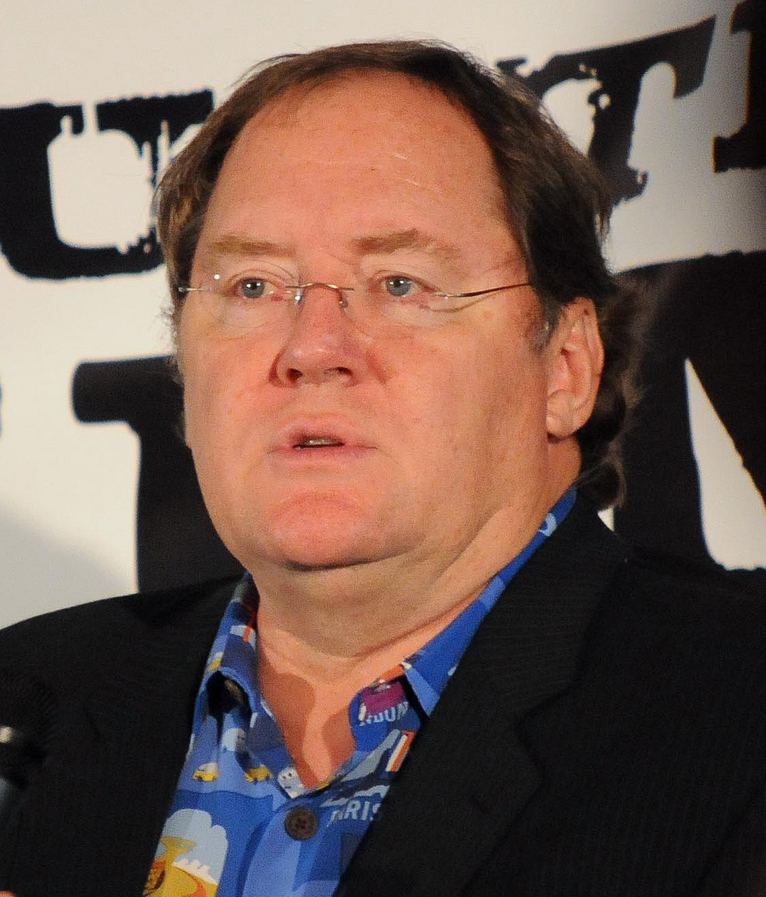
- Lasseter in 2011
- Born: John Alan Lasseter; January 12, 1957 (age 69); Los Angeles, California, U.S.
- Education: California Institute of the Arts (BFA)
- Occupations: Film director; producer; screenwriter; animator; voice actor
- Years active: 1978–present
- Employers: Walt Disney Animation Studios (1979–1983, 2006–2018); Lucasfilm (1983–1986); Pixar Animation Studios (1986–2018); Skydance Animation (2019–present)
- Title: Head of Skydance Animation
- Spouse: Nancy Lasseter (m. 1988)
- Children: 5
- Awards: Academy Award (1989, 1996); Golden Globe Award (2007); Inkpot Award (2009); Emmy Award (2010–2011)

John Alan Lasseter (/ˈlæsətər/ LASS-ə-tər; born January 12, 1957) is an American film director, producer, screenwriter, and animator. He was previously the chief creative officer of Pixar Animation Studios, Walt Disney Animation Studios, and Disneytoon Studios, as well as the principal creative advisor for Walt Disney Imagineering, and has served as the head of animation at Skydance Animation since 2019.

Lasseter began his career as an animator with the Walt Disney Company. After being fired from Disney for promoting computer animation, he joined Lucasfilm, where he collaborated on the then-groundbreaking usage of CGI animation. The Graphics Group of the Computer Division of Lucasfilm was sold to Steve Jobs and became Pixar in 1986. Lasseter oversaw all of Pixar's films and associated projects. He personally directed Toy Story (1995), A Bug's Life (1998), Toy Story 2 (1999), Cars (2006), and Cars 2 (2011), and executive-produced all other Pixar films through 2018. From 2006 to 2018, Lasseter also oversaw all of Walt Disney Animation Studios' (and its division Disneytoon Studios') films and associated projects as executive producer.

His works have grossed more than US$19 billion, making him one of the most financially successful filmmakers of all time. Of the ten animated films that have grossed over US$1 billion, five of them were executive produced by Lasseter: Toy Story 3 (2010)—the first animated film to surpass $1 billion—and Frozen (2013)—the seventh-highest-grossing animated film of all time—as well as Zootopia (2016), Finding Dory (2016), and Incredibles 2 (2018). He has won two Academy Awards, for Best Animated Short Film (for Tin Toy), as well as a Special Achievement Award (for Toy Story).

In November 2017, Lasseter took a six-month sabbatical from Pixar and Disney Animation after being accused by employees of sexual misconduct. According to various news outlets, the alleged misconduct had occurred over a number of years. In June 2018, it was announced that Lasseter would be leaving the company at the end of the year when his contract expired; he took on a consulting role until then. Following his departure from Disney and Pixar, Lasseter was later hired by Skydance founder and CEO David Ellison to run the animation division Skydance Animation.

== Early life ==
Lasseter was born on January 12, 1957, in Los Angeles, and grew up in the suburb of Whittier. His mother, Jewell Mae (née Risley; 1918–2005), was an art teacher at Bell Gardens High School, and his father, Paul Eual Lasseter (1924–2011), was a parts manager at a Chevrolet dealership.

Lasseter is a fraternal twin; his sister Johanna Lasseter-Curtis, who became a baker based in the Lake Tahoe area, is six minutes older.

His mother's profession contributed to his growing preoccupation with animation. He often drew cartoons during services at the Church of Christ church his family regularly attended. As a child, Lasseter would race home from school to watch Chuck Jones cartoons on television. While in high school, he read The Art of Animation by Bob Thomas. The book covered the history of Disney animation and explored the making of Disney's 1959 film Sleeping Beauty, which made Lasseter realize he wanted to do animation himself. When he saw a screening of Disney's 1963 film The Sword in the Stone at the Wardman Theater, he knew early in his youth that he wanted to become an animator. He then read Preston Blair's book about animation, and made flipbooks based on Blair's walk cycles. One of his friends had a Super 8 camera that shot single frames, which was used to shoot some of his earlier animation efforts.

Lasseter heard of a new character animation program at the California Institute of the Arts (often abbreviated as 'CalArts') and decided to follow his dream of becoming an animator. His mother further encouraged him to take up a career in animation, and, after graduating from Whittier High School in 1975, he enrolled as the second student (Jerry Rees was the first) in the CalArts Character Animation program created by Disney animators Jack Hannah and T. Hee. Lasseter was taught by three members of Disney's Nine Old Men team of veteran animators—Eric Larson, Frank Thomas and Ollie Johnston—and his classmates included future animators and directors like Brad Bird, John Musker, Henry Selick, Tim Burton, and Chris Buck. During his time there, he produced two animated shorts—Lady and the Lamp (1979) and Nitemare (1980)—which each won the student Academy Award for Animation.

While at CalArts, Lasseter first started working for the Walt Disney Company at Disneyland in Anaheim during summer breaks and got a job as a Jungle Cruise skipper, where he learned the basics of comedy and comic timing to entertain captive audiences on the ride.

== Career ==
=== First years at Disney ===
Upon graduating in 1979, Lasseter immediately obtained a job as an animator at Walt Disney Productions mostly due to his success with his student project, Lady and the Lamp. The studio had reviewed approximately 10,000 portfolios in the late 1970s in search of talent, then selected only about 150 candidates as apprentices, of which only about 45 were kept on permanently. In the fall of 1979, Disney animator Mel Shaw told the Los Angeles Times that "John's got an instinctive feel for character and movement and shows every indication of blossoming here at our studios ... In time, he'll make a fine contribution." At that same time, Lasseter worked on a sequence titled "The Emperor and the Nightingale" (based on The Nightingale by Hans Christian Andersen) for a Disney project called Musicana. Musicana was never released but eventually led to the development of Fantasia 2000 (1999).

However, after One Hundred and One Dalmatians (1961), which in Lasseter's opinion was the film where Disney had reached its highest plateau, he felt that the studio had lost momentum and was often repeating itself. Between 1980 and 1981, he coincidentally came across some video tapes from one of the then new computer-graphics conferences, who showed some of the very beginnings of computer animation, primarily floating spheres and such, which he experienced as a revelation. But it was not until shortly after, when he was invited by his friends Jerry Rees and Bill Kroyer, while working on Mickey's Christmas Carol (1983), to come and see the first light cycle sequences for an upcoming film entitled Tron (1982), featuring state-of-the-art computer-generated imagery (CGI), that he saw the huge potential of this new technology in animation. Up to that time, the studio had used a multiplane camera to add depth to its animation. Lasseter realized that computers could be used to make films with three-dimensional backgrounds where traditionally animated characters could interact to add a new level of visually stunning depth that had not been possible before. He knew adding dimension to animation had been a longtime dream of animators, going back to Walt Disney.

Later, he and Glen Keane talked about how great it would be to make an animated feature where the background was computer-generated, and then showed Keane the book The Brave Little Toaster by Thomas Disch, which he thought would be a good candidate for the film. Keane agreed, but first, they decided to do a short test film to see how it worked out and chose Where the Wild Things Are, a decision based on the fact that Disney had considered producing a feature based on the works of Maurice Sendak. Satisfied with the result, Lasseter, Keane and executive Thomas L. Wilhite went on with the project, especially Lasseter who dedicated himself to it, while Keane eventually went on to work with The Great Mouse Detective (1986).

Lasseter and his colleagues unknowingly stepped on some of their direct superiors' toes by circumventing them in their enthusiasm to get the Where the Wild Things Are project into motion. The project was canceled while being pitched to two of Lasseter's supervisors, animation administrator Ed Hansen, and head of Disney studios, Ron W. Miller, due to lack of perceived cost benefits for the mix of traditional and computer animation. A few minutes after the meeting, Lasseter was summoned by Hansen to his office. As Lasseter recalled, Hansen told him, "Well, John, your project is now complete, so your employment with the Disney Studios is now terminated." Wilhite, who was part of Disney's live-action group and therefore had no obligations to the animation studio, was able to arrange to keep Lasseter around temporarily until the Wild Things test project was complete in January 1984, but with the understanding there would be no further work for Lasseter at Disney Animation. The Brave Little Toaster would later become a 2D animated feature film directed by one of Lasseter's friends, Jerry Rees, and co-produced by Wilhite (who had, by then, left to start Hyperion Pictures), and some of the staff of Pixar would be involved in the film alongside Lasseter.

=== Lucasfilm and Pixar ===
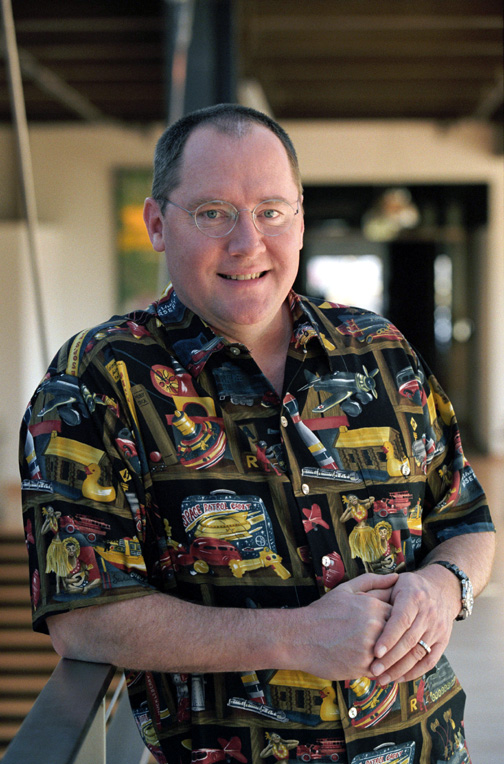
Lasseter in 2002

While putting together a crew for the planned feature, Lasseter had made some contacts in the computer industry, among them Alvy Ray Smith and Ed Catmull at Lucasfilm Computer Graphics Group. After being fired, and feeling glum knowing his employment with Disney was to end shortly, Lasseter visited a computer graphics conference in November 1983 at the Queen Mary in Long Beach, where he met and talked to Catmull again. Catmull inquired about The Brave Little Toaster, which Lasseter explained had been shelved. From his experience at Lucasfilm, Catmull assumed Lasseter was simply between projects since Hollywood studios have traditionally laid off employees when they lack enough productions to keep them busy. Still devastated at being forced out of the only company he had ever wanted to work for, Lasseter could not find the strength to tell Catmull that he had been fired.

Catmull later telephoned Smith that day and mentioned that Lasseter was not working at Disney. Smith told Catmull to put down the phone and hire Lasseter right away. Lasseter agreed instantly to work freelance with Catmull and his colleagues and joined them for a week of December 1983 on a project that resulted in their first computer-animated short: The Adventures of André & Wally B., meant to prove it was possible to do character animation on a computer. After his work on the Where the Wild Things Are-test, Lasseter assumed hand-drawn characters in a CGI environment was the only way, but Catmull insisted it could be done, it was just that nobody had given it an attempt before. Because Catmull was not allowed to hire animators, he was given the title "Interface Designer"; "Nobody knew what that was but they didn't question it in budget meetings". Lasseter spent a lot of time at Lucasfilm in the San Francisco Bay Area in the spring of 1984, where he worked together closely with Catmull and his team of computer science researchers. Lasseter learned how to use some of their software, and in turn, he taught the computer scientists about filmmaking, animation, and art. The short turned out to be more revolutionary than Lasseter first had visualized before he came to Lucasfilm. His original idea had been to create only the backgrounds on computers, but in the final short everything was computer-animated, including the characters.

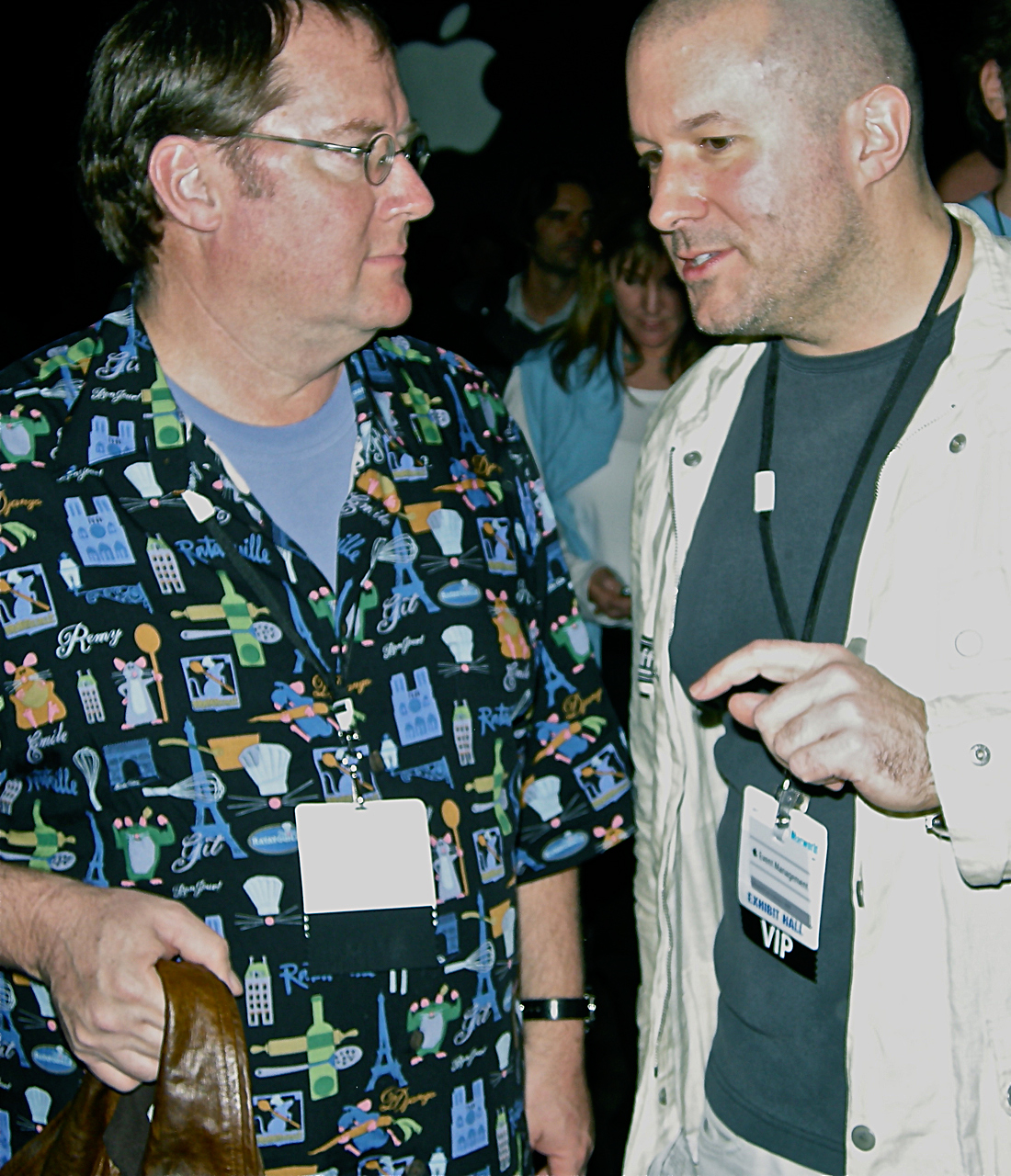
Lasseter with Apple CDO Sir Jony Ive at Macworld/iWorld in 2008

After the short CGI film was presented at SIGGRAPH in the summer of 1984, Lasseter returned to Los Angeles with the hope of directing The Brave Little Toaster at Hyperion Pictures. He soon learned that funding had fallen through and called Catmull with the bad news. Catmull called back with a job offer, and Lasseter joined Lucasfilm as a full-time employee in October 1984 and moved to the Bay Area. After that, he worked with ILM on the special effects on Young Sherlock Holmes, where he made the first fully computer-generated photorealistic animated character, a knight composed of elements from a stained glass window. This effect was the first CGI character to be scanned and painted directly onto film using a laser. Lasseter and Catmull's collaboration, which has since lasted over thirty years, would ultimately result in Toy Story (1995), which was the first-ever computer-animated feature film. Additionally, Lasseter was involved in the creation of THX's robot mascot Tex. Tex made his first appearance in 1996 with the original theatrical release of Independence Day. Since then, Tex has appeared in some THX trailers.

Due to George Lucas's financially crippling divorce, he was forced to sell off Lucasfilm Computer Graphics, by this time renamed the Pixar Graphics Group, founded by Smith and Catmull, with Lasseter as one of the founding employees. It was spun off as a separate corporation with Apple co-founder Steve Jobs as its majority shareholder in 1986. Over the next 10 years, Pixar evolved from a computer company that did animation work on the side into an animation studio. Lasseter oversaw all of Pixar's films and associated projects as executive producer. As well as Toy Story, he also personally directed A Bug's Life (1998), the former's sequel Toy Story 2 (1999), Cars (2006), and its sequel Cars 2 (2011).

He has won two Academy Awards, for Animated Short Film (Tin Toy), as well as a Special Achievement Award (Toy Story). Lasseter has been nominated on four other occasions—in the category of Animated Feature, for both Monsters, Inc. (2001) and Cars, in the Original Screenplay category for Toy Story and in the Animated Short category for Luxo, Jr. (1986)—while the short Knick Knack (1989) was selected by Terry Gilliam as one of the ten best animated films of all time. In 2008, he was honored with the Winsor McCay Award, the lifetime achievement award for animators.

=== Return to Disney ===
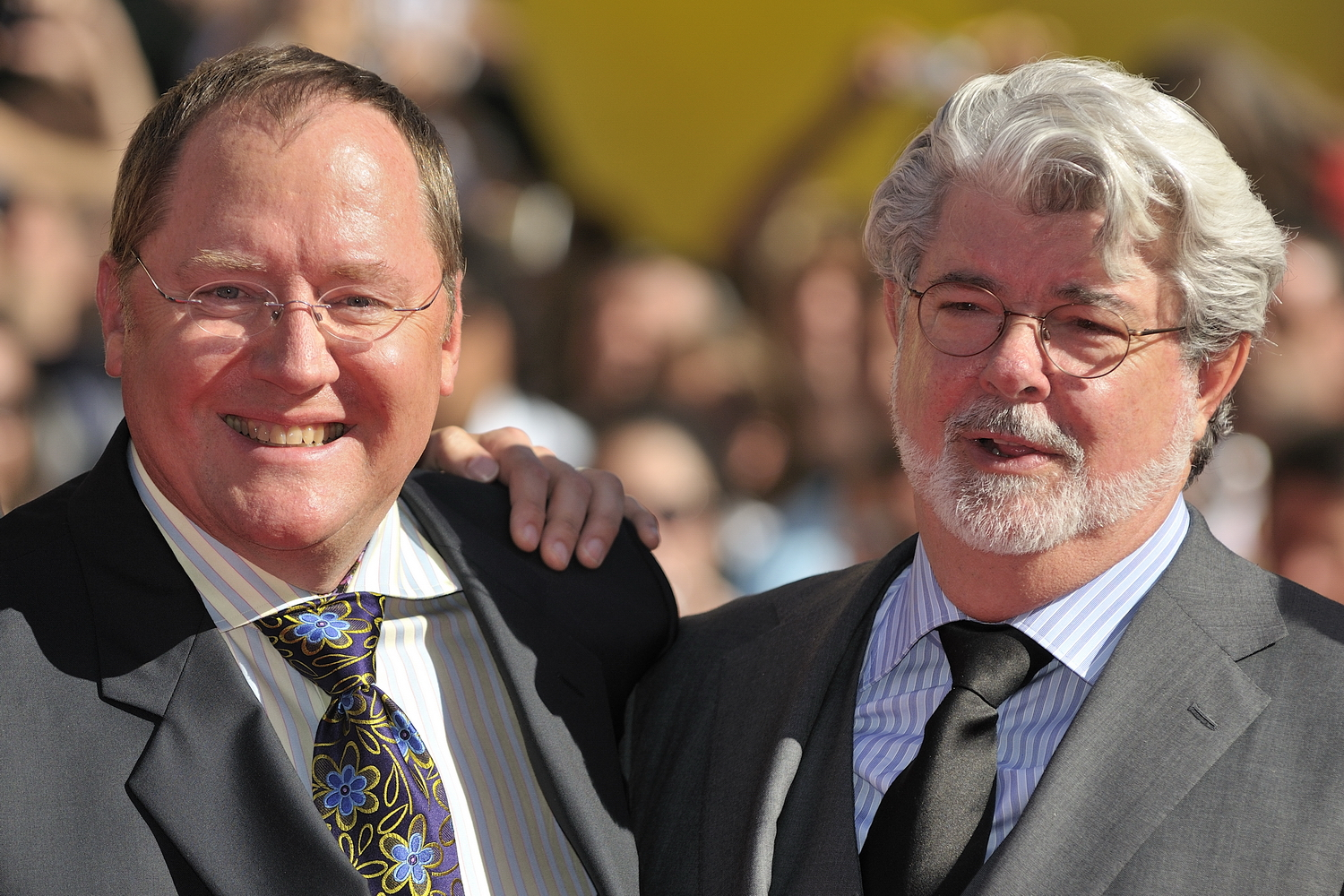
Lasseter with George Lucas at the Venice Film Festival in 2009

Disney announced that it would be purchasing Pixar in January 2006, and Lasseter was named the chief creative officer of both Pixar and Walt Disney Feature Animation, the latter of which he renamed Walt Disney Animation Studios. Lasseter was also named principal creative adviser at Walt Disney Imagineering, where he helped design attractions for Disney Parks. He oversaw all of Walt Disney Animation Studios' films and associated projects as executive producer. He reported directly to Disney Chairman and CEO Bob Iger, bypassing Disney's studio and theme park executives. He also received green-light power on films with Roy E. Disney's consent.

In December 2006, Lasseter announced that Disney Animation would start producing animated shorts – 2D, CGI, or a combination of both – that would be released theatrically. Lasseter said he sees this medium as an excellent way to train and discover new talent in the company as well as a testing ground for new techniques and ideas.

In June 2007, Catmull and Lasseter were given control of Disneytoon Studios, a division of Walt Disney Animation Studios housed in a separate facility in Glendale. As president and chief creative officer, respectively, they have supervised three separate studios for Disney, each with its own production pipeline: Pixar, Disney Animation, and Disneytoon. While Disney Animation and Disneytoon are located in the Los Angeles area, Pixar is located over 350 miles (563 kilometers) northwest in the Bay Area, where Catmull and Lasseter both live. Accordingly, they appointed a general manager for each studio to manage day-to-day business affairs, then established a routine of spending at least two days per week (usually Tuesdays and Wednesdays) in Southern California. When he took official control over DisneyToon Studios, he ordered almost all of the DisneyToon Studios direct-to-video animated cartoon full-length sequel feature films to the Walt Disney Animation Studios feature films cancelled such as Snow White and the Seven Dwarfs, Pinocchio, Dumbo, The Aristocats, Meet the Robinsons, and others, and instead ordered it to refocus on creating spin-offs such as Disney Fairies Tinker Bell films series and then later the, Disney Planes animated films.

Lasseter is a close friend and admirer of Japanese animator Hayao Miyazaki. He was introduced to Miyazaki's work in 1981, when TMS Entertainment sent a delegation of animators to the Disney studio and played a clip from Miyazaki's first feature film, The Castle of Cagliostro (1979). Lasseter was so deeply moved that in 1985 he insisted on showing that clip and other examples of Miyazaki's work after dinner to a woman he had just met (who would become his wife). He personally met Miyazaki during his first trip to Japan in 1987, and saw early drawings for My Neighbor Totoro (1988). After Lasseter became a successful director and producer at Pixar, he went on to serve as executive producer on several of Miyazaki's films for their release in the United States, and oversaw the translation and dubbing of their English language soundtracks. In addition, the forest spirit Totoro from My Neighbor Totoro makes an appearance as a plush toy in Toy Story 3 (2010).

Lasseter is a member of the Academy of Motion Picture Arts and Sciences and served nine consecutive years on its board of governors from 2005 to 2014 when he had to relinquish his seat due to term limits. His last position on the board was as first vice president.

Lasseter received a star on the Hollywood Walk of Fame in Hollywood in 2011, located at 6834 Hollywood Boulevard.

=== Allegations of sexual misconduct and exit from Disney and Pixar ===
In November 2017, Lasseter took a six-month leave of absence when allegations surfaced that he had made interactions with employees that made them uncomfortable, which he apologized for and acknowledged as missteps. The alleged sexual misconduct toward multiple employees over a number of years included "grabbing, kissing, [and] making comments about physical attributes". The behavior was alleged to have been so well known that, according to Variety, at various times, Pixar had "minders who were tasked with reining in his impulses". Lasseter addressed the allegations in a memo to staff, stating, "It's been brought to my attention that I have made some of you feel disrespected or uncomfortable. That was never my intent. Collectively, you mean the world to me, and I deeply apologize if I have let you down." Lasseter went on in the memo to emphasize his commitment to fixing his missteps and his hope to return to working with them in the new year.

In June 2018, Disney, Pixar, and Lasseter announced that he would be leaving the company at the end of the year, taking a consulting role until then.

=== Skydance Animation ===
On January 9, 2019, Lasseter was hired to head Skydance Animation, a new animation division of Skydance Media formed in 2017. In a statement, Lasseter said "I have spent the last year away from the industry in deep reflection, learning how my actions unintentionally made colleagues uncomfortable, which I deeply regret and apologize for. It has been humbling, but I believe it will make me a better leader." An investigation conducted prior to his hiring found that no previous claims of sexual assault, propositioning or harassment had been filed against Lasseter, and "[...] there were no findings of secret settlements by Disney or Lasseter to any parties asking for a settlement."

At Skydance Animation, Lasseter serves as producer on all feature films and executive producer on all series, along with Skydance Media CEO David Ellison. In January 2021, the studio entered into a multiyear partnership with Apple TV, then entered into a multiyear distribution deal with Netflix in October 2023. Under Lasseter's leadership, the studio first released the short film, Blush (2021), followed by their first feature film, Luck (2022), and the Emmy Award-winning series, WondLa (2024–2025), all for Apple TV. Lasseter also oversaw the films Spellbound (2024) and Swapped (2026), to be followed by Ray Gunn (2026) and an untitled Jack and the Beanstalk project, all for Netflix. In September 2026, Lasseter was revealed as the director of a new film, Cosmic Motors, set to be released by Paramount Pictures as the studio's first wide theatrically released film following their distribution deals with Apple TV and Netflix.

== Personal life ==
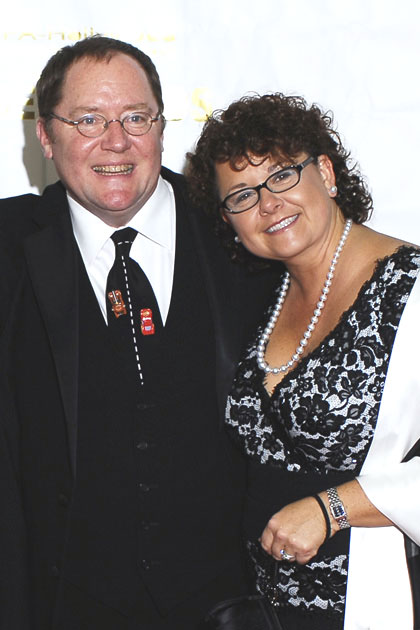
Lasseter with his wife Nancy at the 2006 Annie Awards red carpet at the Alex Theatre in Glendale, California

Lasseter lives in Glen Ellen, California, with his wife Nancy, a graduate of Carnegie Mellon University, whom he met at a computer graphics conference in San Francisco in 1985. Nancy majored in computer graphics applications, and previously worked as a computer graphics engineer at Apple Computer. They married in 1988, and have four sons together in addition to Nancy's son from a previous relationship, born between 1979 or 1980 and 1997.

The Lasseters own Lasseter Family Winery in Glen Ellen, California. The property includes a narrow gauge railroad named the Justi Creek Railway, which is approximately 2 miles (3.2 km) long, including a train station and water tower Lasseter purchased from former Disney animator Ward Kimball. Their residence has a swimming pool with a lazy river that runs through a cave. Lasseter collects classic cars, such as a black 1952 Jaguar XK120.

On May 2, 2009, Lasseter received an honorary doctorate from Pepperdine University, where he delivered the commencement address.

His influences include Walt Disney, Chuck Jones, Frank Capra, Hayao Miyazaki, and Preston Sturges. Lasseter's favorite film is Walt Disney's Dumbo (1941).

== Filmography ==
Key
†	Denotes films that have not yet been released

=== Films ===
Year	Film	Credited as					
Year	Film	Director	(Original) Story by	Producer	Other	Voice	Notes
1981	The Fox and the Hound	No	No	No	Yes		Animator - uncredited
1985	Young Sherlock Holmes	No	No	No	Yes		Computer Animation: Industrial Light & Magic (ILM)
1995	Toy Story	Yes	Yes	No	Yes	Commercial Chorus 1	Modeling and Animation System Development
1998	A Bug's Life	Yes	Yes	No	Yes	Harry; Singing Grasshopper 1	
1999	Toy Story 2	Yes	Yes	No	Yes	Blue Bomber	
2001	Monsters, Inc.	No	No	Executive	No		
2002	Spirited Away	No	No	Executive	No		US Version
2003	Finding Nemo	No	No	Executive	No		
2004	The Incredibles	No	No	Executive	No		
2005	Howl's Moving Castle	No	No	Executive	No		US Version
2005	Porco Rosso	No	No	No	Yes		Executive Creative Consultant: 2005 US Version
2006	Cars	Yes	Yes	No	Yes		Screenplay
2006	Tales from Earthsea	No	No	Executive	No		US Version
2007	Meet the Robinsons	No	No	Executive	No		
2007	Ratatouille	No	No	Executive	Yes		Executive Team
2008	WALL-E	No	No	Executive	Yes		Pixar Senior Creative Team
2008	Tinker Bell	No	No	Executive	No		
2008	Bolt	No	No	Executive	No		
2009	Up	No	No	Executive	Yes		Pixar Senior Creative Team
2009	Ponyo	No	No	Executive	Yes		Director: English Dub, US Version
2009	Tinker Bell and the Lost Treasure	No	No	Executive	No		
2009	The Princess and the Frog	No	No	Executive	No		
2010	Toy Story 3	No	Yes	Executive	Yes		Pixar Senior Creative Team
2010	Tinker Bell and the Great Fairy Rescue	No	No	Executive	No		
2010	Tangled	No	No	Executive	Yes		Studio Leadership
2011	Winnie the Pooh	No	No	Executive	Yes		Studio Leadership
2011	Cars 2	Yes	Yes	No	Yes	Galloping Geargrinder; John Lassetire; Fuzzy Dice Casino Car	Pixar Senior Creative Team
2011	The Lion King	No	No	Executive	No		3D Version
2011	Beauty and the Beast	No	No	Executive	No		3D Version
2012	Brave	No	No	Executive	Yes		Pixar Senior Creative Team
2012	Secret of the Wings	No	No	Executive	No		
2012	Wreck-It Ralph	No	No	Executive	Yes		Studio Leadership
2013	Monsters University	No	No	Executive	Yes		Pixar Senior Creative Team
2013	Planes	No	Yes	Executive	No		
2013	The Little Mermaid	No	No	Executive	No		3D Version
2013	Frozen	No	No	Executive	Yes		Studio Leadership
2014	The Pirate Fairy	No	Yes	Executive	No		
2014	Planes: Fire & Rescue	No	No	Executive	No		
2014	Big Hero 6	No	No	Executive	Yes		Studio Leadership
2014	Tinker Bell and the Legend of the NeverBeast	No	No	Executive	No		
2015	Inside Out	No	No	Executive	Yes		Pixar Senior Creative Team
2015	The Good Dinosaur	No	No	Executive	Yes		Pixar Senior Creative Team
2016	Zootopia	No	No	Executive	Yes		Studio Leadership
2016	Finding Dory	No	No	Executive	Yes		Pixar Senior Creative Team
2016	Moana	No	No	Executive	Yes		Studio Leadership
2017	Cars 3	No	No	Executive	Yes		Pixar Senior Creative Team
2017	Coco	No	No	Executive	Yes		Pixar Senior Creative Team
2018	Incredibles 2	No	No	Executive	Yes		Pixar Senior Creative Team
2018	Ralph Breaks the Internet	No	No	Executive	Yes		Studio Leadership - uncredited
2019	Toy Story 4	Removed	Yes	No	No		
2022	Luck	No	No	Yes	No		
2024	Spellbound	No	No	Yes	Yes		Additional Literary Materials
2026	Swapped	No	No	Yes	Yes		Additional Literary Materials
2026	Ray Gunn	No	No	Yes	No		
TBA	Untitled Skydance Animation Jack and the Beanstalk/Rich Moore project †	No	No	Yes	No		
TBA	Cosmic Motors †	Yes	TBA	TBA	TBA		

=== Shorts ===
Year	Film	Credited as						
Year	Film	Director	(Original) Story by	Producer	Animator	Modeler	Other	Notes
1979	Lady and the Lamp	Yes	Yes	Yes	Yes	No	No	Student Films; Producer
1980	Nitemare	Yes	Yes	Yes	Yes	No	No	Student Films; Producer
1983	Mickey's Christmas Carol	No	No	No	No	No	Yes	Creative Talent
1984	The Adventures of André & Wally B.	No	No	No	Yes	Yes	Yes	Character Designer
1986	Luxo Jr.	Yes	Yes	Yes	Yes	Yes	Yes	Designer
1987	Red's Dream	Yes	Yes	No	Yes	Yes	No	
1988	Tin Toy	Yes	Yes	No	Yes	Yes	No	
1989	Knick Knack	Yes	Yes	No	Yes	Yes	No	
1991	Light & Heavy	Yes	No	No	Yes	No	No	Appears in Sesame Street.
1997	Geri's Game	No	No	Executive	No	No	No	
1998	It's Tough to Be a Bug!	No	No	Executive	No	No	No	Theme park film
2000	For the Birds	No	No	Executive	No	No	No	
2002	Mike's New Car	No	No	Executive	No	No	No	
2003	Exploring the Reef	No	No	Executive	No	No	No	
2003	Boundin'	No	No	Executive	No	No	No	
2005	Jack-Jack Attack	No	No	Executive	No	No	No	
2005	One Man Band	No	No	Executive	No	No	No	
2006	Mater and the Ghostlight	Yes	Yes	No	No	No	No	
2006	Lifted	No	No	Executive	No	No	No	
2007	Your Friend the Rat	No	No	Executive	No	No	No	
2007	How to Hook Up Your Home Theater	No	No	Executive	No	No	No	
2008	Presto	No	No	Executive	No	No	No	
2008	Glago's Guest	No	No	Executive	No	No	No	
2008	BURN-E	No	No	Executive	No	No	No	
2008–14	Cars Toons	Yes	Yes	Executive	No	No	No	
2009	Super Rhino	No	No	Executive	No	No	No	
2009	Partly Cloudy	No	No	Executive	No	No	No	
2009	Dug's Special Mission	No	No	Executive	No	No	No	
2010	Day & Night	No	No	Executive	No	No	No	
2010	Tick Tock Tale	No	No	Executive	No	No	No	
2010	Prep & Landing: Operation: Secret Santa	No	No	Executive	No	No	No	TV short film
2011	The Ballad of Nessie	No	No	Executive	No	No	No	
2011	Toy Story Toons: Hawaiian Vacation	No	No	Executive	No	No	No	
2011	La Luna	No	No	Executive	No	No	No	
2011	Toy Story Toons: Small Fry	No	Yes	Executive	No	No	No	
2012	Tangled Ever After	No	No	Executive	No	No	No	
2012	Toy Story Toons: Partysaurus Rex	No	Yes	Executive	No	No	No	
2012	Paperman	No	No	Executive	No	No	No	
2012	The Legend of Mor'du	No	No	Executive	No	No	No	
2013	The Blue Umbrella	No	No	Executive	No	No	No	
2013	Party Central	No	No	Executive	No	No	No	
2013	Pixie Hollow Bake Off	No	No	Executive	No	No	No	TV short film
2013	Get a Horse!	No	No	Executive	No	No	No	
2014	Lava	No	No	Executive	No	No	No	
2014	Vitaminamulch: Air Spectacular	No	No	Executive	No	No	No	
2014	Feast	No	No	Executive	No	No	No	
2015	Frozen Fever	No	No	Executive	No	No	No	
2015	Riley's First Date?	No	No	Executive	No	No	No	
2015	Sanjay's Super Team	No	No	Executive	No	No	No	
2016	Piper	No	No	Executive	No	No	No	
2016	Inner Workings	No	No	Executive	No	No	No	
2017	Gone Fishing	No	No	Executive	No	No	No	
2017	Lou	No	No	Executive	No	No	No	
2017	Miss Fritter's Racing Skoool	No	No	Executive	No	No	No	
2017	Olaf's Frozen Adventure	No	No	Executive	No	No	No	Featurette
2018	Bao	No	No	Executive	No	No	No	
2021	Blush	No	No	Executive	No	No	Yes	Logo and End Credit Designer
2023	Bad Luck Spot!	No	No	Executive	No	No	No	
2025	Flink's Pigeon Problems: A Magical Rescue	No	No	Yes	No	No	No	

=== TV specials ===
Year	Title	Executive Producer	Premiered on
2009	Prep & Landing	Yes	ABC
2011	Pixie Hollow Games	Yes	Disney Channel
2011	Prep & Landing: Naughty vs. Nice	Yes	ABC
2013	Toy Story of Terror!	Yes	ABC
2014	Toy Story That Time Forgot	Yes	ABC

=== Long-form limited streaming series ===
Year	Season	Episodes	Title	Executive Producer	Network
2024-2025	1	20	WondLa	Yes	Apple TV+
2024-2025	2	20	WondLa	Yes	Apple TV+
2024-2025	3	20	WondLa	Yes	Apple TV

=== Documentaries ===
Year	Title	Role	Notes
1999	The Hand Behind the Mouse: The Ub Iwerks Story	Himself	
2001	Walt: The Man Behind the Myth	Himself	Grateful Acknowledgement
2007	Fog City Mavericks	Himself	Special Thanks
2007	The Pixar Story	Himself	Very Special Thanks
2007	Mr. Warmth: The Don Rickles Project	Himself	Special Thanks
2009	The Boys: The Sherman Brothers' Story	Himself	
2009	Waking Sleeping Beauty	Himself	
2010	America: The Story of Us	Himself	Television Docuseries
2010	Industrial, Light & Magic: Creating the Impossible	Himself	Television Special
2011	These Amazing Shadows	Himself	
2011	Ray Harryhausen: Special Effects Titan	Himself	
2013	Inside Pixar	Himself	Television Special
2014	The Story of Frozen: Making a Disney Animated Classic	Himself	Television Special
2015	Winning: The Racing Life of Paul Newman	Himself	
2015	A Grand Night In: The Story of Aardman	Himself	
2016	Imagining Zootopia	Himself	Special Thanks
2019	The Imagineering Story	Himself	Disney+ Original Docuseries

=== Music video ===
Year	Title	Role	Note
2005	"When I Get Where I'm Going"	Himself (uncredited)	Music video by Brad Paisley and Dolly Parton

=== Other credits ===
Year	Title	Credit
1996	La Salla	Special Thanks
2009	Calendar Confloption	Special Thanks
2012	John Carter	Thanks
2012	Firefly and the Coffee Machine	Special Thanks
2015	Stealth	Special Thanks (with Nancy Lasseter)
2017	Ventana	Special Thanks
2021	The Ultimate Playlist of Noise	Special Thanks (with Nancy Lasseter)
2022	Lightyear	Additional Thanks

== Reception ==
Critical, public and commercial reception to films Lasseter has directed as of August 9, 2022.

Film	Rotten Tomatoes	Metacritic	CinemaScore	Budget	Box office
Toy Story	100% (96 reviews)	95 (26 reviews)	A	$30 million	$374.4 million
A Bug's Life	92% (90 reviews)	77 (23 reviews)	A	$120 million	$363.3 million
Toy Story 2	100% (171 reviews)	88 (34 reviews)	A+	$90 million	$511.3 million
Cars	75% (200 reviews)	73 (39 reviews)	A	$120 million	$461.9 million
Cars 2	40% (216 reviews)	57 (38 reviews)	A−	$200 million	$559.8 million

== See also ==
- A113
- List of Pixar films
- List of Pixar shorts
- List of celebrities who own wineries and vineyards
