= Lifted (2006 film) =

- Official poster
- Directed by: Gary Rydstrom
- Written by: Gary Rydstrom
- Story by: Jeff Pidgeon; Max Brace
- Produced by: Katherine Sarafian
- Edited by: Steve Bloom
- Music by: Michael Giacchino
- Production company: Pixar Animation Studios
- Distributed by: Buena Vista Pictures Distribution (Note: Distributed by Buena Vista Pictures Distribution through the Walt Disney Pictures banner.)
- Release dates: October 12, 2006 (Chicago International Film Festival); June 29, 2007 (with Ratatouille)
- Running time: 5 minutes
- Country: United States

Lifted is a 2006 American animated science fiction short film written and directed by Gary Rydstrom and produced by Pixar Animation Studios. This is the directorial debut of Rydstrom, a Academy Award-winning sound designer, editor and mixer, and the first produced by Katherine Sarafian, who went on to produce Pixar's Brave released in 2012.

Inspired by Metropolis (1927), the short debuted on October 12, 2006 at the 42nd Chicago International Film Festival at Columbia College, and was released theatrically with Pixar's Ratatouille on June 29, 2007.

== Plot ==
A young green alien named Stu is taking an alien abduction test inside a spacecraft. He must snatch a sleeping farmer named Ernie under the supervision of his examiner, Mr. B. Stu is expected to use thousands of identical, unlabeled toggle switches, Mr. B’s neutral expression gives him no hints of which ones to use.

Stu's hesitant attempts to operate the switches cause Ernie to bump into walls without waking up. As Stu loses patience, he goes crazy by randomly swiping the switch rows, causing Ernie to bounce around his bedroom like a pinball, knocking over numerous items but remaining asleep. Eventually, Stu finds the switch that will maneuver Ernie out a half open window that he briefly gets stuck in along with the tree nearby. But as Ernie gets into the ship, Stu deactivates the tractor beam before the cargo hatch closes, making Ernie fall to the ground until Mr. B turns the tractor beam back on. Stu tries to join him but Mr. B pushes him aside and takes over, putting Ernie back into bed and cleaning up the mess that Stu made.

Dejected over his failure, Stu begins to shed tears. With a sigh, Mr. B allows him to pilot the ship back home. Stu cheerfully grabs the steering yoke and begins to steer, only to land the ship onto Ernie's house and destroy it. The ship departs, leaving behind a large crater and a lone pillar of earth with Ernie still asleep on top. During the credits, Ernie is heard waking up and then screaming as he falls into the crater.

== Production ==
Production on the film began in mid-2005 and was completed in the summer of 2006. The short was inspired by Gary Rydstrom's own experiences as a sound mixer, and how uncomfortable and difficult it is to operate the large, complex piece of equipment when there are lots of people watching and taking notes. There were no large technological advances used in Lifted, only the use of a new program called Jiggle. This program gives the animators a way to resonate, or jiggle, certain parts of a body. The animator can control how far out to resonate, such as only within a limb, or to stay away from specific parts of the body such as the face.

== Awards ==
Lifted was nominated for Best Animated Short Film on January 23, 2007 for the 79th Academy Awards. It was also included in the Animation Show of Shows in 2006.

== Home media ==
Walt Disney Studios Home Entertainment included the film on the Blu-ray and DVD release of Ratatouille and as part of Pixar Short Films Collection, Volume 1 in 2007.

== See also ==
- Metropolis – Is inspired by the Sci-Fi movie released in 1927.
- List of science fiction films of the 2000s
