= Washington D.C. Area Film Critics Association Awards 2021 =

Annual US film awards ceremony

20th WAFCA Awards
- Date: December 6, 2021

Highlights
- Best Film: Belfast
- Best Director: Jane Campion – The Power of the Dog
- Best Actor: Andrew Garfield – tick, tick... BOOM!
- Best Actress: Kristen Stewart – Spencer

The 20th Washington D.C. Area Film Critics Association Awards were announced on December 6, 2021. The nominations were announced on December 4, 2021. Belfast and The Power of the Dog led the nominations with 11 each, with the former winning Best Film.

== Winners and nominees ==
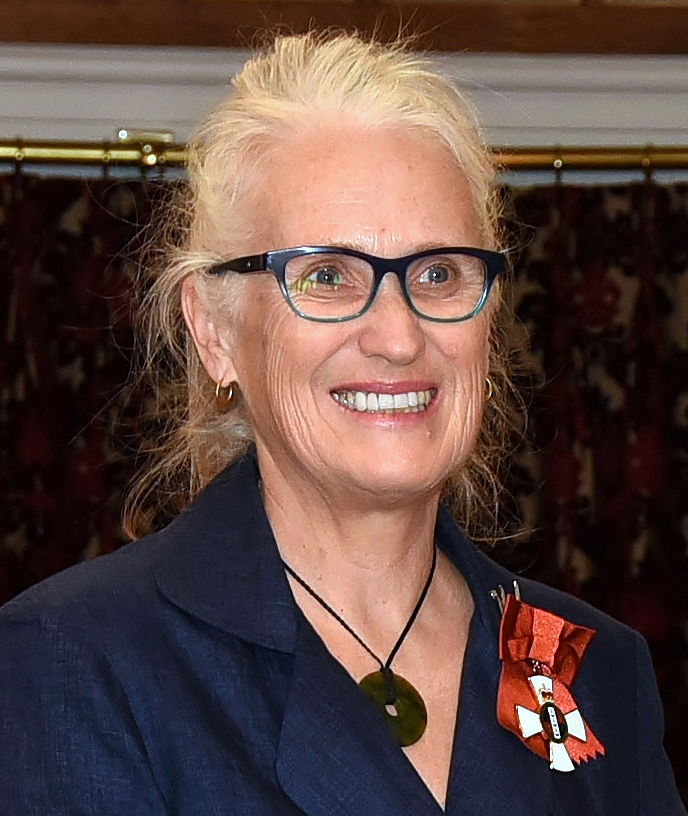
Jane Campion, Best Director and Best Adapted Screenplay winner

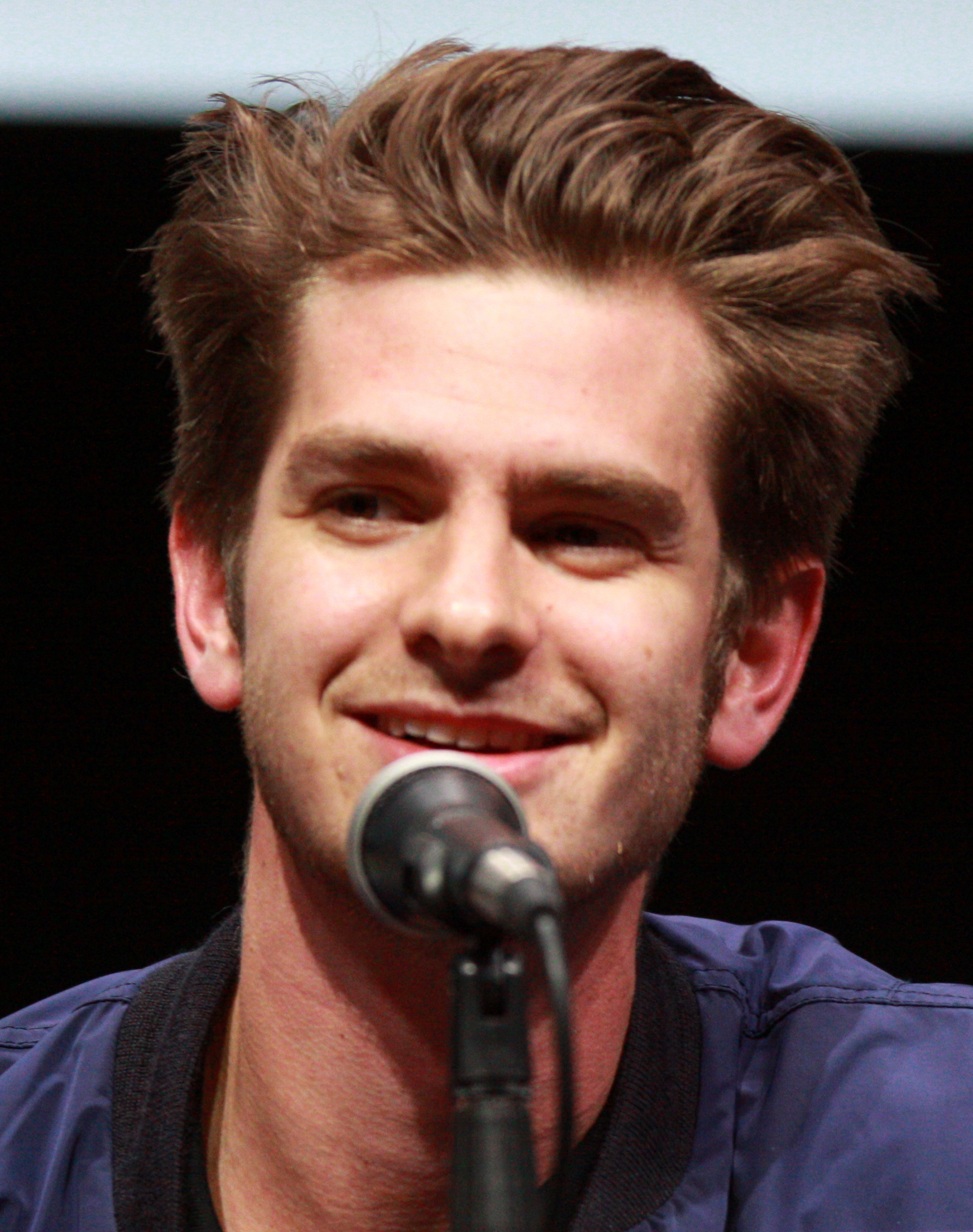
Andrew Garfield, Best Actor winner

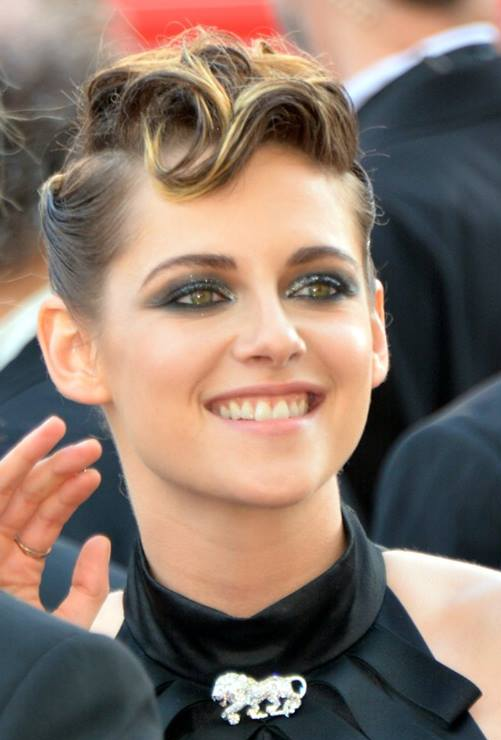
Kristen Stewart, Best Actress winner

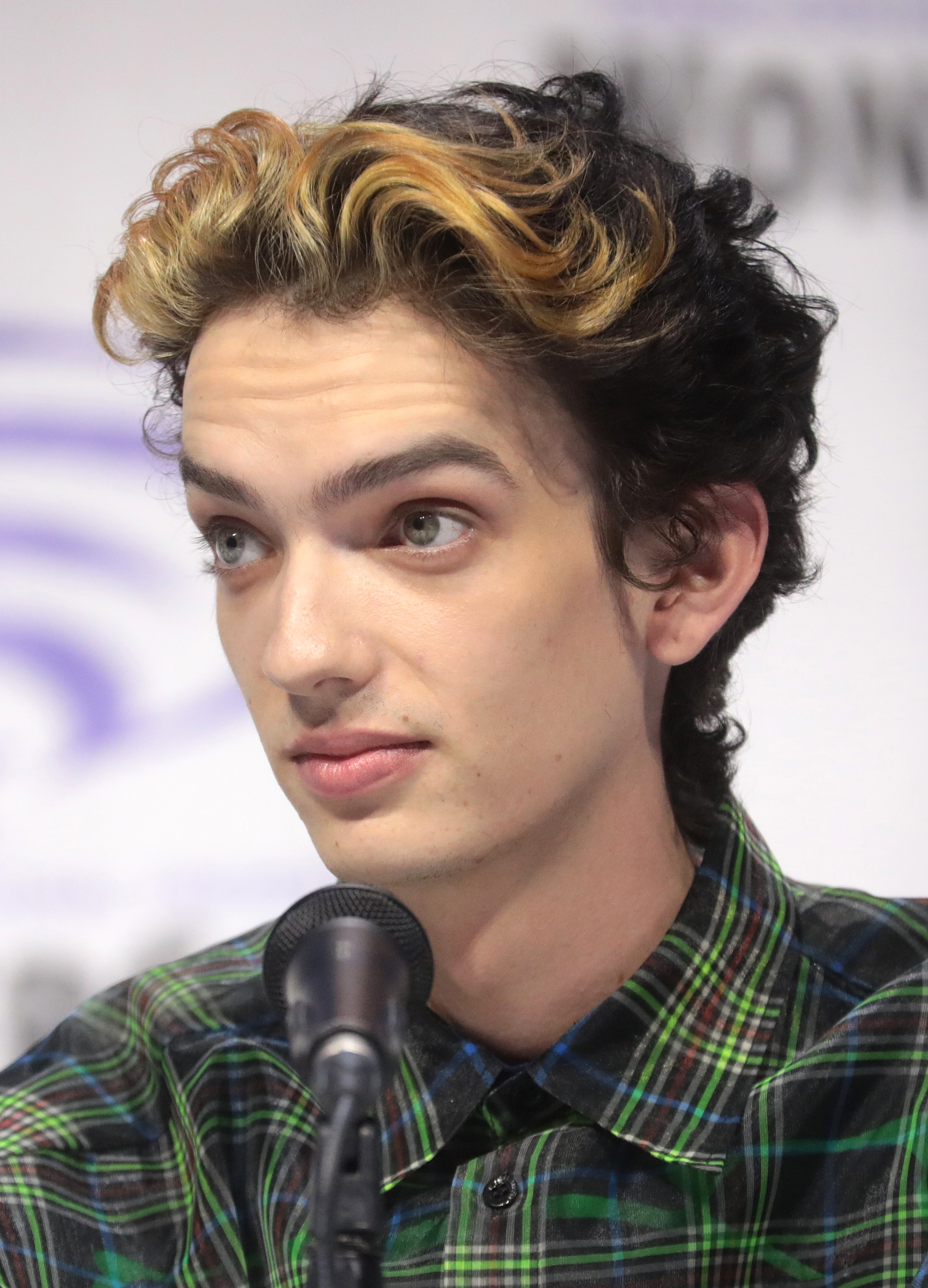
Kodi Smit-McPhee, Best Supporting Actor winner

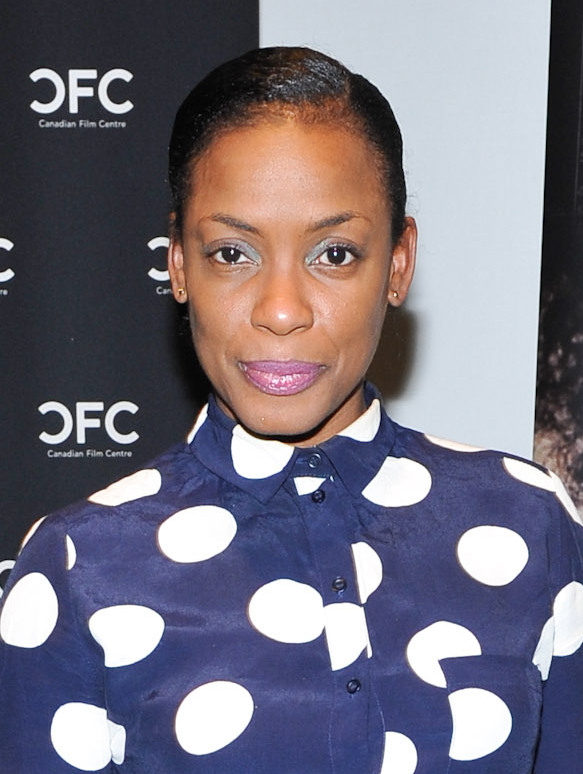
Aunjanue Ellis-Taylor, Best Supporting Actress winner

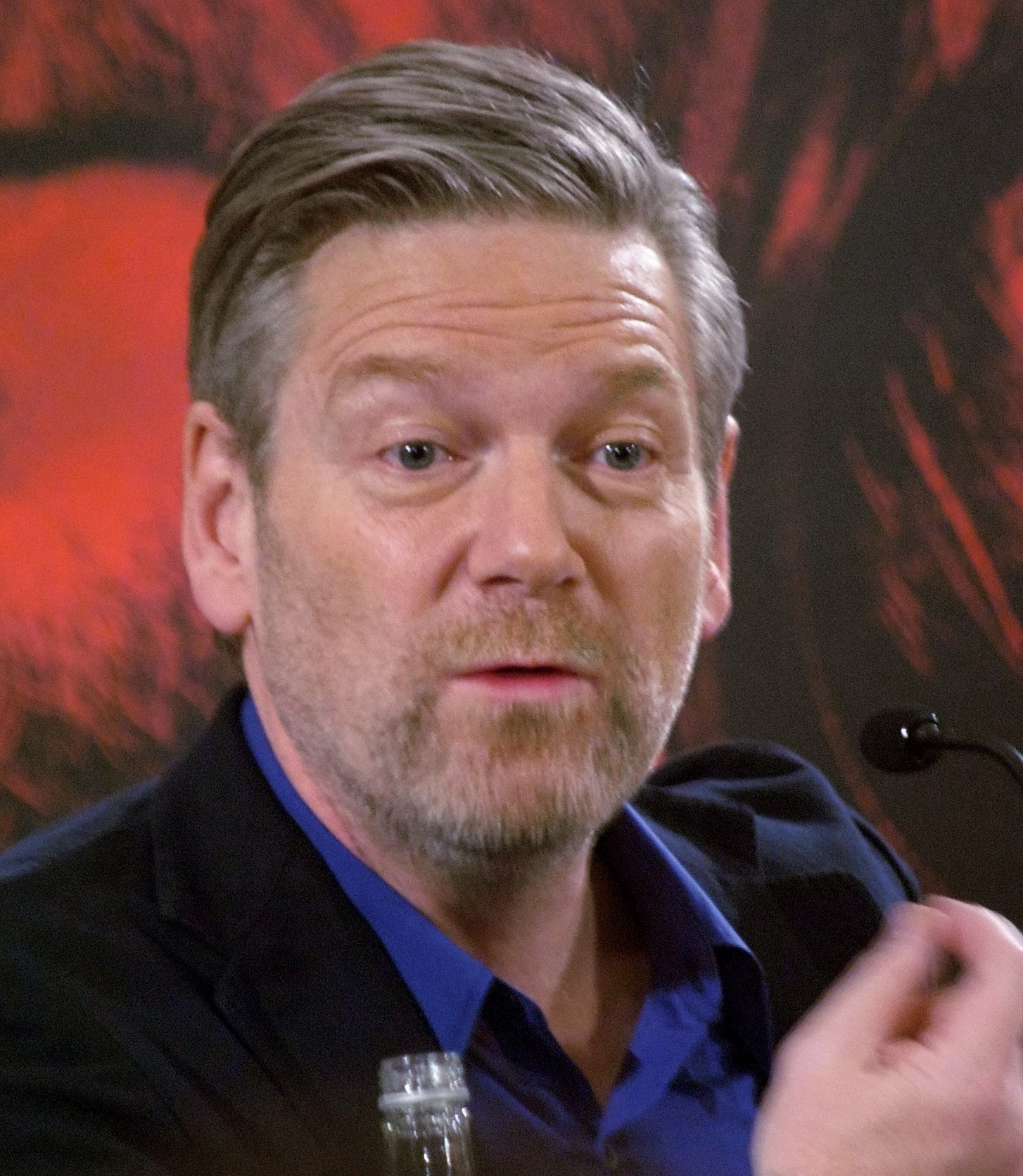
Kenneth Branagh, Best Original Screenplay winner

Best Film	Best Director
Belfast: The Green Knight; The Power of the Dog; tick, tick... BOOM!; West Side Story	Jane Campion – The Power of the Dog: Kenneth Branagh – Belfast; David Lowery – The Green Knight; Steven Spielberg – West Side Story; Denis Villeneuve – Dune
Best Actor	Best Actress
Andrew Garfield – tick, tick... BOOM! as Jonathan Larson: Nicolas Cage – Pig as Robin Feld; Benedict Cumberbatch – The Power of the Dog as Phil Burbank; Will Smith – King Richard as Richard Williams; Denzel Washington – The Tragedy of Macbeth as Lord Macbeth	Kristen Stewart – Spencer as Diana, Princess of Wales: Olivia Colman – The Lost Daughter as Leda Caruso; Lady Gaga – House of Gucci as Patrizia Reggiani; Nicole Kidman – Being the Ricardos as Lucille Ball; Tessa Thompson – Passing as Irene Redfield
Best Supporting Actor	Best Supporting Actress
Kodi Smit-McPhee – The Power of the Dog as Peter Gordon: Jamie Dornan – Belfast as Pa; Ciarán Hinds – Belfast as Pop; Troy Kotsur – CODA as Frank Rossi; Jesse Plemons – The Power of the Dog as George Burbank	Aunjanue Ellis-Taylor – King Richard as Oracene "Brandy" Price: Caitríona Balfe – Belfast as Ma; Ariana DeBose – West Side Story as Anita; Ann Dowd – Mass as Linda; Kirsten Dunst – The Power of the Dog as Rose Gordon
Best Original Screenplay	Best Adapted Screenplay
Belfast – Kenneth Branagh: C'mon C'mon – Mike Mills; King Richard – Zach Baylin; Licorice Pizza – Paul Thomas Anderson; Mass – Fran Kranz	The Power of the Dog – Jane Campion: CODA – Sian Heder; Dune – Eric Roth, Jon Spaihts, and Denis Villeneuve; tick, tick... BOOM! – Steven Levenson; West Side Story – Tony Kushner
Best Animated Feature	Best Documentary
The Mitchells vs. the Machines: Encanto; Flee; Luca; Raya and the Last Dragon	Summer of Soul (...Or, When the Revolution Could Not Be Televised): The First Wave; Flee; The Rescue; Val
Best International/Foreign Language Film	Best Cinematography
Drive My Car: A Hero; Lamb; Titane; The Worst Person in the World	Dune – Greig Fraser: Belfast – Haris Zambarloukos; The Green Knight – Andrew Droz Palermo; The Power of the Dog – Ari Wegner; The Tragedy of Macbeth – Bruno Delbonnel
Best Editing	Best Original Score
tick, tick... BOOM! – Myron Kerstein and Andrew Weisblum: Belfast – Úna Ní Dhonghaíle; Dune – Joe Walker; The French Dispatch – Andrew Weisblum; The Power of the Dog – Peter Sciberras	Dune – Hans Zimmer: Cyrano – Aaron Dessner and Bryce Dessner; The French Dispatch – Alexandre Desplat; The Power of the Dog – Jonny Greenwood; Spencer – Jonny Greenwood
Best Production Design	Best Acting Ensemble
Dune – Patrice Vermette (production designer); Richard Roberts and Zsuzsanna Sipos (set decorators): Belfast – Jim Clay (production designer); Claire Nia Richards (set decorator); The French Dispatch – Adam Stockhausen (production designer); Rena DeAngelo (set decorator); Nightmare Alley – Tamara Deverell (production designer); Shane Vieau (set decorator); West Side Story – Adam Stockhausen (production designer); Rena DeAngelo (set decorator)	Mass: Belfast; The French Dispatch; The Harder They Fall; The Power of the Dog
Best Youth Performance	Best Voice Performance
Woody Norman – C'mon C'mon as Jesse: Jude Hill – Belfast as Buddy; Emilia Jones – CODA as Ruby Rossi; Saniyya Sidney – King Richard as Venus Williams; Rachel Zegler – West Side Story as María Vasquez	Awkwafina – Raya and the Last Dragon as Sisu: Stephanie Beatriz – Encanto as Mirabel Madrigal; Abbi Jacobson – The Mitchells vs. the Machines as Katie Mitchell; Kelly Marie Tran – Raya and the Last Dragon as Raya; Jacob Tremblay – Luca as Luca Parugo

== Multiple nominations and wins ==
The following films received multiple nominations:

Nominations	Film
11	Belfast
11	The Power of the Dog
6	Dune
6	West Side Story
4	The French Dispatch
4	King Richard
4	tick, tick... BOOM!
3	CODA
3	The Green Knight
3	Mass
3	Raya and the Last Dragon
2	C'mon C'mon
2	Encanto
2	Flee
2	Luca
2	The Mitchells vs. the Machines
2	Spencer
2	The Tragedy of Macbeth

The following films received multiple awards:

Wins	Film
3	Dune
3	The Power of the Dog
2	Belfast
2	tick, tick... BOOM!
