= Baobab (disambiguation) =

A baobab is a genus of trees, Adonsia.

Baobab may also refer to:

== Film studios ==
- Baobab Films, film production company founded by Senegalese filmmaker Ababacar Samb Makharam
- Baobab Studios, American independent animation studio

== Other uses ==
- Baobab College, a school in Lusaka, Zambia
- Disk Usage Analyzer, previously called "Baobab"
- The Golden Baobab Prize, a literary prize awarded annually to African writers
- Orchestra Baobab, a Senegalese band
- Production Baobab, a Japanese talent agency for voice actors
- Order of the Baobab, a South African civilian national honour
