= Bud Luckey =

American cartoonist (1934–2018)

- Luckey in a 2004 interview feature during the promotion of his Oscar-nominated short film, Boundin'
- Born: William Everett Luckey; July 28, 1934; Billings, Montana, U.S.
- Died: February 24, 2018 (aged 83); Newtown, Connecticut, U.S.
- Resting place: Yellowstone Valley Memorial Park, Billings, Montana, U.S.
- Education: University of Southern California
- Occupations: Animator; artist; cartoonist; character designer; composer; director; illustrator; musician; singer; songwriter; voice actor
- Years active: 1961–2014
- Employer: Pixar Animation Studios (1992–2014)
- Children: Andy Luckey
- Awards: Annie Award (2004); Clio Award (1966)
- Military career
- Allegiance: United States
- Branch: United States Air Force
- Service years: 1953–1957
- Rank: Sergeant
- Unit: United States Air Force

William Everett "Bud" Luckey (July 28, 1934 – February 24, 2018) was an American animator, artist, cartoonist, character designer, composer, director, illustrator, musician, singer, songwriter, and voice actor. He worked at the animation studio Pixar, where he worked as a character designer on a number of films, including Toy Story, Toy Story 2, A Bug's Life, and Monsters, Inc., while also contributing to Cars and Ratatouille. Also known for his distinctive deep gravelly bass voice, Luckey was known as the voice of Rick Dicker in The Incredibles and its spin-off short Jack-Jack Attack, Chuckles the Clown in Toy Story 3 and the short Hawaiian Vacation, and Eeyore in Winnie the Pooh (2011), as well as its television spin-off series The Mini Adventures of Winnie the Pooh, voicing the character for only 5 episodes.

In 2004, Luckey directed and wrote the Pixar short film Boundin', for which he also composed music and performed as the solo singer and narrator. It won the Annie Award and was nominated for the Academy Award for Best Animated Short Film.

Luckey continued to work as a performer of character voices in both Disney and Pixar films until his retirement in 2014.

== Early life ==
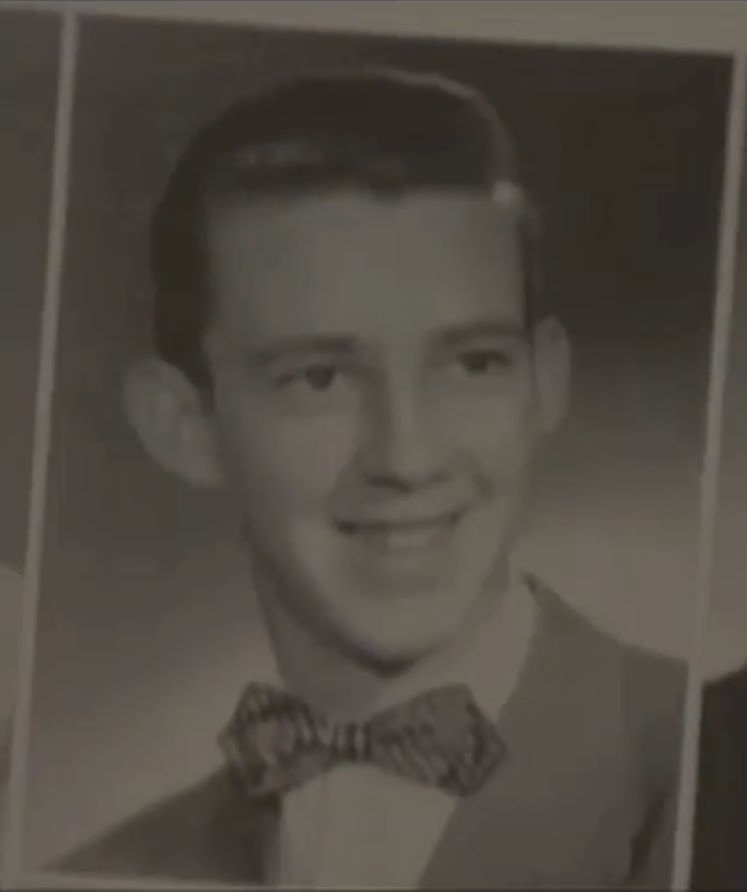
Luckey in his high school yearbook portrait at Billings Senior High School, 1952

William Everett Luckey was born in Billings, Montana on July 28, 1934.

During the Korean War, Luckey served in the United States Air Force. He later served as an Artist-Illustrator (a specialty now called "Visual Information Specialist") with the NATO Allied Occupation Forces in Europe and North Africa from 1953 to 1954 and, finally, with the Strategic Air Command from 1954 to 1957.

Among Luckey's Air Force duty stations was Nouasseur Air Base (also known as Nouasseur Air Depot), a nuclear bomber strike base and nuclear weapon storage depot south of Casablanca, Morocco. There, he served with the Third Air Force Air Material Command, Southern District (now part of the Air Force Materiel Command). Additional duty stations were Lackland AFB and Kelly AFB (now collectively part of Joint Base San Antonio), as well as Portland AFB (now known as Portland Air National Guard Base). Through the mid-1960s, he remained an Air Force reservist.

== Career ==
=== Art school and early career ===
After leaving active Air Force duty and with the benefits of the Korean War G.I. Bill, Luckey attended Chouinard Art Institute (which later merged with the California Academy of Music to form California Institute of the Arts (Cal Arts)) from 1957 to 1960. He was a Disney scholar, and received professional animation training at the University of Southern California with Disney veteran animator Art Babbitt. After graduation, Luckey worked for a time as Babbitt's assistant / apprentice at Quartet Films in Los Angeles.

In 1961, he served as an animator for The Alvin Show. He also worked as an animator and sequence director on a pilot for Mad magazine television special produced by longtime friends Jimmy T. Murakami and Gordon Bellamy. Luckey would later serve as an animator on The Mouse and His Child.

=== Television commercials ===
As an advertising agency Art Director and Producer from 1961 to 1969 at the Guild, Bascom, & Bonfigli (Advertising) Agency (which later merged with Dancer Fitzgerald Sample, now Saatchi & Saatchi, in 1967), Luckey worked on television commercials for Kellogg's Frosted Flakes (Tony the Tiger), Froot Loops (Toucan Sam), and Rice Krispies (Snap, Crackle and Pop), as well as Interstate Bakeries' Dolly Madison products featuring Charles M. Schulz' Peanuts characters. He created the "Bosco Dumbunnies" characters for the Best Foods Chocolate Flavor Milk Amplifier product Bosco Chocolate Syrup – the commercial spots were animated by renowned animators Fred Wolf and Jimmy Murakami. In 1966, Luckey won a Clio Award for the General Mills commercial Betty Crocker – "Magic Faucet".

Luckey also worked with Alex Anderson, who created the characters of Rocky the Flying Squirrel, Bullwinkle, and Dudley Do-Right, as well as the more obscure Crusader Rabbit. Anderson was the Vice President of Television at the Guild-Bascom-Bonfigli Agency at that time.

Despite its San Francisco location, the Guild-Bascom-Bonfigli Agency was also well known for its work on political campaigns. The agency's Creative Director Maxwell "Bud" Arnold was considered a foremost expert in the budding field of television advertising for politics and Arnold's expertise brought many key political figures to the agency's roster. In that regard, Luckey also did work on the presidential campaigns of John F. Kennedy, Robert F. Kennedy, and Hubert Humphrey, who were clients of the agency during his tenure.

Charles M. Schulz's Peanuts characters such as Charlie Brown and Snoopy were used by the Dancer Fitzgerald Sample agency for its client Interstate Bakeries's products sold under the Dolly Madison brand name. Luckey was placed in charge as the Senior Art Director/Producer for all advertising containing Schulz characters. As a result, Luckey often visited Schulz to review material as well as famed animator Bill Melendez, whose studio produced the animation containing the Schulz characters. Luckey's relationship with Schulz and Melendez was such that after Luckey left the agency in 1969 to form his own animation company, Dancer Fitzgerald Sample contracted him for several years to continue working on the Dolly Madison campaigns featuring Schulz's characters.

While working at the Guild Bascom & Bonfigli / Dancer Fitzgerald Sample agency, Luckey first collaborated with copywriter Don Hadley. The two became lifelong friends until Hadley's death in 2007. After leaving the agency, Hadley and Luckey co-created numerous short films for Sesame Street.

During the mid-1960s, Jim Henson worked with Luckey on commercials. They remained close friends until Henson's death in 1990. That friendship later resulted in Luckey's work on Sesame Street and his illustration work featuring Henson's Muppet characters in the 1970s and 1980s.

=== Sesame Street ===
During the 1970s, Luckey wrote and animated many short films for Sesame Street and the Children's Television Workshop, often doing the voice work himself as well. Among them are "The Ladybugs' Picnic", which was performed by Jim Kweskin, "That's About the Size of It", the Donnie-Bud Series (with co-writer Don Hadley) featuring numbers 2 to 6, "Penny Candy Man", "Martian Beauty", "#7 The Alligator King", (with Turk Murphy) "Lovely Eleven Morning", "The Old Woman Who Lived in a Nine", and the award-winning "Longie and Shorty the Rattlesnakes" miniseries. He returned to work on one more segment for Sesame Street in 1990 titled "Z – Zebu". Many of Luckey's Sesame Street works were created with his long-time friend and creative collaborator writer / lyricist Don Hadley (1936–2007).

Luckey founded his own animation studio titled the Luckey-Zamora Picture Moving Company in the early 1970s and merged its operation with Colossal Pictures in the late 1980s before joining Pixar in 1992. The company then took studio space in the Produce District of San Francisco. In the 1970s and 1980s, it was the largest animation studio in the San Francisco Bay Area.

His film credits included The Extraordinary Adventures of the Mouse and His Child.

He worked on Betty Boop's Hollywood Mystery and did character design for Back to the Future: The Animated Series from 1991 to 1992.

=== Pixar ===
On the 2005 DVD release of Pixar's The Incredibles, in addition to Bud Luckey's Oscar-nominated short Boundin', the studio included a short biography of Luckey entitled "Who is Bud Luckey?". In that video biography, Pixar (and now Disney's) former Creative Executive Vice President John Lasseter declared: "Bud Luckey is one of the true unsung heroes of animation."

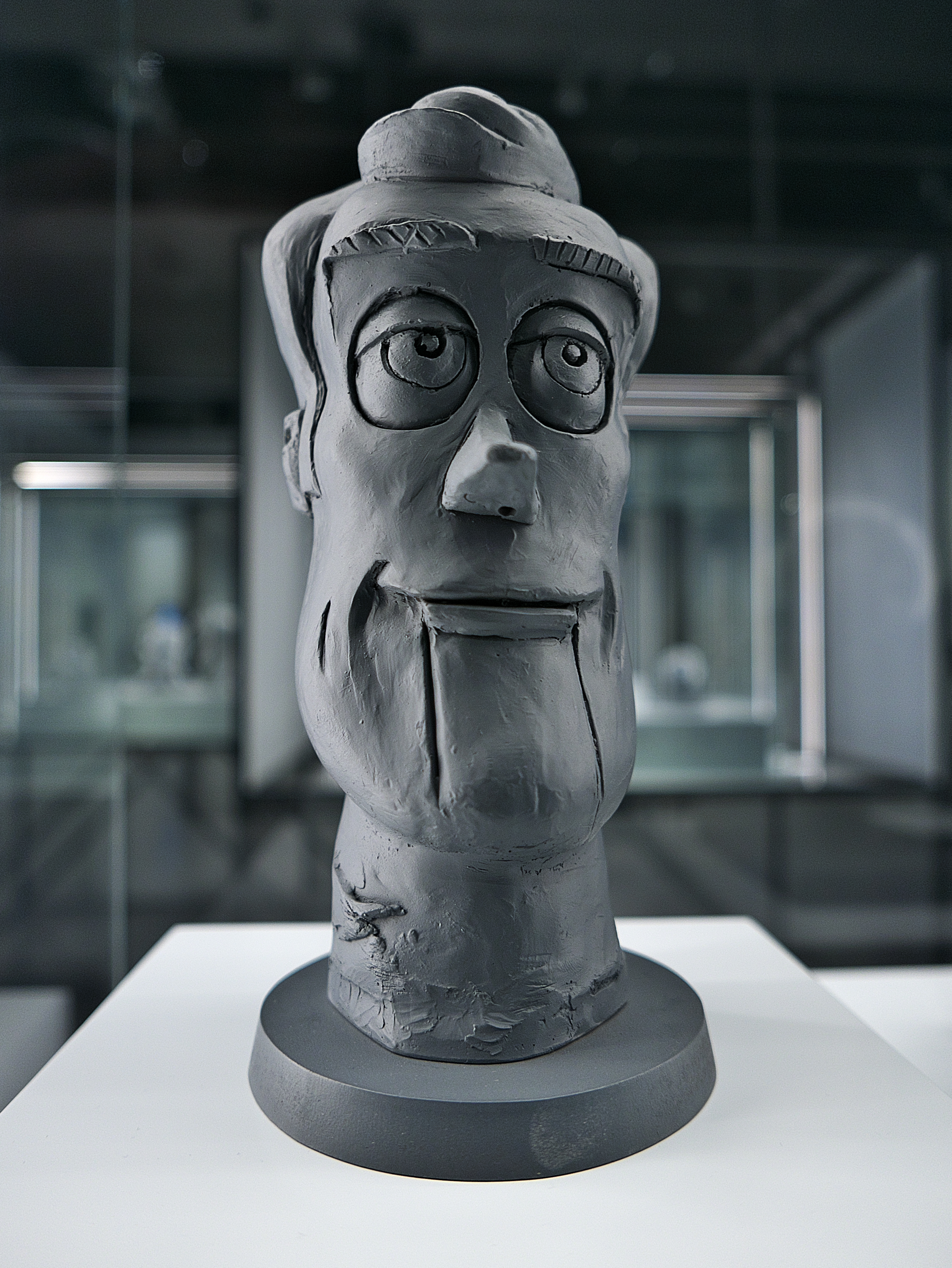
Luckey's original character design for Woody, modeled here as a urethane resin maquette

In 1992, Luckey joined the studio as the oldest employee and their fifth animator, and also worked as a character designer, storyboard artist, and voice performer for Toy Story and other Pixar movies. John Lasseter credits Luckey with the creation and design of the star of Toy Story, Woody, a cowboy. Originally, the character was a ventriloquist's dummy like Edgar Bergen's character Charlie McCarthy. He evolved into a pullstring doll with an empty gun holster.

His character designs can also be seen in Toy Story, A Bug's Life, Toy Story 2, Monsters, Inc., Cars, Ratatouille, and Toy Story 3. In 2003, Luckey gained attention for the short film Boundin', which was released theatrically as the opening cartoon for The Incredibles. It was nominated for an Academy Award for Best Animated Short in 2003. Luckey wrote and designed the short, and also composed the music and lyrics, and sang and performed banjo on the soundtrack for the cartoon. Boundin' won the ASIFA Hollywood Annie Award that same year.

In The Incredibles, Luckey voiced the role of National Supers Agency (NSA) Agent Rick Dicker. In the film's DVD commentary, director Brad Bird jokes that he had an idea to start Boundin' with Rick Dicker coming into his office late at night, pulling out a bottle of "booze" and a banjo to start singing the song about the dancing sheep who is sheared and has his confidence restored by the Jackalope. In the film's sequel, released in June 2018, the role of Agent Dicker was recast with Jonathan Banks as Luckey had retired in 2014. He also lent his voice to Chuckles the Clown in Toy Story 3 and Hawaiian Vacation.

=== Other works ===
Luckey designed and illustrated more than 100 children's books containing his characters, including the Golden Book Mater and the Ghostlight, which featured the Cars character Mater.

He was featured in the 2011 film Winnie the Pooh as the voice of Eeyore.

== Personal life and death ==
Luckey was the father of animator/director/producer Andy Luckey, best known as a producer of the animated Teenage Mutant Ninja Turtles.

On February 24, 2018, Luckey died at his home in Newtown, Connecticut from a stroke at the age of 83. Incredibles 2 was released posthumously and dedicated to his memory with Jonathan Banks taking over his voice role as Rick Dicker.

== Filmography ==
=== Film ===
Year	Title	Voice Role	Notes
1974	The Mad Magazine TV Special		Animator
1995	Toy Story		Character designer, animator, and story artist
1998	A Bug's Life		Additional character designer, sketch artist, and story artist
1999	Toy Story 2		Character designer (new characters) and story artist
2001	Monsters, Inc.		Character designer, story artist, and visual development artist
2003	Boundin'	Narrator, Jackalope, Lamb	Short film, also director, writer, production designer, composer, lyricist, and vocalist
2004	The Incredibles	Rick Dicker	
2005	Jack-Jack Attack	Rick Dicker	Short film
2006	Cars		Additional story artist and visual development artist
2006	Mater and the Ghostlight		Short film; title card designer
2007	Ratatouille		Additional visual development artist
2010	Toy Story 3	Chuckles the Clown	Also story artist
2011	Hawaiian Vacation	Chuckles the Clown	Short film
2011	Winnie the Pooh	Eeyore	Also song performer; final film voice role
2018	Incredibles 2		Posthumous release dedicated to his memory

=== Television ===
Year	Title	Voice Role	Notes
1961	The Alvin Show		Animator
1972–2004	Sesame Street	Donnie Budd, The Alligator King, Alligator King, Bo Peep, Candy Man, Singer 'Martian Beauty', Singer 'That's About the Size of It', Singer 'The Alligator King', Vocalist, Woman	72 episodes; also animator, composer, singer, and independent director of 14 animated shorts (including The Alligator King and The Ladybugs' Picnic)
1991	Back to the Future: The Animated Series		Character designer; 13 episodes
2011–14	The Mini Adventures of Winnie the Pooh	Eeyore	5 episodes; final television voice role

=== Video games ===
Year	Title	Voice Role	Notes
1984	ALF in the Color Caves		Game art and animation
1984	Ducks Ahoy!		Game art and animation
1984	Jukebox		Game art and animation
2013	Disney Infinity	Rick Dicker	
2014	Disney Magical World	Eeyore	English version; final voice role
