= Raya and the Last Dragon =

2021 animated Disney film by Don Hall & Carlos López Estrada

- Theatrical release poster
- Directed by: Don Hall; Carlos López Estrada
- Screenplay by: Qui Nguyen; Adele Lim
- Story by: Paul Briggs; Don Hall; Adele Lim; Carlos López Estrada; Kiel Murray; Qui Nguyen; John Ripa; Dean Wellins
- Based on: Story ideas by Bradley Raymond and Helen Kalafatic
- Produced by: Osnat Shurer; Peter Del Vecho
- Starring: Kelly Marie Tran; Awkwafina; Izaac Wang; Gemma Chan; Daniel Dae Kim; Benedict Wong
- Cinematography: Rob Dressel (layout); Adolph Lusinsky (lighting)
- Edited by: Fabienne Rawley; Shannon Stein
- Music by: James Newton Howard
- Production company: Walt Disney Animation Studios
- Distributed by: Walt Disney Studios Motion Pictures (Note: Distributed under the Walt Disney Pictures banner.)
- Release date: March 5, 2021
- Running time: 107 minutes
- Country: United States
- Language: English
- Budget: $100 million+
- Box office: $130.4 million

Raya and the Last Dragon (/ˈraɪ.ə/ RYE-ə) is a 2021 American animated fantasy action comedy film produced by Walt Disney Animation Studios. It was directed by Don Hall and Carlos López Estrada, and written by Qui Nguyen and Adele Lim, and stars the voices of Kelly Marie Tran, Awkwafina, Izaac Wang, Gemma Chan, Daniel Dae Kim, and Benedict Wong. The film's plot follows the warrior princess Raya (Tran) as she seeks the fabled last dragon, Sisu (Awkwafina), to save her father (Kim) and the land of Kumandra from evil spirits that are known as Druun.

Development of the project began in October 2018, and it was officially announced in August 2019, and the title and voice cast were revealed. During production, Disney replaced several cast and crew members, including the initially announced lead actor Cassie Steele, who was replaced with Tran to conform with changes in character and plot. The film is inspired by traditional Southeast Asian cultures. During design and animation, the filmmakers focused on diverse environments and characters while maintaining authentic cultural representation. James Newton Howard composed the film's score.

Raya and the Last Dragon was released in theaters in the United States on March 5, 2021, and simultaneously on the streaming platform Disney+ for customers with Premier Access. The film was twice delayed from its November 2020 release date due to the COVID-19 pandemic. The film became the third-most-streamed film of 2021 and grossed $130.4 million worldwide. The film received positive reviews from critics and was nominated for several accolades, including an Academy Award nomination for Best Animated Feature.

== Plot ==
Kumandra, a prosperous Southeast Asian land where humans live alongside dragons, is ravaged by the Druun, mindless spirits that petrify every living being in their path. Sisu, the last surviving dragon, concentrates her magic into a gem and vanquishes the Druun, reviving Kumandra's people, but not its dragons. A power struggle for the gem divides Kumandra's people into five chiefdoms called Fang, Heart, Spine, Talon, and Tail, corresponding to their placement along a gigantic dragon-shaped river.

500 years later, Chief Benja of the Heart tribe retains possession of the gem and trains his young daughter Raya, a warrior princess, to protect it. Benja, believing Kumandra can be reunited, holds a feast for all five tribes. During the feast, Raya befriends Namaari, princess of the Fang tribe, who gives Raya a dragon pendant. Raya trusts Namaari and shows her the gem's chamber, but Namaari betrays her as part of a plot to help Fang steal the gem. After being alerted to the attack, Benja and the other tribes arrive and start fighting over the gem, breaking it into five pieces. The gem's destruction creates a fissure that releases the Druun, who quickly overrun the Land of Heart. The tribe leaders each steal a piece of the gem and flee. Benja notices water repels the Druun, and throws Raya into a river to save her before being petrified, resulting in his demise.

Six years later, Raya treks across Kumandra along with her steed and friend Tuk Tuk in order to find Sisu, hoping she will create another gem and vanquish the Druun. In Tail, Raya summons Sisu, who reveals she did not create the gem but wielded it on behalf of her four siblings, all of whom contributed their magic to the gem. Raya and Sisu, who disguises herself as a human, resolve to reclaim the four pieces of the gem, reassemble it, and use it to vanquish the Druun and restore the petrified. Along the way, they meet Boun, a young restaurateur from Tail; Little Noi, an infant con artist from Talon; and Tong, a warrior from Spine; all of whom have lost loved ones to the Druun. Namaari, hoping to gain the gem shards for the Fang tribe, pursues Raya. Since each gem shard they acquire blesses Sisu with one of her siblings' magical powers, Raya, cautious of their new companions, insists Sisu remain disguised. However, when Namaari is about to kill Raya in Spine, Sisu explosively reveals herself to save her.

In Fang, Sisu persuades Raya to propose an alliance with Namaari rather than steal the final shard. As a gesture of trust, Raya returns the pendant Namaari gave her years before. Namaari, torn between her responsibility to Fang and her wish to help defeat the Druun, threatens the party with a crossbow. Sisu tries to calm Namaari down, but Raya attacks with her whip sword after seeing Namaari's finger move on the trigger, causing the crossbow to misfire and kill Sisu. With Sisu gone, all of the water drains away, allowing the Druun to overrun the realm. Enraged, Raya pursues Namaari, and they fight while the others use the gem pieces to help the people of Fang evacuate, even while their power fades. Raya prepares to kill Namaari, but calms down when Namaari reminds her that her inability to trust others led to Sisu's death, and they go to aid the others.

As the gem pieces' power begins to run out and the Druun near her group, Raya remembers how trust allowed Sisu to save the world. She urges the others to unite and reassemble the gem, showing her faith in Namaari by handing over her gem piece and allowing the Druun to petrify her. Boun, Tong, Noi, and her ongis follow suit, and Namaari reassembles the gem before also being petrified. This action unleashes a shockwave that spreads throughout Kumandra, vanquishing the Druun and conjuring up a magical rainstorm that restores the waters and revives everyone, including the dragons, who later revive Sisu. After the group reunites with their loved ones, Sisu follows Raya home to find Chief Benja restored, lauds his daughter's bravery, and the tribes and dragons gather at Heart to unite as Kumandra once again.

== Voice cast ==
- Kelly Marie Tran as Raya, a fierce and virtuous warrior princess of Heart who has been training to become a Guardian of the Dragon Gem. To save her father from petrification and restore peace to Kumandra, Raya embarks on a search for the last dragon. Canadian actress Cassie Steele was originally cast to voice Raya, but was replaced by Tran.
- Awkwafina as Sisu, the last dragon in existence. Sisu has a goofy and somewhat unstable personality but is also brave, kind, wise, and fiercely loyal.
- Gemma Chan as Namaari, a warrior princess of Fang and Raya's rival.
  - Jona Xiao as young Namaari.
- Daniel Dae Kim as Chief Benja, Raya's father and the chief of Heart.
- Benedict Wong as Tong, a formidable, exceptionally large, kind-hearted warrior from Spine who lost his family and fellow villagers to the Druun.
- Izaac Wang as Boun, a charismatic 10-year-old entrepreneur from Tail who lost his family to the Druun. His floating restaurant becomes Raya and Sisu's transport from Tail back to the other lands.
- Sandra Oh as Virana, Namaari's mother and the chieftess of Fang.
- Thalia Tran as Little Noi, a toddler con artist from Talon who lost her mother to the Druun. She was raised by the ongis, creatures that resemble monkeys with catfish whiskers.
- Lucille Soong as Dang Hu, the chieftess of Talon.
- Alan Tudyk as Tuk Tuk, Raya's best friend and trusty steed who is a mix of an armadillo and a pill bug who joins her journey to find Sisu. His name is a reference to a Thai dialect word for auto rickshaws.

The film also features the voices of Dichen Lachman as General Atitaya of Fang and a Spine warrior, Patti Harrison as the chief of Tail, Dumbfoundead as a flower guy called Chai, Sung Kang as former chief of Talon Dang Hai, Sierra Katow as both a Talon merchant and a Fang officer; Ross Butler as the chief of Spine, François Chau as a Fang soldier named Wahn, and Gordon Ip and Paul Yen as Talon merchants.

== Production ==
In October 2018, Deadline Hollywood reported Disney was developing a fantasy animated film that was being produced by Osnat Shurer from a screenplay by Adele Lim, and directed by Paul Briggs and Dean Wellins. Most of the filmmakers had been involved in other Disney films, including Frozen (2013), Zootopia (2016), and Moana (2016). In August 2019, Disney announced the film during its D23 Expo Walt Disney Animation Studios' presentation; Cassie Steele had been cast as Raya and Awkwafina was to play Sisu.

In August 2020, Disney announced the replacement of several cast and crew members. Don Hall and Carlos López Estrada replaced Briggs and Wellins as directors, and the latter two were demoted to co-directors. Story writer John Ripa later also replaced Wellins as a co-director, and Wellins was only credited as a contributing writer in the final film. Kiel Murray, who had co-written the screenplays for Pixar's Cars (2006), Cars 2 (2011) and Cars 3 (2017), also contributed to the story for Raya. Qui Nguyen joined Lim as co-writer and Peter Del Vecho joined Shurer as producer. Kelly Marie Tran replaced Steele to conform to character and plot changes; Shurer said the cast must embody the same spirit as the character and that Tran was better suited to the role.

According to Hall, Disney recast the role because Raya was originally conceived as a "stoic loner" but the team began to infuse her with "levity" and "swagger", characteristics similar to those of Guardians of the Galaxy's (2014) Star-Lord. Tran had unsuccessfully auditioned for the role of Raya but in January 2020, when Tran replaced Steele as Raya, she assumed Disney had already rejected her but was now hiring her to replace the lead actor. Disney separately hired each cast member and individually recorded their lines, keeping the actors' identities secret from each other until they accidentally discovered the others' involvement in the film before Disney revealed them to the cast. Despite the effects of the COVID-19 pandemic on the film industry, the cast worked and successfully completed the project from their homes. The film's budget was at least $100 million.

=== Development and design ===
Raya and the Last Dragon is inspired by traditional Southeast Asian cultures. The production team consulted experts from Southeast Asia Story Trust to ensure an accurate cultural representation in the film, and they emphasized the importance of avoiding stereotypical portrayals of Asian characters. To conduct background research, the production team traveled to Laos, Vietnam, Cambodia, Thailand, Singapore, Malaysia, Indonesia, and the Philippines; they were inspired by the local sense of acceptance, unity, and trust, which they adopted as themes for the film. The production team explored ways to express Kumandra's characteristics; they designed its five fractured lands with unique climates and characteristics to reflect the diverse beliefs and culture of their people, and each land and its people represent a mandala icon revolving around Kumandra. This is inspired by the local religious teaching that everything is centered around a common belief system or cosmology. They used unconventional shapes, experimented with scale and color, and placed objects in unexpected locations to convey Kumandra's expression of fantasy. Kumandra's Dragon River is inspired by the Mekong. Dynamic colors in each land indicate Raya's location in the film.

Raya and Sisu concept art

According to character art director Shiyoon Kim:

At the core of our film are two characters, their arc, and their relationship, so I tried to imagine the two of them at different moments in their journey. [I] sketched the two as pals who hang out and share secrets, growing closer and opening up over time.

— The Art of Raya and the Last Dragon (2021)

The production team focused the film on Raya and Sisu, and their conflicting characteristics of trust issues and over-trusting are the basis for the film's humor and emotion. The team initially separately designed the characters, drawing several designs of Raya and Sisu but they felt that something was lacking and their designs were incomplete, prompting them to design the characters together, which helped them better understand how they visually and thematically complemented each other.

Raya was conceived as a serious swordswoman who focuses on finding Sisu, and Sisu was conceived as a dragon trapped in her human form who refused to help Raya. As writing progressed, Raya softened and Sisu became more helpful; the writers approached Raya as a character who acts flawlessly and Sisu as one who does everything sideways. The production team ensured throughout the film, Raya's observed quality would be culturally authentic, functional for her role as a swordswoman, and reflective of her emotional journey. Her costume is based on a traditional sabai top and dhoti pants with cultural dragon references, and her high-collar cape and large hat act as protective layers the team intended to remove as she emotionally evolves in the film. The team designed Raya with a feminine nose and strong, prominent cheekbones; they aimed to make her exceptionally expressive and emotionally diverse but mainly focused on her playful, comedic aspects.

Sisu and the other dragons are inspired by the naga, mythical beings who can manifest as serpents or humans and are associated with water. The team explored many silhouettes and attitudes of Sisu that ranged from ethereal and magical to ferocious and skeptical. Specific design elements in Sisu's dragon form were retained in her human attire to create a cohesive, recognizable character design.

The poses of the dragon statues represent the production team's efforts to convey the same sense of grandeur dragons have in Southeast Asian culture. The production team drew inspiration from the naga's cultural influence and powerful presence in Southeast Asia, seeking to evoke the feeling of them existing in an invisible world beyond their own. As a result, all of the dragons except Sisu were revered and similarly reflect this effect. The designers gave the dragons' footsteps colorful, refracted ripples of light to emphasize their cultural association with water, among other design elements, including glowing characteristics, fluid grooms and textures, scales, and translucent fins.

Water is a central element in the story; it is used to illustrate Raya's emotional growth. Colored bodies of water represent moments in which Raya feels close to those around her while high-contrast, dark-colored ones represent her distrust and insecurity. The Druun were approached as embodiments of hopelessness and dread, and were given a dynamic, cloudy form that is difficult to perceive as a continuous form; their concepts include aquatic life, water boiling in reverse, dough folding in on itself, black holes, and parasitic behaviors.

Dragons also influenced the design of Heart; dragons appear in sacred fortresses and palaces, and serve as cultural symbols. The production team aimed to make Heart's Pond a magical, sacred place because it represents an important character moment between Raya and her father, incorporating elements of flowers that only bloom at night. While researching these flowers, they came across an art installation involving lamps that would brighten and dim. This inspired them to create Kumandra flowers, which light up when the Dragon Gem is near.

Tail was intended as the wild west of Kumandra, drawing elements from fantasy plateaus and sand waterfalls. Talon is inspired by Southeast-Asian floating markets and night markets. The designers approached Talon as a five-level pier, which they envisioned starting at the top level; as the waterline dropped due to drought, new platforms would be constructed underneath. Spine's design was influenced by bamboo, and focused on natural forms and textures. Its design includes a black, bamboo frame and a colossal, woolly-mammoth-like tusked roofline with large, stone foundations from the surrounding mountain. The production team experimented with shadows and lighting to create a sense of mystery and drama for Spine's design.

Fang's design reflects its commitment to strict principles; design elements include brutalism and strong, monolithic, rigid geometric shapes. The production team explored stretching Fang buildings and using repeated rooflines to evoke the ominous sensation of a large creature peering down. In the Fang Palace, tall, vertical banners and giant, gold, fang-like sculptures hang ominously from high ceilings. Their rectangular, sharp edges and cold, sterile designs were meant to contrast the floral motifs and round, organic shapes of Heart.

To express Namaari's strength and power, the designers experimented with facial expressions and physicality, including her aggressive nature and fierce stare. They provided Namaari with a hard-edged outfit and a predominantly off-white color palette to express her tough personality. Young Namaari's costume is also designed to contrast her with young Raya; Namaari's stark, white and gold elements represent Fang's harsh lifestyle, contrasting with Raya's draped, soft, blue designs.

=== Animation and cinematography ===
Approximately 800 artists worked on the film; they used software applications such as Autodesk Maya, Houdini, and Nuke. The animation team mixed traditional and 3D animation to create a unique style of warmth, imperfection, and distinctiveness that resembles shadow puppets used in Chinese storytelling. The characters' costumes were constructed by folding long pieces of fabric, and the structure of the clothing did not heavily rely on seams; this departs from the traditional method of tailoring, which uses patterns as a guide.

The animation team used intricate lighting techniques to create Kumandra's diverse, atmospheric environments, which range from deserts to tropical forests. They used new techniques to depict the diversity of the crowd within each tribe, including reusing and remixing interchangeable parts to efficiently create diverse characters. They also used a system to manage the assets they were designing, which helped them confirm these elements looked correct and consistent throughout the film. It also ensured the data could be effectively used in the later stages of production. Talon and Tail were particularly complex to animate; Talon's complexities stem from its intricate, diverse elements and assets that needed to be moved around water. Despite Tail's minimalist landscape, the perspective needed to be very close to capture the desert floor; the manual modeling of cracks and the scattering of rocks and vegetation elements were added complexities.

The animators significantly expanded their crowd system, which was used to generate groups of characters and objects, to suit the film's diverse, complex scenes. They modified their existing workflows, tools and software. The animators also experimented with creatively controlled, computer-generated simulations and procedural algorithmic approaches. The in-house Skeleton Library that was based on Houdini software also helped to manage the complexity of the diverse elements.

Anisotropic distances—unequal distances in different directions—in Position-based Dynamics (PBD) and Boids simulation techniques were used to create intricate scenes, including beetles crawling on top of one another, massive schools of fish, and the movements of dragons. PBD is used to simulate the behavior of objects whereas Boid simulations involve modeling the flocking or herding behavior of creatures. Procedural animation layers were applied to simulate the movements of fish and dragons, which were automatically generated using algorithms. A technique called "distance integral invariant" was used to detect contacts between the dragons' feet and the ground, ensuring realistic interaction with the environment.

The film's cinematography focuses on emphasizing Raya's character and her distrust of the world. The animators created contrasting camera-and-lighting styles to illustrate trust and distrust, applying them sequence-to-sequence and shot-to-shot based on her story arc. For example, the distrustful Raya was captured with a wide-angle lens, deep focus, and a narrow color palette while the trusting Sisu was captured with a telephoto lens, shallow focus, and a broad color palette. To highlight the abrupt transition between Raya being thrown into the blue waters of the Dragon River in Heart to the scene six years later in Tail's desert, the cinematographers used light-distortion techniques to create a mirage illusion, accentuating the dramatic shift in lighting, color, climate, and water in the film.

=== Music ===
James Newton Howard composed the score for Raya and the Last Dragon, and Jhené Aiko wrote and performed a song entitled "Lead the Way", which is heard during the end credits. The score was released on February 26, 2021. The following month, Filipino singer KZ Tandingan was hired to perform "Gabay" (Guide), Disney's first-ever Filipino-language song, which is a Filipino version of "Lead the Way". "Gabay" was released as part of the soundtrack of the film's Filipino dub; Allie Benedicto, studio marketing head of Disney Philippines, said the song "demonstrates [Disney's] commitment to work with local creative talents".

== Marketing and release ==
Disney released trailers for Raya and the Last Dragon from October 21, 2020 to January 26, 2021. Viewers expressed concerns about the limited Southeast Asian representation in the film's primarily East-Asian cast, and advocated for a more culturally accurate and diverse representation. To promote the film, Disney collaborated with brands such as McDonald's, LG, and Procter & Gamble on toys and merchandise. They also partnered with Southeast Asian brands like Omsum and Sanzo to acknowledge the Southeast Asia cultures that inspired the film, and they supported and promoted local, emerging advertisers there. When choosing promotional partners, they accounted for the film's target audience and the increasing audiences in theaters despite the COVID-19 pandemic.

Raya and the Last Dragon was initially scheduled for release on November 25, 2020, but its release was postponed to March 12, 2021 to avoid competition with DreamWorks Animation's The Croods: A New Age, before moving up a week, in response to the COVID-19 pandemic. The film was simultaneously released in theaters and on the streaming platform Disney+ Premier Access, where it was available for purchase until June 4, 2021, and then became free for all subscribers from that date. In theaters, Raya and the Last Dragon was accompanied by the short film Us Again (2021).

Walt Disney Studios Home Entertainment released Raya and the Last Dragon for digital download on April 2, 2021, and on Ultra HD Blu-ray, Blu-ray, and DVD on May 18. The digital release also included Us Again. Bonus features bundled with the Blu-ray release include "An Introduction to Us Again", a behind-the-scenes dicumentary about Us Again; "Taste of Raya", a virtual Southeast Asian dining experience; "Raya: Bringing It Home", a documentary about the film's animators working at their homes; "Martial Artists", a film the martial-art forms and weapons used in the film; "We are Kumandra", the cultural influences of the film from the Southeast Asia Story Trust; outtakes from the film; facts and Easter eggs; Ripa's experience of working on the storyboard; and deleted scenes.

== Thematic analysis ==
Scholars mainly analyzed themes related to trust and feminism. Raya's inability to trust stems from her childhood, when her friend Namaari deceived Raya to obtain the Dragon Gem, leading her to distrust and distance herself from others. Benja's unwavering trust in others despite betrayal leads to a traumatic incident that intensifies Raya's distrust. During her journey, Raya encounters repeated betrayals that reinforce her vigilance and trust problems, although she learns to overcome her past and bravely forgives with much assistance from Sisu. Sri Wulan compared Raya's childhood experiences to those of children who learn to distrust their perceptions when they are confronted by double messages from their families. He noted Raya's over-protective, vigilant, isolating behavior, and her tendency to assume and anticipate recurring betrayals. Tawakkal et al. said Raya's childhood experience symbolizes social problems, including division and conflict arising from prejudice, hatred, greed, and thirst for power, and advocated for the importance of introspection and mutual understanding.

Wardah and Kusuma said Raya and the Last Dragon reflects the evolving themes feminism, gender equality, and diverse female empowerment that are prevalent in earlier Disney princess films. Unlike those films, which romanticize love and emphasize physical beauty, Raya and the Last Dragon portrays a strong, female, warrior protagonist who struggles to reunite her country. Raya and the other female characters are depicted as rational, courageous, and independent of patriarchal dominance, and they emphasize the importance of leadership and friendship over romance.

Others critiqued the film's Southeast Asian inspiration elements. Sutantos said the film's mix of cultural elements from various Southeast Asian countries misrepresents the philosophical meaning behind each element. According to Nirwana, Raya's qualities, including bravery, honesty, loyalty, and an appreciation of cultural diversity, are highly valued in Indonesian culture. These also include the ability to collaborate to reach a common goal and the portrayal of spiritual activities that align with the values commonly practiced throughout Southeast Asia. Rosella et al. said the film's portrayal of multiculturalism is conveyed through the depiction of Southeast Asian cuisines and practices. This unity and togetherness between tribes shows the diversity of Southeast Asia cultures. As is customary in these cultures, Raya and the Last Dragon also emphasizes the importance of maintaining a harmonious relationship with nature. Kumandra is a metaphor for environmental harmony and is portrayed as an ideal and heavenly place where everything coexists in harmony. Benja strives to restore this environmental harmony after the tribes are divided by greed, hatred, and the Dragon Gems. As such, Wulan et al. said the film advocates for environmental unity and sustainability.

== Reception ==
=== Box office ===
Raya and the Last Dragon grossed $54.7 million in the United States and Canada, and $75.7 million in other territories for a worldwide take of $130.4 million.

During its opening weekend in the US and Canada, Raya and the Last Dragon grossed $2.5 million on its first day and debuted at $8.5 million across 2,045 theaters, topping the box office. Theater chains Cinemark and Harkins in the US, and Cineplex in Canada, did not initially run the film after declining Disney's rental terms, (Note: Cinemark would later reach a deal with Disney and start running the film in its tenth week of release.) which meant Raya and the Last Dragon failed to match the opening-weekend grosses of family-centered films The Croods: A New Age (2020) and Tom & Jerry (2021). Raya and the Last Dragon's performance improved in the following weeks, matching and eventually exceeding Tom & Jerry's domestic box-office revenue. Raya and the Last Dragon grossed $5.5 million in its second weekend and $5.2 million in its third, remaining the most-popular film at the box office. Outside North America, Raya and the Last Dragon debuted in 32 markets, grossing $26.2 million in its opening weekend; the top countries were China ($8.6 million) and Russia ($2.8 million). The film earned $11.5 million in its second weekend and $8 million in its third in 29 markets.

=== Audience viewership ===
In its first three days in the week of March 1, Raya and the Last Dragon was watched for 355 million minutes and was the fourth-most-watched film of the week. The film was released worldwide on Disney+ with no additional cost on June 4, 2021; it was the second-most-viewed streaming title after Netflix's Lucifer. It was viewed for approximately 1.1 billion minutes from May 31 to June 6, a significant increase for the film and any streaming title, which previously had 115 million viewing minutes a week when it was only available as a premium title for $30.

According to the official list of the most-watched streaming titles of 2021, which was released on January 21, 2022, by Deadline Hollywood and Nielsen Holdings, Raya and the Last Dragon was the third-most-streamed film of 2021 with 8.34 billion minutes watched, behind Luca (2021) and Moana with 10.5 billion and 8.9 billion minutes watched, respectively. In January 2022, technology firm Akamai reported Raya and the Last Dragon was the ninth-most-pirated film of 2021.

=== Critical response ===
Raya and the Last Dragon has an approval rating of 93% based on 303 professional reviews on the review aggregator website Rotten Tomatoes. The consensus reads: "Another gorgeously animated, skillfully voiced entry in the Disney canon, Raya and the Last Dragon continues the studio's increased representation while reaffirming that its classic formula is just as reliable as ever". Metacritic, which uses a weighted average, assigned Raya and the Last Dragon a score of 74 out of 100 based on 48 critics, indicating "generally favorable reviews". Audiences polled by CinemaScore gave the film an average grade of "A" on a scale of A+ to F, while PostTrak reported 92% of those gave it a positive score and 78% said they would recommend it.

The Atlantic and The New York Observer praised the film's imagery and themes. San Francisco Chronicle, among others, said the film expertly balances emotion, humor, and social politics against a backdrop of beautiful animation and engaging storylines. (Note: Attributed to multiple references:) Rolling Stone and RogerEbert.com praised its blend of imagery and cultural mythologies, finding it beautiful and an emotionally engaging narrative that is reminiscent of classic Disney animated productions. Similarly, Vanity Fair and Vulture said the film expertly conveys the emotional depth and themes of the story through beautiful animation and compelling characters. Praise was also directed at the strong cast choice and diverse characters. (Note: Attributed to multiple references:)

The story and limited Southeast Asian representation were criticized. (Note: Attributed to multiple references:) The Atlantic criticized Raya's lack of depth, describing her as lacking cultural specificity and behaving more like a tourist than a genuine representation of Southeast Asia cultures. The New York Times said the film falls short of the conventional Disney princess narratives in delivering a correct cultural representation and corporate strategy. Variety criticized the execution of the story and worldbuilding, which they found lack an elegant, smooth narrative flow. Reviewers for The Irish Times and Vox cited the perceived unwieldy central conceit, and indistinct and insensitive cultural representation, respectively.

== Accolades ==
Accolades received by Raya and the Last Dragon
| Award | Date of ceremony | Category | Recipient(s) | Result | Ref. |
|---|---|---|---|---|---|
| Academy Awards | March 27, 2022 | Best Animated Feature | Don Hall, Carlos López Estrada, Osnat Shurer, and Peter Del Vecho | Nominated | |
| Alliance of Women Film Journalists Awards | January 25, 2022 | Best Animated Film | Raya and the Last Dragon | Nominated | |
| Alliance of Women Film Journalists Awards | January 25, 2022 | Best Animated Female | Kelly Marie Tran | Nominated | |
| Alliance of Women Film Journalists Awards | January 25, 2022 | Best Animated Female | Awkwafina | Nominated | |
| American Cinema Editors Awards | March 5, 2022 | Best Edited Animated Feature Film | Fabienne Rawley and Shannon Stein | Nominated | |
| Annie Awards | March 12, 2022 | Best Animated Feature | Raya and the Last Dragon | Nominated | |
| Annie Awards | March 12, 2022 | Best FX – Feature | Alex Moaveni, Dimitri Berberov, Bruce Wright, Scott Townsend, and Dale Mayeda | Nominated | |
| Annie Awards | March 12, 2022 | Best Character Animation – Feature | Jennifer Hager | Nominated | |
| Annie Awards | March 12, 2022 | Best Character Design – Feature | Ami Thompson | Nominated | |
| Annie Awards | March 12, 2022 | Best Music – Feature | James Newton Howard and Jhené Aiko | Nominated | |
| Annie Awards | March 12, 2022 | Best Production Design – Feature | Paul Felix, Mingjue Helen Chen, and Cory Loftis | Nominated | |
| Annie Awards | March 12, 2022 | Best Storyboarding – Feature | Luis Logam | Nominated | |
| Annie Awards | March 12, 2022 | Best Voice Acting – Feature | Kelly Marie Tran | Nominated | |
| Annie Awards | March 12, 2022 | Best Writing – Feature | Qui Nguyen and Adele Lim | Nominated | |
| Annie Awards | March 12, 2022 | Best Editorial – Feature | Fabienne Rawley, Shannon Stein, Todd Fulkerson, Rick Hammel, and Brian Millman | Nominated | |
| Art Directors Guild Awards | March 5, 2022 | Art Directors Guild Award for Excellence in Production Design for an Animated Film | Paul Felix, Mingjue Helen Chen, and Cory Loftis | Nominated | |
| Artios Awards | March 23, 2022 | Outstanding Achievement in Casting – Animation | Jamie Sparer Roberts and Grace C. Kim | Nominated | |
| BMI Film & TV Awards | July 12, 2021 | Theatrical Film | James Newton Howard | Won | |
| Cinema Audio Society Awards | March 19, 2022 | Cinema Audio Society Award for Outstanding Achievement in Sound Mixing for a Motion Picture – Animated | Paul McGrath, David E. Fluhr, Gabriel Guy, Alan Meyerson, Doc Kane, and Scott Curtis | Nominated | |
| Critics' Choice Movie Awards | March 13, 2022 | Best Animated Feature | Raya and the Last Dragon | Nominated | |
| Dallas–Fort Worth Film Critics Association Awards | December 20, 2021 | Best Animated Film | Raya and the Last Dragon | Nominated | |
| Georgia Film Critics Association Awards | January 14, 2022 | Best Animated Film | Raya and the Last Dragon | Nominated | |
| Golden Globe Awards | January 9, 2022 | Best Animated Feature Film | Raya and the Last Dragon | Nominated | |
| Golden Reel Awards | March 13, 2022 | Outstanding Achievement in Sound Editing – Sound Effects, Foley, Dialogue and ADR for Animated Feature Film | Shannon Mills, Brad Semenoff, Nia Hansen, Samson Neslund, David C. Hughes, Cameron Barker, Chris Frazier, Steve Orlando, John Roesch, Shelley Roden, Jim Weidman, and David Olson | Won | |
| Golden Trailer Awards | July 22, 2021 | Best Animation TrailerByte for a Feature Film | "Dragon Magic Social" (Create Advertising London) | Nominated | |
| Golden Trailer Awards | July 22, 2021 | Best Animation TrailerByte for a Feature Film | "TrailerBytes" (Outpost Media) | Nominated | |
| Hollywood Critics Association Awards | July 1, 2021 | Midseason Award – Best Picture | Raya and the Last Dragon | Nominated | |
| Hollywood Critics Association Awards | February 28, 2022 | Best Animated Film | Raya and the Last Dragon | Nominated | |
| Houston Film Critics Society Awards | January 19, 2022 | Best Animated Feature | Raya and the Last Dragon | Nominated | |
| International Film Music Critics Association Awards | February 17, 2022 | Film Composer of the Year | James Newton Howard | Won | |
| International Film Music Critics Association Awards | February 17, 2022 | Best Original Score for an Animated Film | James Newton Howard | Won | |
| NAACP Image Awards | February 26, 2022 | Outstanding Animated Motion Picture | Raya and the Last Dragon | Nominated | |
| NAACP Image Awards | February 26, 2022 | Outstanding Character Voice-Over Performance – Motion Picture | Awkwafina | Nominated | |
| Nickelodeon Kids' Choice Awards | April 9, 2022 | Favorite Voice from an Animated Movie | Awkwafina (Note: Also for The SpongeBob Movie: Sponge on the Run (2020)) | Nominated | |
| Online Film Critics Society Awards | January 24, 2022 | Best Animated Feature | Raya and the Last Dragon | Nominated | |
| People's Choice Awards | December 7, 2021 | Family Movie of 2021 | Raya and the Last Dragon | Nominated | |
| Producers Guild of America Awards | March 19, 2022 | Outstanding Producer of Animated Theatrical Motion Pictures | Osnat Shurer and Peter Del Vecho | Nominated | |
| The ReFrame Stamp | March 1, 2022 | 2021 Top 28-Grossing Narrative Feature Recipients | Raya and the Last Dragon | Won (Note: This award does not have a single winner, but recognizes multiple films.) | |
| San Diego Film Critics Society Awards | January 10, 2022 | Best Animated Film | Raya and the Last Dragon | Nominated | |
| Seattle Film Critics Society Awards | January 17, 2022 | Best Animated Feature | Raya and the Last Dragon | Nominated | |
| Visual Effects Society Awards | March 8, 2022 | Outstanding Visual Effects in an Animated Feature | Kyle Odermatt, Osnat Shurer, Kelsey Hurley, and Paul Felix | Nominated | |
| Visual Effects Society Awards | March 8, 2022 | Outstanding Animated Character in an Animated Feature | Brian Menz, Punn Wiantrakoon, Erik Hansen, and Vicky YuTzu Lin for Tuk Tuk | Nominated | |
| Visual Effects Society Awards | March 8, 2022 | Outstanding Created Environment in an Animated Feature | Mingjue Helen Chen, Chaiwon Kim, Virgilio John Aquino, and Diana Jiang LeVangie for Talon | Nominated | |
| Visual Effects Society Awards | March 8, 2022 | Outstanding Virtual Cinematography in a CG Project | Rob Dressel, Adolph Lusinsky, and Paul Felix | Nominated | |
| Visual Effects Society Awards | March 8, 2022 | Outstanding Effects Simulations in an Animated Feature | Le Joyce Tong, Henrik Fält, Rattanin Sirinaruemarn, and Jacob Rice | Won | |
| Washington D.C. Area Film Critics Association Awards | December 6, 2021 | Best Animated Feature | Raya and the Last Dragon | Nominated | |
| Washington D.C. Area Film Critics Association Awards | December 6, 2021 | Best Voice Performance | Awkwafina | Won | |
| Washington D.C. Area Film Critics Association Awards | December 6, 2021 | Best Voice Performance | Kelly Marie Tran | Nominated | |

== Works cited ==
- Hurley, Kalikolehua; Shurer, Osnat (2021). The Art of Raya and the Last Dragon. Chronicle Books. ISBN 978-1-7972-0297-6.
