= Raya (Disney character) =

Character from film Raya and the Last Dragon

- Raya and the Last Dragon character
- First appearance: Raya and the Last Dragon (2021)
- Created by: Adele Lim; Qui Nguyen
- Voiced by: Kelly Marie Tran

In-universe information
- Title: Princess of Heart
- Occupation: Guardian of the Dragon Gem
- Affiliation: Disney Princesses
- Weapon: Fantasy whip sword
- Family: Chief Benja (father)
- Origin: Kumandra
- Pet: Tuk Tuk (pill bug, armadillo and pug hybrid)

Raya is a character in Walt Disney Animation Studios' animated film Raya and the Last Dragon (2021). Created by screenwriters Adele Lim and Qui Nguyen, Raya is the thirteenth official member of the Disney Princess line-up and Disney's first Southeast Asian princess. She is voiced by American actress Kelly Marie Tran. Cassie Steele was initially cast in the role until the character underwent changes and the filmmakers decided to find a different type of performer for Raya and replaced her with Tran.

The daughter of the chief of the Heart tribe, one of five warring tribes of the fictional land of Kumandra, Raya is a warrior princess who is appointed the guardian of the Dragon Gem. When the gem is shattered, plague monsters known as the Druun are released and turn the people of Kumandra, including Raya's father, to stone. With only her pet Tuk Tuk, a pill bug, armadillo and pug hybrid as a companion, she travels across Kumandra to find the last remaining dragon, Sisu, and retrieve the gem pieces to vanquish the Druun. Her rivalry with Namaari, the princess of the Fang tribe, is central to the film's themes of trust and unity.

Raya has received a positive critical response for her characterisation as a strong, independent female protagonist and an unconventional Disney Princess. Tran also received praise for voicing the character and was nominated for several film awards.

== Development ==
=== Concept and creation ===
For the setting of Raya and the Last Dragon, Disney took inspiration from the countries of Southeast Asia. Producer Osnat Shurer said that this arose organically by sitting together and discussing the story. Initially the film was conceived as a story about a dragon, which was combined with an idea about a fantasy region composed of five kingdoms that form the shape of a dragon and a collective desire to present a strong female warrior as the film's protagonist. The decision to focus on an Asian dragon resulted in Shurer arranging a trip for the creative team to visit Laos, Indonesia, Thailand and Malaysia for the purpose of conducting cultural research. Shurer noted that Southeast Asia covers a vast area but that the people shared the same principles, including "a history of powerful women" which helped to shape the fantasy world they were creating.

Following the research trip, Osnan brought onboard screenwriter Adele Lim, who was born in Malaysia and expressed delight that the film took inspiration from her culture. She wanted Raya to embody the tradition of female warriors in Southeast Asia. Alongside Lim, her co-writer Qui Nguyen and directors Don Hall and Carlos López-Estrada were also brought in to join the production team. The filmmakers' aim was to celebrate the culture and diversity of Southeast Asia through the five kingdoms of Kumandra. López Estrada described this as "very different traditions, very different cultures, very different identities" that come together and develop into a harmonious people after learning to trust each other. Rather than drawing ideas from one specific place for creating the fictional land of Kumandra, the team took inspiration from many cultural influences across the countries of Southeast Asia. Lim opined that although there are many different people within the region, "it's wonderful because of all these different elements".

In addition to making several research trips to various Southeast Asian countries, the production team collaborated with the Southeast Asian Story Trust, a group of cultural experts from different backgrounds who advised on various cultural aspects of the film. The production team also felt that it was important to cast Asian and Asian American actors in the film, including Awkwafina, who voices Sisu the dragon.

=== Voice ===
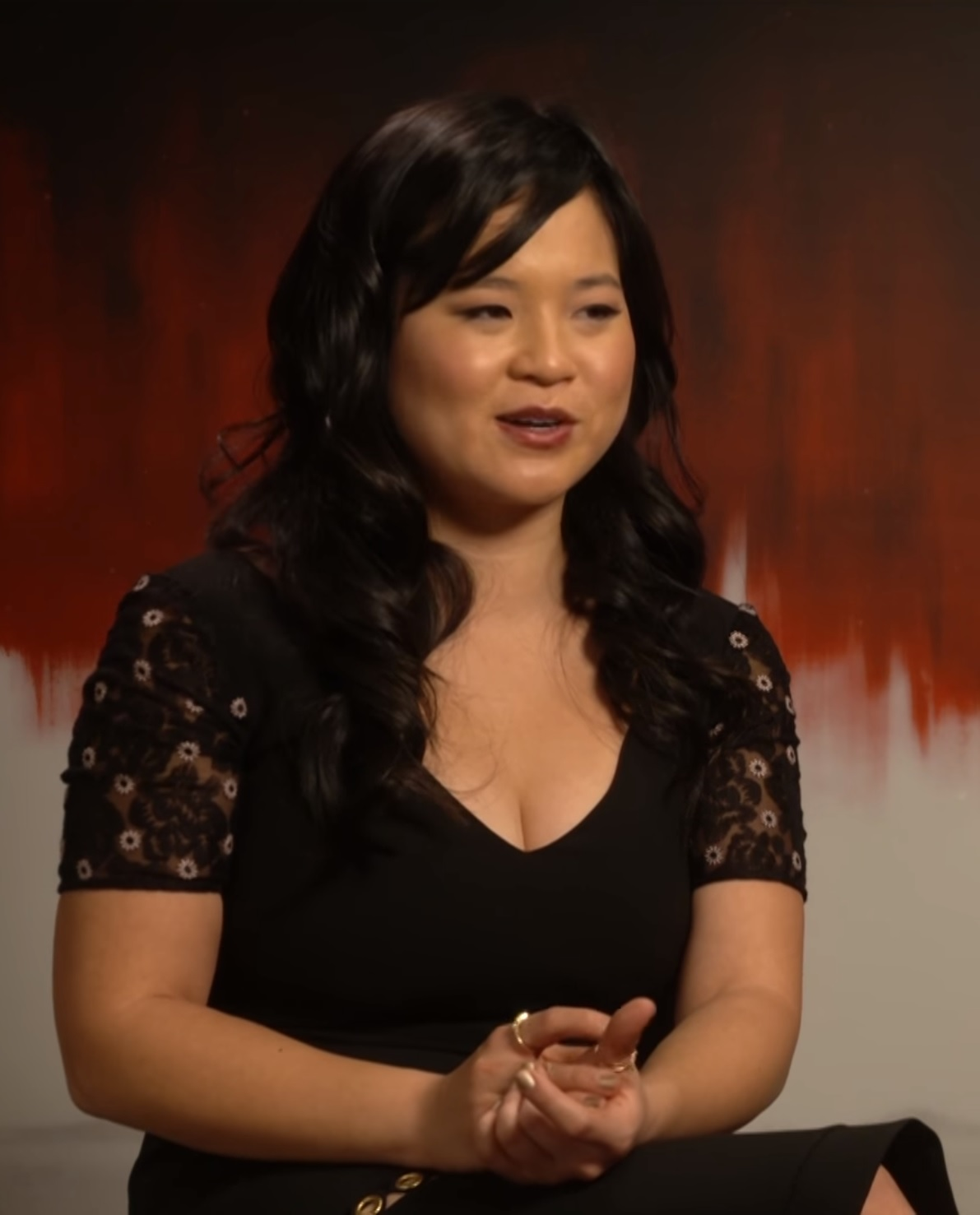
Kelly Marie Tran is the voice of Raya in Raya and the Last Dragon.

Raya is voiced by American actress Kelly Marie Tran. Canadian actress Cassie Steele was originally cast in the role, which was officially announced when the project was unveiled D23 Expo in August 2019. By August 2020, she had been replaced by Tran, who had previously auditioned for the role. Having initially lost out, Tran was surprised to get a call to say she had got the part, describing it as "horrifying". According to Walt Disney Animation Studios, the replacement was made out of needing a different type of performer. Shurer explained that the casting change was necessary due to changes made to Raya, which meant that Steele's voice was no longer right for the character.

Tran is the first Southeast Asian actress to take the lead role in a Disney film. López Estrada and Hall were stunned by her audition and knew she was perfect for the role. Hall said, "She is Raya — just her buoyancy and her positivity, but yet there's a strength as well to Kelly and the character". They were particularly impressed by her comedy and ad-lib skills, as well as the depth of emotion that she brought to the character. After improvising one of the scenes, the filmmakers decided to change it to match her performance due to being so impressed by her interpretation, which López Estrada said "had us all in tears". In the scene, Raya builds an altar and sheds tears after reciting a prayer to the dragon Sisu, overwhelmed with emotion. Tran was encouraged to give her own interpretation of the scene, which ultimately diverged from the script. Tran thought it important to express her desperation and said that, while other strong female characters tend to be portrayed "almost masculine to the point of erasing femininity", she wanted Raya to show various sides of her character. For Tran, who had previously been cast in Star Wars: The Last Jedi and was subjected to racist and sexist harassment on social media by fans, the scene was her way into Raya's character. She felt that she had previously viewed the world through rose-coloured glasses and, like Raya, had returned with more experience. Having been a Disney fan at school, she felt that the role provided an ideal opportunity to express her heritage. She said she had never voiced words in Vietnamese before and was able to work with Nguyen on the pronunciation of words in Kumandra.

The film was the first by Walt Disney Animation Studios to be mostly produced from home due to the impact of the COVID-19 pandemic. This meant that Tran, along with the other actors, voiced the character remotely using recording equipment sent to her home by Disney Animation's technology department. The problem of creating proper acoustics was solved by building a tent out of sound blankets in her living room. Joking that it was not a glamorous experience, Tran said that her boyfriend was able to construct the tent for her by taping the blankets to the walls with duct tape and pushing furniture together. Creating Raya was a collaborative process involving many discussions. Tran said that she used her own experiences as inspiration for the character: "I won't be able to see where I end and where Raya begins, and vice versa." As a Vietnamese American, Tran commented that in her youth she never saw her culture represented anywhere and thus felt that the film presents the idea that anyone can be a princess or warrior regardless of their background or appearance. She described Raya as a "really badass, gritty warrior" and was pleased to work on a film that attempts to "flip the narrative on what it means to be a princess".

=== Characterisation ===
According to Tran, many initial conversations about Raya centred around establishing a character that had not been seen before and challenging the concept of what constitutes a "princess" and a "hero". In the early stages of production there was a disagreement at Walt Disney Animation Studios over whether Raya could be given the title of Disney Princess. It was Lim who insisted that she should, being of the opinion that a princess should be capable of leading a kingdom. She said that having grown up with Disney Princesses such as Snow White, it was meaningful to see Disney draw characters from diverse cultures and she wanted girls to see themselves in Raya. Shurer said that the contemporary Disney Princess is an "aspirational character", explaining that the studio aimed to depict characters like Raya and Moana in a very different way to earlier princesses in order to reflect the values of the production team. Lim felt that Raya's struggle to restore the broken kingdom is relevant to children in the real world, despite being set in a fantasy land. She commented that solving the problems of the broken land is a difficult task and that, even though Raya is betrayed and loses everything, she "has to keep reaching out" to succeed. Shurer commented that being a female hero in a Disney film does not automatically define the character as a princess, but she considered the responsibility of being a leader in a divided world as important to Raya's success as being a warrior.

The production team decided to make Raya an action-adventure fantasy rather than a musical or a Disney Princess film. Hall said that despite technically being a princess due to being the daughter of the Chief of Heart, Raya is focused on being the Guardian of the Dragon Gem, thereby serving as an "aspirational kind of warrior character." Nguyen, who is Vietnamese American, noted that Raya is Disney's first Southeast Asian princess and said that it was personally significant to see a character that "really represented me, our voice, our culture". For Lim, Raya represents the culture of her youth. Having grown up with Hong Kong action films, she enjoyed watching "the hot girl, the mean girl, the villain", but after immigrating to the United States she came to realise that strong female characters in Hollywood films hardly had a story arc because they were already depicted as physically perfect. Lim also commented that Raya's relationship with her father Benja is representative of the culture of close relationships in a Southeast Asian family and her father's enormous influence on her own life. Nguyen said that Raya's characterisation needed to be realistic and reflect the spirit of the women that he grew up with. Noting that Asian American characters in film were often stereotyped as "stoic, serious, oddly obsessed with bringing honor to our family", he said that Raya was written to be "fun", "quippy" and "clever". In consultation with the Story Trust, the production team considered numerous names for their heroine. Lim was immediately drawn to the name Raya, explaining that in the Malay language it means "celebration" and "evokes this joyful time where people come together around a lot of food".

Lim said that Raya's story was inspired years before the Coronavirus pandemic by the desire to not see children grow up in a world where people had become divided. She felt it was important that Raya has her father's idealistic ideas about building a perfect world and grows up wanting to protect it, and even after her heart is broken by betrayal she still maintains hope and continues to try and unify people. Lim also said that the film does not address the female protagonist in the context of fighting against not being male, but simply places her in the world as an equal. She said this was necessary to resolve the story "without worrying about whether you're a woman or not". Nguyen said that the team avoided creating a typical story of a "quiet badass", such as The Bride character played by Uma Thurman in Kill Bill: Volume 1 and Kill Bill: Volume 2, because it was not relatable to children; they thus took time developing Raya's character. For her characterisation, the team decided to find inspiration in female superheroes, but found that none had the qualities that they wanted to incorporate. Instead they drew from the Marvel character Star-Lord, due to his nuanced character and humour. Tran described Raya as "vulnerable and sad" but also "funny and witty and sarcastic". She said that Raya successfully demonstrates various types of bravery, including physical combat skills, but also the ability to recognise when her anger or trauma is blinding her judgement and overcoming that.

Raya is an 18-year-old girl who has physical strength but guards her emotions following the trauma of losing her family in childhood. Tran said that Raya knows what she wants at an early age but her trauma changes her view of the world and she ends up fighting for her beliefs. Her story arc embodies the film's main theme of trust, which is reinforced through her partnership with Sisu the dragon. After experiencing betrayal in childhood, Raya grows to become a loner with only her sidekick Tuk Tuk, a pill bug, armadillo and pug hybrid creature, as a companion. After meeting Sisu, who contradicts Raya with her optimism and undying faith in humanity, she learns to trust others again. Nguyen described this as the "secret ingredient" for saving Kumandra. Awkwafina felt that Raya's friendship with Sisu is a balance of trust, with Sisu being more trusting than Raya who learns that she needs to be less distrustful. Tran agreed that the two characters learn from each other despite having different world views and eventually change each other for the better.

Shurer said that in order to establish the three female characters, they looked into the types of female friendships presented in film, but found little to reference. Instead, they took inspiration from friends and "long lines of strong women". Nguyen stated that Raya and Namaari's relationship needed a complex history to give the story more depth, as both characters are raised to be leaders but become enemies. Raya's relationship with Sisu provides the inspiration needed to help her bond with her enemies. Lim explained that Raya wrongly believes that by waking Sisu, the dragon will be the solution to mending the broken world. Shurer said that it is really a human story about Raya and Namaari, who see each other as enemies but are also intrigued by each other. She explained that Sisu needed to die so that Raya and Namaari could work out how to fix the world without the dragon's magic: "The solution is among us. We have to learn to trust one another and get together".

For the combat scenes, the production team drew inspiration from Asian cinema, particularly Southeast Asian action films. The three fight scenes that occur between Raya and Namaari were each choreographed differently and were designed to have a specific purpose for driving forward the story and the characters' development. Early in development, the team conducted research into martial arts. Amy Smeed, head of animation, said that with Nguyen's expertise in Southeast Asian martial arts and the choreography of stunt coordinator Maggie MacDonald, they were able to design the right fighting style for the characters. By collaborating with the Story Trust, the team were able to ensure the fight sequences were authentic and realistic. Thus, Raya's fighting style is based on the Indonesian martial art Pencak silat and the combat sport Muay Thai, while her weapons style is based on the Filipino martial art Arnis.

=== Design ===
In the early design stages, the visual development team created designs for Raya and Sisu independently. They later decided that the two characters needed to be visualised together. Shiyoon Kim, art director of characters, drew them as friends hanging out together with contrasting personalities, "one stoic and the other comedic". This was early in the story development, when Raya was created as a determined swordswoman and Sisu was in human form and refused to cooperate. The antagonistic relationship between the two later changed and Raya became softer in personality.

Raya's appearance went through numerous changes during the design process, as she needed to wear clothing based on traditional Southeast Asian garments that was also non-restrictive enough for combat. Smeed highlighted that it was necessary for Raya to be agile being a warrior. In addition, her hairstyle was designed to be functional, with two braids that keep her eyesight clear. The team collaborated with Steve Arounsack, associate professor of anthropology at California State University, Stanislaus, as part of the Story Trust, who was involved in the design of Raya's hat, which is shaped similar to a stūpa.

Raya is a tall, muscular and athletic warrior, but the designers had to balance her tough exterior with her layered personality. Hall felt that warriors are difficult to relate to. Kim said that the team wanted Raya to have an authentic appearance so they researched Southeast Asia to achieve cultural specificity in her features, such as the shape of her eyes and her prominent cheekbones. According to costume designer Neysa Bové, Raya was originally going to be dressed in leather, but she would have been too hot in Kumandra's tropical climate. They decided to give her breathable draped fabric and ended up with a sabai top and dhoti pants combined with a leather jacket and boots to give the realistic appearance of a swordswoman. Co-director John Ripa commented that a cloak with a high collar and a hat were added to provide protective covering that could be gradually peeled away as the story progresses and her character develops. To represent Heart, Raya's land of origin, dragons and raindrops were used to decorate her clothing, including her jacket and cloak. Her sword is a fantasy version of an Indonesian weapon called a kris, but features an extendable blade like a whip that allows her to hook onto things.

== Appearances ==
=== Raya and the Last Dragon ===
In her youth, Raya is tested by her father, Chief Benja, for the role of the Guardian of the Dragon Gem, which gives the powers of Sisu and protects Heart from the Druun. She successfully passes and earns the title. Chief Benja invites the Tail, Talon, Spine, and Fang lands to join in a feast. During the party, Raya befriends Princess Namaari of Fang. They immediately bond and form a close friendship due to their shared interest in dragons. Namaari gives Raya a dragon-shaped pendant. In return, Raya reveals to Namaari the hidden location of the Dragon Gem. Her trust, however, is betrayed and the other nations soon begin fighting over the orb. As a result, the Dragon Gem is shattered into five pieces, awakening the Druun. During the evacuation, Raya has trouble carrying her injured father to safety. Benja sacrifices himself to give Raya a piece of the orb and throws her off the bridge into the river. As she falls, Raya sees her father get turned into a stone statue by the devouring plague. Six years later, Raya is venturing across Tail on her friend, Tuk Tuk, in the hope of finding Sisu, the last living dragon, who can help her save Kumandra and restore her father. She comes across an old shipwreck and, after placing offerings, succeeds in awakening the water dragon. Sisu agrees to help her find the remaining pieces of the Dragon Gem. Raya and Sisu travel on Tuk Tuk to the home of the Tail's chief. Avoiding the traps within, Raya carefully removes a gem piece from the remains of the chief, who died by her own traps. Namaari arrives with her army and the trio escape using a boat called "The Shrimporium", owned by a boy named Boun.

Arriving at Talon, Raya encounters a "con-baby" named Noi and her Ongis, who steal the gem fragments. She chases the thieves throughout the market and eventually catches up to them. With their help, Raya infiltrates the home of Talon's chief, Dang Hu, but finds that a new chief has been appointed. Sisu is tricked into revealing the location of the other Dragon Gem pieces, but Raya arrives on the scene, snatches a gem piece from the chief, and rescues Sisu. They return to Boun's boat with Noi and her Onjis and head to Spine. There Raya and Sisu are captured by a giant warrior named Tong, the lone survivor of his people. When Namaari and her army arrive at the front gates, Raya pleads with Tong to take her friends to safety while she fights Namaari. The Fang princess gains the upper hand during the fight, but Sisu saves Raya before Namaari can land a killing blow.

Raya reveals Sisu's secret to her friends on the boat and they agree to work together to get the final piece of the Dragon Gem from Fang. Raya plans for the team to infiltrate the kingdom, but she is persuaded to follow Sisu's plan of befriending Namaari. She decides to return Namaari's pendant as a gift and, via letter, tells her to meet her secretly in the forest. The next morning, Namaari meets with Raya and presents the final piece of the Dragon Gem, but she betrays Raya again by pulling out a crossbow. Raya unsuccessfully tries to stop Namaari from firing at Sisu, who is killed. Blinded by rage, Raya heads to Fang alone and confronts Namaari. Upon gaining the upper hand, she realizes that her rage and lack of trust caused chaos in Kumandra and Sisu's death. She spares Namaari's life and leaves to help her friends rescue Fang's citizens from the Druun. With the gem's pieces starting to lose power and the Druun approaching, Raya decides to take a leap of faith and gives her gem piece to Namaari, whereupon she is turned into stone. Her friends each do the same and turn into stone alongside Raya. Namaari chooses to bring the pieces together before becoming petrified as well. After the Dragon Gem regains its power, Raya and her friends are brought back to life. With Sisu and the dragons restored to Kumandra, Raya returns home to Heart and reunites with her father. They celebrate with the other nations of Kumandra as one united land.

=== Once Upon a Studio ===
Raya appears in the short film Once Upon a Studio. She opens the door for Mickey Mouse and tells him all the workers are not outside and is seen in the group photo.

=== Video games ===
Raya appears as a playable character in the world-building video game Disney Magic Kingdoms. She was added in 2021 during a limited time event to promote the release of Raya and the Last Dragon.

An alternate version of Raya appears as a playable character in the 2022 video game Disney Mirrorverse.

=== Theme parks ===
In September 2021, Raya made her official Disney Parks debut at Shanghai Disneyland's Happy Circle selfie spot. Beginning with the Lunar New Year Celebration in 2022, Raya made her North American debut at Disney California Adventure. In April 2022, she appeared in the 50th anniversary Main Street Electrical Parade at Disneyland.

=== Merchandise ===
Following the release of the film, Raya was inducted into the official Disney Princess line-up as its thirteenth member. Disney has merchandised the character in the form of dolls and figure sets. She has also been recreated as a Funko Pop! figure.

== Reception and legacy ==
=== Critical response ===
Richard Roeper of Chicago Sun-Times praised Raya for continuing the 21st century tradition of being another Disney Princess who is "a strong and independent female role model" and "a young warrior princess". Variety's Peter Debruge also lauded Raya for representing a new form of Disney heroine: "strong, independent and more intrepid than the young men who often fill such roles in live-action movies". In his review for the Los Angeles Times, Justin Chang wrote that Tran voiced Raya with "pluck and determination" while also noting the character's similarities to 21st century heroines such as Moana and Elsa. He wrote, "Raya has more than romance or even self-actualization on her mind," adding that, "unlike them, she doesn't even have time for a song." G. Allen Johnson of the San Francisco Chronicle said Raya brought a "fiery demeanor and righteous passion" to the film's story. Pete Hammond of Deadline compared Raya to Mulan, noting that both were "a singular young woman of great strength taking on impossible forces" but felt that, unlike Mulan, it was refreshing to have a film devoid of romance, which he thought was a modern way of portraying a female protagonist. NPR's Glen Weldon called Raya, "the most compelling, most sympathetic and most layered Disney princess in the company's long history", noting her trust issues, complexity and flawed character. Aja Romano of Vox described Raya as a "wonderful protagonist, easily one of my favorite Disney princesses by a mile", noting the similarity to Korra from the Avatar: The Last Airbender franchise and praising her rivalry with Namaari.

Den of Geek writer David Crow appreciated Raya for being a heroine displaying intelligence, humour and flaws, feeling that it was a huge leap from the typical Disney heroine who wears a long gown and needs the help of a male sidekick. Jeva Lange of The Week felt that Raya was a considerable improvement on Disney's previous attempts to portray strong female characters, which she described as "cringe-inducing". She opined that Raya "breaks with even the most progressive princess movies that Disney has made so far" by not having a love interest (unlike in Frozen and Brave), not being accompanied by a "funny" male sidekick or given "condescending 'girl power' scenes". Forbes staff writer Scott Mendelson regarded Raya's characterisation as "brave, strong, flirtatious, witty and in control of her own destiny and her own desires" but considered this representation of an "unconventional" Disney princess to be the same Disney formula since The Little Mermaid in 1989. Dale Bashir of IGN Southeast Asia described Raya as a "pretty kickass heroine", praising her depth of emotion ranging from being resourceful to vengeful. He thought that her dynamic with Namaari sets her apart from other Disney princesses like Elsa and Moana, likening their relationship to that of Adora and Catra in the She-Ra and the Princesses of Power series. Writing for Digital Spy, Gabriella Geisinger found Raya's characterisation to be "refreshing" not only for adding more diversity to the line-up of Disney princesses but also for her nuanced character, particularly her cynicism and wariness of others.

Yvette Tan writing for the BBC noted the film's Southeast Asian cultural elements and that Raya incorporates various traditional real-world elements, including wearing a hat similar to a salakot and having a sidekick named Tuk Tuk in reference to a rickshaw. At the same time, she questioned whether Raya could really embody South East Asia and its 670 million people. Writing for The Atlantic, Shirley Li appreciated that the film was more culturally authentic than previous Disney films but felt that Raya's story arc was empty, describing her as a "tourist, hopscotching from kingdom to kingdom". She felt that Raya's characterisation is a shallow representation of the filmmakers' pan-cultural research and that the film's efforts to be culturally authentic "becomes little more than window dressing". Justine Calma writing for The Verge said that Raya finally made her feel seen as Southeast Asian, having grown up watching films and television where Asian representation was rare. Kat Moon of Time described Disney's first Southeast Asian princess as a "landmark moment" for representation but highlighted that its reception, especially in the Southeast Asian community, was mixed due to concerns over its broad depiction of Southeast Asian culture.

Tran also received a positive response for voicing the character. Brian Tallerico wrote in his review for RogerEbert.com that Tran's voice acting brought "the right mix of vulnerability and strength" to the character. Brian Truitt of USA Today also praised Tran's voice performance writing, "She nicely navigates the character's lighter and darker sides, though her voice works a lot better for older Raya than her younger self." In her review for Hollywood Reporter, Inkoo Kang said Tran delivered a "pitch-perfect performance" as Raya. Benjamin Lee writing for The Guardian commented on how the "steeliness" of Trans' performance plays off against Awkwafina's comedy and enjoyed their back and forth exchanges. Hoai-Tran Bui of SlashFilm wrote that Tran was perfect as Raya and was impressed by the coolness of her portrayal in contrast to the rage she demonstrates in the combat scenes, which were "raw and unhinged". Bui felt that Raya would be "the favorite Disney Princess for a whole generation of Southeast Asian kids". David Fear of Rolling Stone felt that the film's portrayal of female empowerment was even more potent with Tran voicing the character.

=== Accolades ===
Year	Award	Category	Recipients	Result	Ref.
2022	Alliance of Women Film Journalists Awards	Best Animated Female	Kelly Marie Tran	Nominated	
2022	Annie Awards	Best Voice Acting - Feature	Kelly Marie Tran (Raya)	Nominated	
2022	Hawaii Film Critics Society Awards	Best Vocal/Motion Capture Performance	Kelly Marie Tran	Won	
2022	North Carolina Film Critics Association	Best Vocal Performance In Animation Or Mixed Media	Kelly Marie Tran	Nominated	
2021	Washington D.C. Area Film Critics Association Awards	Best Voice Performance	Kelly Marie Tran	Nominated	
2021	Women Film Critics Circle Awards	Best Animated Female	Raya	Nominated	
