= Boundin' =

- Poster for Boundin'
- Directed by: Bud Luckey
- Written by: Bud Luckey
- Produced by: Osnat Shurer
- Starring: Bud Luckey
- Narrated by: Bud Luckey
- Cinematography: Jesse Hollander
- Edited by: Steve Bloom
- Music by: Bud Luckey
- Production company: Pixar Animation Studios
- Distributed by: Buena Vista Pictures Distribution (Note: Distributed by Buena Vista Pictures Distribution through the Walt Disney Pictures banner.)
- Release dates: December 2003 (premiere); November 5, 2004 (with The Incredibles)
- Running time: 5 minutes
- Country: United States
- Language: English

Boundin' is a 2003 American animated short film, which was shown in theaters before the feature-length superhero film The Incredibles. The short is a musically narrated story about a dancing lamb, who loses his confidence after being sheared. The film was written, directed, narrated by and features the musical composition and performance of Pixar story artist Bud Luckey.

== Plot ==
In the American North Desert, a lamb’s elegant dancing is popular with the other animals. One day, lamb-shearers arrive and shear him for wool. The other animals mock his skinny, bare state and he becomes shy and loses the confidence to dance. As the lamb mourns, a benevolent jackalope comes across him, and teaches him the merits of "bounding", not just dancing (that is, getting up whenever one falls down). The lamb is converted and his joy in life is restored. The lamb's wool eventually grows back in the winter, only for it to be cut again, but his confidence is now completely unshaken and he continues to "bound."

== Voice cast ==
- Bud Luckey as Lamb, Jackalope and Narrator

== Production ==
A screenshot of one of the short film's characters, the jackalope

Writer-director Bud Luckey designed and voiced all the characters, composed the music and wrote the story. According to the director's commentary for The Incredibles, Brad Bird wanted to introduce the animated short by having Rick Dicker, (the superhero relocator from The Incredibles, also voiced by Luckey) enter a room, sit down, and pull out a bottle of "booze" and a banjo.

This is the first Pixar short with a theatrical release that included vocal performances with words (Bobby McFerrin did an acapella song for Knick Knack). All prior films included only music and sound effects.

The Cars DVD contains a version of Boundin' with Mater as the jackalope, Lightning McQueen as the lamb, and Guido as the gophers as an Easter egg.

== Theatrical and home media release ==
To qualify for the 76th Academy Awards, Pixar debuted in December 2003 special screenings of the short at the Laemmle Theatres in Los Angeles.

Boundin' was released on March 15, 2005, on The Incredibles two-disc DVD collector's release, including commentary from Bud Luckey and the short clip titled Who is Bud Luckey?. The film was also released as part of Pixar Short Films Collection, Volume 1 in 2007.

== Awards ==
- 2004: Annie Award — Best Animated Short Subject (Won)
- 2004: Academy Award — Best Animated Short Film (Nominated)
