= Osnat Shurer =

Film producer

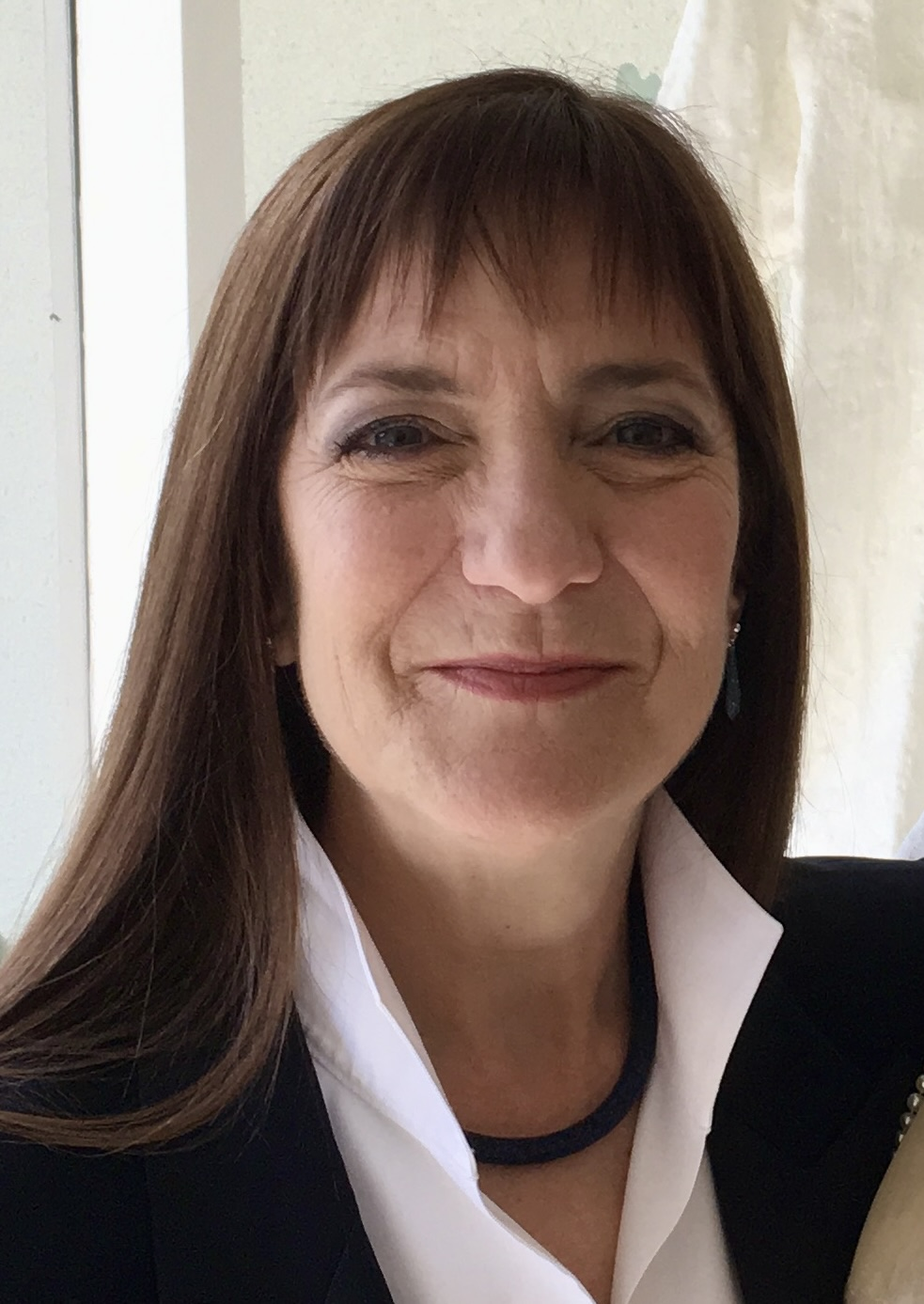
- Occupation: Producer

Osnat Shurer is a film producer who has served as co-chief creative officer of Baobab Studios since 2023. She is best known for the Walt Disney Animation Studios films Moana (2016) and Raya and the Last Dragon (2021). Shurer first joined Disney in 2012, working with filmmakers to move features and shorts through the creative process.

As producer, Shurer helps manage her films through story, script, music and casting and leads the productions’ partnerships with publicity, marketing and consumer products. Shurer also created the Oceanic Story Trust (Moana) and the Southeast Asia Story Trust (Raya and the Last Dragon) – teams of Pacific Island and Southeast Asia consultants with whom production collaborated closely throughout the making of both films.

Previously, Shurer served as the Executive Producer of the shorts group at Pixar, responsible for short films. While at Pixar, Shurer produced or executive produced a variety of hit shorts, including the Oscar®-nominated films Boundin' (2003), One Man Band (2005) and Lifted (2006).

Shurer’s duties at Pixar also included creating an in-house documentary team to produce DVD content, overseeing the development of theme park attractions, and developing and producing video shorts like Jack-Jack Attack, The Adventures of Mr. Incredible and Exploring the Reef with Jean-Michel Cousteau with visionary directors Brad Bird and Andrew Stanton.

At Pixar, Shurer was also responsible for assisting in the creation of several cutting-edge multimedia shows, including MoMA's Pixar: 20 Years of Animation, which opened in 2006 and continues to travel the world. It features Artscape, an immersive widescreen projection space that provides viewers with a unique digital artistic experience, and Zoetrope, a 3D dynamic installation using pre-cinema tech – dimensional character sculptures to simulate continuous motion.

== Early life ==
Prior to joining Pixar in 2002, Shurer produced and directed film and television in various mediums - live action, animation, live television, theater, and various interactive presentations for museums. She worked on documentaries throughout the world, in such places as India, China, Tibet, Japan, Africa and Europe, with international directors such Michelangelo Antonioni and Alfonso Cuarón.

As the child of an airline executive, Shurer grew up in many parts of the world. She received a degree in film from New York University in 1983. She resides in California.

== Charity work ==
Shurer, whose father suffered from Alzheimer's disease, is a supporter of ARTSzheimer's project.

== Filmography ==
- Raya and the Last Dragon (2021) (producer)
- Moana (2016) (producer)
- Lifted (2006) (executive producer)
- One Man Band (2005) (producer)
- Mr. Incredible and Pals (2005) (Executive producer)
- Vowellett - An Essay by Sarah Vowell (2005) (director, producer)
- Jack-Jack Attack (2005) (producer)
- Boundin' (2003) (producer)
- Exploring the Reef with Jean-Michel Cousteau (2003) (producer)

== See also ==
- Sarah Vowell
- The Incredibles - DVD extras and Easter eggs
