= One Man Band (film) =

- Original Poster
- Directed by: Andrew Jimenez; Mark Andrews
- Written by: Andrew Jimenez; Mark Andrews
- Produced by: Osnat Shurer
- Edited by: Steve Bloom
- Music by: Michael Giacchino
- Production company: Pixar Animation Studios
- Distributed by: Buena Vista Pictures Distribution (Note: Distributed by Buena Vista Pictures Distribution through the Walt Disney Pictures banner.)
- Release dates: June 11, 2005 (Annecy International Animated Film Festival); June 9, 2006 (with Cars)
- Running time: 4 minutes, 33 seconds
- Country: United States

One Man Band is a 2005 Pixar animated musical comedy short film. It debuted at the 29th Annecy International Animated Film Festival in Annecy, France, and won the Platinum Grand Prize at the Future Film Festival in Bologna, Italy. It was shown with the theatrical release of Cars.

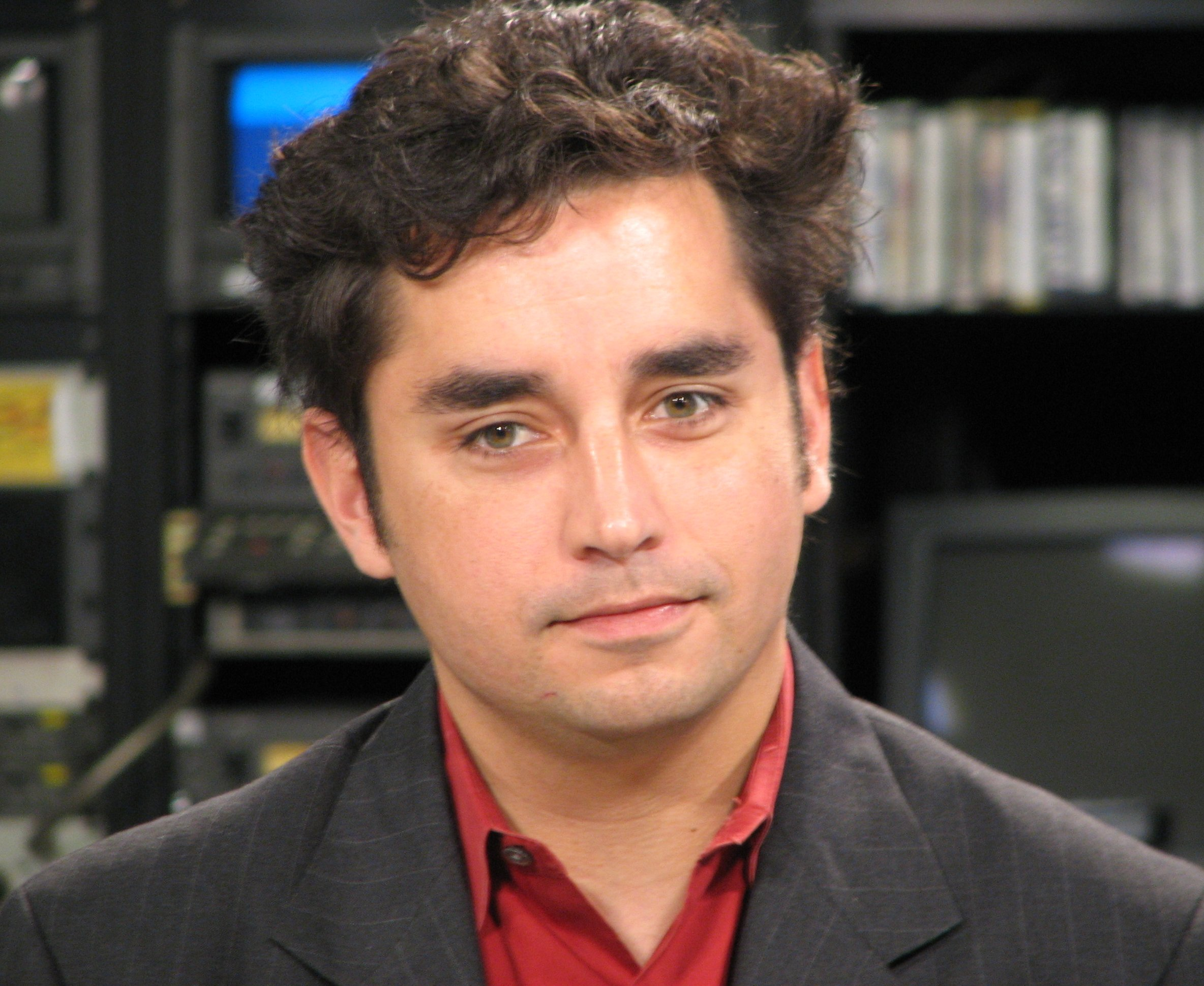
Andrew Jimenez in 2006.

It was written and directed by Andrew Jimenez and Mark Andrews and produced by Osnat Shurer, head of Pixar's Shorts group. The score was composed by Michael Giacchino. Like many Pixar shorts, it is completely free of dialogue and vocal effects, instead using music (played by the characters) and pantomime to tell the story. Unlike most Pixar shorts, which are driven solely by storyboarding and scriptwriting, the music in One Man Band was developed alongside the film's story; Giacchino collaborated extensively with the film's directors due to the music's large role.

On January 31, 2006, it was nominated for the Academy Award for Best Animated Short Film. It was included in the Animation Show of Shows in 2005.

== Plot ==
Bass, a man skilled and proud street performer, plays a routine tune on his wind and percussion instruments in a deserted Italian village square in the afternoon, waiting for a pedestrian to tip him in his rusty iron cup. Soon, he spots Tippy, a humble peasant girl clutching a big gold coin, intending to drop it in the large plaza fountain to make a wish. Treble, another man musician, seizing the opportunity, immediately plays an impromptu piece, capturing the girl's attention.

Just when Tippy is about to drop the coin into Bass' cup, Treble plays a more attractive tune on his string instruments, effectively stealing Tippy's attention, much to Bass' anger. Not to be outdone, Bass ups his ante, and Treble dares to take it even further. As the two unleash their arsenal of musical weapons, vying for Tippy's attention (or rather, tip), she cowers in their wild musical cacophony, and in the process, accidentally drops her coin, which falls down a drain and is lost in the village sewers.

Heartbroken, Tippy sniffles, but angrily demands from Treble and Bass a replacement coin for the one they made her lose. When they come up empty-handed, Tippy takes one of Treble's violins and Bass's iron cup in an attempt to get her money back by playing solo. She tunes the violin and plays it like a true virtuoso, prompting an unidentified passing pedestrian to drop a large bag of gold coins onto her cup.

Elated, Tippy hugs the bag and approaches the fountain, but not before she pulls two coins out of her bag and tempts Treble and Bass. But as they eagerly reach out to grab the coins, she tosses them into the top of the fountain, out of reach, much to their dismay as payback for their fighting over Tippy's earlier coin.

In a post-credits scene, it is nighttime, with Treble standing on Bass, trying to reach the coins. As they start to fall backward, losing their balance, the screen shows the words "The End".

== Production ==
Beginning development shortly after the completion of the superhero movie The Incredibles, One Man Band was directed by Andrew Jiminez and Mark Andrews, who had previously worked together on films such as The Iron Giant and Spider-Man. In late 2004, they were approached by Ed Catmull and asked to visit his office; according to the duo, they were initially concerned about the implications of this, but were later relieved after Catmull requested that they begin working on a brand new short film for Pixar. Jiminez and Andrews decided to create a film centered around music, a subject which they were both decidedly passionate about, and began developing a story about two musicians quarreling over the donation of a young peasant girl. The short was pitched to Pixar CEO John Lasseter and The Incredibles director Brad Bird, who quickly accepted the film for production.

== Music ==
The violinists featured in the score for the film are:

- Clayton Haslop ("Treble")
- Mark Robertson ("Tippy")

The score was recorded at the Paramount Scoring Stage in Hollywood, CA. The filmmakers used a 38-piece orchestra as well as several soloists, including the ones listed above.

The music during the credits is Pablo de Sarasate's Zigeunerweisen.

== Release ==
The film debuted on June 11, 2005, at the Annecy International Animated Film Festival in Annecy, France. It was shown with the theatrical release of Cars, which was released in the United States on June 9, 2006.

== Home media ==
Pixar included the film on the DVD release of Cars in 2006 and as part of Pixar Short Films Collection, Volume 1 in 2007.
