= Jack-Jack Attack =

2005 animated film

- Film poster
- Directed by: Brad Bird
- Written by: Brad Bird
- Story by: Mark Andrews; Rob Gibbs; Teddy Newton; Bosco Ng
- Produced by: Osnat Shurer
- Starring: Bret Parker; Bud Luckey; Eli Fucile; Jason Lee
- Cinematography: Andrew Jimenez
- Edited by: Stephen Schaffer
- Production company: Pixar Animation Studios
- Distributed by: Walt Disney Home Entertainment
- Release date: March 15, 2005 (with The Incredibles DVD)
- Running time: 4 minutes, 44 seconds
- Country: United States
- Language: English

Jack-Jack Attack is a 2005 American animated short film written and directed by Brad Bird and produced by Pixar Animation Studios. It is tied into and included on the DVD release of The Incredibles.

The idea for this short came from an idea for a scene originally considered for inclusion in The Incredibles; it was cut from the feature and subsequently expanded into this short. The short revolves around the situations between Jack-Jack and his babysitter Kari McKeen (who was hired by Violet and Dash to watch Jack-Jack) during the events of the main film.

== Plot ==
Rick Dicker, a government agent assigned to aid "supers" in maintaining their anonymity, interviews Kari McKeen about the events unfolded while she was babysitting Jack-Jack Parr, the youngest of a family of supers and son of Bob Parr, alias Mr. Incredible, and Helen Parr, alias Elastigirl. (Note: As depicted in The Incredibles (2004))

Kari begins by recalling that she received a call from Helen, who expresses reluctance about allowing Kari to babysit. Kari attempts to reassure her that she is more than capable of taking care of Jack-Jack, but the conversation is cut off by Helen's jet being fired upon. Thinking nothing is wrong and that they were simply cut-off, Kari turns her attention to Jack-Jack. She asks him if he is ready for some "neurological stimulation" and plays the third movement, the Rondo alla turca, of Mozart's Piano Sonata No. 11 for him, which results in Jack-Jack having an epiphany about his latent superpowers.

When Kari's back is turned, Jack-Jack disappears, but then reappears at the kitchen table, and then drinking a baby bottle from the refrigerator. Finding this odd, Kari tries to call Helen again. While she is leaving a message, Jack-Jack floats onto the ceiling and spills milk onto Kari's face. Kari puts him in his playpen, flipped upside-down so that he doesn't float away, and tries calling Helen again. Jack-Jack escapes the playpen and appears on a high bookshelf. Just as he falls, Kari dives in and tries to catch him, but fails when Jack-Jack passes through the floor into the laundry room. Running down to find him, Kari sees Jack-Jack passing through the walls and floating around, babbling happily, before she finally catches him.

Kari takes Jack-Jack back upstairs to the playroom, ties him to a barbell and tries to show him flashcards to calm him down. This works well until she shows him a card of a campfire, at which point he suddenly bursts into flames. Horrified, Kari picks up Jack-Jack with a pair of fireplace tongs and rushes into the bathroom, where she douses him in the bathtub filled with water.

The next day, an exhausted Kari is teetering on the verge of madness, but has since learned to anticipate and counter the spontaneous outbursts of Jack-Jack's newly emerged powers. There is a knock at the door; Kari answers it and meets Syndrome, who asks if this is the Parrs' residence. Kari thinks he is the new babysitter come to relieve her, but wonders what the "S" on his costume stands for. Syndrome claims that it stands for "Sitter" because if he calls himself "Babysitter", his uniform will have to say "BS" on it, something that would make it impossible for parents to take him seriously as a result.

Back at the interrogation, Dicker is incredulous that Kari believed Syndrome and left the baby in his care, to which Kari defensively shouts that she was not in a sound state of mind at the time and the baby was not acting normal. Dicker then asks Kari if she had told anyone else about the incident, to which she replies that she told her parents, who did not believe her and thought she was joking. As Kari expresses her wish to forget the whole event, Dicker promises that she will, and activates a device that erases her memory of the events to protect the family's superhero identity.

== Cast ==
- Bret Parker as Kari McKeen, the babysitter for Jack-Jack.
- Eli Fucile as Jack-Jack Parr, who, as Mr. Incredible and Elastigirl's infant son, initially shows no sign of super power but is later revealed to have a wide range of abilities including shape-shifting, teleporting, laser vision, elemental transmutation, flight, etc.
- Bud Luckey as Rick Dicker, the government agent overseeing the Relocation Program.
- Jason Lee as Buddy Pine / Syndrome, an evil genius who uses advanced technology to give himself superpowers. He plays along as the frantic Kari mistakes him as the "replacement babysitter".

== Music ==
The scenes of Jack Jack at home showing off his powers feature the following music by Wolfgang Amadeus Mozart (see also Mozart effect):

- Piano Sonata No. 11 in A Major K. 331 - III. Alla Turca: Allegretto
- Serenade No. 13 for Strings in G Major "Eine kleine Nachtmusik" K. 525 - IV. Finale: Allegro
- Requiem Mass in D Minor K. 626 - III. Sequentia: Dies irae

== Home video release ==
The short was included in the DVD release of The Incredibles in 2005 and Pixar Short Films Collection, Volume 1 in 2007.

== Awards ==
- 2006: Hugo Award for Best Dramatic Presentation - Short Form (Nominated)
