= Ducks Ahoy! =

1984 video game

- Commodore 64 cover art featuring the titular ducks being transported by the gondola next to the hippopotamus
- Developer: Joyce Hakansson Associates
- Publisher: CBS Software
- Programmers: Will Stein; Tom Buoye (Atari version)
- Artist: Bud Luckey
- Composer: Ed Bogas
- Platforms: Atari 8-bit, Commodore 64
- Release: NA: 1984; EU: 1984
- Genres: Action, Educational
- Mode: Single-player

Ducks Ahoy! is an educational action game for Atari 8-bit computers and the Commodore 64 released in 1984 by CBS Software. The player maneuvers a gondola around the canals of Venice to pick up ducks and ferry them to safety while avoiding a hippopotamus, who tries to capsize the boat. The title's documentation includes an activity book with a song, jokes, and craft projects related to the gameplay for parents to explore the game's learning concepts further.

Developed by Joyce Hakansson Associates, the creators aimed to develop a game that did not reward violence. Instead the team aimed to provide children an environment of learning and play that they could control. CBS Software published Ducks Ahoy! and handled its marketing, which included announcing the title at the 1984 Winter Consumer Electronics Show and releasing it in Europe.

The game was well-received by computing publications following its release. Common praise focused on the audiovisuals and documentation as well as the gameplay, which was often described as enjoyable while having educational value. Although Ducks Ahoy! was marketed to preschoolers, many critics commented that it had appeal for all ages.

== Gameplay ==
The player must collect ducks in a gondola (center) and ferry them to the beach at the top while avoiding an underwater hippopotamus (the bubbles on the right center). Game statistics are tracked in the top portion of the screen.

Ducks Ahoy! is a single-player action game aimed at preschool-aged children. The player controls a gondola from a top-down perspective to navigate it around water canals in Venice, Italy. Ducks populate the buildings along the canals and can be seen walking within the structures as they make their way to the buildings' exits. The town includes several buildings, like a palace, an observatory, and a town hall, as well as a piazza.

The player must collect the ducks before they jump into water from a building exit or the town piazza. After one or two ducks have boarded the gondola, the player must safely transport them to the beach at the top of the screen. The game tallies the total number of ducks on the beach until the player expends the four available game lives. The number of available game lives will reduce if the player allows more than ten ducks to jump into the water or they try to carry more than two ducks in the gondola. Swimming in the canals is a submerged hippopotamus (displayed as bubbles moving on the surface of the water) that the player must avoid. If the hippopotamus gets underneath the player's gondola, it will jump out of the water to capsize the boat, which results in losing a game life.

In addition to an instruction manual, the developers provided a Ducks Ahoy!-related activity book for adults to complete with their child. The activities include duck-related jokes, a duck song, and craft projects to create duck feet and bills to wear as well as to create a milk carton boat and an egg carton hippopotamus.

== Development ==
Ducks Ahoy! was developed by Joyce Hakansson Associates in Berkeley, California, and published by CBS Software. When designing educational games, the company aimed to create "low-threshold" software for children that are intuitive and free of barriers. To that end, it employed a team of programmers, artists, musicians, writers, and educators—many of which were young women—when designing games. Joyce Hakansson Associates approached development as a creative workshop with the different positions working as a group. The company's founder, Joyce Hakansson, felt this approach created a broader representation of human thinking, emotions, and aesthetic. Sandy Curtis oversaw the project while Bobbi Hutcheson, Pat Monighan, and Mark Rosen focused on the educational research associated with the game. Will Stein programmed the game with Tom Buoye handling the Atari version. Bud Luckey oversaw the art and animation, and Ed Bogas was responsible for the music.

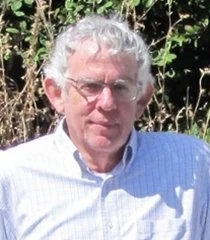
Ed Bogas handled the game's music, which was well received by the gaming press.

Omitting violence was an intentional decision in designing Ducks Ahoy!. The hippopotamus does not eat or otherwise harm the ducks, only knock over the gondola. Rather than reward aggression like shooting down planes in a shoot 'em up, the team aimed to create an environment of learning and play that a young child can control. Due to the limited memory on the game cartridges, the developers were unable to animate the ducks swimming to safety after jumping into the water. Worried about how young children might interpret this, the developers included language in the documentation to inform the player that the ducks swam to the beach safely. The developers added activities into the documentation in order to augment the software's learning concepts, so parents can explore them further with their children at home. Because Joyce Hakansson Associates had a lighthearted culture that valued creativity, the team injected humor and jokes as well. Part of its development process included regularly bringing in children from day care centers to review game concepts and playtest programs. An employee with a doctorate in childhood development would document the children's responses and interactions.

== Promotion and release ==
The game's promotion was handled by its publisher, CBS Software; Joyce Hakansson Associates did not employ marketing or public relations staff. As everyone on the development team was considered an associate, the team was the primary focus, and as such, only the team as a whole was credited with the software's creation at the time. Ducks Ahoy! was unveiled at the 1984 Winter Consumer Electronics Show in Las Vegas, Nevada in January.

A new trend at the 1984 trade show was the appearance of multiple educational video games produced by several companies. Among those companies was CBS Software, which had secured a large booth in the main hall of the convention center. The company announced partnerships with several independent software developers, including Joyce Hakansson Associates, to produce new educational titles. In addition to the partnership announcement, Joyce Hakansson Associates had Ducks Ahoy! and its other title, Seashore Hide 'n Seek, on display on the convention floor. The game's age demographic, two release platforms, and respective platform prices were also presented. The game was projected to release for the Commodore 64 in March and for Atari 8-bit home computers during the second quarter of 1984.

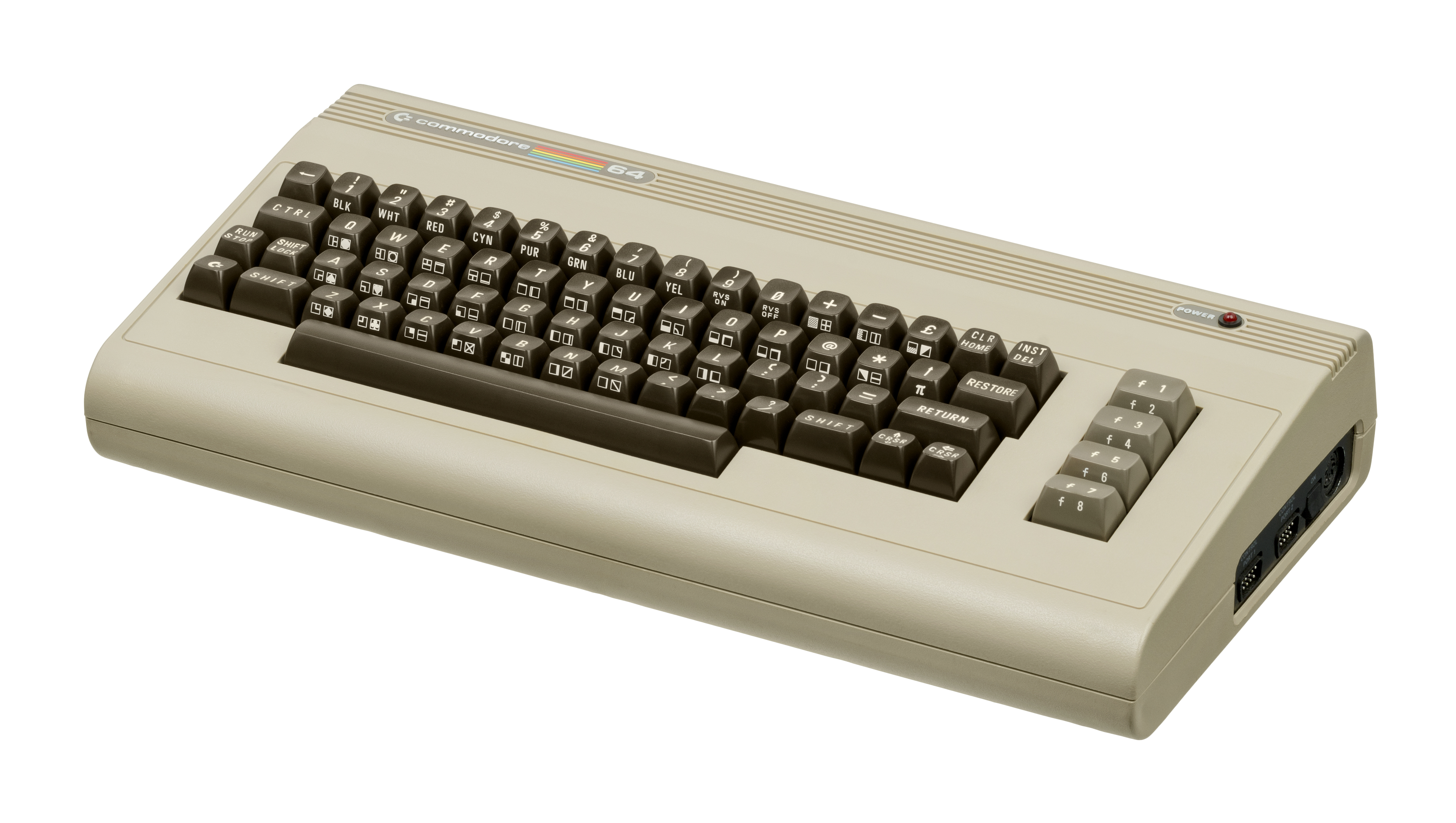
Commodore 64

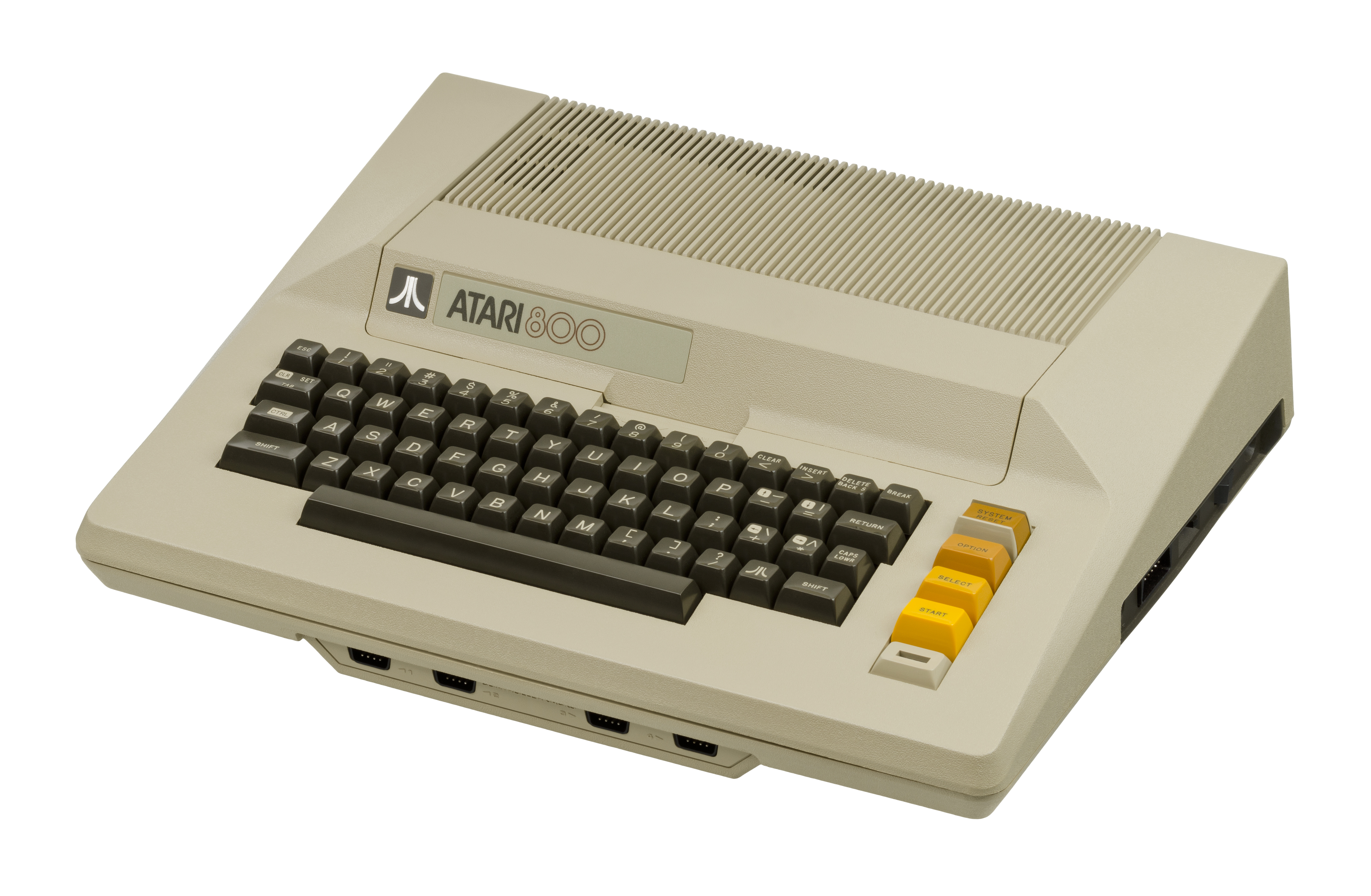
Atari 800, an Atari 8-bit computer

Ducks Ahoy! was released on two brands of home computers.

The Commodore 64 version was published in cartridge and floppy disk formats while the Atari port was available in cartridge and cassette formats. In November 1984, CBS Software signaled its intent to export its educational titles on the Commodore 64, like Ducks Ahoy!, to the United Kingdom and Europe. A few months later in January 1985, CBS announced a price reduction for several of the titles it had published, including Ducks Ahoy!.

== Reception ==
The game was met with a positive reception by contemporary computer publications. Writing for Creative Computing, Betsy Staples noted that the quality of the titles, including Ducks Ahoy!, at the Consumer Electronics Show were "uniformly high". Braden Griffin of ANALOG Computing counted the game as part of CBS Software's quality educational software, calling the publisher's commitment "refreshing". He called the game "well designed", noting that preschoolers will enjoy playing while developing logical thinking, counting, and planning skills. In describing the gameplay as simple yet clever, Antic magazine reviewer Anita Malnig praised the breadth of learning the game incorporated. She finished her review with praise for the accompanying documentation, calling it "clear" and "fun". The associate editor for Compute!'s Gazette, Fred D'Ignazio, described Ducks Ahoy! as delightful, charming, and humorous. In describing the gameplay, he called it "enjoyable" and noted the extra layer of challenge the hippopotamus added. Writing for MicroTimes magazine, Ute Elisabeth Van Nuys called it "delightful" and praised it for subtly teaching prediction, strategic planning, and timing to children. Antic magazine staff included the game in their annual shopping guide in December 1985 as one of the year's best products for the holiday season, noting that the title helps with fine motor coordination and counting.

Many publications praised Ducks Ahoy!'s audiovisuals. Griffin stated that the music and visuals—which he called "pleasing" and "lively", respectively—added to the title's appeal. Similarly, The Video Game Update's editor Celeste Dolan felt that the "colorful graphics" and "good music" combined with the scenario to make a successful game. Malnig called the graphics "crisp" and the ducks' waddling "very amusing". D'Ignazio lauded the cohesive appeal of the game's packaging and in-game visuals. He further praised the audiovisuals for being substantive and detailed yet not overwhelming or distracting. When recommending it for the 1984 holiday season, Antic staff cited the "crisp graphics" and "cute sound effects" among the positives.

Columnists also noted the game's wide appeal across demographics. Griffin wrote that despite the younger target age, children of all ages would enjoy the game. Malnig noted that younger children could practice fine motor coordination and counting while older children could work on planning routes and predicting outcomes. She lauded the gameplay for being able to captivate both children and adults. Van Nuys commented how enjoyable the game is for toddlers and wrote that the game has mass appeal beyond its targeted demographic.
