= Sisu (Raya and the Last Dragon) =

Fictional character from Raya and the Last Dragon

- Raya and the Last Dragon character
- Sisu in her dragon form
- First appearance: Raya and the Last Dragon (2021)
- Created by: Adele Lim
- Voiced by: Awkwafina
- Inspired by: Nāga

In-universe information
- Full name: Sisudatu
- Race: Dragon (Water Dragon)
- Gender: Female
- Family: Pengu (brother); Pranee (sister); Amba (sister); Jagan (brother)

Sisu Datu, also known by her nickname Sisu, is an anthropomorphic dragon who appears in Walt Disney Animation Studios' animated feature film Raya and the Last Dragon (2021). Created by screenwriter Adele Lim, she is voiced by American actress and rapper Awkwafina.

Inspired by the Nāga from Hinduism, Buddhism and Jainism, she is depicted as the last dragon in the land of Kumandra. To get rid of the Druun, monsters who once threatened Kumandra, Sisu supposedly compressed her magic into a gem. Humanity later fought over the gem and broke it, leading to Princess of Heart Raya seeking her help to banish the Druun again. Sisu and Raya travel across Kumandra to find the gem pieces, making new friends along the way, and learning the importance of trust.

Sisu has received generally positive reviews from critics, who praised her design, sense of forgiveness, self-deprecating comedy, and contribution to the message.

== Development ==
=== Origins and conception ===
Sisu is inspired by the Nāga from Hinduism, Buddhism and Jainism.

=== Voice ===
Awkwafina voices Sisu (Sisudatu). During the COVID-19 pandemic, Disney sent her an audio production tent for her home recording acoustics. Shurer explained: "When we met Awkwafina, we knew, first of all, that she's an incredible actress with a wide range, and with a very professional and disciplined approach to acting. But Awkwafina fit the dragon that we were looking for— some combination of wisdom and emotion and humor. She brings all those three things together in some magical potion." Director Carlos López Estrada called her something "amazing" in the film due to her ability to perform both comedy and drama. Director Don Hall stated he could not imagine somebody other than Awkwafina as Sisu. Estrada said she improvised many of the scenes and "brought [Sisu] to life in a way that was very exciting to watch."

=== Design and personality ===
Story artist Luis Logam stated the directors want Sisu to "completely throw Raya off guard and out of her comfort zone" during their first meeting. Logam was encouraged to add a lot of physicality to Sisu's movement. The directors described Sisu as "funny [and] self-deprecating".

==== Outward appearance ====
Unlike most dragons from Disney films, Sisu does not have wings or a bulky physique. She was inspired by the Southeast Asian dragons known as the Nāga which were tied to the element of water. Similar to depictions of dragons in China, Sisu's body is long and slender. Her form is made up of multiple elements of other animals. Although Sisu's design was based on the Nāga which are often depicted being covered in scales, Sisu's design on the other hand depicts her as having no scales and having fur cover her whole body, her head is similar to the mane of a lion while her tail has dorsal fins. Her teeth, feet and claws are similar to that of a tiger which is a trait from Chinese mythology. However, unlike typical Chinese dragons, she lacks long barbels. In the film, Sisu possesses bioluminescence. The directors wanted Sisu to look "breathtakingly beautiful". Her hair was "meant to make her feel light and ethereal, through its almost magically weightless motion, which accentuates her being divine and mystical." Steve Arounsack, a visual anthropologist and consultant on the film, was collaborated with on Sisu's design. Awkwafina stated she saw parts of her teeth and eyes in Sisu.

== Appearances ==
=== Merchandise ===
Following the release of Raya and the Last Dragon, Disney released Sisu dolls in both human and dragon form. In a Kumandra figure play set, Sisu was featured. A Sisu plushy was also released.

== Reception ==
Vulture called Sisu the "angel on [Raya's] shoulder urging her toward forgiveness". Common Sense Media praised her power, courage sweetness, forgiveness, trust and empathy. Rolling Stone writer David Fear lauded Sisu's sassiness, furriness, snarkiness and funniness. Ben Travis of Empire complimented the effects of her mane. RogerEbert.com's Brian Tallerico commended the "gorgeous" design of Sisu. Writing for NPR, Justin Chang said Sisu was "all feel-good vibes". Vox described her as being a "fun" magical sidekick: "she's wisecracking but earnest, rambunctious but wise, and her loving nature is a good foil for Raya". Firstpost stated she had a "mix of self-deprecating comedy, occasional wisdom and a get-out-of-jail-free card."
