= Sanzo =

American sparkling water brand

- Type: Sparkling water
- Introduced: 2019; 7 years ago
- Website: drinksanzo.com

Sanzo is an American brand of sparkling water flavored with Asian fruits. These flavors include lychee, yuzu, pomelo, calamansi, mango, and formerly Asian pear.

== History ==
Sanzo was founded in 2019 by Sandro Roco, a Filipino American who grew up in the New York City metro area. Roco had the idea to start the company in mid-2018, citing a lack of Asian-inspired beverages in American grocery markets. Roco stated, "Crazy Rich Asians was the number one film at the box office, Korean pop was hitting a fever pitch, and the influence of Asian food and culture was really starting to make its mark on American culture. But when I walked the beverage aisles at both markets like Whole Foods and H-Mart, I didn’t feel there was anything properly capturing this shift in culture." Sanzo's initial flavors were calamansi, lychee, and mango.

In August 2020, Sanzo raised US$1.3 million in seed funding.

In February 2022, Sanzo announced a new yuzu flavor and shared that they had raised $10 million in Series A funding led by CircleUp Growth Partners. In March 2022, they became available in Whole Foods nationwide, which Roco cited as when "things started getting pretty interesting for us." Later that year, Sanzo partnered with professional basketball player Jeremy Lin to release a limited Asian pear flavor for the 10th anniversary of "Linsanity", a cultural phenomenon in response to Lin's performance during the 2011–12 NBA season.

In February 2023, Sanzo announced a new pomelo flavor. As of March 2023, the company had 18 employees and their drinks were available at Whole Foods Market, Target, and Panda Express, among other retailers.

In 2025, Sanzo discontinued their sugar free drinks and began adding sugar to their beverages.
