= Baobab Studios =

American independent animation studio

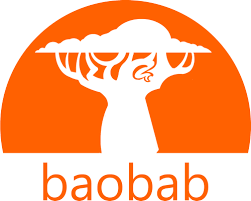
- Type: Private
- Industry: Computer animation; Virtual reality; Film production
- Founded: 2015; 11 years ago in San Francisco Bay Area, California, U.S.
- Founder: Maureen Fan; Eric Darnell; Larry Cutler
- Headquarters: San Francisco Bay Area, California, U.S.
- Key people: Maureen Fan (CEO); Eric Darnell (CCO); Larry Cutler (CTO)
- Products: Momoguro, The Witchverse, Intercats
- Website: baobabstudios.com

Baobab Studios is an American independent animation studio based in the San Francisco Bay Area, California. It is known for creating transmedia franchises such as Momoguro, The Witchverse, and Intercats.

== History ==
Baobab Studios was founded in 2015 by Maureen Fan, Eric Darnell, and Larry Cutler. Prior to co-founding the studio, Fan served as Vice President of Games at Zynga overseeing the FarmVille franchise, Darnell directed DreamWorks Animation's first film Antz and wrote and directed all four Madagascar films. Cutler worked in animation technology at Pixar and DreamWorks Animation. Cutler was a technical director on Shrek the Third, How to Train Your Dragon, Megamind.

Since its founding, Baobab Studios has received investment from Comcast Ventures, Disney, Horizons Ventures, 20th Century Studios, Shari Redstone's Advancit Capital, TCG of Peter Chernin, HTC, Samsung, Mark Pincus, and Peter Thiel.

== Franchises ==
Baobab is known for developing transmedia franchises through GenZ platforms. Its universes have been adapted into films by Disney, television series for streaming services such as Disney+ and Max, books published by Penguin Random House and MacMillan, and video games on platforms including Roblox, Metaverse, and Oculus.

In 2021, it was announced that Disney Branded Television and Baobab Studios would work on The Witchverse, an animated anthology series for Disney+, based on Baobab's VR experience and animated short Baba Yaga. Disney Television Animation is overseeing the development, with Eric Darnell, serving as executive producer. In 2022, Baobab and Disney began work on Intercats, an animated workplace comedy, with Pamela Ribon as the screenwriter. In 2023, Baobab began development of an animated television series and Roblox game based on Momoguro.

== Virtual reality ==
Over the years, Baobab has released VR experiences such as Invasion! (2016), Asteroids! (2017), Crow: The Legend (2017), Jack (2018), Bonfire (2019), Namoo (2021), and Baba Yaga (2021).

== Social work ==
In 2018, Baobab Studios established the GenIndigenous Youth Fellowship with Native Americans in Philanthropy (NAP), Vision Maker Media, and Longhouse Media.

== Management ==
Baobab Studios' advisors comprise Glen Keane, an animator associated with The Little Mermaid, Beauty and the Beast, Aladdin, Pocahontas, Tarzan, and Tangled; Mireille Soria, co-president of DreamWorks Animation; Alvy Ray Smith, co-founder of Pixar Animation Studios; Ed Catmull, co-founder of Pixar Animation Studios and former Disney President; Glenn Entis, co-founder of Pacific Data Images and former CEO of DreamWorks Interactive; and Kevin Lin, co-founder and former COO of Twitch.

== Awards and recognition ==
Baobab Studios has received multiple awards and recognition. In 2018, it was named as the Fast Company's Most Innovative Company.

Baobab has received ten Emmy Awards for its productions, including recognition for Crow: The Legend and an Emmy for Baba Yaga's interactive media.

Baobab has received three Annie Awards. In 2018, its production Crow: The Legend received the Annie Award for Best Virtual Reality Production. In 2019, Bonfire received the Annie Award for Best VR. In 2021, Baobab's Namoo received the Annie Award for Best Special Production and in 2022 it was shortlisted for the Oscar.
