= List of Pixar films =

Logo for Pixar Animation Studios used since 1995

Pixar Animation Studios is an American computer animation film production company based in Emeryville, California, United States. As of 2026, Pixar has produced 31 feature films, which were all released by Walt Disney Studios Motion Pictures through the Walt Disney Pictures banner. Moreover, Pixar's first feature film was Toy Story (which was also the first CGI-animated feature ever theatrically released) on November 22, 1995, and its latest film was Toy Story 5 on June 19, 2026.

Its upcoming slate of films includes Gatto in 2027, Ghost Market and Incredibles 3 in 2028, and Coco 2 in 2029.

== Films ==
All films listed are co-produced by Walt Disney Pictures and released by Buena Vista Pictures Distribution (1995–2007)/Walt Disney Studios Motion Pictures (2008–present).

=== Released ===
#	Film	Release date	Director(s)	Writer(s)		Producer(s)	Composer(s)
#	Film	Release date	Director(s)	Story	Screenplay	Producer(s)	Composer(s)
1	Toy Story	November 22, 1995	John Lasseter	John Lasseter, Pete Docter, Andrew Stanton & Joe Ranft	Joss Whedon, Andrew Stanton, Joel Cohen & Alec Sokolow	Bonnie Arnold & Ralph Guggenheim	Randy Newman
2	A Bug's Life	November 25, 1998	John Lasseter Co-director: Andrew Stanton	John Lasseter, Andrew Stanton & Joe Ranft	Andrew Stanton, Donald McEnery & Bob Shaw	Darla K. Anderson & Kevin Reher	Randy Newman
3	Toy Story 2	November 24, 1999	John Lasseter Co-directors: Ash Brannon & Lee Unkrich	John Lasseter, Pete Docter, Ash Brannon & Andrew Stanton	Andrew Stanton, Rita Hsiao, Doug Chamberlin & Chris Webb	Helene Plotkin & Karen Robert Jackson	Randy Newman
4	Monsters, Inc.	November 2, 2001	Pete Docter Co-directors: Lee Unkrich & David Silverman	Pete Docter, Jill Culton, Jeff Pidgeon & Ralph Eggleston	Andrew Stanton & Dan Gerson	Darla K. Anderson	Randy Newman
5	Finding Nemo	May 30, 2003	Andrew Stanton Co-director: Lee Unkrich	Andrew Stanton	Andrew Stanton, Bob Peterson & David Reynolds	Graham Walters	Thomas Newman
6	The Incredibles	November 5, 2004	Brad Bird			John Walker	Michael Giacchino
7	Cars	June 9, 2006	John Lasseter Co-director: Joe Ranft	John Lasseter, Joe Ranft & Jorgen Klubien	Dan Fogelman, John Lasseter, Joe Ranft, Kiel Murray, Phil Lorin & Jorgen Klubien	Darla K. Anderson	Randy Newman
8	Ratatouille	June 29, 2007	Brad Bird Co-director: Jan Pinkava	Jan Pinkava, Jim Capobianco & Brad Bird	Brad Bird	Brad Lewis	Michael Giacchino
9	WALL-E	June 27, 2008	Andrew Stanton	Andrew Stanton & Pete Docter	Andrew Stanton & Jim Reardon	Jim Morris	Thomas Newman
10	Up	May 29, 2009	Pete Docter Co-director: Bob Peterson	Pete Docter, Bob Peterson & Tom McCarthy	Bob Peterson & Pete Docter	Jonas Rivera	Michael Giacchino
11	Toy Story 3	June 18, 2010	Lee Unkrich	John Lasseter, Andrew Stanton & Lee Unkrich	Michael Arndt	Darla K. Anderson	Randy Newman
12	Cars 2	June 24, 2011	John Lasseter Co-director: Brad Lewis	John Lasseter, Brad Lewis & Dan Fogelman	Ben Queen	Denise Ream	Michael Giacchino
13	Brave	June 22, 2012	Mark Andrews & Brenda Chapman Co-director: Steve Purcell	Brenda Chapman	Mark Andrews, Steve Purcell, Brenda Chapman & Irene Mecchi	Katherine Sarafian	Patrick Doyle
14	Monsters University	June 21, 2013	Dan Scanlon	Dan Gerson, Robert L. Baird & Dan Scanlon		Kori Rae	Randy Newman
15	Inside Out	June 19, 2015	Pete Docter Co-director: Ronnie del Carmen	Pete Docter & Ronnie del Carmen	Pete Docter, Meg LeFauve & Josh Cooley	Jonas Rivera	Michael Giacchino
16	The Good Dinosaur	November 25, 2015	Peter Sohn	Peter Sohn, Erik Benson, Meg LeFauve, Kelsey Mann & Bob Peterson	Meg LeFauve	Denise Ream	Mychael & Jeff Danna
17	Finding Dory	June 17, 2016	Andrew Stanton Co-director: Angus MacLane	Andrew Stanton	Andrew Stanton & Victoria Strouse	Lindsey Collins	Thomas Newman
18	Cars 3	June 16, 2017	Brian Fee	Brian Fee, Ben Queen, Eyal Podell & Jonathan E. Stewart	Kiel Murray, Bob Peterson & Mike Rich	Kevin Reher	Randy Newman
19	Coco	November 22, 2017	Lee Unkrich Co-director: Adrian Molina	Lee Unkrich, Jason Katz, Matthew Aldrich & Adrian Molina	Adrian Molina & Matthew Aldrich	Darla K. Anderson	Michael Giacchino (Note: Songs by Kristen Anderson-Lopez, Robert Lopez, Germaine Franco & Adrian Molina)
20	Incredibles 2	June 15, 2018	Brad Bird			John Walker & Nicole Paradis Grindle	Michael Giacchino
21	Toy Story 4	June 21, 2019	Josh Cooley	John Lasseter, Andrew Stanton, Josh Cooley, Valerie LaPointe, Rashida Jones, Will McCormack, Martin Hynes & Stephany Folsom	Andrew Stanton & Stephany Folsom	Mark Nielsen, Jonas Rivera & Galyn Susman	Randy Newman
22	Onward	March 6, 2020	Dan Scanlon	Dan Scanlon, Keith Bunin & Jason Headley		Kori Rae	Mychael & Jeff Danna
23	Soul	December 25, 2020	Pete Docter Co-director: Kemp Powers	Pete Docter, Mike Jones & Kemp Powers		Dana Murray	Trent Reznor & Atticus Ross (Note: Jazz compositions and arrangements by Jon Batiste)
24	Luca	June 18, 2021	Enrico Casarosa	Enrico Casarosa, Jesse Andrews & Simon Stephenson	Jesse Andrews & Mike Jones	Andrea Warren	Dan Romer
25	Turning Red	March 11, 2022	Domee Shi	Domee Shi, Julia Cho & Sarah Streicher	Julia Cho & Domee Shi	Lindsey Collins	Ludwig Göransson (Note: Songs by Billie Eilish & Finneas O'Connell)
26	Lightyear	June 17, 2022	Angus MacLane	Angus MacLane, Matthew Aldrich & Jason Headley	Jason Headley & Angus MacLane	Galyn Susman	Michael Giacchino
27	Elemental	June 16, 2023	Peter Sohn	Peter Sohn, John Hoberg, Kat Likkel & Brenda Hsueh	John Hoberg, Kat Likkel & Brenda Hsueh	Denise Ream	Thomas Newman
28	Inside Out 2	June 14, 2024	Kelsey Mann	Kelsey Mann & Meg LeFauve	Meg LeFauve & Dave Holstein	Mark Nielsen	Andrea Datzman (Note: Original Inside Out themes by Michael Giacchino)
29	Elio	June 20, 2025	Madeline Sharafian, Domee Shi & Adrian Molina	Adrian Molina, Madeline Sharafian, Domee Shi & Julia Cho	Julia Cho, Mark Hammer & Mike Jones	Mary Alice Drumm	Rob Simonsen
30	Hoppers	March 6, 2026	Daniel Chong	Daniel Chong & Jesse Andrews	Jesse Andrews	Nicole Paradis Grindle	Mark Mothersbaugh
31	Toy Story 5	June 19, 2026	Andrew Stanton Co-director: Kenna Harris	Andrew Stanton	Andrew Stanton & Kenna Harris	Lindsey Collins & Jessica Choi	Randy Newman

=== Upcoming ===
Film	Release date	Director(s)	Writer(s)		Producer(s)	Composer(s)	Production status	Ref.
Film	Release date	Director(s)	Story	Screenplay	Producer(s)	Composer(s)	Production status	Ref.
Gatto	March 5, 2027	Enrico Casarosa	TBA	Enrico Casarosa, Tripper Clancy & Andy Siara	Andrea Warren	Dario Marianelli	In production	
Ghost Market	March 10, 2028	Trevor Jimenez & Jesse Andrews	TBA	TBA	Becky Neiman-Cobb	TBA	In production	
Incredibles 3	June 16, 2028	Peter Sohn	Brad Bird	Brad Bird	Dana Murray	TBA	In production	
Coco 2	November 21, 2029	Lee Unkrich Co-director: Adrian Molina	TBA	TBA	Mark Nielsen	TBA	In production	

==== In-development projects ====
In November 2025, Madeline Sharafian revealed in an interview that she began developing a new feature film based on her own original idea.

In March 2026, it was reported that Domee Shi was working on a new original film that is described as a "rebellion against the traditional Disney musical".

A third film in the Monsters, Inc. franchise was reported to be in development by several sources in March 2026.

=== Production cycle ===
In July 2013, then–Pixar president Edwin Catmull said that the studio planned to release one original film each year, and a sequel every other year, as part of a strategy to release "one and a half movies a year". On July 3, 2016, Pixar's current president Jim Morris announced that the studio might be moving away from sequels after Toy Story 4 and Pixar was only developing original ideas with five films in development at the time of the announcement.

In February 2026, Pete Docter estimated that the studio had eight films in various stages of production.

=== Cancelled projects ===
==== Monkey ====
Back when Pixar was still a part of Lucasfilm in 1985, it started pre-production on a film called Monkey. Pixar would later abandon the project due to technical limitations.

==== The Yellow Car ====
In 1995, Jorgen Klubien started writing a script for a film titled The Yellow Car. He wrote the first draft of the script with Joe Ranft. Then in 1998, the film was scrapped in favor of Toy Story 2 (1999). In 2001, The Yellow Car would eventually be reworked into Cars (2006).

==== 1906 ====
In 2005, Pixar began collaborating with Disney and Warner Bros. Pictures on a live-action film adaptation of James Dalessandro's novel 1906, with Brad Bird announced as the director. It would have marked Pixar's first involvement in a live-action production and its first collaboration with a major production company other than Disney. Disney and Pixar left the project due to script problems and an estimated budget of $200 million, and it is in limbo at Warner Bros. However, in June 2018, Bird mentioned the possibility of adapting the novel as a TV series, and the earthquake sequence as a live-action feature film.

==== Newt ====
A Pixar film titled Newt (which would have been Gary Rydstrom's feature directorial debut) was announced in April 2008, with a release date in 2011. Its release was later pushed out to 2012, and by early 2010 was canceled. John Lasseter noted that the film's proposed plot line was similar to another film, Blue Sky Studios' Rio (2011). In a March 2014 interview, Pixar's then-president Edwin Catmull said that Newt was an idea that was not working in pre-production. When the project was passed to Pete Docter, the director of Monsters, Inc. and Up, he pitched a completely different idea that Pixar thought was better, and that concept became Inside Out.

==== ShadeMaker ====
In 2010, Henry Selick formed a joint venture with Pixar called Cinderbiter Productions, which was to exclusively produce stop-motion films. Its first project under the deal, a film titled ShadeMaker was set to be released on October 4, 2013, but was canceled in August 2012 due to creative differences. Selick was given the option to shop ShadeMaker (now titled The Shadow King) to other studios. Selick later stated in interviews that the film suffered from interference from John Lasseter who Selick claimed came in and constantly changed elements of the script and production that ended up raising the budget that would lead to its cancelation. By November 2022, it was announced that Selick had reacquired the rights for The Shadow King from Disney and that he might revive the project.

==== The Graveyard Book ====
In April 2012, Walt Disney Pictures acquired the rights and hired Henry Selick, director of The Nightmare Before Christmas and the film adaptation of Gaiman's novel Coraline, to direct The Graveyard Book. The film was moved to Pixar as a stop-motion production, which would have been the company's first adapted work. After the studio and Selick parted ways over scheduling and development, it was announced in January 2013 that Ron Howard would direct the film.

In July 2022, it was announced that Marc Forster would direct the adaptation with a screenplay by David Magee under Walt Disney Studios. Later that year, Neil Gaiman stated that he has no involvement with the film. In September 2024, it was reported that the production had been halted due to a variety of factors including sexual misconduct allegations against Gaiman.

==== Blade ====
Following the release of Brave, director Mark Andrews was developing an unannounced original film under the working title Blade. Described as a "big action-adventure fantasy epic" that would utilize motion capture versus story boarding for pre-visualization, the project was cancelled in 2018 and Andrews left Pixar shortly after.

==== BeFri ====
Purl director Kristen Lester was developing an unannounced original film titled BeFri by November 2019, where "BeFri" was short for "best friends". Based on Lester's childhood experience with a platonic breakup, the film was specifically about "two teenage girls who were once besties but find themselves drifting apart after learning that their favorite, Sailor Moon-style TV show is real and that they need to set out on a universe-spanning quest to save humanity." The film's creative team included the screenplay co-written by Blaise Hemingway (who also helped write the screenplay for the 2021 film Clifford the Big Red Dog), the film edited by Nicholas C. Smith, and 50 other Pixar employees; it went through four iterations but was ultimately cancelled in 2023 because it was too female-skewing and didn't appeal to boys enough.

==== Circle Seven Animation projects ====
When the now-defunct Circle Seven Animation was open, there were plans for sequels to Finding Nemo (for which Pixar made its own sequel, Finding Dory) and Monsters, Inc. (for which Pixar made a prequel, Monsters University), as well as a different version of Toy Story 3. The Monsters, Inc. sequel would have been Monsters, Inc. 2: Lost in Scaradise and would have followed Mike and Sulley as they arrive to the human world through Boo's old door, only to find she has moved. Pixar's later sequels had no basis in Circle Seven's projects, and were created completely separately.

==== Other cancelled projects ====
Teddy Newton (director of the short Day & Night), Brian Fee, Lee Unkrich, Dan Scanlon, Rosana Sullivan (director of the SparkShorts film Kitbull), and Aphton Corbin (director of the SparkShorts film Twenty Something) worked on untitled original films that were shelved before their announcement. (Note: Attributed to multiple references.) The screenplay for Newton's film was written by Derek Connolly. Unkrich and Fee left Pixar in 2019 and 2023, respectively, although the former later returned to Pixar by 2025 to helm Coco 2.

=== Co-production ===
Buzz Lightyear of Star Command: The Adventure Begins is an animated direct-to-video film and a spin-off of the Toy Story franchise produced by Walt Disney Television Animation with an opening sequence created by Pixar. The film was released on August 8, 2000, and led to a television series called, Buzz Lightyear of Star Command with Pixar creating the CGI portion of the opening theme.

A Spark Story is a feature-length documentary film co-produced by Pixar, Disney+, and Supper Club. The film centers on directors Aphton Corbin and Louis Gonzales as they work to bring their SparkShorts projects Twenty Something and Nona to the screen.

=== Collaboration ===
Pixar assisted in the English localization of several Studio Ghibli films, mainly those from Hayao Miyazaki.

Pixar was brought on board to fine tune the script of The Muppets. The film was released on November 23, 2011.

Pixar assisted with the story development for The Jungle Book, as well as providing suggestions for the film's end credits sequence. The film was released on April 15, 2016. Additional special thanks credit was given to Mark Andrews.

Mary Poppins Returns includes a sequence combining live-action and traditional hand-drawn animation. The animation was supervised by Ken Duncan and James Baxter. Over 70 animators specializing in hand-drawn 2D animation from Pixar and Walt Disney Animation Studios were recruited for the sequence. The film was released on December 19, 2018.

=== Related productions ===
Planes is a spin-off of the Cars franchise, produced by the now defunct DisneyToon Studios and co-written and executive produced by John Lasseter. The film was conceived from the short film Air Mater, which introduces aspects of Planes and ends with a hint of the film. It was released on August 9, 2013. A sequel, Planes: Fire & Rescue, was released on July 18, 2014. A Planes spin-off film was announced in July 2017, with a release date of April 12, 2019, but was removed from the release schedule on March 1, 2018. The film was eventually canceled when DisneyToon Studios was shut down on June 28, 2018.

Ralph Breaks the Internet, produced by Walt Disney Animation Studios and co-executive produced by Lasseter, features Kelly Macdonald reprising her role as Merida from Brave, as well as a cameo from Tim Allen reprising his role (via archive recordings) as Buzz Lightyear from the Toy Story franchise, and a sample of Patrick Doyle's score from Brave. The film, released on November 21, 2018, also features many visual references to Pixar and its films. Additionally, Andrew Stanton received a "Narrative Guru" credit.

== Reception ==
=== Box office ===
Year	Film	Budget	Box office gross			Ref.
Year	Film	Budget	U.S. and Canada	Other territories	Worldwide	Ref.
1995	Toy Story	$30 million	$229,947,062	$171,210,907	$401,157,969	
1998	A Bug's Life	$40–120 million	$162,798,565	$200,460,294	$363,258,859	
1999	Toy Story 2	$90 million	$245,852,179	$265,506,097	$511,358,276	
2001	Monsters, Inc.	$115 million	$255,873,250	$272,900,000	$528,773,250	
2003	Finding Nemo	$94 million	$339,714,978	$531,300,000	$871,014,978	
2004	The Incredibles	$92–145 million	$261,441,092	$370,001,000	$631,442,092	
2006	Cars	$120 million	$244,082,982	$217,900,167	$461,983,149	
2007	Ratatouille	$150 million	$206,445,654	$417,280,431	$623,726,085	
2008	WALL-E	$180 million	$223,808,164	$297,503,696	$521,311,860	
2009	Up	$175 million	$293,004,164	$442,094,918	$735,099,082	
2010	Toy Story 3	$200 million	$415,004,880	$651,964,823	$1,066,969,703	
2011	Cars 2	$200 million	$191,452,396	$368,400,000	$559,852,396	
2012	Brave	$185 million	$237,283,207	$301,700,000	$538,983,207	
2013	Monsters University	$200 million	$268,492,764	$475,066,843	$743,559,607	
2015	Inside Out	$175 million	$356,461,711	$501,149,463	$857,611,174	
2015	The Good Dinosaur	$175–200 million	$123,087,120	$209,120,551	$332,207,671	
2016	Finding Dory	$200 million	$486,295,561	$542,275,328	$1,028,570,889	
2017	Cars 3	$175 million	$152,901,115	$231,029,541	$383,930,656	
2017	Coco	$175–225 million	$210,460,015	$604,181,157	$814,641,172	
2018	Incredibles 2	$200 million	$608,581,744	$634,223,615	$1,242,805,359	
2019	Toy Story 4	$200 million	$434,038,008	$639,356,585	$1,073,394,593	
2020	Onward	$200 million	$61,555,145	$80,384,897	$141,940,042	
2020	Soul	$200 million	$946,154 (Note: Released in North American cinemas in 2024, after originally being released on Disney+)	$120,957,731	$121,903,885	
2021	Luca	—N/a	$1,324,302	$49,788,012	$51,112,314	
2022	Turning Red	$175 million	$1,399,001	$20,414,357	$21,813,358	
2022	Lightyear	$200 million	$118,307,188	$108,118,232	$226,425,420	
2023	Elemental	$200 million	$154,426,697	$342,017,611	$496,444,308	
2024	Inside Out 2	$200 million	$652,980,194	$1,045,883,622	$1,698,863,816	
2025	Elio	$150–200+ million	$72,987,454	$80,810,682	$153,798,136	
2026	Hoppers	$150 million	$166,010,783	$223,537,000	$389,547,783	
2026	Toy Story 5	$250 million	$478,817,306	$657,611,596	$1,136,428,783	

=== Critical and public response ===
Critical and public response of Pixar films
Film	Critical		Public
Film	Rotten Tomatoes	Metacritic	CinemaScore
Toy Story	100% (163 reviews)	96 (26 reviews)	A
A Bug's Life	92% (90 reviews)	78 (23 reviews)	A
Toy Story 2	100% (171 reviews)	88 (34 reviews)	A+
Monsters, Inc.	96% (191 reviews)	79 (35 reviews)	A+
Finding Nemo	99% (266 reviews)	90 (38 reviews)	A+
The Incredibles	97% (248 reviews)	90 (41 reviews)	A+
Cars	75% (201 reviews)	73 (39 reviews)	A
Ratatouille	96% (251 reviews)	96 (37 reviews)	A
WALL-E	95% (257 reviews)	95 (39 reviews)	A
Up	98% (291 reviews)	88 (37 reviews)	A+
Toy Story 3	98% (313 reviews)	92 (39 reviews)	A
Cars 2	40% (216 reviews)	57 (38 reviews)	A−
Brave	78% (255 reviews)	69 (37 reviews)	A
Monsters University	80% (201 reviews)	65 (41 reviews)	A
Inside Out	98% (385 reviews)	94 (55 reviews)	A
The Good Dinosaur	76% (219 reviews)	66 (37 reviews)	A
Finding Dory	94% (340 reviews)	77 (48 reviews)	A
Cars 3	70% (233 reviews)	59 (41 reviews)	A
Coco	97% (357 reviews)	81 (48 reviews)	A+
Incredibles 2	93% (385 reviews)	80 (51 reviews)	A+
Toy Story 4	96% (461 reviews)	84 (57 reviews)	A
Onward	88% (347 reviews)	61 (56 reviews)	A−
Soul	95% (358 reviews)	83 (55 reviews)	—N/a
Luca	91% (308 reviews)	71 (52 reviews)	—N/a
Turning Red	95% (291 reviews)	83 (53 reviews)	—N/a
Lightyear	74% (321 reviews)	60 (57 reviews)	A−
Elemental	73% (267 reviews)	58 (45 reviews)	A
Inside Out 2	91% (329 reviews)	73 (59 reviews)	A
Elio	83% (229 reviews)	66 (40 reviews)	A
Hoppers	94% (235 reviews)	73 (46 reviews)	A
Toy Story 5	92% (331 reviews)	73 (55 reviews)	A

=== Academy Awards ===
Film	Best Picture	Animated Feature	Original Screenplay	Adapted Screenplay	Original Score	Original Song	Sound (Note: Starting with the 93rd Academy Awards, the Best Sound Mixing and Best Sound Editing categories were consolidated into a single Best Sound category.)		Other
Film	Best Picture	Animated Feature	Original Screenplay	Adapted Screenplay	Original Score	Original Song	Sound Editing	Sound Mixing	Other
Toy Story		Award not yet introduced	Nominated	Ineligible	Nominated	Nominated			Won Special Achievement
A Bug's Life		Award not yet introduced		Ineligible	Nominated				
Toy Story 2		Award not yet introduced	Ineligible			Nominated			
Monsters, Inc.		Nominated		Ineligible	Nominated	Won	Nominated		
Finding Nemo		Won	Nominated	Ineligible	Nominated		Nominated		
The Incredibles		Won	Nominated	Ineligible			Won	Nominated	
Cars		Nominated		Ineligible		Nominated			
Ratatouille		Won	Nominated	Ineligible	Nominated		Nominated	Nominated	
WALL-E		Won	Nominated	Ineligible	Nominated	Nominated	Nominated	Nominated	
Up	Nominated	Won	Nominated	Ineligible	Won		Nominated		
Toy Story 3	Nominated	Won	Ineligible	Nominated		Won	Nominated		
Cars 2			Ineligible						
Brave		Won		Ineligible					
Monsters University			Ineligible						
Inside Out		Won	Nominated	Ineligible					
The Good Dinosaur				Ineligible					
Finding Dory			Ineligible						
Cars 3			Ineligible						
Coco		Won		Ineligible		Won			
Incredibles 2		Nominated	Ineligible						
Toy Story 4		Won	Ineligible			Nominated			
Onward		Nominated		Ineligible					
Soul		Won		Ineligible	Won		Nominated	Nominated	
Luca		Nominated		Ineligible					
Turning Red		Nominated		Ineligible					
Lightyear			Ineligible						
Elemental		Nominated		Ineligible					
Inside Out 2		Nominated	Ineligible						
Elio		Nominated		Ineligible					

== See also ==
- List of 20th Century Studios theatrical animated feature films
- List of Blue Sky Studios productions
- List of Disney theatrical animated feature films
- List of Pixar shorts
- List of Pixar television series
- List of Walt Disney Animation Studios films
- List of computer-animated films
