= List of Pixar television series =

Pixar Animation Studios is an American computer animation film production company based in Emeryville, California, United States.

The following is a list of television series or specials that Pixar has released or plan on releasing. Some of the television productions were produced by Pixar, while others were produced by Disney Television Animation, but based on Pixar's films.

== Television series ==
=== Released ===
Title	Seasons	Episodes	Year(s)		Franchise	Network	Ref(s)
Title	Seasons	Episodes	Premiere date	End date	Franchise	Network	Ref(s)
Buzz Lightyear of Star Command	1	62	October 2, 2000	January 13, 2001	Toy Story	UPN / ABC	
Cars Toons	2	15	October 27, 2008	May 20, 2014	Cars	Toon Disney (season 1) / Disney Channel (season 1–2)	
Toy Story Toons	1	3	August 4, 2012	October 8, 2012	Toy Story	Disney Channel and Disney Jr.	
SparkShorts	1	11	January 18, 2019	February 2, 2024	N/A	YouTube (season 1) / Disney+ (season 1)	
Forky Asks a Question	1	10	November 12, 2019	January 10, 2020	Toy Story	Disney+	
Pixar In Real Life	1	11	November 12, 2019	September 4, 2020	Various	Disney+	
Inside Pixar	1	20	November 13, 2020	May 21, 2021	Various	Disney+	
Pixar Popcorn	1	11	January 22, 2021		Various	Disney+	
Monsters at Work	2	20	July 7, 2021	May 4, 2024	Monsters, Inc.	Disney+ (season 1) / Disney Channel (season 2)	
Dug Days	1	6	September 1, 2021	June 16, 2023	Up	Disney+	
Cars on the Road	1	9	September 8, 2022		Cars	Disney+	
Lego Pixar: BrickToons	1	5	September 4, 2024		Various	Disney+	
Dream Productions	1	4	December 11, 2024		Inside Out	Disney+	
Win or Lose	1	8	February 19, 2025	March 12, 2025	N/A	Disney+	
Ongoing
The Pixar Show	1	5	March 13, 2026	present	Various	YouTube	
PixARCADE	1	1	July 2, 2026	present	Various	YouTube	

=== Upcoming ===
Title	Seasons	Episodes	Year(s)	Franchise	Network	Ref(s)
Title	Seasons	Episodes	Premiere date	Franchise	Network	Ref(s)
Cars: Lightning Racers	1	TBA	July 2027	Cars	Disney Jr.	

== Television specials ==
Title	Premiere date	Franchise	Network	Ref(s)
Toy Story of Terror!	October 16, 2013	Toy Story	ABC	
Toy Story That Time Forgot	December 2, 2014	Toy Story	ABC	

== Cancelled projects ==
=== A Tin Toy Christmas ===
A half-hour television special, serving as a sequel to the short Tin Toy (1988) was considered, but Pixar felt convinced they could produce a feature film instead. The project later became Toy Story (1995).

=== 1906 TV series ===
In 2005, Brad Bird was collaborating with Pixar, Disney, and Warner Bros. Entertainment on a live-action film and television series adaptation of James Dalessandro's novel 1906. In 2010, Disney and Pixar left the project due to script problems and an estimated budget of $200 million.

=== Cars Toons: Tales from Radiator Springs: To Protect and Serve ===
At the 2013 Disney D23 Expo, it was announced that a fifth episode of the television series Cars Toons: Tales from Radiator Springs, entitled To Protect and Serve, was in production.

=== Toy Story Toons: Mythic Rock ===
In 2013, it was revealed a fourth short of Toy Story Toons was in the works, entitled Mythic Rock.

=== Untitled Win or Lose follow-up series ===
A follow-up television series of Win or Lose was in development, but it was quietly cancelled.

=== What's Your Toy Story? ===
In May 2022, an eight-episode competition series based on the Toy Story series titled What's Your Toy Story? was in development.

=== Ono Ghost Market ===
In March 2026, Pixar reported a new original film titled Ono Ghost Market was originally developed as a streaming television series for Disney+ before being reworked into a theatrical feature film. In August 2026, the film was retitled Ghost Market.

== See also ==
- List of Pixar films
- List of Pixar shorts
- List of Disney Television Animation productions
- List of Disney television series
- DreamWorks Animation Television
