= 1906 (disambiguation) =

1906 is a year on the Gregorian calendar.

1906 may also refer to:

- 1906 (novel), a 2004 novel by James Dalessandro based on his 1998 screenplay about the 1906 San Francisco earthquake
- 1906 (film), a film to be directed by Brad Bird, based on the 1998 screenplay by James Dalessandro
- 1906 (album), a 2000 album by Bambata
