= 1906 film =

1906 film may refer to:

- 1906 in film
- 1906 (film), an unreleased film about the 1906 San Francisco earthquake
