= San Francisco City Guides =

Tour provider in San Francisco

- Established: 1978
- Founder: Gladys Hansen
- Type: Nonprofit
- Affiliations: San Francisco Public Library
- Staff: 3
- Volunteers: 300
- Website: Official website

San Francisco City Guides (SFCG) is a nonprofit organization that offers dozens of different walking tours of San Francisco presented by trained, volunteer guides. Topics range from history and architecture to local legends throughout the city, some of which are seasonal, with May and October being the busiest months for tours. Tours are free but $20 donations are suggested when reserving online and again at the end of tours. Those donations provide around 80% of the organization's finances. Tours are rain or shine, tend to be less than a mile long and last 1.5 - 2 hours.

== History ==
=== Beginnings ===
San Francisco City Guides was founded after frequent requests for a tour of City Hall that were initially given by librarian Gladys Hansen starting in 1976. The tours were in such demand that Hansen trained a few volunteers to give tours of City Hall and the San Francisco Civic Center. In 1978, San Francisco City guides was formed in partnership with San Francisco Public Library.

=== 2000s ===
In 2004, City Guides collaborated with San Francisco Beautiful and Wilderness Press to celebrate the 20th anniversary of a book written by a City Guide, Adah Bakalinsky, Stairway Walks in San Francisco by offerings six different tours in different neighborhoods chosen by the author to highlight the best of San Francisco’s 400+ stairways.

As of 2010, there were around 250 trained guides giving around 60 different tours.

In 2011, National Geographic recommended SF City Guides as one of the best providers of free architecture tours in the United States.

As of 2023, there were around 300 volunteer guides giving around 70 unique tours.

The organization's 2024 Form 990 reported 3 employees and revenue of $485,000.

== Guides ==
Guides often wear red jackets and carry clipboards. Guides have to pay a few hundred dollars for a five month training and commit to giving at least ten tours a year. According to a 2021 survey, 60% of guides are retired. City Guide volunteers have various backgrounds such as professors, historians and retired executive directors. Audrey Cooper, the former Editor for the San Francisco Chronicle was a guide as was journalist Therese Poletti.

== See also ==
- Boston By Foot
- Chicago Architecture Center Tours
- San Francisco Historical Society
- San Francisco Tour Guide Guild
