= Museum of San Francisco =

Museum about the history of San Francisco, CA

Coordinates: 37.7943°N 122.4036°W

The Museum of San Francisco is a non-profit history museum focused on the history of the city of San Francisco located in the San Francisco Financial District.

== History ==
The Museum of San Francisco opened in 2019 and is operated by the San Francisco Historical Society. It is housed in the first building of the San Francisco mint, previously home to the Pacific Heritage Museum.

The street on which it is housed was renamed after Emperor Norton in 2023.

There has been previous attempts to create a history museum for the city. The Museum of the City of San Francisco operated from 1992 to 2000 and merged with the San Francisco Historical Society to renovate and open a museum in the Old San Francisco Mint, a project that was canceled in 2015.

== Collections and programs ==
The museum is home to a permanent exhibit and temporary community exhibits, as well as a learning center for children. It has received historical artifacts from Anchor Brewing upon its closure in 2023.
