= San Francisco Historical Society =

American nonprofit organization

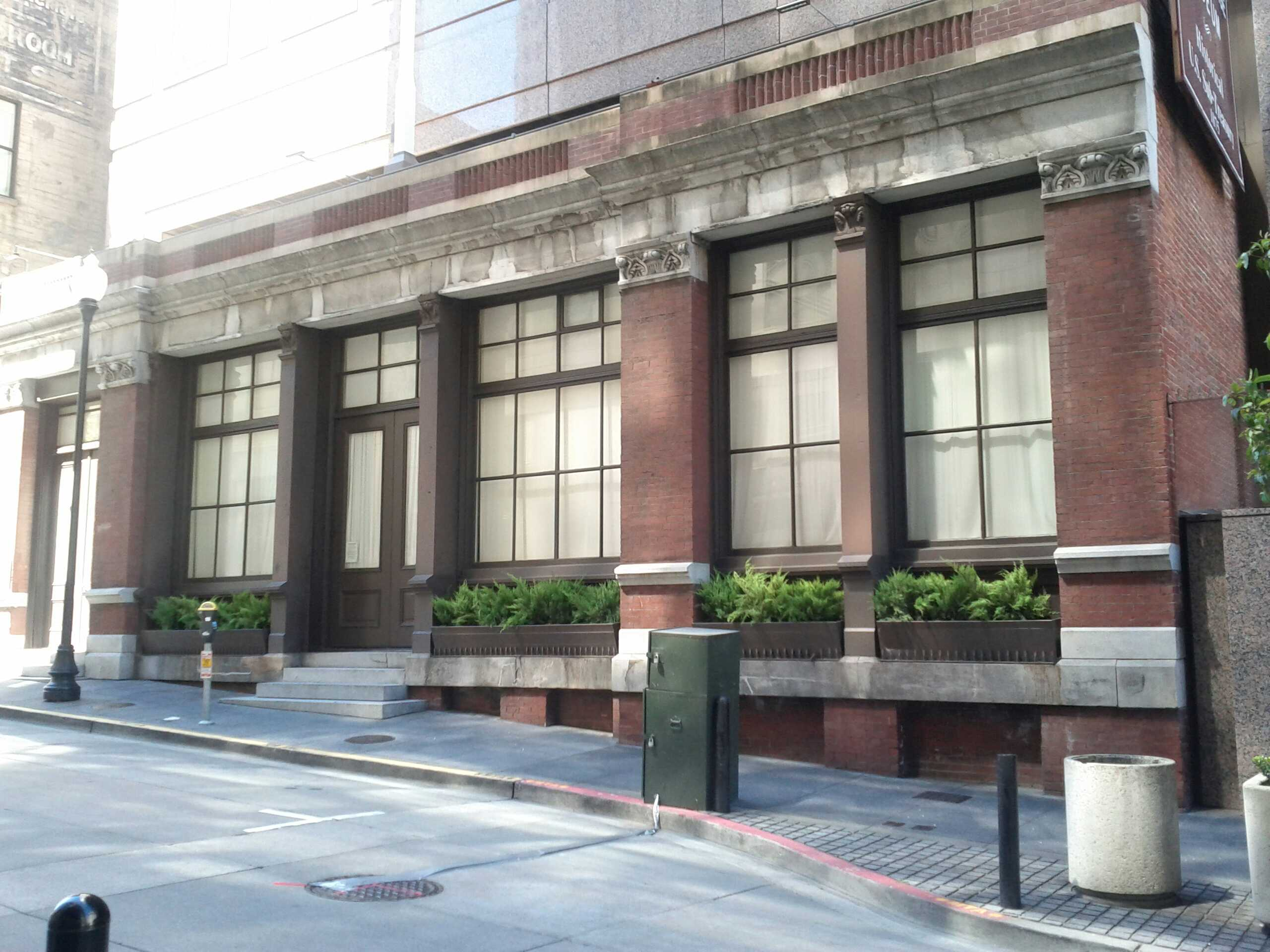
- 608 Commercial St (2012)

General information
- Location: 608 Commercial St
- Current tenants: San Francisco Historical Society
- Completed: 1854
- Renovated: 1906

Design and construction
- Designations: California Historical Landmark San Francisco Landmark

The San Francisco Historical Society is a nonprofit organization dedicated to the preservation, interpretation, and presentation of the history of San Francisco and the surrounding Bay Area. It is a membership-based organization that holds monthly speaking programs, conducts walking tours of San Francisco, provides educational resources for grade schools and publishes original research. The Barbary Coast Trail walking tour is a project of the society as is the journal Argonaut.

== History ==
The San Francisco Historical Society was founded in 1988 by historian Charles A. Fracchia.

In February 2002, the San Francisco Historical Society merged with the Museum of the City of San Francisco to create the San Francisco Museum and Historical Society, which the San Francisco municipal government recognized in 2002 as the official historical museum of San Francisco. One of the purposes of the merger of the two organizations was to put together a single proposal to renovate and operate the Old San Francisco Mint as a history museum.

The San Francisco Museum and Historical Society took over management of the Old Mint in 2004, with plans to make it the museum's permanent home. The organization spent about US$14 million to stabilize and partially renovate the building. However, the building still needed about US$60 million in additional work, and the City of San Francisco concluded the organization was not making progress quickly enough after 11 years of work, so it ordered SFMHS to vacate the building in 2015.

In 2019, the San Francisco Historical Society returned to its original name. In October of that year, the society moved into its first museum space, at 608 Commercial Street, in San Francisco. The site was also the first mint in San Francisco (from 1854-1876), with some of the original walls and subterranean vaults still standing.

In 2023, Anchor Brewing Company donated some historical artifacts to the Historical Society and the Smithsonian.

== See also ==
- Museum of the City of San Francisco
- San Francisco City Guides
- Museum of San Francisco
