= Elio (film) =

2025 film by Madeline Sharafian, Domee Shi, and Adrian Molina

- Theatrical release poster
- Directed by: Madeline Sharafian; Domee Shi; Adrian Molina (Note: Molina left the project by 2024 due to creative differences, but still retains director credit.)
- Screenplay by: Julia Cho; Mark Hammer; Mike Jones
- Story by: Adrian Molina; Madeline Sharafian; Domee Shi; Julia Cho
- Produced by: Mary Alice Drumm
- Starring: Yonas Kibreab; Zoe Saldaña; Remy Edgerly; Brandon Moon; Brad Garrett; Jameela Jamil
- Cinematography: Derek Williams; Jordan Rempel
- Edited by: Anna Wolitzky; Steve Bloom
- Music by: Rob Simonsen
- Production company: Pixar Animation Studios
- Distributed by: Walt Disney Studios; Motion Pictures (Note: Distributed under the Walt Disney Pictures banner.)
- Release dates: June 10, 2025 (El Capitan Theatre); June 20, 2025 (United States)
- Running time: 98 minutes
- Country: United States
- Language: English
- Budget: $150–200+ million (Note: While the original reported budget is $150 million, reports from former Pixar employees to The Hollywood Reporter state that the production cost was "well north of $200 million".)
- Box office: $154 million

Elio is a 2025 American animated science fiction adventure film directed by Madeline Sharafian, Domee Shi, and Adrian Molina, and written by Julia Cho, Mark Hammer, and Mike Jones. Produced by Pixar Animation Studios for Walt Disney Pictures, the film stars the voices of Yonas Kibreab, Zoe Saldaña, Remy Edgerly, Brandon Moon, Brad Garrett, and Jameela Jamil. It follows 11-year-old Elio (Kibreab) who is mistaken for the intergalactic ambassador of Earth after being beamed up to the Communiverse by aliens for making contact, and must navigate a crisis that involves the warlord Grigon (Garrett), who is the father of the alien child Glordon (Edgerly) who Elio befriends.

Elio was conceived by Molina as a story about childhood and social isolation and was inspired by growing up on a military base and his eventual enrollment at the California Institute of the Arts. The film was officially announced in September 2022, with Molina attached to direct. Molina later left the project due to creative differences and moved to work on Coco 2 (2029). In August 2024, it was announced that Shi and Sharafian would replace him as lead directors. The production team devised a process, titled the "College Project", to create the look of the space setting, the Communiverse. The film was produced with a virtual anamorphic lens and Pixar's new Luna lighting toolset was used to quickly define lighting and the overall aesthetic. Its musical score was composed by Rob Simonsen.

Elio premiered at the El Capitan Theatre in Hollywood, Los Angeles, on June 10, 2025, and was released in the United States on June 20. The film received generally positive reviews from critics but underperformed at the box office, grossing $154 million worldwide against an estimated budget of $150–200+ million. The film has been nominated for Best Animated Feature at the Critics' Choice Movie Awards, Golden Globe Awards, BAFTA Awards, and the Academy Awards, as well as a leading 10 nominations at the 53rd Annie Awards including Best Feature.

== Plot ==
After the death of his parents, young Elio Solís lives with his aunt Olga, an Air Force major who gave up her dreams of becoming an astronaut to raise her nephew. On an outing to a museum, Elio wanders into a closed exhibit on the Voyager 1 spacecraft, where he is awed by the idea of discovering other life in space.

Years later, Elio wishes to be abducted by aliens. Every day, he lies on the beach waiting, but without result. One night, a kid named Bryce and his bully friend Caleb tamper with Elio's ham radio, leading to a fight that injures his left eye. At Olga's workplace, Elio sneaks into an emergency meeting where conspiracy theorist Gunther Melmac claims to have detected an alien response to Voyager, but is dismissed by Olga and her colleagues. Elio uses Melmac's device to send a message, causing a power outage at the military base, nearly costing Olga her job. Olga decides to send him to a youth camp, which he dreads, as Bryce and Caleb are also there.

At camp, Elio escapes from Bryce, Caleb, and other bullies as they attempt to scare him. Back at the military base, Olga receives strange extraterrestrial messages in response to Elio, who is then abducted by an alien ship. Inside the spaceship, Ooooo, a liquid supercomputer, welcomes him to the Communiverse, a place where aliens from different worlds share their knowledge. Other ambassadors mistakenly declare him a candidate for ambassador, thinking he is the leader of Earth and that he created the Voyager spacecraft. Before Elio can clarify, Lord Grigon, a warlord previously rejected by the Communiverse, arrives to take the Communiverse by force. The ambassadors plan to return Elio to Earth while they resolve the crisis, but Elio volunteers to negotiate with Grigon in return for induction as an ambassador. Ooooo creates a clone of Elio to take his place back on Earth. Olga brings Other Elio home from camp after hearing about the fight.

Meanwhile, Elio attempts to negotiate with Grigon, but is imprisoned after unintentionally angering him. While trying to escape, he encounters Grigon's son, Glordon, and decides to use him as a bargaining chip to convince Grigon to leave the Communiverse alone. They head back to the Communiverse, where Elio gives Glordon a disc that regulates his body temperature. Grigon agrees to leave them in peace in exchange for Glordon's safe return.

Elio and Glordon confide in each other; Elio is lonely and feels misunderstood by his aunt, while Glordon resists becoming a war machine like his father. Elio devises a plan to keep them together; he hides the real Glordon in an escape shuttle while giving a clone to Grigon, but Grigon quickly realizes the deception. He compels the mind-reading Ambassador Questa to extract Glordon's location from Elio and sends troops to retrieve his son. Questa, realizing Elio is a regular kid, returns him to Earth. Meanwhile, Glordon accidentally activates the shuttle, heading toward Earth.

Back home, Elio is devastated but soon spots his aunt on the beach looking for him with Other Elio, whom she had already suspected was not her real nephew. After reconciling, they head to the military base, where Glordon's shuttle has been captured. Other Elio sacrifices himself to distract the military, while Elio and Olga sneak into the base to rescue Glordon, who is now suffering from hypothermia after his disc broke upon landing. They pilot the shuttle back to the Communiverse, calling Bryce, Melmac, and worldwide ham radio enthusiasts for help traveling through a debris field.

Reaching the Communiverse, they return Glordon to Grigon, who rips his warsuit open to swaddle him, saving his life, and apologizes to his son and the ambassadors. Elio is welcomed back into the Communiverse, but declines the offer, deciding that Earth is his home, and bids his friends farewell before returning to Earth with Olga.

== Voice cast ==
- Yonas Kibreab as Elio Solís, an eleven-year-old boy who is mistakenly identified by the aliens as Earth's ambassador
  - Kibreab also voices Other Elio, a clone of Elio. Kibreab suggested recording both versions of the character simultaneously "without a break".
- Zoe Saldaña as Olga Solís, Elio's aunt who is an Air Force major. She was originally written as Elio's mother and set to be voiced by America Ferrera. However, because the directors wanted to "deepen Elio's motivation for wanting to be abducted by aliens", the character was rewritten, with Ferrera leaving the project due to scheduling conflicts in August 2024. Sharafian stated that "it felt like a relationship with a mother and son was a bit too much."
- Remy Edgerly as Glordon, a worm-like alien whom Elio befriends. His design was influenced by studies of larval insects and microbiotic creatures, including the tardigrade. Animation supervisor Jude Brownbill described Glordon as "sort of mysterious, creepy, off-putting, a work with a bunch of teeth".
  - Edgerly also voices Other Glordon, a clone of Glordon.
- Brandon Moon as Helix, an alien ambassador from the planet Falluvinum
- Brad Garrett as Lord Grigon, a bulky, worm-like alien warlord and ambassador in high-tech armor from the planet Hylurg who is Glordon's father
- Jameela Jamil as Questa, a radiodonta-like alien ambassador from the planet Gom
- Dylan Gilmer as Bryce, a boy who shares the same fascination in aliens as Elio
- Jake Getman as Caleb, Bryce's friend who bullies Elio
- Matthias Schweighöfer as Tegmen, an alien ambassador from the planet Tegmen. Schweighöfer also voiced Tegmen in the film's German dub.
- Ana de la Reguera as Turais, an alien ambassador from the planet Com'acon
- Atsuko Okatsuka as Naos, an alien ambassador from an unknown planet who mastered the translations of the other alien races
- Shirley Henderson as Ooooo, a blue gelatinous liquid supercomputer. Described as "a Swiss Army knife made of droplets", animation supervisor Travis Hathaway stated that "she can become a screen, she can become a vinyl player, she can become a projector, she can manifest as a pen for Elio to write with".
- Brendan Hunt as Gunther Melmac, an Air Force analyst who is a conspiracy theorist. Melmac is the fictive home planet of ALF.
- Naomi Watanabe as Auva, an alien ambassador from the planet Knack a' Knack. Watanabe also voiced Auva in the film's Japanese dub.
- Anissa Borrego as Mira, an alien ambassador from the planet Drump
- Shelby Young as the Diplo Ship
- Bob Peterson as the Universal Users Manual
- Kate Mulgrew as the narrator of the Voyager 1 Museum Exhibit; Mulgrew previously portrayed Kathryn Janeway, captain of the fictional future starship USS Voyager, in the Star Trek franchise.
- Tamara Tunie as Colonel Markwell

Archival recordings of Carl Sagan are also used.

== Production ==
=== Development ===
In September 2022, during the D23 Expo, Pixar Animation Studios announced a new original film titled Elio, with Adrian Molina set to direct and Mary Alice Drumm set to produce. It would have marked Molina's feature-length solo directorial debut after having co-directed and co-written Coco (2017). Molina and Drumm talked about the film and posed the question, "What if I told you we're not alone in the universe, and everything you've ever heard about aliens is true?" Shortly after the announcement, there was a planned screen glitch delivering a message with alien text saying, "Bring us to your leader."

The film was conceived by Molina as a "personal coming-of-age story about youthful alienation." Molina was inspired by his childhood growing up at a military base and eventual enrollment at the California Institute of the Arts when developing the film's story. Director Madeline Sharafian described his feelings on the private art school by saying "he felt like he'd found his people there, he'd found his world". After working on the project for a couple of years, Molina felt like he "ultimately wasn't the one to see it to the finish line," exiting the film in order to work on Coco 2.

In June 2024, Pixar's chief creative officer Pete Docter revealed that Turning Red (2022) director Domee Shi was working on the film. She was officially announced as the new director at the D23 fan event in August 2024, alongside Madeline Sharafian, who previously worked on storyboarding the film. The screenplay was written by Julia Cho, Mark Hammer, and Mike Jones; Cho previously co-wrote Turning Red, while Jones previously co-wrote Pixar's Soul and Luca. During production, when researching the topic of loneliness, the directors talked to psychologists, including Vivek Murthy, about children's loneliness and grief. Sharafian said that "everybody's feeling it, and as we were learning more about it as a crew, we started to realize, we're like, 'Wait a minute. I'm really lonely right now'."

In June 2025, multiple insiders who worked at Pixar spoke to The Hollywood Reporter about the film. They noted that characterizations of Elio as a "queer-coded character" were removed as the film moved through the production process, with a push by Pixar executives to make Elio "more masculine," removing examples of his love of fashion and environmentalism, including after Adrian Molina departed the film as director, replaced by Madeline Sharafian and Domee Shi. Some expressed disappointment at the first cut of the movie shared by Sharafian and Shi, with one employee stating that the changes "destroyed this beautiful work" while another described the final version of Elio as "much more generic" as compared to previous versions. Reports that some employees left after Molina departed were disputed by another Pixar source. One former artist told the publication that executives were "constantly sanding down" moments which alluded to Elio's queer sexuality, engaging in "obeying-in-advance behavior" and that changes to the film made it about "totally nothing," describing the film's production as "something of a cautionary tale" to them, wondering if the "rewrite was worth it." The same source claimed that America Ferrera, who left the film's cast after Molina's departure, was "upset that there was no longer Latinx representation in the leadership" of the film.

In a 2026 interview, Docter defended the removal of the LGBTQ storyline, including reported scenes where Elio imagined living with his male crush and had a pink bike, saying "We're making a movie, not hundreds of millions of dollars in therapy." He also asserted that Pixar had found that certain parents did not want entertainment to pressure them into having conversations they were not ready to have with their children, according to The Wall Street Journal. During the film's production, Docter called for changes to the film, with changes made by Sharafian and Shi, following the departure of Molina, when the animation was mostly complete. These changes led to backlash among Pixar staff members, while disappointing and discouraging others.

=== Casting ===
In September 2022, during the D23 Expo, America Ferrera and Yonas Kibreab were announced to have been cast in the leading voice roles of Olga Solis and her son Elio, respectively. When Kibreab originally auditioned for the role of Elio, he recorded his audition in his parents's closet and received an email a month later for a scratch role. While recording his lines, Kibreab stated that "it was Elio who really helped me. I just had to think of Elio's story. There were so many deep things for me." and added that he relates to the character's loneliness.

In June 2023, with the release of the first teaser trailer and poster, Jameela Jamil and Brad Garrett joined the film's voice cast. In August 2024, Docter stated that Ferrera had withdrawn due to scheduling conflicts; parts of her voice acting still remain in the first teaser trailer. As a result, the character of Olga was rewritten as Elio's aunt and Ferrera was replaced by Zoe Saldaña. In November 2024, with the release of the second teaser trailer and poster, Remy Edgerly and Shirley Henderson joined the film's voice cast as Glordon and Ooooo, respectively.

=== Animation, design and cinematography ===
Elio marks the final Pixar film from veteran production designer Harley Jessup, who collaborated with visual effects supervisor Claudia Chung Sanii to create the look of Communiverse. The goal was to create a version of space unlike any other put on screen, one made of translucent and luminescent qualities and loosely defined gravity to accommodate the different alien species. Jessup referred to the creative process the two conceived to settle the look as the "College Project". VR and macro photography in water tanks were used in the process, with one test shot recorded in a drinking glass at a Pixar studio party. Another shot saw oil and water being put in a glass bowl that rested on top of a sheet of sequins and glitter.

For the aliens, the team researched microscopic plants and animals to capture an odd but believable vibe. Glordon's design in particular was influenced by larval insects and microbiotic creatures like tardigrades. The biggest challenges with the character was finding a balance of cute and creepy, and making him expressive without eyes. Animation supervisor Jude Brownbill said that Glordon's contrasting design and personality was pivotal in making him work. OOOOO, a liquid, shapeshifting super computer, was a particular challenge for the technical artists due to her dynamic effects. Her fluidity was defined through 2D animation tests. Facial rigging and techniques learned from the series Win or Lose (2025) were leveraged.

Pixar's new Luna lighting toolset allowed for the Elio team to define lighting and camera at the same time and pinpoint the aesthetic early in production. In CG animation, lighting is traditionally the last step in the visuals, unlike with live-action where camera and lighting are done simultaneously. Sanii said of the technology: "We got that pre-alpha of a look at that, and that's when we discovered this universe could really work: all the luminance and the translucency that Harley was putting in there". The directors worked with cinematographers Derek Williams and Jordan Rempel to create a visual language inspired by classic Steven Spielberg science fiction films such as E.T. the Extra-Terrestrial (1982) and Close Encounters of the Third Kind (1977), as well as R-rated horrors from the same period like Ridley Scott's Alien (1979) and John Carpenter's The Thing (1982). This included the calculated use of dark shadows, in addition to mist and glow to bring about a dreamy atmosphere. The film was shot using a virtual anamorphic lens. Sharafian said of the decision that they used "real cameras the same way a live-action film would", adding that little touches, for example, "a red ring around a light" shining at the audience, may be observable.

== Music ==
In November 2024, Rob Simonsen was announced to compose the score for Elio. This marks the composer's first animated film. Simonsen was brought in to work on Elio about two and half years before the film's release. Pixar shared with him the story of the film, and Simonsen strongly resonated with it. Each major setting of Elio was given a unique musical identity. The soundtrack album was released by Walt Disney Records on June 20, 2025, the same day as the film's theatrical release.

== Release ==
=== Theatrical ===
Elio premiered at the El Capitan Theatre in Hollywood, Los Angeles, on June 10, 2025, and was theatrically released in the United States by Walt Disney Studios Motion Pictures under their Walt Disney Pictures banner on June 20, 2025. It was originally scheduled to be released on March 1, 2024, but on October 27, 2023, the film was delayed to June 13, 2025. Pete Docter said on August 9, 2024, that the film's delay was due in part to the 2023 SAG-AFTRA strike as well as the change in leadership on this film and other projects at Pixar. On February 14, 2025, Elio was delayed one week later to avoid competition with How to Train Your Dragon.

=== Marketing ===
Following the project announcement, the first look concept art of the film was released on September 9, 2022. Joshua Meyer of /Film said it "sounds like the kind of fresh, original storytelling that Pixar built its brand on." The first teaser trailer was released on June 13, 2023, featuring "Good Feeling" by Austin French. Ethan Anderton of /Film said "Adding some charm to this story is the fact that Elio isn't exactly the most confident kid. Though he's artistic and creative, he's also more of an indoor kid who doesn't fit in with his peers. But perhaps being among a group of aliens who aren't human will allow him an opportunity to make a connection without any societal pressure. This just might be the opportunity Elio needs to come out of his shell." Pauli Poisuo of Looper says while it "obviously doesn't give too much of the story away, it certainly looks gorgeous and intriguing."

The second teaser trailer, revealing new changes such as a new logo, was released on November 21, 2024, featuring "Such Great Heights" by the Postal Service. Julie and T.J. of Pixar Post said the film "drew visual comparisons to past Pixar films like Coco, WALL-E, and Finding Nemo with colorful characters, movement, and lighting." A longer trailer was released on March 19, 2025.

On June 16, 2025, a cross-promotional short was made in which the titular characters of Phineas and Ferb contact with Elio and Glordon and Candace attempts to bust them as they get abducted.

On June 30, Pixar released an online series of in-universe bloopers for the film. The studio had previously created bloopers for the end credits of A Bug's Life (1998), Toy Story 2 (1999), and Monsters, Inc. (2001).

=== Home media ===
Elio was released for digital purchase on August 19, 2025, and on Ultra HD Blu-ray, Blu-ray, and DVD on September 9, 2025. The film was released on Disney+ on September 17.

In the United States, Elio ranked No. 9 on the combined DVD and Blu-ray sales chart for September 2025, following its physical release, according to Circana's VideoScan tracking service. Analytics company Samba TV, which gathers viewership data from certain smart TVs and content providers, reported that the film attracted 368% more U.S. households on Disney+ in its first five days compared to its PVOD debut.

Disney+, which calculates its "Top 10" list by considering daily views for episodes and movies alongside the growing popularity of newly released titles, listed Elio as the most-streamed title on the platform in the United States following its release. In the United Kingdom, the film also debuted at No. 1 on Disney+. Streaming analytics firm FlixPatrol, which monitors daily updated VOD charts and streaming ratings across the globe, calculated that it ranked No. 1 on the streaming platform's Top 10 Movies in the World chart, holding the top position in 59 countries as of September 21. Nielsen Media Research, which records streaming viewership on certain U.S. television screens, announced that Elio was streamed for 550 million minutes from September 15–21, ranking as the third most-streamed film of the week. The following week, between September 22–28, it remained the third most-streamed film, with 350 million minutes of watch time. From September 29 to October 5, Elio garnered 215 million minutes of watch time, ranking as the eighth most-streamed film of the week.

== Reception ==
=== Box office ===
Elio has grossed $73 million in the United States and Canada, and $81 million in other territories, for a worldwide total of $154 million.

In the United States and Canada, Elio was released alongside 28 Years Later, and was initially projected to gross around $30 million from 3,750 theaters in its opening weekend. The film made $9 million on its first day, including $3 million from Wednesday and Thursday previews, lowering projections to $20–22 million. The film went on to debut to $20.8 million, finishing in third behind How to Train Your Dragon and 28 Years Later, becoming the lowest opening weekend for a Pixar film. Deadline Hollywood's Anthony D'Alessandro, Pamela McClintock of The Hollywood Reporter, and Variety's Rebecca Rubin attributed the low opening to competition from How to Train Your Dragon and Lilo & Stitch. D'Alessandro, McClintock, and Rubin also acknowledged the challenge for original Pixar films succeeding at the box office during the post-COVID-19 pandemic era. However, they noted the film could show staying power in later weeks, similar to Pixar's Elemental (2023). The film made $10.4 million in its second weekend (a drop of 50%), remaining in third. In its third weekend, Elio made $5.8 million (a drop of 44.5%), finishing fourth. After the film made a further $4 million in its fourth weekend, and crossing the $100 million mark worldwide after a month of release, Rubin stated for Variety that the film will end up "a major money loser for Disney and Pixar".

=== Critical response ===
On the review aggregator website Rotten Tomatoes, 83% of 229 critics' reviews are positive, with an average rating of 6.9/10. The website's consensus reads: "Catapulted by its theme of building self-esteem, Pixar's latest cosmic wonder Elio boasts a fanciful world of original creations to dazzling effect." Metacritic, which uses a weighted average, assigned the film a score of 66 out of 100, based on 40 critics, indicating "generally favorable" reviews. Audiences polled by CinemaScore gave the film an average grade of A on an A+ to F scale, while those surveyed by PostTrak gave it an 83% overall positive score, with 59% saying they would definitely recommend the film.

Ty Burr of The Washington Post gave the film three stars out of four, concluding: "The sugar highs of this rambunctious thrill ride are fun, in other words, but in the end Elio is most memorable when it eases up to celebrate the invisible ties of love and friendship that bind all of us aliens to each other." Peter Debruge of Variety wrote: "Elio is right at home in the Pixar catalog, but lacks those undeniable signs of intelligent life (wit, surprise, and the capacity to expand the medium) that set the studio's best work apart." Nevertheless, he felt the film was at its "most fun once it becomes a buddy movie" and praised the emotional beats. Carlos Aguilar of IGN summarized, "With incisive humor, radiant, eye-catching animation, and peculiar alien characters, there's enough entertainment value in Elio to satisfy viewers who are the protagonist's age or younger [...] even if it leaves you wishing some of its imaginative concepts and creations would have received more screen time." Kyle Smith of The Wall Street Journal explained that "Elio isn't a first-rate Pixar offering, but thanks to sumptuous animation and a warm spirit, it's a cute Wizard of Oz–style journey to the beyond and back. Outer space is cool, but there's no place like home." Laura Venning of Empire described the film as "Robert Zemeckis' Contact for kids. A slow start gives way to a charming, visually inventive adventure that might just inspire a new generation of astronomers to look to the skies."

Manohla Dargis of The New York Times called the film "a lackluster science-fiction adventure", writing "there's not much more to Elio once the kids become friends and this world's novelty wears off, giving way to banality. Feelings are shared, if largely for the viewers; minor family issues are raised (and resolved); clichés and contrivances pile up." Angie Han for The Hollywood Reporter similarly noted: "Elio is a perfectly nice kiddie sci-fi adventure that does everything a movie with that description is supposed to do. But much like Elio, I frequently found myself longing for the more transportive experience, of the sort that Pixar used to make a house specialty." Richard Lawson of Vanity Fair complimented the "lush and lively" animation, but felt the film "runs aground on all-too-familiar shores. Pixar has begun doing what it once seemed it never would: repeating itself."

=== Accolades ===
Award	Date of ceremony	Category	Recipient	Result	Ref.
Washington D.C. Area Film Critics Association	December 7, 2025	Best Animated Film	Elio	Nominated	
St. Louis Film Critics Association	December 14, 2025	Best Animated Film	Elio	Nominated	
New York Film Critics Online	December 15, 2025	Best Animation	Elio	Nominated	
San Diego Film Critics Society	December 15, 2025	Best Animated Film	Elio	Nominated	
Austin Film Critics Association	December 18, 2025	Best Animated Film	Elio	Nominated	
Georgia Film Critics Association	December 27, 2025	Best Animated Film	Elio	Nominated	
Critics' Choice Awards	January 4, 2026	Best Animated Feature	Elio	Nominated	
Golden Globes Awards	January 11, 2026	Best Motion Picture – Animated	Elio	Nominated	
London Film Critics Circle Awards	February 1, 2026	Animated Feature of the Year	Elio	Nominated	
Annie Awards	February 21, 2026	Best Feature	Elio	Nominated	
Annie Awards	February 21, 2026	Best FX – Feature	Ferdi Scheepers, Shaun Galinak, Alyssa Lee, Nate Skeen, and Gary Bruins	Nominated	
Annie Awards	February 21, 2026	Best Character Animation – Feature	Jonah Sidhom	Nominated	
Annie Awards	February 21, 2026	Best Character Design – Feature	Matt Nolte, Yingzong Xin, James Woods, Kaleb Rice, Bob Pauley	Nominated	
Annie Awards	February 21, 2026	Best Music – Feature	Rob Simonsen	Nominated	
Annie Awards	February 21, 2026	Best Production Design – Feature	Harley Jessup, Ernesto Nemesio, Maria Lee, Kristian Norelius, Kyle Jones	Nominated	
Annie Awards	February 21, 2026	Best Storyboarding – Feature	Tony Rosenast	Nominated	
Annie Awards	February 21, 2026	Best Voice Acting – Feature	Remy Edgerly	Nominated	
Annie Awards	February 21, 2026	Best Writing – Feature	Julia Cho, Mark Hammer, Mike Jones	Nominated	
Annie Awards	February 21, 2026	Best Editorial – Feature	Anna Wolitzky, Steve Bloom, Noah Newman, Greg Snyder, Ben Morris	Nominated	
Visual Effects Society Awards	February 25, 2026	Outstanding Animation in an Animated Feature	Claudia Chung Sanii, Mary Alice Drumm, Harley Jessup, Dave Quirus	Nominated	
Visual Effects Society Awards	February 25, 2026	Outstanding Character in an Animated Feature	Catherine Luo, Anna-Christine Lykkegaard, Ferdi Scheepers, Julian Teo (for "Ooooo the Liquid Supercomputer")	Nominated	
Visual Effects Society Awards	February 25, 2026	Outstanding Character in an Animated Feature	Marco Burbano, Edgar Rodriguez, Ben Rush, Patrick Yu Wang (for "Glordon")	Nominated	
Visual Effects Society Awards	February 25, 2026	Outstanding Environment in an Animated Feature	Steve Arguello, Christopher M. Burrows, Andy Lin, Laura Murphy (for "The Communiverse")	Nominated	
Visual Effects Society Awards	February 25, 2026	Emerging Technology Award	Andrew Butts, Trent Crow, Anna-Christine Lykkegaard, Catherine Luo (For "Real-Time High Fidelity Animation System Using Signed Distance Functions")	Nominated	
Art Directors Guild Awards	February 28, 2026	Best Animated Feature Film	Elio – Harley Jessup	Nominated	
Producers Guild Awards	February 28, 2026	Award for Outstanding Producer of Animated Theatrical Motion Pictures	Elio – Mary Alice Drumm	Nominated	
Motion Picture Sound Editors	March 8, 2026	Outstanding Achievement in Sound Editing – Feature Animation	Disney Pixar	Nominated	
Saturn Awards	March 8, 2026	Best Animated Film	Elio	Nominated	
Academy Awards	March 15, 2026	Best Animated Feature	Elio	Nominated	
Satellite Awards	March 10, 2026	Best Motion Picture – Animated or Mixed Media	Elio	Won	
