= James Dalessandro =

American writer and filmmaker

- Born: 1948 (age 77–78); Cleveland, Ohio, U.S.
- Education: Valley Forge High School; Ohio University; University of California, Los Angeles
- Occupations: Writer; filmmaker
- Spouse: Kathleen Callies (m. 1988)
- Writing career
- Genre: Historical fiction
- Notable work: 1906 (2004)

James Dalessandro (born 1948) is an American writer and filmmaker. He is best known for his historical-fiction novel 1906, based on events surrounding the Great San Francisco earthquake and fire of 1906.

A film adaptation of 1906, based on both the novel and Dalessandro's screenplay, has been in development at Warner Bros. and Pixar Animation Studios, in association with Walt Disney Pictures. Screenwriter and director Brad Bird has been developing a project based on the novel.

== Early life and education ==
James Dalessandro was born in Cleveland, Ohio, on September 3, 1948, and attended Valley Forge High School. He is of predominantly Italian descent, holds both U.S. and Italian/EU citizenship, and is proficient in both written and spoken Italian. He studied journalism at Ohio University in Athens, Ohio, and later studied screenwriting and filmmaking at UCLA.

== Career ==
For many years, Dalessandro worked as a writer in the trailer and marketing department at Columbia Pictures.

From 1973 to 1977, he was co-founder of the Santa Cruz Poetry Festival with Lawrence Ferlinghetti and served as its director for four years. At the time, it was the nation's largest annual literary festival and brought Charles Bukowski, William S. Burroughs, Allen Ginsberg, Ken Kesey, Michael McClure, Gary Snyder, and musicians such as Anthony Braxton and Charles Lloyd to the seaside town of Santa Cruz, California. The festival set attendance records—over 2,000 people per night—at the Civic Auditorium and ushered in what Ferlinghetti called "a new birth of American poetry," adding, "The credit belongs to James Dalessandro."

Dalessandro was also the writer of The House of Blues Radio Hour, hosted by Dan Aykroyd (as Elwood Blues), during the period in which it won the Platinum Award from the National Association of Broadcasters. He was also the writer and creator of "Rock On" with The Doors' keyboardist Ray Manzarek. Both projects were produced by Ben Manilla Productions of San Francisco, California.

He is a lifetime member of the Writers Guild of America (WGA) and has sold or been hired for more than 30 feature film and television projects for Motown Films, CBS, Court TV, Warner Bros. Television, Warner Bros. Pictures, FX, David Wolper Productions, Stan Lee's POW! Entertainment, Televisa USA, Gross/Jacobson Productions, Barry Levinson, and others.

Dalessandro has published four books: Canary In A Coal Mine (poetry), Bohemian Heart, a work of detective fiction published in 1993, Citizen Jane (true crime), and 1906 (historical fiction).

In 1997, his 38-page outline and six finished chapters for a new novel, "1906", a re-telling of the Great San Francisco Earthquake and fire, became the subject of a Hollywood bidding war. The rights went to Warner Brothers Films and their newly signed director Barry Levinson.

Dalessandro's documentary on the 1906 earthquake, The Damnedest, Finest Ruins, won numerous film-festival awards and was broadcast on San Francisco's KQED/PBS station. In January 2005, San Francisco's Board of Supervisors voted unanimously on Dalessandro's resolution to set aside the official death count of 478, which had stood since shortly after the disaster, and to recognize the figure of "3,000 plus," based on four decades of research by San Francisco Historian Emeritus Gladys Hansen.

In September 2009, Hallmark Channel broadcast the movie Citizen Jane, the story of Jane Alexander, a Marin County, California woman who had spent 13 years tracking down and helping to convict the man who murdered her 88-year-old aunt. Dalessandro wrote the teleplay and served as one of the movie's producers. He also wrote the pilot for a series based on Citizen Jane, which is under active development with producer Larry Jacobson and Entertainment One. He is the writer, director and producer of the documentary film, The Damnedest, Finest Ruins, narrated by actor Peter Coyote, which looked at the San Francisco earthquake and fire. Robert Ericksson of the History Channel called the documentary "astonishing."

The January 2010 issue of Playboy ran his article Petrosino v. The Black Hand, the story of Joseph Petrosino, a New York shoeshine boy who was drafted into the NYPD to combat crime in Little Italy, launching his 26-year battle with the American Mafia. As of 2014, he was the writer and Executive Producer of an FX Channel, 10-Hour limited series based on the life of Det. Joseph Petrosino with his writing/producing partner, Bobby Moresco, Oscar winner for Crash and Million Dollar Baby.

Dalessandro has lectured at the Cinequest Film Festival, the Women's International Fiction Writing Conference in Matera, Italy (in both English and Italian) and Screenwriting Expo in Los Angeles, CA. He formerly taught "Screenwriting as a Pro" at Fort Mason Art Center and 17 years as an adjunct professor in Advanced Film and Advanced Television Writing at the Academy of Art University - both in San Francisco.

Dalessandro is currently executive producer and co-writer of Stan Lee's "RESTLESS" television series with David Greenwalt. He is also the creator of Way Cool World, a 3D animated series whose first episode entered production in 2025.

In 2025, Dalessandro worked with the digital storyboarding platform StoryBoom on educational materials and narrative-planning tools.

== Personal life ==
James Dalessandro is married to the former Kathleen "Katie" Callies (since 1988) and has a son.
