= Museum of the City of San Francisco =

Permanently closed museum about the history of San Francisco, CA

The Museum of the City of San Francisco was a nonprofit museum containing a collection of historic artifacts related to San Francisco.

== History ==
The Museum of the City of San Francisco was founded in 1991 by Gladys Hansen, who had recently retired as the city archivist of San Francisco. It was recognized as the official historical museum of San Francisco by the Board of Supervisors in 1995. The museum had a small exhibit space at The Cannery (a former Del Monte fruit-canning plant that is now a shopping center) until 2000, when it lost its lease. It then had temporary exhibits at Pier 45 and San Francisco City Hall. Hansen also published a website under the same name from 1988 on.

In February 2002, the Museum of the City of San Francisco merged with the San Francisco Historical Society to create the San Francisco Museum and Historical Society. One of the purposes of the merger of the two organizations was to put together a single proposal to renovate and operate the Old San Francisco Mint as a history museum, a project that was canceled in 2015 due to renovation costs outpacing fundraising efforts.

In 2013, Hansen started partnering with the Bethlehem Shipyard Museum on exhibits, and displayed her collection at a location near Union Square. The non-profit ceased operating in 2018.

== See also ==
- San Francisco Historical Society
- Museum of San Francisco
