= Adrian Molina =

American animator and filmmaker

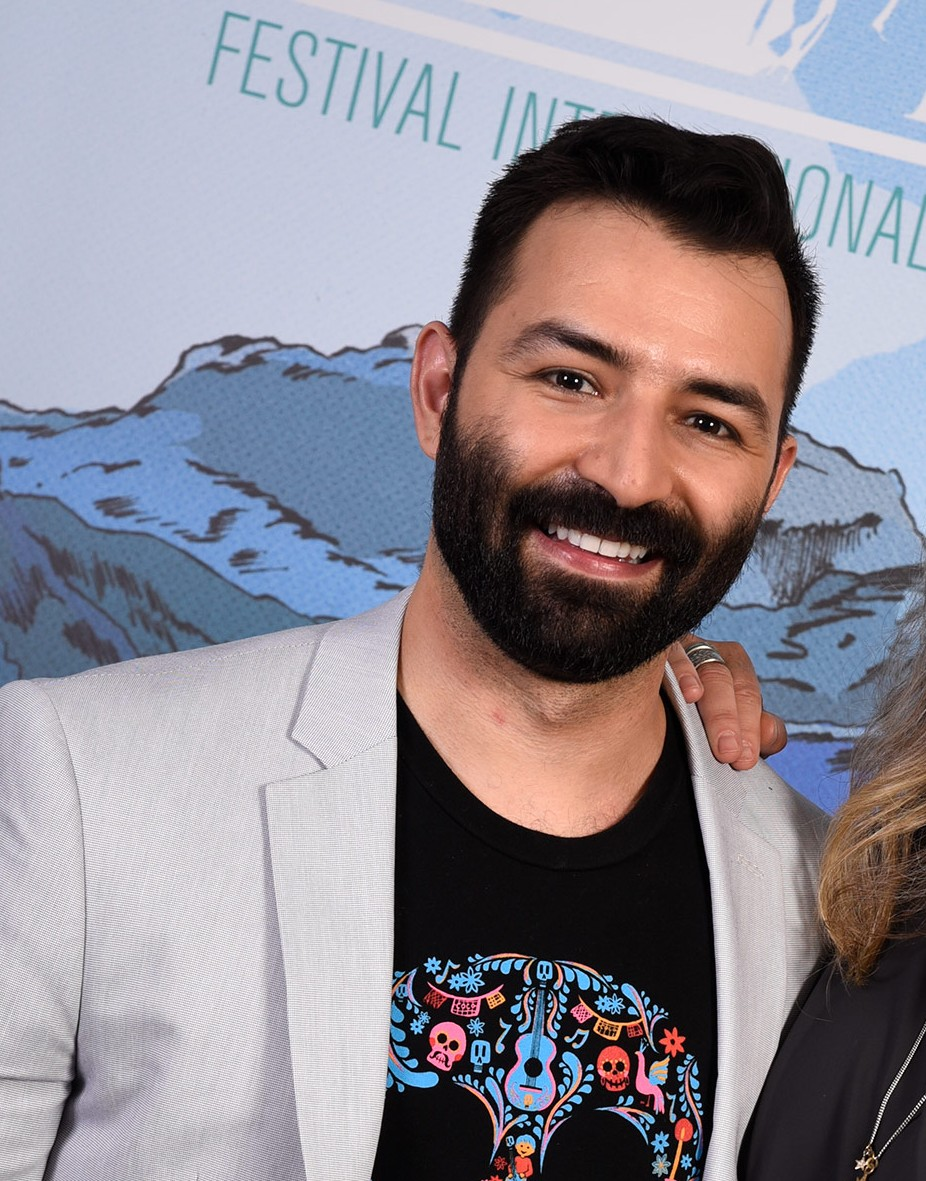
- Molina at the 2017 Annecy International Animated Film Festival
- Born: Yuba City, California, U.S.
- Education: California Institute of the Arts (BFA)
- Occupations: Screenwriter; director; storyboard artist; animator
- Years active: 2006–present
- Employer: Pixar Animation Studios (2007–present)
- Spouse: Ryan Dooley (m. 2011)

Adrian Molina is an American animator, storyboard artist, screenwriter and director. He is best known for his works at Pixar, including co-writing and co-directing Coco (2017) and Elio (2025). For the latter, he received a nomination for the Academy Award for Best Animated Feature and a win for the Satellite Award for Best Animated or Mixed Media Feature.

== Early life and education ==
Molina was born in Yuba City, California to a Mexican family, and raised in Grass Valley. He graduated from Bear River High School in 2003, to subsequently attend and graduate from the California Institute of the Arts in 2007.

== Career ==
Molina joined Pixar in 2007. He started as a 2D animator on Ratatouille. He later moved on to be a storyboard artist, working on Toy Story 3 and Monsters University. Molina also illustrated the Little Golden Book for Toy Story 3. After getting an additional screenplay material credit for both Monsters University and The Good Dinosaur, Molina started his first assignment as a screenwriter, for Coco, and later went on to co-direct the film. He also wrote several lyrics for the film.

In 2022, he served as an associate executive producer on the Academy Award-nominated Turning Red.

Following the success of Coco and the D23 Expo announcement in September 2022, Molina was announced to direct the 2025 film Elio. However in August 2024, it was announced that Molina had left the project, with Madeline Sharafian and Domee Shi taking over the storywriting and directorial duties instead. Nevertheless, he retained his director credit on the film due to his heavy amount of work that he made. Reports in June 2025 suggested Molina left after studio demands for edits to remove the LGBTQ storyline from the film, with staff members crying when they learned of his departure. It was later reported that following his departure from the film, the storyline was dramatically changed under the direction of Sharafian and Shi, removing reported scenes where Elio imagined living with his male crush and had a pink bike, leading to backlash among Pixar staff members while disappointing and discouraging others. In March 2026, Pixar chief executive director Pete Docter defended the changes, saying "We're making a movie, not hundreds of millions of dollars in therapy" and asserted that Pixar had found that certain parents did not want entertainment to pressure them into having conversations they were not ready to have with their children, according to the Wall Street Journal.

In March 2025, during the Disney Shareholder Meeting, CEO Bob Iger announced that the sequel to Coco was in early development, with Molina returning from the original film.

== Personal life ==
Molina is gay. He has been married to Ryan Dooley since 2011.

== Filmography ==
=== Feature films ===
| Year | Title | Director | Writer | Executive Producer | Story Artist | Other | Notes |
|---|---|---|---|---|---|---|---|
| 2007 | Ratatouille | No | No | No | No | Yes | Animator: End Titles |
| 2010 | Toy Story 3 | No | No | No | Yes | No | |
| 2013 | Monsters University | No | No | No | Yes | Yes | Additional Screenplay Material; Opening Title Designer and Director |
| 2015 | The Good Dinosaur | No | No | No | No | Yes | Additional Screenplay Material |
| 2017 | Coco | Co-Director | Yes | No | No | Yes | Additional Voices, Songwriter |
| 2021 | Luca | No | No | No | No | Yes | Additional Story Contributions |
| 2022 | Turning Red | No | No | Associate | No | No | |
| 2025 | Elio | Yes | Story | No | No | No | |
| 2029 | Coco 2 | Co-Director | TBA | No | No | No | |

Pixar Senior Creative Team

- Toy Story 4 (2019)
- Onward (2020)
- Soul (2020)
- Luca (2021)
- Turning Red (2022)
- Lightyear (2022)
- Elemental (2023)
- Inside Out 2 (2024)
- Elio (2025)
- Hoppers (2026)
- Toy Story 5 (2026)

=== Short films ===
| Year | Title | Notes |
|---|---|---|
| 2006 | CuddleBee Hugs 'n' Such | Short film from CalArts, co-directed with Alex Hirsch |

== Accolades ==
Accolades received by Adrian Molina
| Award | Date of ceremony | Category | Film | Result | Ref. |
|---|---|---|---|---|---|
| Annie Awards | February 3, 2018 | Directing in an Animated Feature Production | Coco | Won | |
| Annie Awards | February 3, 2018 | Music in an Animated Feature Production | Coco | Won | |
| Annie Awards | February 3, 2018 | Writing in an Animated Feature Production | Coco | Won | |
| Humanitas Prize | February 16, 2018 | Feature – Family | Coco | Nominated | |
| Imagen Awards | August 25, 2018 | Best Director | Coco | Won | |
| Academy Awards | March 15, 2026 | Best Animated Feature | Elio | Nominated | |
