= Coco (franchise) =

Pixar media franchise

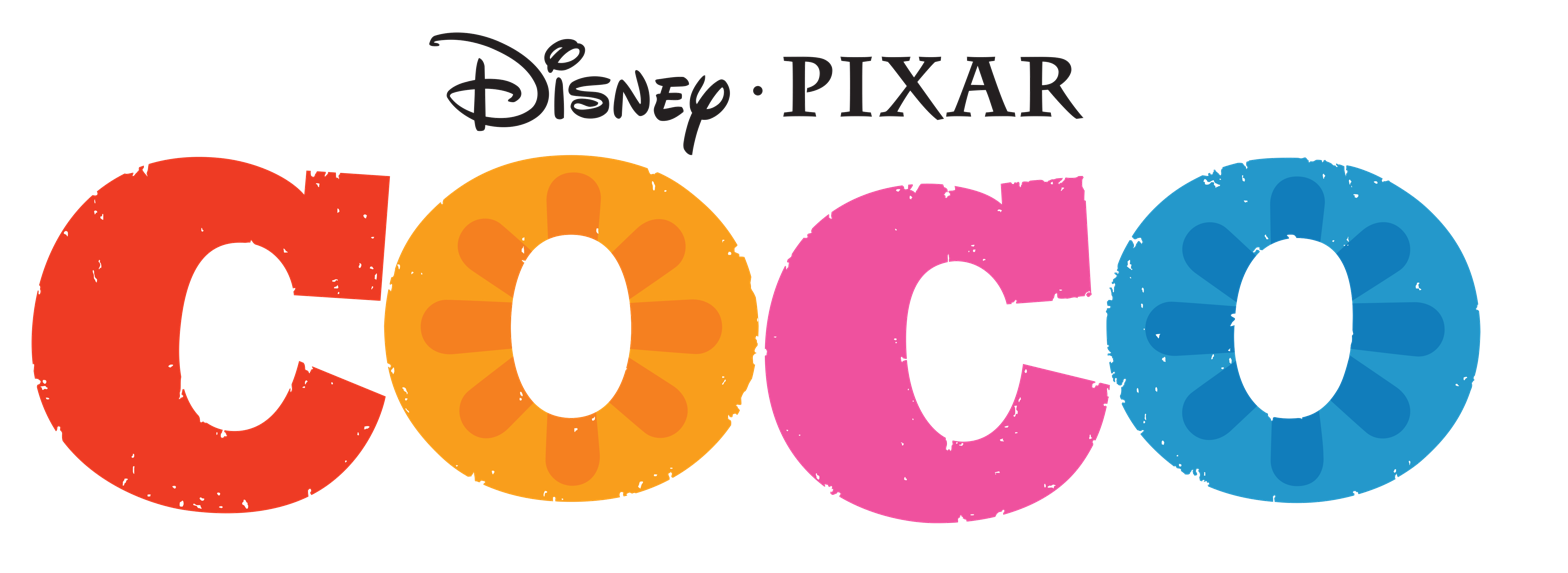
- Created by: Lee Unkrich; Jason Katz; Matthew Aldrich; Adrian Molina
- Developed by: Adrian Molina Matthew Aldrich
- Original work: Coco (2017)
- Owner: Pixar Animation Studios (The Walt Disney Company)
- Years: 2017–present

Films and television
- Films: Coco (2017); Coco 2 (2029)
- Short films: Dante's Lunch (2017); A Day in the Life of the Dead (2021); Family Bands Together (2024)

Games
- Video games: Disney Emoji Blitz (2016)^{*}; Disney Magic Kingdoms (2016)^{*}; Lego The Incredibles (2018)^{*}; Disney Heroes: Battle Mode (2018)^{*}

Audio
- Soundtrack: Coco (2017)
- ^{*} Work where this franchise's characters or settings appeared as part of a crossover.

Coco is an American media franchise created by Lee Unkrich, Jason Katz, Matthew Aldrich and Adrian Molina, produced by Pixar Animation Studios and distributed by its parent company Walt Disney Studios Motion Pictures. The series takes place in Mexico around the holiday Dia de Muertos and follows Miguel Rivera and his family, the former of whom discovers a link between the living and the dead. It began with the 2017 film of the same name, and will be followed by Coco 2 (2029). The franchise also includes three short films, several video games, and a future theme park ride.

== Films ==
Film	U.S. release date	Directed by	Screenplay by	Story by	Produced by
Coco	November 22, 2017	Lee Unkrich	Adrian Molina & Matthew Aldrich	Lee Unkrich & Jason Katz & Matthew Aldrich & Adrian Molina	Darla K. Anderson
Coco 2	November 21, 2029	Lee Unkrich	TBA	TBA	Mark Nielsen

=== Coco (2017) ===
The story follows a 12-year-old boy in Mexico named Miguel (Gonzalez) who is accidentally transported to the Land of the Dead, where he seeks the help of his deceased musician great-great-grandfather to return him to his family and reverse their ban on music.

=== Coco 2 (2029) ===
In March 2025, Disney CEO Bob Iger announced that a sequel, titled Coco 2 is in development. Lee Unkrich and Adrian Molina will return as director and co-director, respectively, while Mark Nielsen will serve as producer. The announcement gave a release window of 2029, which was subsequently removed. Pixar's chief creative officer Pete Docter revealed that Incredibles 3 and Coco 2 were set to be released in "2028 and beyond". On August 14, 2026, it was announced during the D23 Fan Event that the film would be released on November 21, 2029, and that Benjamin Bratt would reprise his role as Ernesto de la Cruz.

== Short films ==
=== Dante's Lunch (2017) ===
A two-minute short film, titled Dante's Lunch – A Short Tail, was released online on March 29, 2017. It introduces the film's supporting character, a Xoloitzcuintle named Dante. The short was created early in the animation process by Unkrich and his team to have a better sense of the character.

The short follows Dante trying to catch a mysterious moving bone.

=== A Day in the Life of the Dead (2021) ===
This short is from the Pixar Popcorn series; it is about an average day in the afterlife.

=== Family Bands Together (2024) ===
Included as the fifth and final episode of Lego: Pixar Bricktoons, the short follows Miguel returning to the Land of the Dead, and trying to sing a winning song in a Battle of the Bands contest with the help of his family.

== Video games ==
Miguel, Dante, and Héctor appear as playable characters in the discontinued mobile game Disney Heroes: Battle Mode. Miguel, Héctor, and Ernesto da la Cruz appear as playable characters in the racing video game Disney Speedstorm beginning with its 22nd season, Bridge of Marigolds, along with a track environment based on the Land of the Dead.

In 2019, the video game Disney Magic Kingdoms included a limited-time event based on Coco, with a storyline that takes place after the events of the film, including Miguel Rivera, Héctor Rivera, Dante, Abuelita, Mamá Coco, Ernesto de la Cruz and Mamá Imelda, as playable characters, as well as attractions based on locations of the film, including Land of the Dead, Musical Celebration, Rivera Familia Home, and Santa Cecilia Market Shop. After the event, the content of the film returned in limited-time promotions.

A world based on Coco and its characters will be included in the video game Kingdom Hearts IV.

== Cast and characters ==
List indicator

This section includes characters who have appeared in the franchise.

- An empty grey cell indicates the character was not in the piece of media.
- ^{A} indicates an appearance through previously recorded material..
- ^{S} indicates an appearance as a character's singing voice.

Characters	Theatrical films	Short films	
Characters	Coco	Dante's Lunch	Family Bands Together
Miguel	Anthony Gonzalez	Anthony Gonzalez	Ryan Lopez Anthony Gonzalez^{A}^{S}
Héctor	Gael García Bernal		Gael Garcia Bernal
Mamá Imelda	Alanna Ubach		Alanna Ubach
Ernesto de la Cruz	Benjamin Bratt	Silent cameo	
Abuelita Elena	Renée Victor	Renée Victor	
Mamá Coco	Ana Ofelia Murguía		Character is mute
Tía Rosita	Selene Luna		Character is mute
Tía Victoria	Dyana Ortellí		Character is mute
Tíos Oscar and Felipe	Herbert Sigüenza		Character is mute
Papá Julio	Alfonso Arau		Character is mute
Papá Enrique	Jaime Camil	Character is mute	
Mamá Luisa	Sofía Espinosa	Character is mute	
Tío Berto	Luis Valdez	Character is mute	
Tía Gloria	Carla Medina	Character is mute	
Abel	Polo Rojas	Character is mute	
Rosa	Montse Hernandez	Character is mute	
Chicharrón	Edward James Olmos		
Plaza Mariachi	Lombardo Boyar		
Arrival Agent	Octavio Solis		
Clerk	Gabriel Iglesias		
Corrections Officer	Cheech Marin		
Emcee	Blanca Araceli		Blanca Araceli
Security Guard	Salvador Reyes		
Juan Ortodoncia	John Ratzenberger		

== Crew ==
Film	Release date(s)	Director(s)	Writers	Producer(s)	Executive Producer(s)	Composer	Editor(s)	Runtimes
Coco	November 22, 2017	Lee Unkrich co-directed by: Adrian Molina	Original Story by: Lee Unkrich; Jason Katz; Matthew Aldrich; Adrian Molina Screenplay by: Adrian Molina; Matthew Aldrich	Darla K. Anderson	John Lasseter	Michael Giacchino	Steve Bloom	105 Minutes
Coco 2	November 21, 2029	Lee Unkrich co-directed by: Adrian Molina	TBA	Mark Nielsen	Pete Docter; Jonas Rivera	TBA	TBA	TBA

== Reception ==
=== Box office performance ===
The first film was the eleventh highest-grossing film of 2017, and is the 24th highest grossing animated film of all time.

Film	U.S. release date	Box office gross			Budget	Ref.
Film	U.S. release date	U.S. and Canada	Other territories	Worldwide	Budget	Ref.
Coco	November 22, 2017	$210,460,015	$604,181,157	$814,641,172	$175 million	
Total		$210,460,015	$604,181,157	$814,641,172	$175 million	

=== Critical and public response ===
Film	Critical		Public	
Film	Rotten Tomatoes	Metacritic	CinemaScore	PostTrak
Coco	97% (357 reviews)	81 (48 reviews)	A+	—N/a

=== Accolades ===
Coco received awards for Best Animated Feature and Best Original Song, the BAFTA Award for Best Animated Film, the Critics' Choice Movie Award for Best Animated Feature, and the Golden Globe Award for Best Animated Feature Film.

== Other media ==
=== Other animated media ===
In The Simpsons short Plusaversary (2021), Miguel appears as one of the attendees at the party in Moe's Tavern.

=== Broadway adaptation ===
On January 24, 2023, during Epcot's annual Disney on Broadway concert, The Lion King actor Steven Taylor announced that a live stage show adaptation of the film is currently in development at Disney Theatrical Productions.

=== Theme parks ===
Miguel appears in Frontierland at Disneyland as a meet and greet character. The 3D show Mickey's PhilharMagic contains a scene featuring Miguel and Héctor singing "Un Poco Loco". In May 2025, figures of Miguel and Dante were added in the It's a Small World attraction at Disneyland in the section portraying Mexico.

==== Unnamed Coco attraction ====
In August 2024, it was announced that a ride is in development for Disney California Adventure. Construction began in 2026. The attraction will be set a year after the events of the original film, and will be a boat ride in which park guests travel through Miguel's memories of the Land of the Dead. Additionally, the attraction will include references to Coco 2.
