= Gladys Hansen =

- Born: Gladys Cox; June 12, 1925; Berkeley, California
- Died: March 5, 2017 (aged 91); San Francisco, California
- Education: Lowell High School
- Occupation: Librarian • archivist • author
- Spouse: William Hansen
- Writing career
- Subject: History of San Francisco
- Notable work: Denial of Disaster

Gladys Cox Hansen (June 12, 1925 – March 5, 2017) was an American librarian, archivist and author. She was an expert on the history of San Francisco and the 1906 San Francisco earthquake.

== Early life and education ==
Hansen was born in 1925 in Berkeley, California. She moved to San Francisco as a child, and lived there for the rest of her life. She graduated from Lowell High School and attended San Francisco State College (now San Francisco State University) briefly, but did not earn a degree.

== Career ==
At age 17, Hansen began working part-time at the Presidio branch of the San Francisco Public Library. She then moved to the main branch, and by 1963 she was in charge of the California collection of the library. In 1972, she was named city archivist by Mayor Joseph Alioto.

In 1963, Hansen began to research the identities of those killed in 1906 earthquake. In 1989, Hansen co-authored the book Denial of Disaster, claiming that the number of casualties from the earthquake was dramatically and deliberately understated. The official death toll stated in 1907 was 478, but she estimated that over 3,000 were killed.

Hansen retired from the San Francisco Main Library in 1992, but continued her work on identifying earthquake victims. In 2005, the San Francisco Board of Supervisors unanimously passed a resolution, co-authored by Hansen, that set aside (de-certified) the official 1907 death count.

In 1991, Hansen founded the Museum of the City of San Francisco. She also created a virtual museum website.

Aside from her library work, Hansen established San Francisco City Guides, a volunteer organization that gives walking tours of the city.

In 1997, Hansen received the Ron Ross Founder's Award from the San Francisco History Association.

== Personal life ==
Hansen married William Hansen, who was an Air Corps pilot in World War II. They had a son, Richard.

== Death ==
Hansen died of natural causes in San Francisco on March 5, 2017, at the age of 91.

== Selected publications ==
- Gladys C. Hansen; William F. Heintz (1970). The Chinese in California: a Brief Bibliographic History. Richard Abel & Company Inc. ISBN 9781111671631.
- Gladys C. Hansen (1980). San Francisco Almanac: Everything You Want to Know about the City. Presidio Press. ISBN 9780891410928.
- Gladys C. Hansen; Emmet Condon (1989). Denial of Disaster. Cameron and Company. ISBN 9780918684332.
- Richard Hansen; Gladys Hansen (2013). 1906 San Francisco Earthquake. Arcadia Publishing. ISBN 9780738596587.
- Gladys Hansen; Richard Hansen; William Blaisdell (April 5, 2013). Earthquake, Fire and Epidemic: Personal Accounts of the 1906 Disaster. Untreed Reads. ISBN 9781611875423.
