= 1906 (novel) =

2004 historical novel by James Dalessandro

- First edition cover
- Author: James Dalessandro
- Language: English
- Subject: San Francisco earthquake
- Genre: Historical fiction
- Publisher: Chronicle Books
- Publication date: 2004
- Publication place: United States
- Media type: Print; Audiobook; E-book
- Pages: 368
- ISBN: 0811843130
- OCLC: 53231790
- Dewey Decimal: 820
- LC Class: PS

1906 is a 2004 American historical novel written by James Dalessandro. With a 38-page outline and six finished chapters, he pitched it around Hollywood in 1998 for a film by the same name, based upon events surrounding the great San Francisco earthquake and fire of 1906.

== Background ==
James Dalessandro grants his book was partially inspired by a 1989 non-fiction work by Gladys Hansen, curator of the Museum of the City of San Francisco. When looking for research materials in 1996, he found Denial of Disaster: The Untold Story and Photographs of the San Francisco Earthquake and Fire of 1906 in a bookstore. He also explained use of meticulous personal research. Book scenes with people lying in shock in Golden Gate Park after the quake while surrounded by their possessions was inspired by fact. Enrico Caruso was found wandering in the park, having slept the night there after the Palace Hotel was destroyed. Dalessandro granted a lot of research but use of imagination as well. The novel's depictions were pieced together from letters and observations. In reflecting on how some persons took bathtubs out of their damaged homes, placed them on roller skates, and then filed the tubs with possessions, he noted that the displaced persons would save what was valuable to them... their favorite skillet, grandfather clocks, and pets. When asked to describe 1906 San Francisco, Dalessandro offered that it was "Paris and part Dodge City", expanding that at the time the city "was urbane and sophisticated" while at the same time being The Barbary Coast and fistfights. In handling the then-existing corruption and investigations in San Francisco, he condensed actual situations that had developed over many months into a shorter timespan and with a changing of names. Dalessandro also notes that his researches found the claimed death toll of 478 persons killed by the quake and fire, held as an official count for over 100 years, to be inaccurate. In 2005 the San Francisco Board of Supervisors granted a petition from Dalessandro and Hansen, and raised the count to over 3,000.

== Synopsis ==
Set during the time of the great San Francisco earthquake and fire, this novel is a story of corruption, romance, revenge, rescue, and murder, based on recently uncovered facts that stand to change the understanding of what actually occurred in the weeks and days before and after the earthquake of April 18, 1906. In a narrative told by reporter Annalisa Passarelli, the novel describes Gilded Age-era San Francisco from the opulent mansions on Nob Hill to the gambling, prostitution and crime-ridden Barbary Coast to the arrival of Enrico Caruso and the San Francisco Metropolitan Opera. The central plot of the novel circles around the ongoing battles between political and cultural factions before the earthquake, and even as the city burns afterwards.

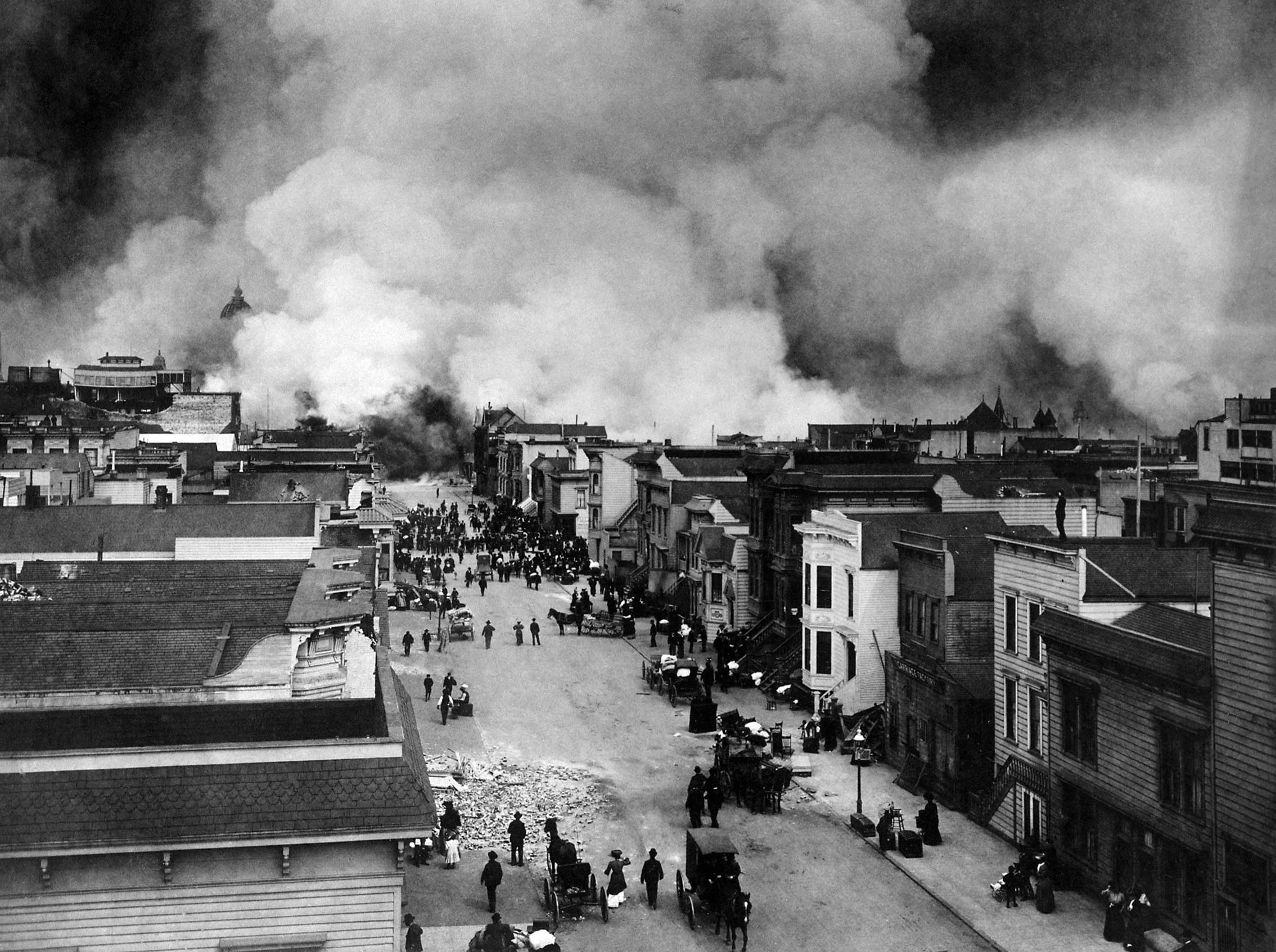
Burning of San Francisco, Mission District (1906)

Annalisa Passarelli is a music critic for The Evening Bulletin and is secretly helping the police gather evidence of corruption related to the incumbency of Mayor Eugene Schmitz. Chief of Detectives Byron Fallon hopes to arrest the corrupt mayor, police chief, and city attorney in one fell swoop, but is killed when investigating a waterfront murder. After his death, his son Hunter, a Stanford graduate and amateur detective, steps up to accept his father's mission. Hunter's brother Christian co-leads The Brotherhood, an association of honest police who are dedicated to overthrowing city corruption. Annalisa and Hunter appeal to The Brotherhood for assistance and incriminating evidence is secured, while at the same time the two grow fond of each other. Before the information can be acted upon, the earthquake strikes and the city is thrown into chaos.

== Critical response ==
Publishers Weekly wrote that the book was an "imaginative and dense interplay" of both fact and fiction surrounding the events of the great quake. While observing that the through plot and numerous sub-plots, the storyline generally worked. It was offered that the author used "too many B-movie theatrics" and the love story portion of the book suffered. Those weaknesses aside, the reviewer wrote "there's plenty of suspense to keep readers turning pages to the bittersweet conclusion."

San Francisco Weekly decried the mixing of real persons with fictional, as it was felt that the combining of fiction with fact by attributing fictional dialogue to actual persons works to the detriment of history.

Contrarily, Kirkus Reviews offered that Dalessandro's mixing of historical fact with fiction "pays off with an exciting and vivid depiction of history."

== Potential film adaptation ==
=== Concept ===
The original idea for a screenplay came to Dalessandro when researching 1906 as a prequel to his 1993 historical mystery novel Bohemian Heart. He had finished a 38-page outline and six chapters of the novel when his manager suggested the success of Titanic would make the project salable. When the concept was pitched to production companies in July 1998, there was an instant bidding war, and within 24 hours a script had been sold to Warner Bros. Pictures. Film producer Len Amato wanted Dalessandro to write at least three drafts. After completing the drafts, Dalessandro returned to writing the novel and published it in 2004.

=== Film pre-production ===
The estimated budget of the film adaptation was $200 million. Due to the massive size and scale of the project, the film was being financially backed by Walt Disney Pictures, Pixar and Warner Bros. Pictures. The project would have been the first time Pixar had been involved in a live-action film, and the first collaboration with Disney and Warner Bros. since The Prestige in 2006.

Brad Bird was announced as the director. He paused his work on the project after being approached by Pixar management to direct and co-write the 2007 animated film Ratatouille, before officially signing onto the 1906 project in March 2008, at which time Warner Bros. reserved all sound-studios available on their Burbank lot for production. However, later that spring, Warner Bros. quietly released the reservations while Brad Bird continued rewriting the screenplay in order to lessen the massive scope of the story.

In 2009, MTV News reported that director Brad Bird had been scouting locations. Information from Dalessandro indicated that the film would likely be shot in Vancouver, New Zealand or Australia.

In 2011, it was reported by Brad Bird that the film project was still being developed. The issues he raised was his difficulty in narrowing the scope of such a manner as to be true to the story within the constraints of practical film length.

I don't know. It's all about getting the story to work, and the canvas is so big on it that it's easy to bust down its movie-sized walls and go rampaging throughout the countryside. The problem has always been scaling it and containing it in a movie-sized length. It's really a movie that wants to be a miniseries. But if you did it as a miniseries, then you'd have to do it for the small screen, and the story demands to be told on a big screen. So we're still working on it.

In February 2012, it was revealed that a rewrite of Dalessandro's script had been completed by Michael Hirst, and Brad Bird was now rewriting it yet again. The film is currently in development hell.

=== Possible resurrection ===
In June 2018, Bird mentioned the possibility of adapting the book as a TV series, and the earthquake sequence as a live-action feature film. In July 2026, Bird explained how further research helped him realize that the expansive narrative of corruption, the massive earthquake, and the devastating fire lends itself much better to an eight-episode miniseries format instead of a full-length feature film and claimed he might revive the project entirely.
