= Inside Out (franchise) =

Pixar media franchise

- Created by: Pete Docter; Ronnie del Carmen
- Developed by: Pete Docter Meg LeFauve Josh Cooley
- Original work: Inside Out (2015)
- Owners: Pixar Animation Studios (The Walt Disney Company)
- Years: 2015–present

Films and television
- Films: Inside Out (2015); Inside Out 2 (2024)
- Short film: Riley's First Date? (2015)
- Animated series: Dream Productions (2024)

Games
- Video games: Inside Out Thought Bubbles (2015); Disney Infinity 3.0 (2015)^{*}; Disney Crossy Road (2016)^{*}; Disney Emoji Blitz (2016)^{*}; Disney Magic Kingdoms (2016)^{*}; Lego The Incredibles (2018)^{*}; Disney Heroes: Battle Mode (2018)^{*}; Disney Speedstorm (2024)^{*}; Disney Dreamlight Valley (2025)^{*}

Audio
- Soundtracks: Inside Out (2015); Inside Out 2 (2024)

Miscellaneous
- Theme park attractions: Inside Out Emotional Whirlwind (2019–present); Inside Out: Joyful Sweets (2022)
- ^{*} Work where this franchise's characters or settings appeared as part of a crossover.

Inside Out is an American media franchise created by Pete Docter and Ronnie del Carmen. It takes place inside the mind of a girl named Riley Andersen, where multiple personified emotions administer her thoughts and actions. The franchise is produced by Pixar Animation Studios and distributed by its parent company Walt Disney Studios Motion Pictures. It began with the 2015 film of the same name, and was followed by Inside Out 2 (2024). The franchise also includes a short film, an animated series, several video games, and two theme park attractions.

== Films ==
Film	U.S. release date	Directed by	Screenplay by	Story by	Produced by
Inside Out	June 19, 2015	Pete Docter	Pete Docter & Meg LeFauve & Josh Cooley	Pete Docter & Ronnie del Carmen	Jonas Rivera
Inside Out 2	June 14, 2024	Kelsey Mann	Meg LeFauve & Dave Holstein	Kelsey Mann & Meg LaFauve	Mark Nielsen

=== Inside Out (2015) ===
Inside Out follows the inner workings of the mind of Riley, a young girl who adapts to her family's relocation as five personified emotions administer her thoughts and actions.

Director Pete Docter conceived Inside Out in October 2009 after observing changes in his daughter's personality as she grew older. (Note: Attributed to multiple references:) Docter invited Ronnie del Carmen, who had previously worked as story supervisor on Finding Nemo (2003) and Up (2009), to come on as co-director, a role del Carmen accepted. They sought inspiration for the film from their own personal histories and experiences, including del Carmen's inspiration through his upbringing, and consulted psychologists and neuroscientists in an effort to portray the mind with greater accuracy. The film's principal characters were cast in August 2013. Development lasted for five and a half years. Inside Out debuted at the 68th Cannes Film Festival on May 18, 2015, and was released in the United States on June 19.

=== Inside Out 2 (2024) ===
Inside Out 2 follows a teenage Riley with four new emotions who join the original five, with opposing views on what kind of person Riley should be as she strives to prove herself at a hockey camp.

Development of Inside Out 2 was first announced in 2022 during the D23 Expo announcement. It features Docter's "five to 27 emotions" idea from the first film that new director Kelsey Mann pitched during its production to utilize "truthful" worldbuilding. Like the first film, psychologists were consulted with during production, and also had a group of teenagers who gave feedback to various early screenings of the film. Inside Out 2 debuted at the El Capitan Theatre on June 10, 2024 and screened at the 2024 Annecy International Animation Film Festival on the same day. The film was released in the United States on June 14.

== Short film ==
=== Riley's First Date? (2015) ===
Riley's First Date? was released on November 3, 2015, on the first film's Blu-ray release with Josh Cooley as director and writer.

The short follows the events of the 2015 film Inside Out and involves Riley's parents and their emotions, suspecting that Riley is going out on a date with a boy named Jordan.

== Streaming series ==
Dream Productions premiered on Disney+ on December 11, 2024. It is a streaming series based on Inside Out that was produced by Pixar and developed by Soul co-writer Mike Jones. It explores how the dreams inside Riley's mind are made, and is set between the events of the first and second films.

== Video games ==
=== Inside Out Thought Bubbles (2015) ===
Inside Out Thought Bubbles is a mobile Puzzle Bobble-style game, released in 2015 for some app stores. Riley's new emotions were added to the game starting in June 2024 to coincide with the release of Inside Out 2.

=== In other games ===
Disney Infinity 3.0 (2015) includes a platformer-type Inside Out playset featuring the emotions as playable characters.

Inside Out characters are featured in Disney Crossy Road (2016), Disney Emoji Blitz (2016), and Disney Heroes: Battle Mode (2018).

Bing Bong becomes a playable character in Lego The Incredibles (2018), and Disney Mirrorverse (2022) includes an alternate version of Anger as a playable character.

In June 2023, an update with a limited time event based on Inside Out was released in the world-building game Disney Magic Kingdoms, including the five emotions as playable characters, as well as the emotions' Headquarters and Inside Out Emotional Whirlwind as attractions. In December 2024, during another limited time event, this time focused on Inside Out 2, Anxiety, Ennui and Envy were added as characters, along with Rumor Mill as attraction. In January 2025, Nostalgia was included to unlock during the premium Season Pass of the game, while in the premium content of the next Season Pass, included in April of that year, were included Embarrassment and the Fort Pillowton attraction.

On June 13, 2024, the day before Inside Out 2's release, kart-racing game Disney Speedstorm began its eighth season, Journey of Emotions, which is based on Inside Out. The season added a track environment based on Riley's Mind, with all five original emotions plus Anxiety and Ennui added as playable racers. Additionally, several other Inside Out characters were added as crew members, with different moods of Riley Andersen being the epic crew member for each of the emotions.

On August 20, 2025, two months after the 10th anniversary of the original film, Disney Dreamlight Valley began its Update 18, Emotional Rescue, Joy and Sadness to joining the villagers, including Inside Out Realm.

== Cast and characters ==
The five main emotions of Inside Out Left to right: Anger (Lewis Black), Disgust (Mindy Kaling in the first film, Liza Lapira in the second film), Joy (Amy Poehler), Fear (Bill Hader in the first film, Tony Hale in the second film), and Sadness (Phyllis Smith)

List indicator

This section includes characters who have appeared in the franchise.

- An empty grey cell indicates the character was not in the piece of media.

Characters	Theatrical films		Video games	Short film	Streaming series
Characters	Inside Out	Inside Out 2	Inside Out Thought Bubbles	Riley's First Date?	Dream Productions
Joy	Amy Poehler	Amy Poehler	Kate Higgins	Amy Poehler	Amy Poehler
Sadness	Phyllis Smith	Phyllis Smith	Phyllis Smith	Phyllis Smith	Phyllis Smith
Anger	Lewis Black	Lewis Black	Lewis Black	Lewis Black	Lewis Black
Fear	Bill Hader	Tony Hale	Bill Hader	Bill Hader	Tony Hale
Disgust	Mindy Kaling	Liza Lapira	Ashley Adler	Mindy Kaling	Liza Lapira
Riley Andersen	Kaitlyn Dias	Kensington Tallman	Kaitlyn Dias	Kaitlyn Dias	Kensington Tallman
Mrs. Andersen	Diane Lane	Diane Lane		Diane Lane	Diane Lane
Mr. Andersen	Kyle MacLachlan	Kyle MacLachlan		Kyle MacLachlan	Kyle MacLachlan
Bing Bong	Richard Kind		Character is mute		
Jangles	Josh Cooley		Josh Cooley		
Mom's Joy	Sherry Lynn	Sherry Lynn		Sherry Lynn	
Mom's Disgust	Sherry Lynn	Sherry Lynn		Sherry Lynn	
Mom's Sadness	Lori Alan	Lori Alan		Lori Alan	
Mom's Anger	Paula Pell	Paula Pell		Paula Pell	
Mom's Fear	Laraine Newman	Laraine Newman		Laraine Newman	
Dad's Fear	Carlos Alazraqui	Carlos Alazraqui		Carlos Alazraqui	
Dad's Anger	Pete Docter	Pete Docter		Pete Docter	
Dad's Joy	Character is mute	Character is mute		Patrick Seitz	
Dad's Sadness	Character is mute	Character is mute		Josh Cooley	
Fritz	John Ratzenberger	John Ratzenberger			
Forgetter Bobby	Bobby Moynihan	Bobby Moynihan			
Forgetter Paula	Paula Poundstone	Paula Poundstone	Character is mute		
Mind Worker Cop Jake	Flea	Flea			
Mind Cop Frank	Dave Goelz	Dave Goelz			
Mind Cop Dave	Frank Oz	Frank Oz			
Paula Persimmon	Paula Pell				Paula Pell
Jordan	Character is mute	Photograph		Ben Cox	
Anxiety		Maya Hawke	Maya Hawke		
Envy		Ayo Edebiri	Ayo Edebiri		
Embarrassment		Paul Walter Hauser	Character is mute		
Ennui	Deleted scene	Adèle Exarchopoulos	Adèle Exarchopoulos		
Valentina "Val" Ortiz		Lilimar			
Bree Young		Sumayyah Nuriddin-Green			Sumayyah Nuriddin-Green
Grace Hsieh		Grace Lu			Grace Lu
Bloofy		Ron Funches			
Pouchy		James Austin Johnson			
Coach Roberts		Yvette Nicole Brown			
Lance Slashblade		Yong Yea			
Nostalgia		June Squibb			
Deep Dark Secret		Steve Purcell			
Xeni					Richard Ayoade
Jean Dewberry					Maya Rudolph
Janelle Johnson					Ally Maki
"Teen Riley"					Lauren Holt

== Crew ==
Film	Director(s)	Writers	Producer(s)	Executive Producer(s)	Composer	Editor(s)
Inside Out	Pete Docter co-directed by: Ronnie del Carmen	Original Story by: Pete Docter; Ronnie del Carmen Screenplay by: Pete Docter; Meg LeFauve; Josh Cooley	Jonas Rivera	John Lasseter; Andrew Stanton	Michael Giacchino	Kevin Nolting
Inside Out 2	Kelsey Mann	Story by: Kelsey Mann; Meg LeFauve Screenplay by: Meg LeFauve; Dave Holstein	Mark Nielsen	Pete Docter; Jonas Rivera; Dan Scanlon	Andrea Datzman	Maurissa Horwitz

== Reception ==
=== Box office performance ===
The first film was the seventh highest-grossing film of 2015, and is the 22nd highest grossing animated film of all time.

The second film is the highest-grossing film of 2024, the highest-grossing animated film of all time, and the eighth highest-grossing film of all time. It holds several records, including the highest worldwide debut in Pixar history, the third-highest opening for an animated film domestically, the highest-grossing Pixar film of all time, and the highest-grossing animated film domestically, the latter two surpassing Incredibles 2. It managed to outperform the first film in just two weeks. It also became the second animated film to gross $1 billion internationally.

Inside Out is the seventh highest grossing animated film series.

Film	U.S. release date	Box office gross			Budget	Ref.
Film	U.S. release date	U.S. and Canada	Other territories	Worldwide	Budget	Ref.
Inside Out	June 19, 2015	$356,461,711	$501,149,463	$857,611,174	$175 million	
Inside Out 2	June 14, 2024	$652,980,194	$1,045,798,243	$1,698,778,437	$200 million	
Total		$1,009,441,905	$1,546,947,706	$2,556,389,611	$375 million	

=== Critical and public response ===
Film	Critical		Public	
Film	Rotten Tomatoes	Metacritic	CinemaScore	PostTrak
Inside Out	98% (385 reviews)	94 (55 reviews)	A	—N/a
Inside Out 2	91% (329 reviews)	73 (59 reviews)	A	—N/a
Dream Productions	75% (20 reviews)	67 (14 reviews)	—N/a	—N/a

=== Accolades ===
The first film won the Academy Award for Best Animated Feature, the BAFTA Award for Best Animated Film, the Critics' Choice Movie Award for Best Animated Feature, and the Golden Globe Award for Best Animated Feature Film.

== Theme park attractions ==
Inside Out Emotional Whirlwind, a spinner ride, has run since 2019 at Disney California Adventure. Emotions at Play with Pixar's Inside Out is an exhibit at the Children's Museum of Pittsburgh that has been in operation since 2021. It features activities based on scenes from the first film. A confectionery store, Inside Out: Joyful Sweets, opened on Disney Wish in July 2022, and will open to Disney Believe in late 2027.

== Impact on therapy ==
Collective knowledge of the Inside Out franchise has been used for therapy, due to being about physical representations of emotions, which can help children and older people understand emotions. Mental health professionals have praised the franchise for not villainizing any emotion.
