= Phyllis Smith =

American actress (born 1949)

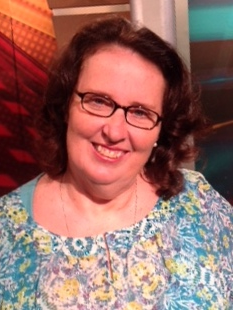
- Smith in 2014
- Born: August 15, 1949 (age 77); St. Louis, Missouri, U.S.
- Education: University of Missouri–St. Louis
- Occupation: Actress
- Years active: 1991–present

Phyllis Smith (born August 15, 1949) is an American actress and casting director. She is best known for playing Phyllis Vance in the television series The Office and her voice role as Sadness in Pixar's animated franchise Inside Out.

== Early life and education ==
Smith was born on August 15, 1949, in St. Louis, Missouri. She graduated from Cleveland High School.

Smith graduated from the University of Missouri–St. Louis in 1972 with a degree in elementary education. In the 1970s and 1980s, she was a dancer, a cheerleader for the St. Louis Cardinals football team, and a burlesque performer. She said that there was "no stripping, but I did wear feathers." She was forced to quit dancing after suffering a knee injury, and later worked in Hollywood, California, as an actress and in casting.

== Career ==
Smith was working as a casting associate under the direction of Allison Jones on the television series The Office, when she was offered the role of Phyllis Lapin, a character created specifically for her, a soft-spoken saleswoman who tended to disagree with pompous office manager Michael Scott. She received Screen Actors Guild Awards in 2006 and 2007 for her performance in The Office in the category "Outstanding Performance by an Ensemble in a Comedy Series". In June 2008, she appeared with the cast of The Office on Celebrity Family Feud.

In 2011, Smith played a supporting role in the film Bad Teacher. In 2015, she voiced the character Sadness in the Pixar film Inside Out, receiving high critical praise for her performance. In 2016, she starred as Betty Broderick-Allen in the Netflix series The OA. She reprised her role as Sadness in Inside Out 2 in 2024.

== Filmography ==
=== Film ===
Year	Title	Role	Notes
2006	I Want Someone to Eat Cheese With	Marsha	
2011	Bad Teacher	Lynn	
2011	Butter	Nancy	
2011	Alvin and the Chipmunks: Chipwrecked	Flight Attendant	
2015	Inside Out	Sadness (voice)	Annie Award for Outstanding Achievement for Voice Acting in a Feature Production
2015	Riley's First Date?	Sadness (voice)	Short film
2021	Barb and Star Go to Vista Del Mar	Delores	
2024	Inside Out 2	Sadness (voice)	

=== Television ===
Year	Title	Role	Notes
2005	Arrested Development	Carla	Episode: "The Immaculate Election"
2005–2013	The Office	Phyllis Vance	Screen Actors Guild Award for Outstanding Performance by an Ensemble in a Comedy Series (2007–2008); Nominated – Screen Actors Guild Award for Outstanding Performance by an Ensemble in a Comedy Series (2009–2013)
2013	Trophy Wife	Mrs. Patty Steinberg	3 episodes
2014	The Middle	Mrs. Huff	Episode: "The Sinkhole"
2016–2019	The OA	Betty Broderick-Allen	12 episodes
2024	Chad	Herself	Episode: "Class President"
2024	Dream Productions	Sadness (voice)	4 episodes

=== Video games ===
Year	Title	Role	Notes
2015	Disney Infinity 3.0	Sadness	Voice
2024	Disney Speedstorm	Sadness	Voice

=== Web series ===
Year	Title	Role	Notes
2006	The Office: The Accountants	Phyllis Vance	Episode: "Phyllis"
2008	The Office: The Outburst	Phyllis Vance	Episode: "The Explanation"

=== Production work ===
Year	Title	Position	Notes
1999	Roswell	Assistant casting director	1 episode
2000–2002	Spin City	Assistant casting director	45 episodes
2005	Curb Your Enthusiasm	Assistant casting director	10 episodes
2005	The Office	Assistant casting director	6 episodes
