= Kate Higgins =

American voice actress

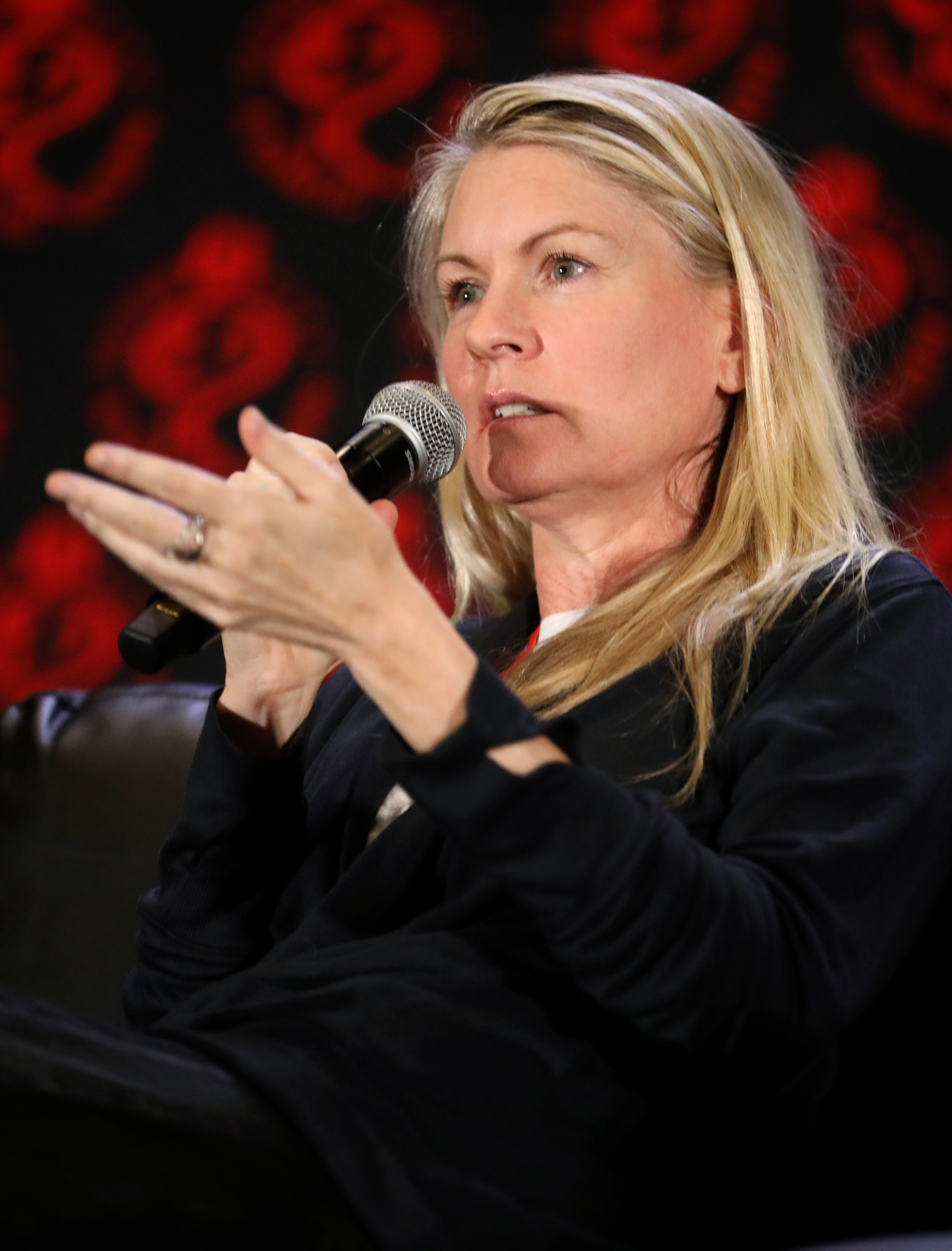
- Higgins in 2024
- Born: August 16, 1969 (age 57); Charlottesville, Virginia
- Other name: Kate Davis
- Education: Auburn University
- Occupations: Voice actress; singer; jazz pianist
- Years active: 1991–present
- Agent: William Morris Agency
- Musical career
- Genre: Jazz
- Instruments: Piano; vocals
- Member of: Auburn Knights; Upper Structure
- Website: www.katehiggins.com

Kate Higgins is an American voice actress, singer and jazz pianist. She is best known for her voice-acting roles of Sakura Haruno in Naruto, C.C. in Code Geass, Miles "Tails" Prower in the video game series Sonic the Hedgehog, Frankie Stein in Monster High, Sailor Mercury in Sailor Moon, Pauline in Super Mario, Barbie in Barbie: Life in the Dreamhouse, and as Purah in The Legend of Zelda: Tears of the Kingdom and Hyrule Warriors: Age of Calamity.

== Early life ==
Higgins attended Auburn University where she studied music with jazz artist Bob Richardson. She would often play classical piano in her mother's Opelika restaurant, The Greenhouse. Higgins was a member of the band the Auburn Knights and has played shows at various bars and lounges. She graduated in 1991 with a degree in music and moved to Los Angeles to pursue her music career.

== Career ==
=== Voice acting career ===
Higgins first worked on commercials with singing after graduating, then landed a small voice-acting job as a singing cartoon squirrel. She was then approached to be a voice-over actress to do bumpers for the Disney Channel in 1998. Since then Higgins's major voice roles have been in English-language adaptations of Japanese anime, and she is best known as the voice of Sakura Haruno in Naruto and Talho Yuuki in Eureka 7. She has also voiced C.C. in Code Geass and Saber in the original Fate/stay night. Between 2010 and 2013, Higgins voiced Tails in the video game series Sonic the Hedgehog. In 2014, Higgins was cast as Sailor Mercury in the Viz English dub of Sailor Moon. She is the current voice of Princess Aurora since 2010, a Disney Princess character originally seen in Walt Disney's Sleeping Beauty. She also played the voice of Frankie Stein in Monster High and Briar Beauty in Ever After High. She also starred as Barbie in Barbie: Life in the Dreamhouse in 2012. Since the release of Super Mario Odyssey in 2017, she has been the voice of Pauline in the Mario franchise.

=== Music career ===
Higgins is a trained jazz pianist. In 2002, she released her first jazz album, The Tide is Low. Her second jazz album is Stealing Freedom. She is also in a band called Upper Structure.

== Filmography ==
=== Anime ===
List of dubbing performances in anime
Year	Title	Role	Notes	Ref.
1999	Cowboy Bebop	Various		Resume
2002	I'll CKBC	Sumire Yoshikawa		Resume
2002	Marmalade Boy	Meiko Akizuki	As Kate Davis	Resume
2002–2003	Great Teacher Onizuka	Chikako Shirai, Mayuko Asano		Resume
2002–2003	Overman King Gainer	Meey Laujin		Resume
2004	Initial D	Simone (Sayuki)	Tokyopop dub	Resume
2004	Ghost in the Shell: Stand Alone Complex	Children, Girl		CA
2004	Here Is Greenwood	Miya Igarashi	Media Blasters dub	CA
2004	Hanaukyo Maid Team	Sanae Yashima		Resume
2004	Tenjho Tenge	Emi Isuzu		Resume
2004	Tsukihime	Hisui		Resume
2005	Scrapped Princess	Zefiris		CA
2005	Zatch Bell!	Megumi Oumi, Kolulu, Laila		CA
2005	Planetes	Eldegard Rivera		CA
2005	Mars Daybreak	Ester Ein Astrada		CA
2005	Immortal Grand Prix	Jessica Darlin		CA
2005	Gad Guard	Mimi		Resume
2005	Grenadier	Ai		Resume
2005–2009	Naruto	Sakura Haruno		
2006	Kannazuki no Miko	Otoha Kisaragi		
2006	Karas	Homura		CA
2006	GunXSword	Vivian	Ep. 10	CA
2006	Fate/stay night	Saber		
2006	Samurai Champloo	Yoshiko		Resume
2006–2007	Eureka Seven	Talho Yūki		
2006–2014	Bleach	Karin Kurosaki, Nanao Ise, Retsu Unohana, Lilynette Gingerbuck		CA
2007	Digimon Data Squad	Miki Kurosaki		CA
2008	Lucky Star	Nanako Kuroi, Hikage Miyakawa		
2008–2009	Code Geass: Lelouch of the Rebellion series	C.C.		CA
2009–2019	Naruto: Shippuden	Sakura Haruno		
2011	Marvel Anime: Wolverine	Yukio		Resume
2013-2014	Tenkai Knights	Wakamei Dalton, Mrs. Jones (Ceylan's Mother, Ep. 30)	Main Role	
2014–2019	Sailor Moon	Ami Mizuno / Sailor Mercury	Viz dub	
2015–2016	Glitter Force	Chloe/Glitter Breeze	Saban dub	
2015–2017	Sailor Moon Crystal	Ami Mizuno / Sailor Mercury	Viz dub	
2017	Code Geass: Akito the Exiled	C.C.		
2018	Twin Star Exorcists	Subaru Mitejima		
2019–2023	Boruto: Naruto Next Generations	Sakura Uchiha		
2022–present	Bleach: Thousand-Year Blood War	Nanao Ise, Retsu Unohana/Yachiru Unohana		CA

=== Animation ===
List of voice performances in animation
Year	Title	Role	Notes	Ref.
2001–2002	Jackie Chan Adventures	Simone	Ep. "The Return of the Pussycat"; "The Chosen One"	
2003–2004	All Grown Up!	Leslie, Phonetic Kid	Pilot episode and Ep. "Coup DeVille"; "Runaround Susie"	
2006	Dibo the Gift Dragon	Annie	Lead role and singing	Resume
2007–2008	Animalia	Allegra		Resume
2009	Wolverine and the X-Men	Scarlet Witch, Pixie		
2010	Gnomes and Trolls	Fawn		
2010–2013	Scooby-Doo! Mystery Incorporated	Mayor Janet Nettles, Additional voices		
2010–2016	Monster High series	Frankie Stein, Lilith Van Hellscream		
2013	Sofia the First	Princess Aurora		
2013–2016	Ever After High series	Briar Beauty, Baba Yaga		
2014–2025	Blaze and the Monster Machines	Starla	Main role	
2015	Fresh Beat Band of Spies	Rainbow Raspberry, Loudmouth Lemon, Yi Haw		
2016	Regular Show	Computer, Mary Stone, Natalie Williams, Fi, Icai	Ep. "Alpha Dome"; "Ice Tape"	
2016–2018	Bunnicula	Becky, Barbara		
2016–2019	The Powerpuff Girls	Maylyn, Additional voices	6 episodes	
2017	The Mr. Peabody & Sherman Show	Belle Starr	Ep. "Return of the Guapos Part 2"; "Return of the Guapos Part 3"	
2017	Enchantimals	Felicity Fox, Flick		
2017	Pickle and Peanut	Additional voices	Ep. "Wet Wedding/Tweenage Lupinus"	
2017–2019	Star vs. the Forces of Evil	White Baby Unicorn	5 episodes	
2021	Sonic Colors: Rise of the Wisps	Miles "Tails" Prower	Short animation	
2021	The Patrick Star Show	Additional voices		
2021–2024	Kamp Koral: SpongeBob's Under Years	Narlene		
2021–present	SpongeBob SquarePants	Narlene, Additional voices	4 episodes	
2024-2025	Tales of the Teenage Mutant Ninja Turtles	Mechazoid, Celia Barnacle, Various voices		

=== Films ===
List of voice performances in direct-to-video and television films
Year	Title	Role	Notes	Ref.
2007–present	Naruto films	Sakura Haruno		
2009	Happily N'Ever After 2	Goldilocks		
2009	The Pinky:st. Movie	Karen		
2009	Batgirl: Year One	Barbara Gordon/Batgirl	Audiobook edition	
2009	Barbie: A Fairy Secret	Taylor		
2012	Back to the Sea	Little Fish		
2013	Iron Man: Rise of Technovore	Pepper Potts		
2013	Scooby-Doo! Stage Fright	Meg Gale, Cathy		
2013–2017	Alpha and Omega films	Kate, Stinky, Lilly		
2014	Axel: The Biggest Little Hero	Gaga		
2015	Tyler Perry's Madea's Tough Love	Yoshi		
2016	Norm of the North	Elizabeth		
2016–2018	Digimon Adventure tri.	Gatomon, Meicoomon, Meicrackmon Vicious Mode, Angewomon, Nyaromon, Salamon, Raguelmon, Magnadramon		
2017	Tom and Jerry: Willy Wonka and the Chocolate Factory	Mrs. Bucket		
2020	Digimon Adventure: Last Evolution Kizuna	Gatomon, Angewomon, Mimi Tachikawa		
2022	Drifting Home	Girl Students		
2023	Digimon Adventure 02: The Beginning	Gatomon, Mother		

List of voice performances in feature films
Year	Title	Role	Notes	Ref.
2017	Sailor Moon R: The Movie	Ami Mizuno / Sailor Mercury	Limited theatrical release, Viz dub	
2018	Sailor Moon S: The Movie	Ami Mizuno / Sailor Mercury	Limited theatrical release, Viz dub	
2018	Sailor Moon SuperS: The Movie	Ami Mizuno / Sailor Mercury	Limited theatrical release, Viz dub	
2018	Ralph Breaks the Internet	Princess Aurora		
2019	Code Geass: Lelouch of the Re;surrection	C.C.		
2021	Sailor Moon Eternal	Ami Mizuno / Super Sailor Mercury	Viz dub	
2024	Sailor Moon Cosmos	Ami Mizuno / Eternal Sailor Mercury	Viz dub	
2025	Plankton: The Movie	Ma Plankton		

=== Video games ===
List of voice performances in video games
Year	Title	Role	Notes	Ref.
2004	EverQuest II	Various characters		Resume
2005	Destroy All Humans!	Rural Female		
2006	Rumble Roses XX	Candy Cane (Rebecca Walsh), Becky		CA
2006	Tales of the Abyss	Arietta the Wild		
2006–present	Naruto series	Sakura Haruno		
2006–present	Dead or Alive series	Tina Armstrong, Momiji	starting from Xtreme 2	
2007	Armored Core 4	P. Dam, Meno Lou		In-game credits
2007	Project Sylpheed	Natalie Kong		In-game credits
2007	Digimon World Data Squad	Miki Kurosaki, Manami Nitta, Runaway D		
2007	.hack//G.U. Vol. 3//Redemption	Natsume	English dub	
2007	SpongeBob's Atlantis SquarePantis	Additional Voices		
2008	Culdcept Saga	Rilara		Resume
2008	Destroy All Humans! Big Willy Unleashed	Additional Voices		
2008	The World Ends with You	Uzuki Yashiro, Raimu "Rhyme" Bito		
2008	Ninja Gaiden 2	Momiji, Yoba		
2008	Valkyria Chronicles	Cordelia gi Randgriz, Martha Lipponen, Freesia York	English dub	
2008	Destroy All Humans! Path of the Furon	Faire/Sunnywood Females		
2009	MadWorld	Naomi, RinRin	English dub	
2009	MagnaCarta 2	Rue		
2010	Final Fantasy XIII	Cocoon Inhabitants		
2010	Resonance of Fate	Additional voices		
2010	Sakura Wars: So Long, My Love	Subaru Kujo	(uncredited)	
2010	Valkyria Chronicles 2	Cordelia gi Randgriz		
2010	Final Fantasy XIV	Various characters		
2010	Sonic Free Riders	Miles "Tails" Prower, Wave the Swallow		
2010	Sonic Colors	Miles "Tails" Prower		
2011	Tactics Ogre: Let Us Cling Together	Female narrator		
2011	Sonic Generations	Miles "Tails" Prower, Classic Miles "Tails" Prower		
2011	Kinect Disneyland Adventures	Princess Aurora		
2011	Mario & Sonic at the London 2012 Olympic Games	Miles "Tails" Prower		
2012	Dragon's Dogma	Madeleine		
2012	Ninja Gaiden 3	Momiji		
2012	Resident Evil 6	Deborah Harper		
2012	Sonic & All-Stars Racing Transformed	Miles "Tails" Prower		
2012	Tales of Graces f	Asbel Lhant (child), Pascal		
2013	Fire Emblem Awakening	Lissa		
2013	Marvel Heroes	Scarlet Witch, Jocasta		
2013	Sonic Lost World	Miles "Tails" Prower		
2013	Mario & Sonic at the Sochi 2014 Olympic Winter Games	Miles "Tails" Prower		
2014	Yaiba: Ninja Gaiden Z	Momiji		
2014	Lightning Returns: Final Fantasy XIII	Savannah		
2014	Broken Age	Bottled Water Maiden, Anastasia, Yarn Pal No. 2		
2015	Devil May Cry 4: Special Edition	Lady		
2015	Disney Infinity 3.0	Joy		
2015	Xenoblade Chronicles X	Avatar (Female; Joker)	Grouped under Avatars	
2016	Lego Marvel's Avengers	Thor Girl		
2016	Mario & Sonic at the Rio 2016 Olympic Games	Wave the Swallow		
2017	Fire Emblem Heroes	Serra, Lissa	As Kate Davis	
2017	Clicker Fran	Fran	As Kate Davis	
2017	Agents of Mayhem	MAYHEM Crew member		
2017	Super Mario Odyssey	Pauline	As Kate Davis	
2017	.hack//G.U. Last Recode	Natsume	Vol. 3//Redemption – reboot	
2018	World of Warcraft: Battle for Azeroth	Archmage Tamuura		
2018	Mario Tennis Aces	Pauline	DLC	
2018	Super Smash Bros. Ultimate	Pauline		
2019	Devil May Cry 5	Lady		
2019	Marvel Ultimate Alliance 3: The Black Order	Scarlet Witch		
2019	Mario Kart Tour	Pauline		
2020	Deadly Premonition 2: A Blessing in Disguise	Galena Clarkson, Emma Sanders	Falcon Dash Shahed	
2020	Hyrule Warriors: Age of Calamity	Purah	As Kate Davis	
2021	Neo: The World Ends with You	Uzuki Yashiro		
2021	Mario Golf: Super Rush	Pauline	As Kate Davis	
2021	Sonic Colors: Ultimate	Miles "Tails" Prower		
2021	Psychonauts 2	Sam Boole		
2021	Blaze and the Monster Machines: Axle City Racers	Starla		
2022	Mario Strikers: Battle League	Pauline	As Kate Davis	
2023	Armored Core VI: Fires of Rubicon	V.VI Maeterlinck, additional voices	English dub	
2023	Mario Kart 8 Deluxe	Pauline	Update 3.0.0	
2024	Disney Speedstorm	Joy, Aurora	Listed under "Featuring the Voice Talents Of"	
2024	Super Mario Party Jamboree	Pauline		
2024	Marvel Rivals	Scarlet Witch		
2025	Xenoblade Chronicles X: Definitive Edition	Avatar (Female; Joker), Omomo, additional voices		
2025	Mario Kart World	Pauline		
2025	Disney Dreamlight Valley	Joy, Aurora	Listed under "Featuring the Voice Talents Of"	
2025	Digimon Story: Time Stranger	Additional voices		
2025	Sonic Racing: CrossWorlds	Wave the Swallow		

=== Audio drama ===
List of voice and dubbing performances in audio dramas
Year	Title	Role	Notes	Source
2026	Sonic the Hedgehog Presents: The Chaotix Casefiles	Wave the Swallow, Edna Knackerworth		

== Discography ==
=== Studio albums ===
- The Solid Rock (Concord, 1998)
- The Tide is Low (2002)
- Bigger than Love (Concord, 2006)
- Jazz Standards
- A Very Merry Christmas
- Little Parts (2009)
- Sweet and Blue (2016)

=== Collaborations ===
- 6 by 5 by Upper Structure (2004)

=== Songs ===
- "Jump Up, Super Star!" – Super Mario Odyssey (2017)
- "Break Free (Lead the Way)" – Super Mario Odyssey (2017)
