= Drama Club =

American mockumentary television sitcom

- Created by: Monica Sherer; Madeline Whitby
- Starring: Telci Huynh; Nathan Janak; Lili Brennan; Kensington Tallman; Chase Vacnin; Artyon Celestine
- Country of origin: United States
- Original language: English
- No. of seasons: 1
- No. of episodes: 10

Production
- Executive producers: Shelley Zimmerman; Brin Lukens; Eric Falconer
- Camera setup: Single-camera
- Running time: 22 minutes
- Production companies: AwesomenessTV; Nickelodeon Productions

Original release
- Network: Nickelodeon
- Release: March 20 – May 22, 2021

Drama Club is an American mockumentary sitcom created by Monica Sherer and Madeline Whitby that aired on Nickelodeon from March 20 to May 22, 2021.

== Premise ==
The Tookus Middle School Drama Club has Mack as the new student director, who is excited to take on the school's original new musical, "Minnesota", but after their choreographer suffers an injury, Mack and the kids realized that they need help from a football player.

== Cast and characters ==
=== Main ===
- Telci Huynh as Mack, a former actor in the Drama Club who has transitioned to directing the student production
- Nathan Janak as Oliver, the "star actor" in Drama Club
- Lili Brennan as Darcy, the stage manager, and Mack's best friend and cheerleader in the Drama Club
- Kensington Tallman as Bianca, a social influencer who has become the Drama Club's female lead
- Chase Vacnin as Bench, a football player who is brought into Drama Club because he is a classically trained dancer
- Artyon Celestine as Skip, an enthusiastic member of the Drama Club, with a single line in the musical production, who is excited by Bench's addition to the Club

=== Recurring ===
- John Milhiser as Clyde Sniffet, Drama Club's laid-back faculty advisor
- Neska Rose as Gertie, Drama Club's laconic makeup artist
- Reyn Doi as Kurtis, Drama Club's self-absorbed lighting designer
- Ithmar Enriquez as Principal Gibbins, the new Tookus Middle School principal who has come back to get revenge on Drama Club for destroying his dreams of becoming an actor
- Marcus Folmar as Coach Cobbler, the football coach who forces Bench to join Drama Club as an elective
- Pilot Bunch as Colin, Mack's lab partner in chemistry on whom she may have a crush

== Production and release ==
Drama Club consists of ten half-hour episodes. Episodes of the series premiered on the Nick app and Nick.com a week before they were broadcast on Nickelodeon, starting with the first episode which premiered on the Nick app and Nick.com on March 13, 2021, and on Nickelodeon on March 20, 2021.

== Episodes ==
Episodes were released on the Nick app and Nick.com a week before they were broadcast on Nickelodeon.

No.	Title	Directed by	Written by	Original release date	Prod. code	U.S. viewers (millions)
1	"Pilot" "Drama in the Drama Club"	Nancy Hower	Monica Sherer & Madeline Whitby	March 20, 2021 (Note: The episode was released on YouTube on March 12, 2021, then released on the Nick App and Nick.com on March 13.)	101	0.38
In order to impress the school's new principal, the drama club holds a dance showcase the same day they first assemble in the new school year. The engaged choreographer, however, gets injured. De facto head of the drama club, student director Mack, scrambles to put up a show in time anyway. They reluctantly end up recruiting a football player, Bench, who forgot to choose an elective, but needs one to stay on the football team. Short of resigning, they discover Bench knows ballet and with him as the main performer, they manage to have a mediocre display. Special guest star: John Milhiser Guest stars: Neska Rose as Gertie, Reyn Doi as Kurtis, Ithmar Enriquez as Principal Gibbins, Marcus Folmar as Coach Cobbler
2	"Build A Bench"	Bennet Silverman	Monica Sherer & Madeline Whitby	March 27, 2021	102	0.29
Bench does not understand the premise of acting, pretending to be someone else in order to tell a story. After assigning athletic exercises to the troupe in his capacity as Dance Captain, they turn the tables and try hard making an actor out of Bench. Eventually he gets the pretense, yet this achievement backfires: Bench becomes "Benchamin", an arrogant actor of incontestable authority. By luring him on the football field for a match, the club manages to make him break character. Special guest star: John Milhiser Guest stars: Neska Rose as Gertie, Ithmar Enriquez as Principal Gibbins, Marcus Folmar as Coach Cobbler
3	"Phoneless in Tookus"	Matthew Pollock	Eric Falconer	April 3, 2021	104	0.22
The progress of rehearsals is impeded by actors constantly focusing on their cellphones. Darcy has never owned a cellphone and is thus incapable of relating to the issue. She thinks the situation will improve if the phones were gone. Covertly she collects all members' cellphones and only intends to give them back after a successful rehearsal. As reliant on and addicted to cellphones as they are, the rehearsal faces various kinds of challenges. After convincingly performing a scene without distraction, Darcy discloses where the phones are. Special guest star: John Milhiser Guest stars: Neska Rose as Gertie, Reyn Doi as Kurtis, Pilot Bunch as Colin
4	"Luck Be a Poncho Tonight"	Matthew Pollock	Pang-Ni L. Vogt & Aaron Vaccaro	April 10, 2021	103	0.33
The drama club is having its annual cast party. Haunted by a streak of bad luck, Mack decides to put on her lucky poncho, incurring displeasure with Oliver. In an attempt to make her take it off he sabotages the party. All in vain, Oliver discloses him taking issue about the poncho was in fact a proxy conflict for not having Mack as a co-star anymore, since she assumed the position of Student Director this year. Special guest star: John Milhiser Guest stars: Neska Rose as Gertie, Reyn Doi as Kurtis
5	"15 Sniffets of Fame"	Nancy Hower	Ian McLees & Richard Carl	April 17, 2021	106	0.29
Three weeks ahead of the Minnesota opening night, advance ticket sales are falling short of expectations. To promote their musical, the club decides to piggyback on Mr. Sniffets' sudden fame. Ticket sales go up, yet they discover, desperate for attention as he was, all additional tickets were sold to Mr. Sniffet himself. Doing a musical flash mob together yields actual, though minor results. Special guest star: John Milhiser Guest stars: Neska Rose as Gertie, Marcus Folmar as Coach Cobbler
6	"S.A.D."	Nancy Hower	Monica Sherer & Madeline Whitby	May 1, 2021	105	0.32
The Drama Club hosts its annual School Dance. Darcy asks Mack to accompany her to the event. Mack is not too thrilled about the idea, because when they went together a year ago, Darcy's unrestrained dancing made them an object of ridicule. In the face of her friend's excitement though, Mack is not capable of turning her offer down. She resorts to sabotaging the event, but only achieves to get it moved from the gymnasium to the theater. Bianca, not gotten asked to the dance by a certain boy, shares her spiteful dismissal of the dance with Mack. Together they form a protest, S.A.D. – Students Against Dances, and they picket on the dance night. Darcy arrives and has a frank conversation with Mack. They resolve their conflict and Bianca gives in to her desire to see a certain attending DJ. Special guest star: John Milhiser Guest stars: Reyn Doi as Kurtis, Pilot Bunch as Colin, Marcus Folmar as Coach Cobbler
7	"Slumber Games"	Maureen Bharoocha	Emma Jay	May 8, 2021	107	0.26
Mack signs up the Drama Club with the school's annual capture the flag edition "Slumber Games". The club is not amused, because their last participation made them the school's laughingstock, yet Mack thinks with Bench, a football player, on their team, they can vindicate their reputation. He however joins the games on behalf of his Football Team. During the game he notices he does not want to compete against the Drama Club he is also a member of, neither does he want to let his team down. After eliminating other non-athletic teams, it comes to a face-off between the Drama Club and Football Team. By tricking the football players, the Drama Club steals the final flag. Special guest star: John Milhiser Guest stars: Neska Rose as Gertie, Ithmar Enriquez as Principal Gibbins, Reece Caddell as Simone, Lex Lumpkin as Tanner, Betsy Sodaro as Mrs. Todd
8	"The Phantom of Farth Auditorium" "Phantom of Farth Hall"	Maureen Bharoocha	Pang-Ni Landrum & Aaron Vaccaro	May 15, 2021	108	0.25
Certain objects disappear from the theater and its crew. Gertie suggests the theater was haunted by a ghost. The club starts investigating and finds itself still at school at night, when principal Gregg Gibbins, disfavoring the Drama Club's existence, practices a singing performance in front of an empty auditorium wearing and using all missing items. Challenging him on his actions, Mr. Gibbins explains he once was a member of the school's drama club, but holds a grudge against it for casting him merely as a non-speaking toad. Special guest star: John Milhiser Guest stars: Neska Rose as Gertie, Reyn Doi as Kurtis, Marcus Folmar as Coach Cobbler, Ithmar Enriquez as Principal Gibbins, Reece Caddell as Simone, Lex Lumpkin as Tanner, Betsy Sodaro as Mrs. Todd
9	"Stress Rehearsal"	Matt Sohn	Ian McLees & Richard Carl	May 22, 2021	109	0.23
The day before opening night it is dress rehearsal and all kinds of troubles arise, so much so that Darcy is concerned that Mack might experience a "Mackattack", a desperate fit of rage preceded by a series of distinct stages of deterioration. Meanwhile, Bianca and Oliver seem to get along, but neither of them wants to admit their newly found goodwill. The eighth attempt of having an uninterrupted rehearsal succeeds. Bench, still not understanding the purpose of a show without audience, announces he will attend an important football match tomorrow night, ultimately causing a "Mackattack" in Mack. Special guest star: John Milhiser Guest stars: Neska Rose as Gertie, Reyn Doi as Kurtis, Pilot Bunch as Colin
10	"The Show Might Go On"	Matt Sohn	Monica Sherer & Madeline Whitby	May 22, 2021	110	0.15
It is opening night of Minnesota – the musical. Principal Gibbins is attending the show with the intention of undermining the Club's existence after a presumptuous terrible performance. Bench's football team has made the playoffs and Coach Cobbler needs all his players, but Mack and her Drama Club need Bench to attend the show to ensure the club's survival. In the first act Darcy fills in for Bench, while off-stage the students try to get a hand of him. During halftime, Bench finds his costume's mask in his locker and decides to join the theater crew who has made it till intermission. His teammates tag along and spontaneously join him on stage, and spectators from the match flock the auditorium. Everyone having a blast, Gibbens can no longer justify dismantling the club. Special guest star: John Milhiser Guest stars: Neska Rose as Gertie, Reyn Doi as Kurtis, Pilot Bunch as Colin, Marcus Folmar as Coach Cobbler, Ithmar Enriquez as Principal Gibbins, Lex Lumpkin as Tanner

== Ratings ==
Viewership and ratings per season of Drama Club
Season	Episodes	First aired		Last aired		Avg. viewers (millions)
Season	Episodes	Date	Viewers (millions)	Date	Viewers (millions)	Avg. viewers (millions)
1	10	March 20, 2021	0.38	May 22, 2021	0.15	0.27
