= Disney Speedstorm =

2023 kart racing video game

- Key Steam library artwork showing (from left-to-right) Sulley, Mickey Mouse (background), and Buzz Lightyear racing in Andy's Room
- Developer: Gameloft Barcelona
- Publisher: Gameloft
- Producers: Yura Liapin; Josh Abrams; Rodolfo Nunez
- Composers: Vincent Labelle; Nicholas Dubé; Francis Collard; Martin Courcy
- Engine: Jet Engine
- Platforms: Nintendo Switch; PlayStation 4; PlayStation 5; Windows; Xbox One; Xbox Series X/S; Android; iOS; Nintendo Switch 2
- Release: Nintendo Switch, PlayStation 4, PlayStation 5, Windows, Xbox One, Xbox Series X/S; 28 September 2023 (Note: The game was released in early access on 18 April 2023.); Android, iOS; 11 July 2024 (Note: Mobile version soft-launched in select regions on 1 August 2023); Nintendo Switch 2; 15 July 2026
- Genre: Kart racing
- Modes: Single-player, multiplayer

Disney Speedstorm is a free-to-play kart racing game developed by Gameloft Barcelona and published by Gameloft. It features various Disney and Pixar characters racing vehicles on tracks themed after the worlds of their films and franchises. The game was released in a pay-for early access on 18 April 2023, for Nintendo Switch, PlayStation 4, PlayStation 5, Windows, Xbox One, and Xbox Series X/S, with a soft launch on Android and iOS on 1 August 2023. The console and computer versions left early access on 28 September 2023, while the mobile version officially launched on 11 July 2024. The Switch release received Nintendo Switch 2-exclusive enhancements on 2 July 2025.

== Gameplay ==
Disney Speedstorm is a free-to-play kart racing game with a roster composed of characters from various Disney properties, such as the Mickey and Friends, Pirates of the Caribbean, Monsters, Inc., Toy Story and Beauty and the Beast franchises, among others, reimagined as race car drivers (referred to in-game as "Racers") in an in-universe arcade game also called Disney Speedstorm.

The gameplay is similar to Mario Kart. Racers can drift to improve their cornering and charge their nitro boost, which can only be used when the boost meter full. Racers also get a small drift boost from long drifts (indicated by their tires glowing blue), which also gives them an extra boost charge. Racers can sideswipe other Racers to knock them aside, jump to reach higher grounds or dodge obstacles, perform aerial stunts off designated jumps for a small speed boost upon landing, and grind on designated blue rails to also gain nitro boost.

Racers can also pick up various power-ups, called "skills", by driving through sprites with the image of Arbee, the game's emotive AI mascot, on them. These skills include offensive weapons that stun Racers, shields that protect Racers from stuns, cloaks that make Racers intangible and invisible, nitro boost charges, rushes that provide sudden bursts of speed, and hacks that flip a Racer's screen, potentially confusing them. Skills can also be "charged" to cause different effects; for example, a charged shield allows a Racer to stun another Racer who drives into them, at the cost of not being protected from being stunned unless a normal shield, a cloak, or an invulnerability effect is already in effect. Offensive skills and hacks can also be used backwards behind Racers. The availability of the various skills depends on the Racer (except in "Single Skill" races, mentioned below); for example, some Racers can receive and use shields while others can receive and use cloaks. Finally, each Racer has a unique skill that provide benefits to only that Racer, with each unique skill having normal and charged variants.

Each Racer has a range of stats that affect their performance, including top speed, acceleration, handling, boost, and combat. The stats can be upgraded by levelling up Racers, which during the game's first six seasons of content updates, required spending various "upgrade parts" collected from single-player event races and PvP multiplayer, which were later replaced with a single currency called "upgrade coins" from the seventh season onwards. However, Racer upgrade levels are capped to certain levels depending on their star levels, which require collecting "Racer shards". Further stat boosts and other enhancements are provided by attaching "Crew Members" to a Racer, which feature images of various minor Disney characters on them. The Crew Members can only be applied to Racers of the same affiliated collections (franchises) as them, such as the Orange Bird serving as a Crew Member for Figment; with "Epic" rarity Crew Members being applicable to only one Racer.

=== Game modes ===
The game includes various different single-player and multiplayer modes. Single-player modes include "Starter Circuit", a series of events that effectively serves as the game's "tutorial", limited events, which offer rewards for completing specific objectives or for getting a fast time on a leaderboard compared with other players online, "Season Tour", a limited-time campaign mode that changes each new content season, and "Tournaments", in which players race as a single Racer from either the Mickey and Friends franchise or a franchise that was featured in a previous season for a series of four races to earn points. Multiplayer includes ranked multiplayer, where players race to earn points to unlock tiers of rewards for each of their unlocked Racers (as well as for the player overall as of the game's eighth season), regulated multiplayer, a separate ranked multiplayer (with its own set of rewards that change weekly) that puts all Racers at the same performance levels, "Private Track", which allows players to set up their own custom races online with friends or invited players, and "Local Freeplay", the game's only offline mode, which features custom races for one to four players (one or two players on older consoles) in split-screen multiplayer. Ranked multiplayer can either be played either solo (up to eight Racers racing against one another) or in a team in a three-on-three race.

The races themselves are available in different types that feature different gimmicks: "Classic" is a traditional race; "Single Skill" forces all Racers to use the same offensive skill; "Floating Objects" have speed boosts and skill items floating above the ground, thus forcing Racers to jump to reach them; "Fog Challenge" covers the track in a dense fog—limiting visibility—and removes the minimap from the player's heads-up display; and "Last One Standing" is an elimination race where after a short (and declining) amount of time passes, the last place Racer either loses a "shield drone" and is teleported ahead on the track to try to avoid falling back to last or is eliminated if they have no more drones remaining. In the season two update in June 2023, the game added two new race types called "Color Match" and "Follow the Leader"; the former type forces players to pick up power-up items corresponding to one of two colors—green and purple—each of them is assigned to as indicated by the HUD and an underglow effect beneath their vehicle, switching between colors during the race, while the latter adds a long slipstream trail behind the race leader that provides a speed boost to the racers following the trail.

=== Characters and environments ===
As of February 2026, the game has a total of 136 (Note: This number is kept up to date by this script. It does not count the non-playable Arbee or any upcoming Racers that are not yet playable.) "Racers" (playable characters) from 34 Disney media franchises, referred to in-game as "collections". Each racer is assigned one of four Classes—Speedster, Trickster, Brawler, or Defender—which defines their playstyle. Many franchises also have an affiliated track environment, each featuring multiple track layouts, with Mickey Mouse & Friends having two (one based on modern Mickey Mouse media and one based on black-and-white shorts such as Steamboat Willie), while Disney Speedstorm itself has two original environments, "Arbee's Arena" and "Arbee's Short Circuit". Additionally, one environment, the Pirates of the Caribbean-inspired "A Pirate's Life", received an expansion via an update for the game's ninth season, adding new areas of the map and new track layouts.

The game also features a wide voice cast, most of whom reprise their respective characters from their original works. From Season 7 to Season 10, however, only selected new Racers received voice lines, with some unvoiced racers (specifically Calhoun, Fear, Sally, Mr. Incredible, Baymax, and Dr. Finkelstein) getting voice lines later on. Currently, six racers are unvoiced in-game (Fix-It Felix, King Candy, Anger, Disgust, Ennui, and Tia Dalma). However, since Season 11, all new Racers (excluding Rinzler, Yokai, and Tinker Bell, who do not speak in their original media) would receive voice lines at release.

Starting in Season 21, mid-season racers would be replaced in favor of Super Karts, a special type of vehicle that grants bonuses and skills to select racers.

- ‡ – Upcoming racer/franchise/map
- § – Non-playable character

Overview of characters and maps in Disney Speedstorm
Franchise	Environment	Character	Racer Class	Release date	Release season
101 Dalmatians	None	Cruella De Vil	Speedster	23 August 2024	Season 9: Looking for Trouble (Mid Season)
Aladdin	Agrabah	Aladdin	Trickster	28 September 2023	Season 4: The Cave of Wonders
Aladdin	Agrabah	Genie	Defender	28 September 2023	Season 4: The Cave of Wonders
Aladdin	Agrabah	Jafar	Brawler	28 September 2023	Season 4: The Cave of Wonders
Aladdin	Agrabah	Jasmine	Speedster	28 September 2023	Season 4: The Cave of Wonders
Alice in Wonderland	A World of My Own	Alice	Speedster	28 August 2025	Season 15: Time for Tea
Alice in Wonderland	A World of My Own	Mad Hatter	Trickster	28 August 2025	Season 15: Time for Tea
Alice in Wonderland	A World of My Own	Queen of Hearts	Brawler	28 August 2025	Season 15: Time for Tea
Beauty and the Beast	The Castle	Beast	Brawler	8 June 2022	Season 0 (Beta): Honor and Glory
Beauty and the Beast	The Castle	Belle	Speedster	8 June 2022	Season 0 (Beta): Honor and Glory
Beauty and the Beast	The Castle	Gaston	Brawler	13 October 2023	Season 4: The Cave of Wonders (Mid Season)
Big Hero 6	Welcome to San Fransokyo!	Baymax	Brawler	8 May 2025	Season 13: Microbot Mayhem
Big Hero 6	Welcome to San Fransokyo!	Hiro	Trickster	8 May 2025	Season 13: Microbot Mayhem
Big Hero 6	Welcome to San Fransokyo!	Honey Lemon	Trickster	8 May 2025	Season 13: Microbot Mayhem
Big Hero 6	Welcome to San Fransokyo!	Go Go Tomago	Speedster	1 April 2026	Season 18: Piston Cup (Mid Season)
Big Hero 6	Welcome to San Fransokyo!	Yokai	Defender	9 April 2026	Season 19: Villanous Ever After
Brave	None	Merida	Brawler	16 July 2026	Season 20: Second Star Magic (Mid Season)
Cars	Radiator Springs	Cruz Ramirez	Speedster	12 February 2026	Season 18: Piston Cup
Cars	Radiator Springs	Lightning McQueen	Speedster	12 February 2026	Season 18: Piston Cup
Cars	Radiator Springs	Tow Mater	Defender	12 February 2026	Season 18: Piston Cup
Chip 'n Dale: Rescue Rangers	None	Chip	Trickster	18 July 2025	Season 14: No Toy Gets Left Behind! (Mid Season)
Chip 'n Dale: Rescue Rangers	None	Dale	Defender	14 August 2025	Season 14: No Toy Gets Left Behind! (Mid Season)
Cinderella	None	Cinderella	Speedster	12 June 2025	Season 13: Microbot Mayhem (Mid Season)
Coco	Road to Remembrance	Ernesto de la Cruz	Brawler	24 September 2026	Season 22: Bridge of Marigolds
Coco	Road to Remembrance	Héctor	Trickster	24 September 2026	Season 22: Bridge of Marigolds
Coco	Road to Remembrance	Miguel	Speedster	24 September 2026	Season 22: Bridge of Marigolds
Disney Parks (Note: Currently depicted in-game as Walt Disney World)	None	Figment	Trickster	28 April 2023	Season 1: Unafraid (Mid Season)
Disney Speedstorm	Arbee's Arena	Arbee§ (Note: Arbee only appears as a non-playable AI-controlled Racer within the boss challenges in the game's Season Tour mode, taking on the role of a Racer from the Tour's focused franchise.)		8 June 2022	Season 0 (Beta): Honor and Glory
Disney Speedstorm	Arbee's Short Circuit	Arbee§		13 August 2024	Season 9: Looking for Trouble
The Emperor's New Groove	None	Kuzco	Speedster	8 January 2026	Season 17: Partners in Paw (Mid Season)
The Emperor's New Groove	None	Yzma	Trickster	29 January 2026	Season 17: Partners in Paw (Mid Season)
Encanto	None	Isabela	Speedster	30 July 2026	Season 21: Madrigal Miracle
Encanto	None	Luisa	Brawler	30 July 2026	Season 21: Madrigal Miracle
Encanto	None	Mirabel	Defender	30 July 2026	Season 21: Madrigal Miracle
Frozen	Arendelle	Anna	Trickster	30 November 2023	Season 5: Let It Go
Frozen	Arendelle	Elsa	Defender	30 November 2023	Season 5: Let It Go
Frozen	Arendelle	Hans	Brawler	30 November 2023	Season 5: Let It Go
Frozen	Arendelle	Kristoff	Defender	30 November 2023	Season 5: Let It Go
Frozen	Arendelle	Olaf	Speedster	30 November 2023	Season 5: Let It Go
Hercules	Mount Olympus	Hercules	Brawler	8 June 2022	Season 0 (Beta): Honor and Glory
Hercules	Mount Olympus	Meg	Trickster	8 June 2022	Season 0 (Beta): Honor and Glory
Hercules	Mount Olympus	Hades	Trickster	27 October 2023	Season 4: The Cave of Wonders (Mid Season)
Hoppers	None	Mabel	Defender	6 March 2026	Season 18: Piston Cup (Mid Season)
The Incredibles	The Incredible Showdown	Dash	Speedster	12 December 2024	Season 11: Save the World
The Incredibles	The Incredible Showdown	Frozone	Defender	12 December 2024	Season 11: Save the World
The Incredibles	The Incredible Showdown	Mr. Incredible	Brawler	12 December 2024	Season 11: Save the World
The Incredibles	The Incredible Showdown	Mrs. Incredible	Trickster	12 December 2024	Season 11: Save the World
The Incredibles	The Incredible Showdown	Violet	Defender	12 December 2024	Season 11: Save the World
The Incredibles	The Incredible Showdown	Syndrome	Trickster	23 April 2026	Season 19: Villanous Ever After (Mid Season)
Inside Out	Riley's Mind	Anger	Brawler	13 June 2024	Season 8: Journey of Emotions
Inside Out	Riley's Mind	Disgust	Trickster	13 June 2024	Season 8: Journey of Emotions
Inside Out	Riley's Mind	Fear	Defender	13 June 2024	Season 8: Journey of Emotions
Inside Out	Riley's Mind	Joy	Speedster	13 June 2024	Season 8: Journey of Emotions
Inside Out	Riley's Mind	Sadness	Defender	13 June 2024	Season 8: Journey of Emotions
Inside Out	Riley's Mind	Anxiety	Speedster	19 July 2024	Season 8: Journey of Emotions (Mid Season)
Inside Out	Riley's Mind	Ennui	Trickster	1 August 2024	Season 8: Journey of Emotions (Mid Season)
The Jungle Book	Jungle Ruins	Baloo	Defender	8 June 2022	Season 0 (Beta): Honor and Glory
The Jungle Book	Jungle Ruins	Mowgli	Speedster	8 June 2022	Season 0 (Beta): Honor and Glory
Lilo & Stitch	Kauaʻi	Angel	Trickster	31 July 2023	Season 3: ʻOhana
Lilo & Stitch	Kauaʻi	Captain Gantu	Brawler	31 July 2023	Season 3: ʻOhana
Lilo & Stitch	Kauaʻi	Jumba	Defender	31 July 2023	Season 3: ʻOhana
Lilo & Stitch	Kauaʻi	Lilo	Speedster	31 July 2023	Season 3: ʻOhana
Lilo & Stitch	Kauaʻi	Stitch	Speedster	31 July 2023	Season 3: ʻOhana
The Little Mermaid	Atlantica	Ariel	Defender	8 February 2024	Season 6: Under the Sea
The Little Mermaid	Atlantica	Prince Eric	Speedster	8 February 2024	Season 6: Under the Sea
The Little Mermaid	Atlantica	King Triton	Brawler	8 February 2024	Season 6: Under the Sea
The Little Mermaid	Atlantica	Ursula	Trickster	8 February 2024	Season 6: Under the Sea
Mickey Mouse & Friends	Toon Village The Silver Screen	Donald Duck	Brawler	8 June 2022	Season 0 (Beta): Honor and Glory
Mickey Mouse & Friends	Toon Village The Silver Screen	Mickey Mouse	Speedster	8 June 2022	Season 0 (Beta): Honor and Glory
Mickey Mouse & Friends	Toon Village The Silver Screen	Goofy	Defender	18 April 2023	Season 1: Unafraid
Mickey Mouse & Friends	Toon Village The Silver Screen	Steamboat Mickey	Defender	30 June 2023	Season 2: To Infinity and Beyond (Mid Season)
Mickey Mouse & Friends	Toon Village The Silver Screen	Steamboat Pete	Brawler	30 June 2023	Season 2: To Infinity and Beyond (Mid Season)
Mickey Mouse & Friends	Toon Village The Silver Screen	Daisy Duck	Trickster	21 August 2023	Season 3: ʻOhana (Mid Season)
Mickey Mouse & Friends	Toon Village The Silver Screen	Minnie Mouse	Brawler	21 August 2023	Season 3: ʻOhana (Mid Season)
Mickey Mouse & Friends	Toon Village The Silver Screen	Scrooge McDuck	Defender	9 October 2025	Season 15: Time for Tea (Mid Season)
Mickey Mouse & Friends	Toon Village The Silver Screen	Pete	Brawler	21 May 2026	Season 19: Villanous Ever After (Mid Season)
Moana	None	Maui	Trickster	18 December 2024	Season 11: Save the World (Mid Season)
Moana	None	Moana	Speedster	17 January 2025	Season 11: Save the World (Mid Season)
Monsters, Inc.	The Scare Floor	Celia Mae	Defender	18 April 2023	Season 1: Unafraid
Monsters, Inc.	The Scare Floor	Mike Wazowski	Speedster	18 April 2023	Season 1: Unafraid
Monsters, Inc.	The Scare Floor	Randall	Trickster	18 April 2023	Season 1: Unafraid
Monsters, Inc.	The Scare Floor	Sulley	Brawler	18 April 2023	Season 1: Unafraid
Mulan	The Great Wall	Mulan	Trickster	8 June 2022	Season 0 (Beta): Honor and Glory
Mulan	The Great Wall	Shang	Defender	8 June 2022	Season 0 (Beta): Honor and Glory
Mulan	The Great Wall	Shan Yu	Brawler	9 April 2026	Season 19: Villanous Ever After
The Muppets	None	Kermit the Frog	Speedster	24 May 2024	Season 7: Sugar Rush (Mid Season)
The Muppets	None	Miss Piggy	Brawler	18 October 2024	Season 10: Trick or Treat (Mid Season)
The Muppets	None	Fozzie Bear	Trickster	11 September 2025	Season 15: Time for Tea (Mid Season)
The Nightmare Before Christmas	The Nightmare Festival	Dr. Finkelstein	Trickster	10 October 2024	Season 10: Trick or Treat
The Nightmare Before Christmas	The Nightmare Festival	Jack Skellington	Speedster	10 October 2024	Season 10: Trick or Treat
The Nightmare Before Christmas	The Nightmare Festival	Oogie Boogie	Brawler	10 October 2024	Season 10: Trick or Treat
The Nightmare Before Christmas	The Nightmare Festival	Sally	Defender	10 October 2024	Season 10: Trick or Treat
Oswald the Lucky Rabbit	None	Oswald	Trickster	8 December 2023	Season 5: Let It Go (Mid Season)
Oswald the Lucky Rabbit	None	Ortensia	Speedster	29 December 2023	Season 5: Let It Go (Mid Season)
Peter Pan	Neverland	Captain Hook	Brawler	4 June 2026	Season 20: Second Star Magic
Peter Pan	Neverland	Peter Pan	Defender	4 June 2026	Season 20: Second Star Magic
Peter Pan	Neverland	Tinker Bell	Speedster	4 June 2026	Season 20: Second Star Magic
Pirates of the Caribbean	A Pirate's Life	Elizabeth Swann	Defender	8 June 2022	Season 0 (Beta): Honor and Glory
Pirates of the Caribbean	A Pirate's Life	Jack Sparrow	Trickster	8 June 2022	Season 0 (Beta): Honor and Glory
Pirates of the Caribbean	A Pirate's Life	Davy Jones	Defender	13 August 2024	Season 9: Looking for Trouble
Pirates of the Caribbean	A Pirate's Life	Hector Barbossa	Brawler	13 August 2024	Season 9: Looking for Trouble
Pirates of the Caribbean	A Pirate's Life	Tia Dalma	Trickster	13 August 2024	Season 9: Looking for Trouble
Pirates of the Caribbean	A Pirate's Life	Will Turner	Speedster	13 August 2024	Season 9: Looking for Trouble
The Princess and the Frog	None	Tiana	Defender	19 November 2026	Season 23: Recipe for a Dream
The Princess and the Frog	None	Louis	Brawler	19 November 2026	Season 23: Recipe for a Dream
Robin Hood	None	Robin Hood	Trickster	17 December 2026	Season 23: Recipe for a Dream (Mid Season)
Sleeping Beauty	None	Maleficent	Trickster	19 September 2024	Season 9: Looking for Trouble (Mid Season)
Sleeping Beauty	None	Aurora	Defender	22 May 2025	Season 13: Microbot Mayhem (Mid Season)
Snow White and the Seven Dwarfs	None	Snow White	Defender	21 March 2025	Season 12: On the Grid (Mid Season)
Snow White and the Seven Dwarfs	None	The Evil Queen	Trickster	10 April 2025	Season 12: On the Grid (Mid Season)
Tangled	None	Rapunzel	Defender	14 November 2024	Season 10: Trick or Treat (Mid Season)
Tangled	None	Mother Gothel	Trickster	9 April 2026	Season 19: Villanous Ever After
Toy Story	Andy's Room	Bo Peep	Trickster	13 June 2023	Season 2: To Infinity and Beyond
Toy Story	Andy's Room	Buzz Lightyear	Defender	13 June 2023	Season 2: To Infinity and Beyond
Toy Story	Andy's Room	Jessie	Brawler	13 June 2023	Season 2: To Infinity and Beyond
Toy Story	Andy's Room	Woody	Speedster	13 June 2023	Season 2: To Infinity and Beyond
Toy Story	Andy's Room	Emperor Zurg	Brawler	3 July 2025	Season 14: No Toy Gets Left Behind!
Toy Story	Andy's Room	Forky	Defender	3 July 2025	Season 14: No Toy Gets Left Behind!
Toy Story	Andy's Room	Lotso	Trickster	3 July 2025	Season 14: No Toy Gets Left Behind!
Toy Story	Andy's Room	Rex	Trickster	18 June 2026	Season 20: Second Star Magic (Mid Season)
Tron	The Portal	Quorra	Defender	6 March 2025	Season 12: On the Grid
Tron	The Portal	Rinzler	Brawler	6 March 2025	Season 12: On the Grid
Tron	The Portal	Sam Flynn	Speedster	6 March 2025	Season 12: On the Grid
Tron	The Portal	Zuse	Trickster	6 March 2025	Season 12: On the Grid
Up	None	Carl Fredricksen	Brawler	6 November 2025	Season 16: Rumbly Tumbly Adventure (Mid Season)
Up	None	Russell	Brawler	4 December 2025	Season 16: Rumbly Tumbly Adventure (Mid Season)
WALL-E	None	WALL-E	Speedster	22 December 2023	Season 5: Let It Go (Mid Season)
WALL-E	None	EVE	Defender	1 March 2024	Season 6: Under the Sea (Mid Season)
Winnie the Pooh	None	Eeyore	Speedster	23 October 2025	Season 16: Rumbly Tumbly Adventure
Winnie the Pooh	None	Tigger	Trickster	23 October 2025	Season 16: Rumbly Tumbly Adventure
Winnie the Pooh	None	Winnie the Pooh	Defender	23 October 2025	Season 16: Rumbly Tumbly Adventure
Wreck-It Ralph	Candy Kingdom	Fix-It Felix	Defender	18 April 2024	Season 7: Sugar Rush
Wreck-It Ralph	Candy Kingdom	King Candy	Trickster	18 April 2024	Season 7: Sugar Rush
Wreck-It Ralph	Candy Kingdom	Ralph	Brawler	18 April 2024	Season 7: Sugar Rush
Wreck-It Ralph	Candy Kingdom	Sergeant Calhoun	Brawler	18 April 2024	Season 7: Sugar Rush
Wreck-It Ralph	Candy Kingdom	Vanellope	Speedster	18 April 2024	Season 7: Sugar Rush
Zootopia	Zootropolis	Flash	Speedster	18 December 2025	Season 17: Partners in Paw
Zootopia	Zootropolis	Judy Hopps	Defender	18 December 2025	Season 17: Partners in Paw
Zootopia	Zootropolis	Nick Wilde	Brawler	18 December 2025	Season 17: Partners in Paw

== Soundtrack ==
The music is done by a team of four musicians (Vincent Labelle, Nicholas Dubé, Francis Collard and Martin Courcy) remixing Disney and Pixar tunes.

== Development and release ==
Disney Speedstorm is developed by Gameloft Barcelona, the developers of the Asphalt games 8: Airborne and Legends, and was designed to be a high-speed racing game based on Disney's franchises and characters. It was made using the same game engine Asphalt Legends used, Gameloft's in-house Jet Engine. Alexandru "Sasha" Adam, VP and studio manager, Gameloft Barcelona explained, "The gameplay mechanics, the racer abilities and the location design were all tailored to serve our vision of a fast and gripping competitive experience."

Announced in March 2023, the game was released in early access for Nintendo Switch, PlayStation 4, PlayStation 5, Windows, Xbox One and Xbox Series X/S on 18 April 2023. A trailer for the game was released on 9 September 2022 at the D23 Expo.

On 30 June 2023, Gameloft announced that the game would leave early access, entering its intended free-to-play period, on 28 September 2023, following the conclusion of the game's third season.

On 1 August 2023, Gameloft soft launched the game on iOS and Android alongside the game's third season update. The soft launch began in Spain and Romania, with plans to expand the soft launch to the Philippines, Brazil, Vietnam, Mexico, Australia, Taiwan, Denmark, Norway, Sweden, Austria, and Ireland over time. After an announcement on 6 June 2024, the mobile version was fully released on 11 July 2024.

On 2 July 2025, the game's fourteenth season update, Gameloft added Nintendo Switch 2 enhancements for the Nintendo Switch release. The enhancements include a frame rate increase from the first Switch's 30 frames per second to 60 frames per second (matching the versions on non-Nintendo consoles), support for 1080p when in handheld mode and up to 1440p when docked, and improved shadows, anti-aliasing, and shader quality.

=== Downloadable content ===
On 27 March 2023, Gameloft released a trailer announcing three "Founder's Packs" that would be available during the game's early access period. The Founder's Packs, which were required for early access, all contained Mickey Mouse and Donald Duck as unlocked racers (with the Deluxe Founder's Pack adding Mulan and the Ultimate Founder's Pack adding her, Hercules, and Jack Sparrow), plus a choice to immediately unlock Baloo, Belle, Beast, Elizabeth Swann, Li Shang, or Mowgli; Tokens (the game's premium currency; 4,000 Tokens for Standard, 7,000 for Deluxe, and 12,000 for Ultimate), two (or three for Ultimate) Golden Pass Credits (unlocking the Golden Pass, the game's battle pass system), exclusive racing suits and kart liveries for each of the immediately unlocked racers (depending on the player's chosen tier), exclusive Donald Duck kart wheels and wing (Ultimate only), and an exclusive player avatar and profile motto.

As a free-to-play title, all content in the game (apart from the Founder's Pack exclusives) is added via seasonal content updates, which are added approximately every two months. Initially, each season added four or five new racers from a newly added franchise of focus for that season (with the exception of Season 19, which has one villain from each franchise; specifically Shan Yu, Yokai, Mother Gothel and the midseason racers, Syndrome and Pete) plus a new map based on that franchise. However, starting with the Big Hero 6-themed 13th season, each season now adds three new racers from one franchise. Additionally, new "bonus" racers mostly not affiliated with the season's focused-on franchise are made available mid-season (with the exception of the Inside Out-themed Season 8, Journey of Emotions, which added Anxiety and Ennui from Inside Out 2), as well as new crew members and customization options for the racers, however, midseason racers were phased out during the Encanto-themed 21st season in favour of Super Karts that were introduced in the Peter Pan-themed 20th season.

== Reception ==
Reception

Aggregate scores
Aggregator	Score
Metacritic	NS: 66/100; PS5: 74/100; XSX/S: 72/100
OpenCritic	60% recommend

Review scores
Publication	Score
IGN	5/10
Nintendo Life	6/10
Push Square	7/10

Edit on Wikidata

Disney Speedstorm received "mixed or average" reviews, according to review aggregator Metacritic. 60% of critics recommended the game on review aggregator OpenCritic.

John Hansen of Push Square said while they had reservations with the free-to-play monetization, they thought the game had a lot of potential and summarised by saying "if you're a Disney fan, it's a good way to mash together some of your favorite old movies and battle it out on the racetrack."

Chris Scullion for Nintendo Life praised the gameplay but criticized the performance issues of the Switch version and felt that the game's monetization would deter some players. Luke Reilly of IGN found the game had too few tracks and was overly repetitive for its then-asking price, while criticizing its excessive monetization scheme.

=== Monetization changes ===
On 9 April 2024, Gameloft announced in a community news update changes to the game's Golden Passes for the game's then-upcoming seventh season. The company announced that, among other changes, each season would be split into two parts lasting approximately one month each, with each part having its own Golden Pass, and Tokens—which can be either purchased as microtransactions or earned through ranked multiplayer—can no longer be used to purchase Golden Passes, effectively making Golden Passes only available via a direct purchase.

The monetization changes were met with strong backlash from players. Players criticized the changes as being "predatory" and labeled Gameloft as "thieves". Paul McNally of ReadWrite pointed out that the announcement comes "at a time when the Helldivers 2 Warbond battle pass is being praised for being so generous with its in-game currency allowing players easy access to its premium tiers for free". Players review bombed the game on Steam after the announcement, with Destructoid's Michael Beckwith pointing out that the game's Steam version had been losing active players since November 2023 according to Steam Charts. Some players requested refunds for their past purchases, others threatened to boycott the game by either refusing to make any further purchases or stop playing Speedstorm altogether, and at least one Redditor on the Speedstorm subreddit has proposed filing a class action lawsuit.

On 17 April 2024, in response to the backlash, Gameloft announced that players could continue to purchase Golden Pass Credits with Tokens until 16 May 2024, allowing players to buy future Golden Passes using Credits bought with Tokens up to that date, but otherwise would continue with plans to restrict Golden Pass purchases to either direct payments or Golden Pass Credits afterward.

On 1 August 2024, Gameloft released a limited time event to unlock Ennui from Inside Out 2. However, only five shards could be obtained from the event (ten is required to unlock her), requiring players to purchase and use Tokens to purchase her designated loot box, which had a rate of 15% to grant Ennui racer shards. This mandatory loot box purchase to unlock a single Racer caused another strong backlash from players.

=== Player count and revenue ===
In September 2023, Disney Speedstorm was the 10th most downloaded free-to-play game on PlayStation 4 and PlayStation 5 in the United States and Canada, and was the 7th in Europe. In October, the game rose to 4th place in the United States and Canada, while it placed 2nd in Europe. The game remained among the top titles in November, placing 7th in Europe. In the fourth quarter of 2023, Disney Speedstorm on iOS in Europe had weekly revenue peaking at approximately $2,000 in mid-December. Downloads reached around 25,800 in late October, while active users peaked at about 32,200 during the same period.

By June 2024, Disney Speedstorm had surpassed one million mobile pre-registrations. In the fourth quarter of 2024, the game on iOS generated weekly revenue of around $3,500. Downloads reached 14,800 in mid-October, and active users increased to over 56,000 by the end of December. Vivendi later said Disney Speedstorm, alongside Disney Dreamlight Valley, Asphalt Legends Unite, Disney Magic Kingdoms, and March of Empires, represented altogether 57% of Gameloft's total revenues, and ranked as one of their five best sellers in 2024.

In the first quarter of 2025, Disney Speedstorm on Android had weekly revenue ranging from approximately $5,000 to $7,000. Downloads peaked at around 2,400, and active users remained below 7,000 throughout the quarter. In the first half of 2025, Disney Speedstorm, together with Disney Dreamlight Valley, Asphalt Legends Unite, Disney Magic Kingdoms, and March of Empires, was among Gameloft's top-performing titles. Together, the games accounted for 57% of the company's total revenue, placing them among its top five best-sellers.

=== Awards ===
In 2023, Disney Speedstorm was nominated at the Pocket Tactics Awards in the Mobile Game of the Year category. In 2024, the game was nominated at the App Store Awards in the iPad Game of the Year category. In 2025, it won the award for best multiplatform game from the Google Play Awards.
