= Dream Productions =

Pixar animated series

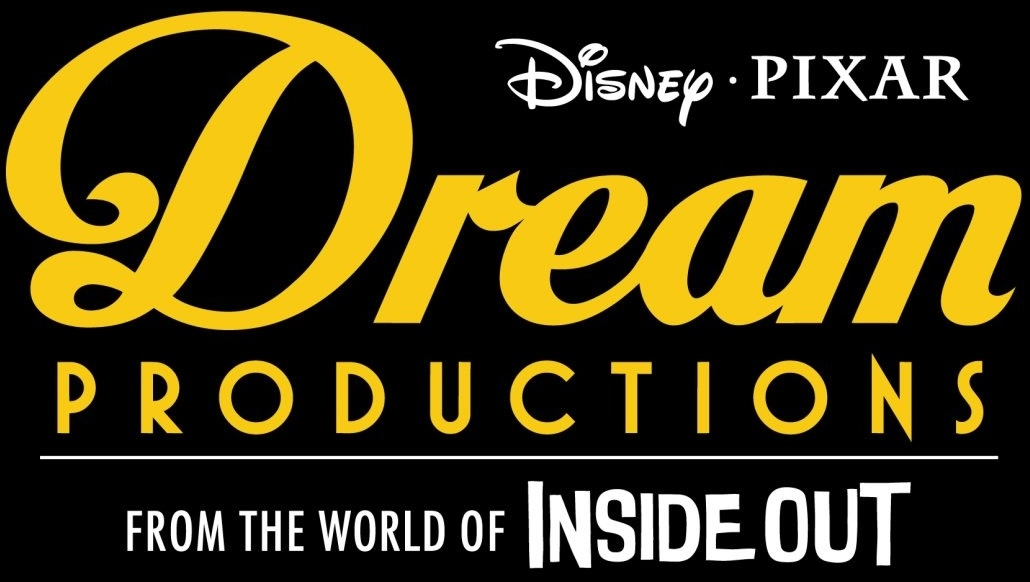
- Genre: Comedy; Mockumentary
- Created by: Mike Jones
- Showrunner: Mike Jones
- Written by: Mike Jones
- Voices of: Paula Pell; Richard Ayoade; Kensington Tallman; Maya Rudolph; Ally Maki
- Music by: Nami Melumad
- Country of origin: United States
- Original language: English
- No. of episodes: 4

Production
- Executive producers: Mike Jones; Jaclyn Simon; Pete Docter; Jonas Rivera; Dan Scanlon
- Producers: Jaclyn Simon; Sabine Koch O'Sullivan
- Cinematography: Arjun Rihan; Jesse Hollander
- Editors: Katie Schaefer Bishop; Serena Warner; Tim Fox
- Running time: 27–31 minutes
- Production company: Pixar Animation Studios

Original release
- Network: Disney+
- Release: December 11, 2024

Dream Productions is an American animated mockumentary comedy television miniseries produced by Pixar Animation Studios for the streaming service Disney+. Developed and created by Mike Jones, it is set between the events of Inside Out (2015) and Inside Out 2 (2024). The miniseries follows Paula Persimmon (Paula Pell), who teams with Xeni (Richard Ayoade) to create Riley's next big tween dream.

Jones, who served as showrunner, was announced to be creating a series based on Inside Out at Pixar in June 2023. The series was being produced concurrently with the sequel film Inside Out 2. Its title was unveiled in May 2024. Nami Melumad provided the score for all four episodes. The series runs approximately 82 minutes long in total.

Dream Productions premiered on Disney+ on December 11, 2024. It received generally positive reviews from critics. The series made its linear television debut on August 4, 2025, on Disney Channel, with Disney XD following a few weeks later on August 30.

== Voice cast ==
- Paula Pell as Paula Persimmon, a former acclaimed dream director and the current head of Dream Productions. The character was originally credited as simply "Dream Director" in Inside Out.
- Richard Ayoade as Kenny "Xeni" Dewberry, an overly confident daydream director, Jean's nephew, and Paula's new A.D.
- Kensington Tallman as Riley Andersen, a girl appearing in different moments from childhood to pre-teen in whose mind the emotions live
- Maya Rudolph as Jean Dewberry, the former head of Dream Productions, Xeni's aunt and Paula's boss
- Ally Maki as Janelle Johnson, Paula's former A.D. who dreams of making her very own dreams and becomes a successful director herself
- Amy Poehler as Joy, a yellow emotion who often takes the lead in Riley's emotional life and is in charge of giving her assurance in her everyday life and helping her enjoy it to the fullest
- Phyllis Smith as Sadness, a blue emotion who helps Riley process upsetting experiences and seek help from others when she needs it
- Liza Lapira as Disgust, a green emotion who uses Riley's likes and dislikes to discern whether something could poison her physically or socially
- Lewis Black as Anger, a red emotion who is in charge of fighting to keep things fair for Riley
- Tony Hale as Fear, a purple emotion responsible for protecting Riley from threats in the physical world
- Lauren Holt as "Teen Riley", a manifestation of Riley's teenage self that she drew when she was younger represented by a traditionally animated doodle on loose-leaf paper who works as a barista but later cast in a dream
- Quinn Minichino Eakins as Young Riley, Riley's younger self
- Kimberly Woods as Gigi, a director who creates scary nightmares for Riley
- Carlos Alazraqui as Marco, a director who creates sports (especially hockey) dreams for Riley
- Matthew Yang King as Sheng, a director who creates Riley's thrilling, action-packed dreams
- Diane Lane as Jill Andersen, Riley's mother
- Kyle MacLachlan as Bill Andersen, Riley's father
- Grace Lu as Grace, one of Riley's best friends
- Sumayyah Nuriddin-Green as Bree, also one of Riley's best friends
- Noah Bentley as C.B. ("Canadian Boyfriend", also known as "imaginary boyfriend" here and in the first film), the representation of Riley's ideal boyfriend
  - The imaginary boyfriend was previously voiced by Tony Maki in Inside Out.
- Maya Aoki Tuttle as Noriko, one of the production assistants in Paula's team

== Episodes ==
| No. | Title | Directed by | Original release date |
|---|---|---|---|
| 1 | "Part 1: The Dream Team" | Valerie LaPointe | December 11, 2024 |
Paula Persimmon is an admired dream director from Dream Productions in Riley's mind since the girl was two years old. When her assistant director, Janelle Johnson, tries to tell her that she is planning on striking out on her own, Paula is too excited and distracted on making a worthwhile dream for Riley. Paula decides to create one where Riley attends an upcoming school dance with Rainbow Unicorn as Mermaid Unicorn making an appearance, despite Janelle feeling that Riley is too mature for that. At a directors' meeting, the head of Dream Productions, Jean Dewberry, has Paula direct the opening night dream, and then promotes Janelle to be a new director, much to Paula's shock. That evening, as Riley falls asleep early, Paula's dream at first goes off great, but when Rainbow Unicorn comes out of a giant clamshell, it accidentally destroys the set.
| 2 | "Part 2: Out of Body" | Valerie LaPointe | December 11, 2024 |
Paula is assigned a new assistant, Jean's pretentious daydream director nephew, Xeni, who believes that Riley's dreams should be more mature. Paula insists on doing things her way through, which results in another bad dream starring Rainbow Unicorn, who then angrily quits on Paula. Xeni's unhelpfulness and mocking results in Paula discharging him. Meanwhile, Janelle creates her own hit dream, and Jean subtly warns Paula that she might be on the chopping block if she doesn't shape up soon.
| 3 | "Part 3: Romance!" | Austin Madison | December 11, 2024 |
Paula rehires Xeni, and thanks to his influence, the dream they film involves Riley taking a Canadian-based boyfriend ("C.B.") to the dance, and is a hit. Jean loves this idea and soon decides to give Paula and her crew the entire night to create a "Part 2" dream, which results in Paula once again taking over. Xeni, determined, soon creates another fake boyfriend to add in drama and increase the Feel-sen ratings. This results in Paula and Xeni repeatedly sabotaging each other, overcrowding the set with many fake boyfriends, and disrupting Riley's mind to the point where Riley begins sleepwalking, which causes the camera to start moving on its own. In this unconscious state, Riley nearly falls off the stairs while the camera almost falls off an edge. Jean, furious over the debacle, demotes Xeni to work at the local café after Paula shifts the blame to him. Jean puts Paula under pressure to create another mature dream, but if not, she would be demoted to brain farts.
| 4 | "Part 4: A Night to Remember" | Mike Jones | December 11, 2024 |
Because of the sleepwalking incident, Jean begins giving all of the directors locked scripts from the writers. Wanting to get revenge on Paula, Xeni writes a script designed to be a nightmare and slips it into Paula's folder. Paula reads the script and soon decides to quit, believing she doesn't know Riley at all. Conscience-stricken, Xeni finds Paula and confesses to his sabotage and that since Paula has resigned, his fake script has been reassigned to Janelle. When Paula tries to warn Janelle of this, Jean comes and actually loves the script. When Paula, Xeni, and Janelle become unwilling to direct, Jean fires them all and decides to do the dream herself. The trio manages to sneak back into Dream Productions, where Paula soon removes the camera's reality distortion filter (based on Xeni's suggestion) so that Riley can understand that it's all not real when the dream begins taking a toll on her, giving her a lucid dream. The dream is changed into a happy one, and Riley soon decides to go to the dance with her friends Bree and Grace. As a result of that, many things change: Anger demotes Jean to working at the café, Janelle gets her job back, Xeni becomes the new director, and most significantly, Paula becomes the new head of Dream Productions.

== Production ==
=== Development ===
On June 16, 2023, it was reported that an Inside Out television series was being developed by Pixar for Disney+; the series was reportedly being developed as part of an effort by Disney to increase Pixar's output. Mike Jones, who previously wrote Soul (2020) and Luca (2021) for the studio, was set to develop the series. The series was being developed simultaneously with a sequel to the original film, titled Inside Out 2 (2024). By May 2024, the series had been titled Dream Productions.

In August 2024, Jones revealed he would executively produce the series, as well as serve as director alongside Valerie LaPointe (associate executive producer of Inside Out 2) and Austin Madison, with Jaclyn Simon (characters and rendering manager of Inside Out) as producer, and Jones as showrunner. Paula Pell was also confirmed to reprise her role as Paula Persimmon from the first film to star as the main protagonist in the series. The series was produced under a smaller budget than most Pixar productions, which Jones compared to making an independent film within Pixar. The series was originally set to be seven episodes long, but the episode count was reduced to four due to budget cuts.

=== Writing ===
The series is set between the events of Inside Out and Inside Out 2. Executive producer and Inside Out director Pete Docter said the series would explore "the power of dreams and how they affect us in our waking life". Jones said the relationship between Paula and Riley was inspired by his relationship with his sons, and how he had to "find a different way of talking to them" as they grew up. The producers consulted with the group of nine teens Pixar assembled to consult for Inside Out 2 (dubbed "Riley's Crew") to provide feedback for the show; their feedback led the filmmakers to increase the Hollywood-esque aspect of the show after they reacted positively to it.

=== Animation ===
Bert Berry (shading art director of Inside Out) served as the production designer for the series. Assets from the first film were reused for Dream Productions, in addition to collaborating with the team for Inside Out 2, who shared new assets created for that film for the series as both productions shared a Perforce server as a cost-cutting measure; visual effects supervisor Bill Wise noted the assets sharing was required due to the series lacking the budget to create new assets. He also noted this allowed the series' team to reuse several character models from the film. Multiple teams, such as the assets and art teams, were also combined to streamline production and allow for the directors to review the material. The set design team, led by Josh Holtsclaw (graphics art director of Luca), traveled to multiple studio lots, including the 20th Century Studios and Walt Disney Studios backlots, to study them and draw inspiration for the design of the Dream Productions studio, while also incorporating elements from San Francisco.

=== Music ===
On September 24, 2024, Nami Melumad was revealed to be composing for the series. Melumad joined the series after being asked to present musical reels by Disney's music department, who hired her as composer after she presented said reels, in which she combined different music styles to fit the tone for the series. Jones also gave a few ideas for the series' score. For the dream sequences, Melumad made use of several types of music, including 80s rock music and children's music, in order to reflect how dreams were different every time, while the score for the series itself draws inspiration from "early 70s funk, rock, [and] jazz" due to its humorous tone, while also ultimately aiming for the music to make the setting feel like an actual Hollywood studio. A soundtrack featuring Melumad's score was released on December 20, 2024.

Dream Productions

Soundtrack album by Nami Melumad
- Released: December 20, 2024
- Genre: Soundtrack
- Length: 59:00
- Label: Walt Disney

| No. | Title | Length |
|---|---|---|
| 1. | "The Main Dream" | 0:31 |
| 2. | "Dream Productions" | 1:44 |
| 3. | "This Too Shall Paci" | 1:42 |
| 4. | "We All Dream for Ice Cream" | 0:38 |
| 5. | "The Warehouse of Dreams" | 0:58 |
| 6. | "I Dream of Jean" | 0:43 |
| 7. | "Little Cabin in the Valley" | 0:57 |
| 8. | "It's Mermaid Unicorn" | 1:58 |
| 9. | "Dancing Nightmare" | 0:56 |
| 10. | "That's a Wrap" | 2:27 |
| 11. | "The Morning After" | 0:51 |
| 12. | "To Hell in a Golf Cart" | 0:46 |
| 13. | "It's Vintage" | 0:41 |
| 14. | "Goth Complex" | 1:06 |
| 15. | "A Room with a Review" | 1:40 |
| 16. | "Out of Body" | 1:36 |
| 17. | "Chilly Jean Is Not My Mother" | 1:49 |
| 18. | "My Heart Is an Open Mic" | 1:42 |
| 19. | "What's Your Dance" | 1:06 |
| 20. | "Call It a Comeback" | 1:30 |
| 21. | "Riley or Die" | 1:10 |
| 22. | "An Accident Rating to Happen" | 0:43 |
| 23. | "All the World's a Stage Worker" | 1:14 |
| 24. | "Dream Date" | 1:28 |
| 25. | "Sleepwalk the Line" | 2:55 |
| 26. | "Demotion Sickness" | 2:50 |
| 27. | "A Line in the Sandwich" | 0:54 |
| 28. | "A Star Is Drawn" | 0:36 |
| 29. | "Saboteur of Duty" | 1:22 |
| 30. | "Thus Passeth Paci" | 0:41 |
| 31. | "Dis-Dressed Out" | 1:10 |
| 32. | "Script Monster" | 0:44 |
| 33. | "What Teens Want" | 0:55 |
| 34. | "The Strife of Riley" | 1:07 |
| 35. | "There's No I in Dream" | 0:33 |
| 36. | "Carousel of Nightmares" | 1:57 |
| 37. | "Lucidity" | 3:00 |
| 38. | "Boom Go the Speakers" (Performed by Animatics) | 2:37 |
| 39. | "Happy Go Riley" | 1:16 |
| 40. | "New Management" | 0:44 |
| 41. | "Sweeter (When You're Dancing)" (Written by Jonathan Pakfar and Shane Eli Abrahams Produced by Campfire Performed by Lily Elise) | 2:57 |
| 42. | "Dream on Ends" | 2:48 |

== Release ==
All four episodes of Dream Productions were released on Disney+ on December 11, 2024. The series was originally scheduled to be released by the spring of 2025 but it was brought forward, having swapped its release date with the Pixar television series Win or Lose.

The series made its linear television debut on August 4, 2025 on Disney Channel, with Disney XD following a few weeks later on August 30, 2025.

== Reception ==
=== Viewership ===
Disney+, which calculates its "Top 10" list by considering daily views for episodes and movies alongside the growing popularity of newly released titles, announced that Dream Productions was the most popular title in the U.S. upon its debut. The Walt Disney Company revealed that the first episode garnered 5.6 million views worldwide in its first five days, marking the biggest premiere for an animated series on Disney+ since What If...? in 2021. The series maintained the top position on Disney+'s "Top 10" list until December 29. Dream Productions later moved to fifth place on December 30. Nielsen Media Research, which records streaming viewership on U.S. television screens, estimated that Dream Productions garnered 6.3 million viewers in the U.S. over its first 35 days, making it one of the most popular shows of the 2024–2025 season.

=== Critical response ===
The review aggregator website Rotten Tomatoes reported a 75% approval rating with an average rating of 6.5/10, based on 20 critic reviews. The website's critics consensus reads, "A chipper spin-off from the Inside Out assembly line, Dream Productions's combination of genuine sentiment and meta satire works a charm." Metacritic, which uses a weighted average, assigned a score of 67 out of 100 based on 14 critics, indicating "generally favorable" reviews.

Lucy Mangan of The Guardian found Dream Productions to be a joyful and delightful spin-off of Inside Out, describing it as a "Christmas miracle". She highlighted the series' wit, wisdom, and family-friendly humor, noting that it stays true to the spirit of the original films. Mangan appreciated the show's exploration of Riley as she enters adolescence, with Paula struggling to adapt to her evolving dreams. She found the addition of new characters like Xeni to be a fun and satirical touch. Mangan also noted that the series feels generous and full of heart, created out of a genuine desire to entertain rather than capitalize on the franchise. Mark Feeney of The Boston Globe appreciated Dream Productions for its mix of energetic storytelling, mockumentary style, and inside jokes related to filmmaking. He praised the voice cast, including Maya Rudolph and Richard Ayoade, and highlighted the high-quality animation and score. Feeney noted that although the show may appeal more to adults, it remains enjoyable for viewers of all ages, offering a mix of humor and creativity.

Joel Keller of Decider complimented Dream Productions for maintaining a connection to the Inside Out franchise, with several of the original voice actors returning and visual cues linking the series to the films. He appreciated the series' exploration of Riley's transition into preadolescence, noting how Paula struggles to adapt her dreams to Riley's changing needs. Keller found the show to have a good balance of humor and sentiment. He stated that while some references might go over younger children's heads, the physical comedy makes it enjoyable for all ages. John Nugent of Empire praised Dream Productions as one of Pixar's most ambitious small-screen projects, noting its satisfying narrative that expands on the Inside Out universe. He found the series to be witty, bright, and visually appealing, maintaining the tone of the original films. Nugent highlighted the mockumentary-style format, with Paula's character adding humor. He noted that while the series is not as emotional or profound as the films, it remains funny, with clever visual gags and a light-hearted yet chaotic atmosphere. Ed Potton of The Times gave it three stars, described the series as a mockumentary, and stated "as ever with Pixar, it works on multiple levels. Your kids might not get all the jokes, but they'll love the pacing, the comedy, the emotion, and the characters. Adults, meanwhile, will be reminded that Hollywood is rarely more entertaining and madcap than when it's navel-gazing."

=== Accolades ===
| Award | Date of Ceremony | Category | Nominee(s) | Result | Ref. |
|---|---|---|---|---|---|
| Annie Awards | February 8, 2025 | Best Limited Series | "A Night to Remember" | Won | |
| Annie Awards | February 8, 2025 | Outstanding Achievement for Animated Effects in an Animated Television/Broadcast Production | Gary Bruins, Jongwon Pak, Arturo Aguilar, Alan Browning and Alen Lai (for "A Night to Remember") | Nominated | |
| Annie Awards | February 8, 2025 | Outstanding Achievement for Character Animation in an Animated Television / Broadcast Production | Travis Hathaway (for "The Dream Team", "Out of Body" and "Romance!") | Nominated | |
| Annie Awards | February 8, 2025 | Outstanding Achievement for Character Design in an Animated Television / Broadcast Production | Grant Alexander (for "A Night to Remember") | Nominated | |
| Annie Awards | February 8, 2025 | Outstanding Achievement for Production Design in an Animated Television / Broadcast Production | Bert Berry and Josh Holtsclaw (for "The Dream Team") | Nominated | |
| Annie Awards | February 8, 2025 | Outstanding Achievement for Voice Acting in an Animated Television / Broadcast Production | Paula Pell (for "Out of Body") | Won | |
| Children's and Family Emmy Awards | March 2, 2026 | Outstanding Children's or Young Teen Animated Series | Mike Jones and Jaclyn Simon | Nominated | |
| Children's and Family Emmy Awards | March 2, 2026 | Outstanding Younger Voice Performer in a Preschool, Children’s or Young Teen Program | Kensington Tallman | Nominated | |
| Children's and Family Emmy Awards | March 2, 2026 | Outstanding Single Voice Role Performer in a Children's or Young Teen Program | Maya Rudolph | Nominated | |
| Children's and Family Emmy Awards | March 2, 2026 | Outstanding Directing for an Animated Series | Mike Jones (for "A Night to Remember") | Nominated | |
| Children's and Family Emmy Awards | March 2, 2026 | Outstanding Casting for an Animated Program | Kate Hansen-Birnbaum, Natalie Lyon, Kevin Reher, and Lexi Diamond | Won | |
| Children's and Family Emmy Awards | March 2, 2026 | Outstanding Editing for an Animated Program | Tim Fox and Katie Schaefer Bishop (for "A Night to Remember") | Nominated | |
| Children's and Family Emmy Awards | March 2, 2026 | Outstanding Music Direction and Composition for an Animated Program | Nami Melumad (for "A Night to Remember") | Nominated | |
| Children's and Family Emmy Awards | March 2, 2026 | Outstanding Show Open | Josh Holtsclaw and Nami Melumad | Nominated | |
| Society of Composers & Lyricists Awards | February 12, 2025 | Outstanding Original Title Sequence for a Television Production | Nami Melumad | Nominated | |
