= Orange Bird =

Disney mascot character

- Orange Bird represented in an illustration made for FigPin
- First appearance: Walt Disney Studios' The Orange Bird (1971)
- Created by: The Walt Disney Company; Bob Moore; Don McLaughlin
- Designed by: Bob Moore; Don McLaughlin
- Species: Orange canary (with a sweet orange head)
- Gender: Male

Orange Bird is a Disney character first created in 1969 and debuted in 1971 as a mascot for the Florida Citrus Commission, in exchange for them sponsoring the Enchanted Tiki Room attraction and Sunshine Tree Terrace at the Magic Kingdom theme park. Orange Bird is an animated anthropomorphic orange canary with leaves for wings.

== Personality ==
Unlike other animated birds, Orange Bird is incapable of singing or speaking, and instead communicates with orange-colored smoke clouds.

== Appearances ==
=== Advertising and animated shorts ===
Orange Bird appeared on national television, print and radio ads for Florida oranges alongside singer Anita Bryant. In 1971, Bryant narrated a record album telling the character's story. The album included an illustrated 10-page storybook, and included back-up singing by the Mike Sammes Singers. Orange Bird appeared on the cover of Citrus and Vegetable Magazine in 1977. Orange Bird later had a solo career and appeared in a few Disney educational shorts in the 1980s such as "Foods and Fun: A Nutrition Adventure" and "The Orange Bird and the Nutrition Bandwagon". The Sherman Brothers, better known for writing the songs for the Disney films Mary Poppins (1964) and The Jungle Book (1967), also wrote "The Orange Bird Song" for the album, which became the theme song for Orange Bird. Orange Bird became a ubiquitous citrus icon, particularly throughout the State of Florida and United States. Orange Bird is featured in exhibits at the Orange County Regional History Museum in Orlando, Florida and McKay Archives at Florida Southern College.

=== Disney theme parks ===
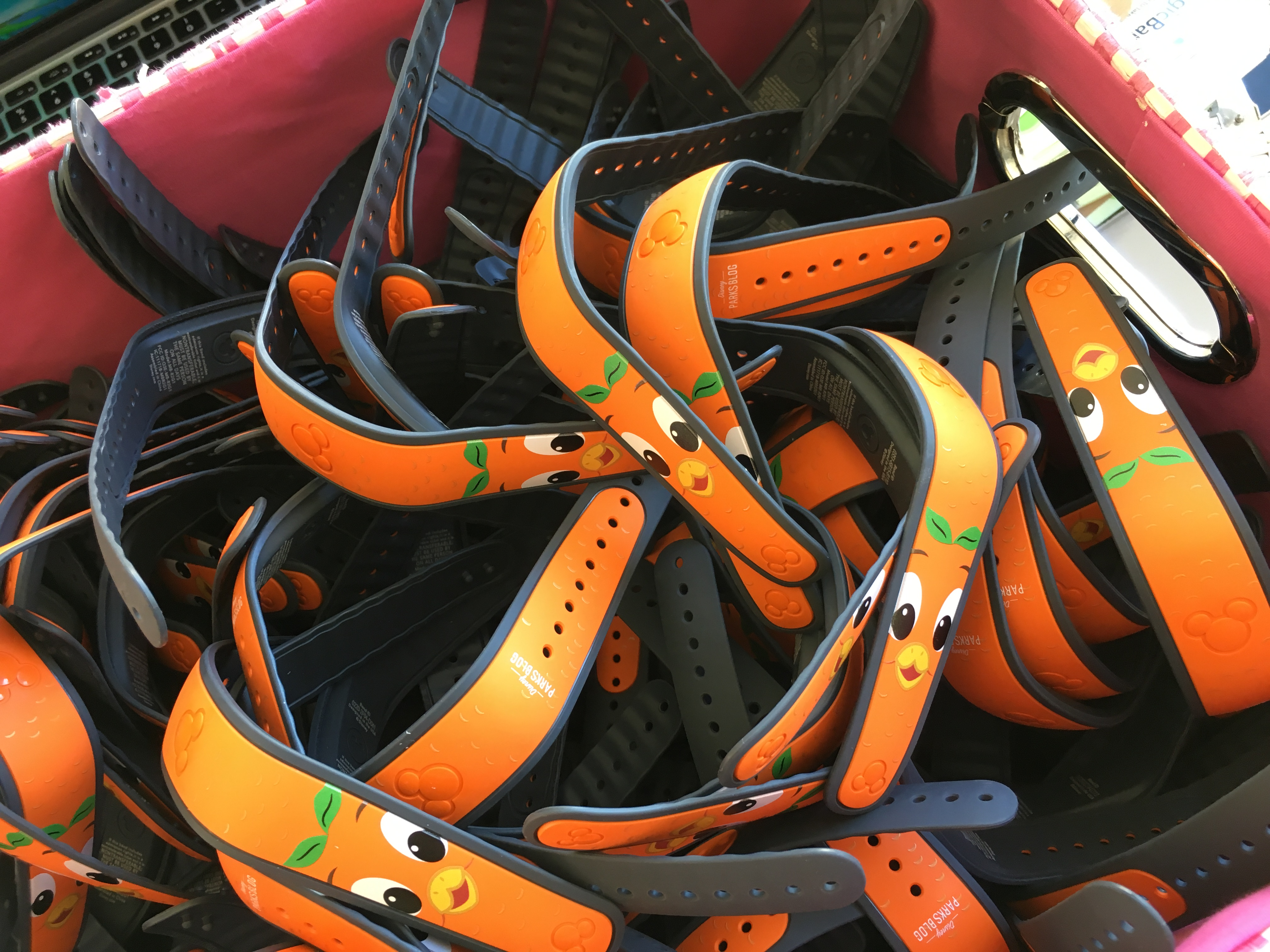
Orange Bird MagicBands

In the 1970s, Orange Bird appeared at Magic Kingdom as a walk-around character. He would often be found walking throughout Adventureland, outside the Enchanted Tiki Room. A figure of the character was also perched in a spot behind the counters of the Sunshine Tree Terrace, which has since been restored to the location after having spent years in the Disney Archives. Orange Bird merchandise can be found in retail locations at both Walt Disney World and the Disneyland Resort.

In 2004, Orange Bird was featured at Tokyo Disneyland due to the character's high popularity in Japan. The Walt Disney Company created merchandising to coincide with Japan's annual Orange Day on April 14. The Orange Bird soon returned to appearing regularly on merchandise in the United States Disney Store as well. This includes t-shirts, pins, ear hats, Vinylmation figures, and cups shaped like Orange Bird.

In April 2012, Orange Bird made a return to a fully restored Sunshine Tree Terrace at Walt Disney World's Magic Kingdom.

=== Others ===
Orange Bird appeared in other sources such as the Disney Kingdoms comic book series (appeared as a character in the Enchanted Tiki Room issue), the 2015 Inside Out book The Bing Bong Book (appeared as a cameo in one of the pages), a line of clothing and apparel including a magnetic shoulder plush since February 2021, the video game Disney Speedstorm (appears as a Crew Member for Figment), and the video game Disney Magic Kingdoms (as a playable character to unlock for a limited time).
