= Kensington Tallman =

American actress (born 2008)

- Born: August 6, 2008 (age 18)
- Occupation: Actress
- Years active: 2018–present
- Known for: Voice of Riley Andersen in Inside Out 2

Kensington Tallman (born August 6, 2008) is an American actress. She is best known for voicing Riley Andersen in Pixar's Inside Out 2 (2024), the former highest-grossing animated film of all time, a performance that earned her a Children's and Family Emmy nomination for the Disney+ spin-off Dream Productions. She has also starred as a series regular on Nickelodeon's Drama Club (2021) and had a recurring role on That Girl Lay Lay (2021–2024). A classically trained violinist who performed at Carnegie Hall, Tallman graduated high school at 15 as a straight-A student and member of the National Honor Society.

== Early life and education ==
Tallman was born on August 6, 2008, in New York City. She began performing arts at age eight after being discovered at her brother's modeling audition. Before acting, she performed as a violinist at Carnegie Hall. Raised in both New York City and Los Angeles, she graduated high school at 15 as a straight-A student and a member of the National Honor Society, and planned to attend college in fall 2024 to study film.

== Career ==
Tallman made her television debut in 2018 with a guest role on the Netflix series The Good Cop. She went on to appear in guest roles on shows such as Black Monday, Side Hustle, and TBS's Chad.

In 2021, she landed her first main role as Bianca Magic on the Nickelodeon series Drama Club. She also appeared as a recurring character, Tiffany Highlander, on the Nickelodeon series That Girl Lay Lay across all seasons.

In 2024, she starred as Lucy in the international music-filled comedy Home Sweet Rome!, which aired on Max in the US, BBC in the UK, and Rai in Italy.

Tallman voices the character Gauge on the Disney Jr. animated series Firebuds and Honey Bear on Nick Jr.'s Bossy Bear. Her voice acting work also includes roles of Gabby in Blaze and the Monster Machines and Miranda Cornwallis in Ridley Jones.

=== Inside Out 2 and subsequent voice work ===
In 2024, Tallman was cast as the voice of Riley Andersen in Pixar's Inside Out 2, the sequel to the 2015 film. To prepare for the role, she worked with a dialect coach and rewatched the first film before each recording session. She drew on her own experiences with anxiety to portray the teenage Riley. The film became the highest-grossing animated film of all time. Tallman reprised the role in the Disney+ spin-off series Dream Productions, for which she received a Children's and Family Emmy nomination for her performance.

=== Upcoming releases ===
In December 2025, Tallman was confirmed to be part of the cast for the independent drama One In A Million, a film shot in Dallas, Texas. The story follows a family's efforts to save their son from a severe and uncommon blood disease, and includes performances from Lou Diamond Phillips, Rob Morgan, Flavor Flav, Wayne Knight, and Grace Byers.

== Advocacy and personal life ==
Tallman is a mental health advocate and has spoken on panels including the Sages + Scientists Symposium at Harvard University. She is a brand ambassador for Girl Well, a nonprofit that provides self-care kits to under-sheltered teenage girls. Tallman is vegan and an animal rights activist. She has worked with PETA2 and starred in a campaign titled "Be an Angel for Animals. Please, Go Vegan," volunteers at The Gentle Barn educating visitors and caring for rescued animals, and supports children's charities including St. Jude and No Kid Hungry.

In October 2024, she partnered with Saving Our Daughters for their Little Cinderella Reporters initiative, a Q&A session around World Mental Health Day where she discussed mental health, self-confidence, and her experiences in the entertainment industry with young girls, and distributed handmade affirmation cards to attendees.

== Filmography ==
=== Film ===
Year	Title	Role	Notes
2020	The SpongeBob Movie: Sponge on the Run	Additional voices	Voice role
2022	Motorvation	Mayor Bob's Kid	
2024	Summer Camp	Young Ginny	
2024	Inside Out 2	Riley Andersen	Voice role

=== Television ===
Year	Title	Role	Notes
2018	The Good Cop	Amateur magician	Episode: "What Is the Supermodel's Secret?"
2019	Barbapapa – One Big Happy Family	Boomimi	Voice role
2020	Black Monday	Young Ivanka Trump	Episode: "Fore!"
2020	Side Hustle	Ruby	Episode: "Friendiversary"
2021	Chad	Avery	Episode: "Squad"
2021	Drama Club	Bianca Magic	Main role
2021–2024	That Girl Lay Lay	Tiffany Highlander	Recurring role
2022	Nick Shorts Showcase	Various roles	Writer on 2 episodes
2022	Ridley Jones	Miranda Cornwallis	Guest voice role
2022–2023	Blaze and the Monster Machines	Blue Mermaid, Gabby	Guest voice role (season 6); Main voice role (early season 7)
2022–2025	Firebuds	Gauge	Recurring voice role
2023	Home Sweet Rome	Lucy	Main role
2024	Dream Productions	Riley Andersen	Main voice role; Disney+ spin-off series
2025	Pupstruction	Mittens	Guest voice role
