= Disney Emoji Blitz =

Tile-matching mobile game

- Developers: Disney Interactive (2016–2019); Jam City (2019–present)
- Publishers: Disney Mobile (2016–2019); Jam City (2019–present)
- Engine: Unity
- Platforms: iOS, Android
- Release: NA: July 14, 2016; JP: April 1, 2020
- Genre: Puzzle

Disney Emoji Blitz is a match three puzzle mobile game originally created by Disney Interactive, and formerly published by Disney Mobile. The general concept of the game is to match three Disney characters in the form of stylized emojis scattered throughout one board.

== Development ==
In November 2017, Star Wars was introduced to the game during the "Star Wars Villain" event, with emojis of Rey, Finn, BB-8, and Kylo Ren being added to promote the release of Star Wars: The Last Jedi.

In 2019, Jam City took over the development and publishing operations as a result of Disney's decision to directly pull out of the video game industry a few years earlier, by closing their in-house units and instead licensing their properties to other developers.

From February 15 to 18, 2020, players had the opportunity to unlock the titular character and The Child from The Mandalorian during the "Star Wars Challenge Event", with the characters returning later that year throughout November 25–30 for the "Multi-Map Villain Event", alongside new emojis of Cara Dune, the Death Trooper, and Moff Gideon.

In 2022, it was announced that content for Obi-Wan Kenobi, Ice Age, and Hocus Pocus 2 would be released, alongside a Jungle Book collection, and emojis of Bruno and Luisa Madrigal from Encanto, in celebration of the game's sixth year anniversary.

== Release ==
Disney Emoji Blitz was released on July 14, 2016, for iOS and Android devices. Approximately 400 emojis were available at launch, across different Disney and Pixar franchises, such as Mickey & Friends, Alice in Wonderland, The Little Mermaid, The Lion King, Toy Story, Monsters Inc., and Lilo & Stitch, among various others. The game would later make its official debut in Japan on April 1, 2020.

== Reception ==
Ara Wagoner of Android Central criticized the game's built-in custom emoji keyboard feature, noting its potential, but brought up the "downright terrible" implementation and stating "it's pretty much par for the course for custom emoji packs." She went on further by saying that the character emojis were "relatively easy to navigate, if a little simplistic", and also noted the lack of a search option to find a specific emoji.
