= Inside Out Thought Bubbles =

2015 mobile game

Inside Out Thought Bubbles is a mobile game based on the film Inside Out. Released in 2015, the game was created by the same developer as Where's My Water?. Kongregate took over development of the game in 2020.
