= Joy (Inside Out) =

- Inside Out character
- Joy as she appears in Inside Out
- First appearance: Inside Out (2015)
- Created by: Pete Docter; Ronnie del Carmen
- Based on: Joy (emotion)
- Designed by: Albert Lozano
- Voiced by: Amy Poehler

Joy is a fictional character who appears in Disney/Pixar's Inside Out franchise. She is one of several emotions inside the mind of Riley Andersen, being the literal embodiment of joy and the lead emotion in Riley's head. Joy's character and development are central themes in both movies. In the 2015 film, she is the protagonist and is primarily voiced by Amy Poehler.

Joy's popularity in Inside Out has led to multiple other appearances in related media. The character returns in Inside Out 2 (2024) once again as one of the protagonists and as a supporting character in the Disney+ spin-off show, Dream Productions.

== Concept and creation ==
In early stages of development for Inside Out, Joy was going to be the main source of narrative tension as she wouldn't let Riley grow up. Kevin Nolting said they changed the character arc as "the essence of the problem was, Joy wasn't likable, she was putting Riley in embarrassing situations; Riley was in middle school, but Joy was making her act like a child. As an audience member, you weren't rooting for Joy." Joy was going to be paired with Fear and not Sadness for the film's story, but this was changed as the writers found Joy and Sadness as more dynamic viewing. From the early stages of production, director Pete Docter was set on Joy being the film's protagonist, as reason for why she is the only emotion with a common name. Like the other emotions, her primary color was chosen based on color theory, where yellow is associated with happiness. Docter has said Joy was the hardest character to write in the film, due to her positive attitude potentially grating on people, so her contrast with Sadness and development from it was given a major role in the story to avoid this. Joy's voice actress Amy Poehler added saying Joy and Sadness were written to play off each other. Poehler's casting was also incorporated to ensure the character would not annoy the audiences.

According to designers, Joy was given bare feet and a pixie cut to reinforce her "rambunctious" nature, as well as a blue hair color to avoid comparisons to the Peter Pan character Tinker Bell. The character was designed so that she could incorporate larger-than-life movements, notably in her running. The character's body shape was also based on that of a star, done to emphasize her energetic personality.

== Personality ==
As her name would suggest, Joy is vivacious and has a cheerful, peppy and optimistic attitude, mainly wanting the best for Riley. However, this causes her to act somewhat selfishly towards the other emotions, particularly Sadness, as Joy likes to be in control of how Riley feels. While she thinks of herself as a people person, Joy grows easily frustrated with anyone who doesn't share her worldview. She's happiest when she's in charge, and she's confident that her way is always the right way.

As the movie goes on, Joy learns to accept Sadness as an integral part of Riley's mind. Instead of Joy being in charge all the time, Riley arrives to a balance between the different emotions. Towards the end of the movie Joy feels guilty of her role in Riley's struggles and says "I just wanted Riley to be happy". Amy Poehler stated "Joy goes through her own journey in the film: She realizes that she has to also be sad. And so when we were working on the character together, it was like: What level are we at in the beginning? Can we modulate that? And how does she change?" Joy cries herself, showing that she can have her own emotions.

== Appearances ==
=== Films and television ===
==== Inside Out ====
Joy first appeared in the 2015 Pixar film Inside Out. Joy is the first emotion born in Riley's head before she goes on to explain that five humanized emotions live in Riley's head which influence her actions. Riley's world is turned upside down when her family move from Minnesota to San Francisco, California. The move causes the other emotions to act up, but Joy is able to remain in control of headquarters; however, when she and Sadness get into a struggle, they accidentally end up in the distant part of the brain and have to find their way back.

At one point Joy and Bing Bong fall into the "Memory Dump", where old memories made by Riley go to be forgotten. Bing Bong sacrifices himself so Joy can get out and get to headquarters. After getting out of the Memory Dump, Joy attempts to find Sadness. She then sees her flying on a cloud, and chases after her. She finds that Sadness is close to headquarters, and flings herself to Sadness, and they finally arrive back home. The others tell Joy to fix Riley's problem, but Joy gives that job to Sadness instead, because they need her to help Riley. Sadness successfully removes the idea of running away from Riley's mind, and Riley starts heading back home. Joy gives Sadness the core memories, and they turn into sad ones. Sadness makes Riley remember all of these memories one by one, and takes control of the panel, and Riley finally reveals her true feelings to her parents - she hates San Francisco, misses the good old days in Minnesota, and that she was pretending to be happy, and was afraid of making them mad because she has always been their "happy girl." Riley's parents admit they feel the same way, and a brand-new core memory is made; it is a mix of happiness and sadness.

==== Riley's First Date? ====
Joy returns in the follow-up short film Riley's First Date?, witnessing Riley's interactions with her parents.

==== Inside Out 2 ====
Joy appears in the sequel, Inside Out 2, with Amy Poehler reprising her role.

==== Dream Productions ====
Joy appears in the Inside Out spin-off TV show entitled Dream Productions for Disney+.

=== Video games ===
==== Disney Infinity 3.0 ====
Joy, along with the other emotions was included in Disney Infinity 3.0 as a playable character. The playset was first sold in August 2015. The movie received its own game with the playset, where Joy and the other emotions aim to prevent Riley from having nightmares when an incident causes Riley to accidentally change the television channel from a kitten-themed program to a swamp monster show that she saw a glimpse of as she fell asleep. Joy is given a special feature where she can "glide across great distances with ease".

==== Disney Magic Kingdoms ====
Joy appears as a playable character to unlock during a limited time in the world-building game Disney Magic Kingdoms, being introduced in a limited time event with a storyline that takes place at some point after the first Inside Out film.

== Reception ==
Joy's cheerful personality itself proved popular but her journey and development throughout the film also received much acclaim, notably her realization of sadness being essential. A.O. Scott praised her characterization saying "Joy reigns supreme. Even without an organizational chart, you can tell she's the boss. She's a sparkling whirlwind of positive energy and friendly micro-management."

Amy Poehler's voice work as Joy received critical acclaim. Bilge Ebiri of Vulture said "The more I watch Inside Out, the more I realize just how much of the film rests on Poehler's shoulders. And she's amazing in it." Poehler's performance was described as "effervescent" by IGN in 2015.

== See also ==
- Anxiety (Inside Out) - another Inside Out emotion
