= Inside Out 2 =

2024 film by Kelsey Mann

- Theatrical release poster
- Directed by: Kelsey Mann
- Screenplay by: Meg LeFauve; Dave Holstein
- Story by: Kelsey Mann; Meg LeFauve
- Produced by: Mark Nielsen
- Starring: Amy Poehler; Phyllis Smith; Lewis Black; Tony Hale; Liza Lapira; Maya Hawke; Ayo Edebiri; Adèle Exarchopoulos; Paul Walter Hauser; Kensington Tallman; Diane Lane; Kyle MacLachlan
- Cinematography: Adam Habib; Jonathan Pytko
- Edited by: Maurissa Horwitz
- Music by: Andrea Datzman (Note: Original Inside Out themes by Michael Giacchino)
- Production company: Pixar Animation Studios
- Distributed by: Walt Disney Studios; Motion Pictures (Note: Distributed under the Walt Disney Pictures banner.)
- Release dates: June 10, 2024 (El Capitan Theatre); June 14, 2024 (United States)
- Running time: 96 minutes
- Country: United States
- Language: English
- Budget: $200 million
- Box office: $1.699 billion

Inside Out 2 is a 2024 American animated coming-of-age film directed by Kelsey Mann (Note: While Mann is the final film's sole credited director, multiple anonymous ex-Pixar employees who worked on the film and were subsequently laid off in May 2024 without receiving a bonus reported that just after the end of the 2023 SAG-AFTRA strike in September 2023, Pixar CCO Pete Docter "stepped in as uncredited co-director, working heavily alongside credited director Kelsey Mann". This was later confirmed by Docter himself, admitting to having directed "a little bit on Inside Out 2" following an unfavorable audience preview after the end of the actors strike, and also having admitted to animating "[...]a pivotal moment" in the film when acting "[...]as an animator for a day.") and written by Meg LeFauve and Dave Holstein. Produced by Pixar Animation Studios for Walt Disney Pictures, it is the sequel to Inside Out (2015). Amy Poehler, Phyllis Smith, Lewis Black, Diane Lane, and Kyle MacLachlan reprise their roles from the first film, with Maya Hawke, Kensington Tallman (replacing Kaitlyn Dias from the first film), Liza Lapira (replacing Mindy Kaling from the first film), Tony Hale (replacing Bill Hader from the first film), Ayo Edebiri, Lilimar, Grace Lu, Sumayyah Nuriddin-Green, Adèle Exarchopoulos, and Paul Walter Hauser joining the cast. The film follows Riley's emotions unexpectedly joined by new emotions, eager to take control of her mind.

Development on Inside Out 2 began in early 2020, with Mann drawing inspiration from personal childhood experiences. The creative team initially explored a wider range of new emotions before narrowing the focus for narrative clarity, with Anxiety emerging as a central addition. Clinical psychologists, including Lisa Damour and Dacher Keltner, were consulted to ensure an accurate portrayal of adolescent emotional development, while a group of teenagers provided feedback on character and story authenticity. The film's premise shifted during development from a talent show to Riley's involvement in hockey. The production also marked the first Pixar feature scored by a woman, Andrea Datzman. Animation development emphasized spatial consistency through isometric mapping, and casting changes were driven in part by compensation disputes, resulting in the recasting of the characters Fear and Disgust.

Inside Out 2 premiered at the El Capitan Theatre in Hollywood, Los Angeles, on June 10, 2024, and was released in the United States on June 14. The film received positive reviews from critics and was a massive box office success, grossing $1.699 billion worldwide, breaking multiple box-office records, becoming the highest-grossing film by Pixar and the highest-grossing animated film of all time, though it was later overtaken by Ne Zha 2 (2025) just nine months after its initial release. It also became the highest-grossing film of 2024 and the eighth-highest-grossing film at the time of its release. The film received nominations for Best Animated Feature at the Golden Globes, Critics' Choice, BAFTAs and Academy Awards. It additionally received a nomination for Cinematic and Box Office Achievement at the Golden Globes.

== Plot ==
Two years after her move to San Francisco, (Note: As depicted in Inside Out (2015)) 13-year-old Riley Andersen is entering high school. Her personified emotions—Joy, Sadness, Fear, Disgust, and Anger—now oversee a newly formed element of Riley's mind called her "Sense of Self", which houses memories and feelings that shape Riley's beliefs. Joy, aiming to fill the Sense of Self with only good memories, has created a spring-loaded mechanism that launches bad memories to the back of Riley's mind.

Riley and her best friends, Bree and Grace, are invited to a three-day ice hockey camp, where Riley hopes to qualify for her new school's team, the Fire Hawks. In Headquarters, the puberty alarm goes off the night before camp, and several mind workers abruptly upgrade the emotion console, whilst leaving Headquarters in disarray. The emotions find that Riley now overreacts to any inputs they make to the console. Four new emotions—Anxiety, Envy, Embarrassment, and Ennui—arrive and clash with the original emotions over their approaches. In particular, Joy wants Riley to have fun at camp, while Anxiety focuses on winning a spot on the team and making new friends, especially given that Bree and Grace will be attending a different high school. Under Joy's control, Riley inadvertently gets the campers in trouble by the strict camp director, Coach Roberts. Anxiety, deciding that Riley needs to change to fit in with the older players, launches the Sense of Self to the back of the mind and has the old emotions bottled up and thrown into a vault. The new emotions then plan to create a new anxiety-dominated Sense of Self and encourage Riley to befriend popular hockey player Valentina "Val" Ortiz, straining her friendship with Bree and Grace. After the original emotions escape the vault, Joy sends Sadness back to Headquarters with a two-way radio while she and the others retrieve the Sense of Self. Sadness is discovered by Embarrassment, who decides to help her remain hidden.

Under Anxiety's control, Riley sneaks into Coach Roberts' office and learns from her notebook that Riley is not considered ready yet to become a Fire Hawk. The four original emotions find the old Sense of Self on a mountain of bad memories deposited by Joy's mechanism. Anxiety, overhearing Joy's plan through the two-way radio, destroys the recall tube, stranding Joy and the other emotions in the back of Riley's mind. Joy breaks down as she cannot figure out how to save Riley. The emotions use dynamite to blow up the cliff supporting the bad memories, sending them careening into the belief pool and riding the flood to return to Headquarters. Anxiety realizes her plan to create a new Sense of Self has backfired, having generated one of self-doubt and inferiority, which causes Riley to perform poorly during her final tryout match, accidentally crash into Grace, and get sent to the penalty box. Horrified, Anxiety tries to help Riley but frantically swarms the console in a blinding whirlwind, causing Riley to have a panic attack.

Returning to Headquarters, Joy finds Anxiety still in control but paralyzed and heavily distressed; Joy convinces her that Riley doesn't need to change to have a better future. Anxiety relents and Joy reinstates Riley's original Sense of Self, but the panic attack persists. Anxiety apologizes to Joy, admitting that neither she, nor any of the emotions, gets to choose who Riley is. Joy, realizing that Anxiety is telling the truth, removes the first Sense of Self, allowing a new one to form from both Riley's good and bad memories. The emotions embrace this third self, calming Riley and helping her reconcile with Bree and Grace. The console calls for Joy, who reassumes command and helps Riley happily finish the hockey tryouts.

Riley befriends Val and the other Fire Hawks at high school, while maintaining her friendship with Bree and Grace. Living in peace, the nine emotions work together to protect Riley, as she happily checks her phone for the Fire Hawks' recruitment results.

== Voice cast ==
- Amy Poehler as Joy, a yellow emotion who often takes the lead in Riley's emotional life, and is in charge of giving her assurance in her everyday life and helping her enjoy it to the fullest, while being reluctant to accept any influence that could detract from Riley's happiness
- Phyllis Smith as Sadness, a blue emotion who helps Riley process upsetting experiences and seek help from others when she needs it
- Tony Hale as Fear, a purple emotion responsible for protecting Riley from threats in the physical world. Hale replaces Bill Hader from the first film.
- Liza Lapira as Disgust, a green emotion who uses visceral aversion and gut reactions to prevent Riley from being physically or socially harmed. Lapira replaces Mindy Kaling from the first film.
- Lewis Black as Anger, a red emotion in charge of fighting to keep things fair for Riley, who also helps her channel her aggression when she plays hockey
- Maya Hawke as Anxiety, a new orange emotion who catastrophizes every situation, with the stated intention of averting bad outcomes for Riley
- Ayo Edebiri as Envy, a new cyan emotion who motivates Riley to pursue what others have
- Adèle Exarchopoulos as Ennui, a new indigo emotion with a French accent who expresses Riley's boredom and also deflects uncomfortable situations with sarcasm, feigned disinterest, or taciturn responses. Exarchopoulos reprised her role in both European French and Canadian French dubs of the movie.
- Paul Walter Hauser as Embarrassment, a new pink emotion who, in response to Riley's embarrassment, hides his face inside a hoodie
- Kensington Tallman as Riley Andersen, a 13-year-old girl in whose mind the emotions and their supporting staff of Mind Workers live. Tallman replaces Kaitlin Dias from the first film.
- Lilimar as Valentina "Val" Ortiz, a popular hockey player at Riley's high school
- Grace Lu as Grace Hsieh, Riley's friend
- Sumayyah Nuriddin-Green as Breonna "Bree" Young, Riley's friend
- Diane Lane as Jill Andersen, Riley's mother
- Kyle MacLachlan as Bill Andersen, Riley's father
- Yvette Nicole Brown as Coach Roberts, head of the summer hockey camp
- Ron Funches as Bloofy, a character from Riley's favorite childhood TV show, Bloofy's House.
- James Austin Johnson as Pouchy, a talking fanny pack and Bloofy's sidekick.
- Yong Yea as Lance Slashblade, a heroic video game character whom Riley was infatuated with when she was younger
- Steve Purcell as Deep Dark Secret, an imposing and shadowy but timid figure who represents a secret Riley has told no one, namely a time when she accidentally burned a hole in a rug
- Paula Pell as Jill's Anger
- Pete Docter as Bill's Anger
- Dave Goelz as Subconscious Guard Frank
- Frank Oz as Subconscious Guard Dave
- John Ratzenberger as Fritz, a Mind Worker mechanic who upgrades and maintains the console in Headquarters
- Flea as Mind Worker Cop Jake, a police officer in Riley's "Imagination Land" theme park
- Bobby Moynihan as Forgetter Bobby, a Mind Worker who disposes of Riley's obsolete memories
- Paula Poundstone as Forgetter Paula, Bobby's colleague
- June Squibb as Nostalgia, a new beige emotion with an elderly appearance who fondly recalls past events, which due to Riley's youth are always quite recent.

Additionally, television personality Sam Thompson cameos in the UK version of the film as Security Man Sam, a character who finds himself on a chase with the emotions.

== Production ==
=== Development ===
After the critical and commercial success of Inside Out (2015), Entertainment Tonight and The Guardian considered a sequel to be "inevitable". Inside Out director Pete Docter was germinating ideas for a sequel while the original film's nominations were unveiled at the 88th Academy Awards in January 2016. Development on Inside Out 2 began in January 2020, after director Kelsey Mann revisited photos of one of his childhood birthday parties. Pixar officially confirmed the sequel's development during the D23 Expo announcement in September 2022, with Amy Poehler coming on stage to discuss the film alongside Docter. Mann was announced as the director of the sequel, with Mark Nielsen producing, while Meg LeFauve was announced to write the film's screenplay, returning from its predecessor.

To utilize "truthful" worldbuilding, Mann used Docter's "five to 27 emotions" idea from the first film that he pitched during its production. Mann's first pass included nine new emotions to make Joy feel overwhelmed with all the new emotions showing up, but felt that the story could not keep track with so many emotions taking the spotlight or not adding to the story, so after the first screening, he decided to simplify the number. Among those emotions was Schadenfreude (having joy at someone's expense), Jealousy and Guilt, but the latter two influenced the film despite being removed, with Mann feeling that Envy could relate to Jealousy and how remnants of Guilt could be found within Anxiety's introduction, even giving Anxiety some of Guilt's baggage, which was inspired by that of Disneyland hotels. The 2019 film Uncut Gems was cited as an inspiration for all of Anxiety's scenes, especially the visually intensive ones.

=== Research and writing ===
The production team frequently consulted author and clinical psychologist Lisa Damour and used her books as guidance on accurately portraying how teenagers' emotions change during puberty. Professor of psychology at the University of California, Berkeley, Dacher Keltner, who helped on the first Inside Out, returned as a consultant as well. Keltner served as a primary scientific advisor to the filmmakers, guiding them on which emotions should be introduced. While a character representing shame was initially developed for the narrative, it was ultimately omitted. This decision was influenced by Keltner's psychological assessment that shame is not a distinct primary emotion, alongside concerns that the character was too heavy for an animated feature. Following these researches, Riley's image is modified to signify her pubescent transition for the sequel, including growth.

To assist with the development of the film, Pixar enlisted a group of nine teenagers, who were dubbed "Riley's Crew", to provide feedback on the film to ensure it accurately portrayed modern teenage life. Their input led to the inclusion of the emotion Nostalgia and influenced various scenes, including everyday elements of the emotions' lives and the transition from middle school to high school. Nielsen and Mann were also inspired by their own daughters when crafting the film. As development on the story began during lockdown due to the COVID-19 pandemic, the two were able to gather personal research from studying their children, some of whom were Riley's age in the film. Their perspective as parents helped in shaping the film and characterizing the emotions, especially Joy.

Initially, the plot of the film was to involve a talent show, but that idea ended up being scrapped. After about three test screenings, Nielsen, Mann, and LeFauve decided it was best to center the story on Riley playing hockey, as they felt it was a unique aspect of her character. The decision was also influenced by input Mann received from Turning Red director Domee Shi when he asked how to make the film unique from other teenage coming-of-age stories, including her own. The scene where the old emotions are locked in a vault was originally longer but was trimmed down as several gags were cut out due to time constraints.

During production, several Pixar employees felt concerned after several of their films, including Lightyear (2022) and Elemental (2023), had financially underperformed, thus the box-office fate of Inside Out 2 was described as a "life or death situation". Relatively late into the animation process, the production was affected by the concurring 2023 Writers Guild of America (WGA) and SAG-AFTRA strikes. While Elio (2025) had its release pushed back a year, Pixar was adamant about retaining Inside Out 2 to its scheduled release date, resulting in "the largest crunch in the studio's history." According to multiple undisclosed sources, this resulted in "last-minute" changes, in which Docter stepped in as an uncredited co-director.

=== Casting ===
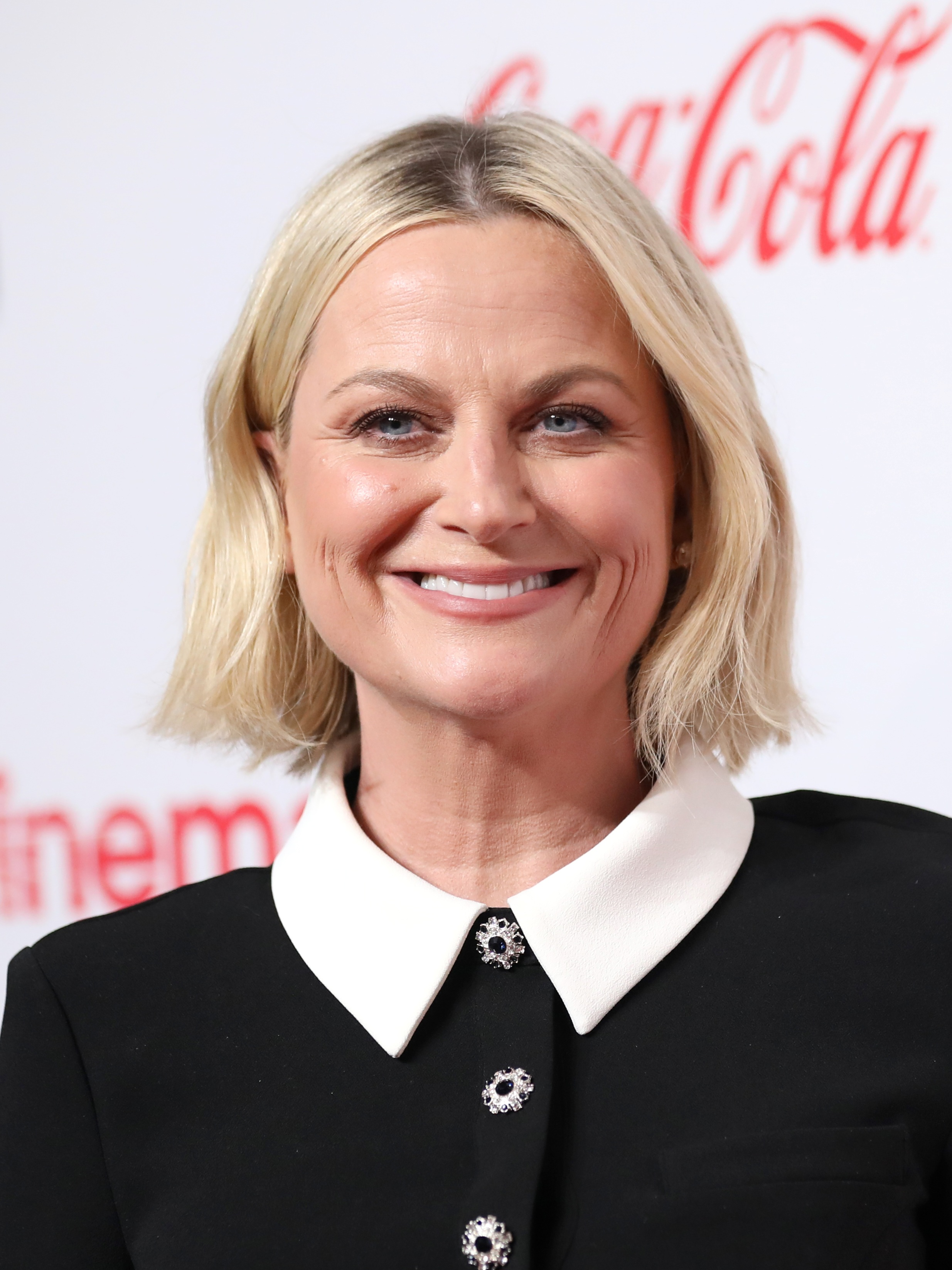
Amy Poehler reprised her role as Joy from the original film.

Poehler accepted an offer of $5 million with lucrative bonuses to reprise her role as Joy from the first film. Phyllis Smith and Lewis Black also reprise their roles from the first film, voicing Sadness and Anger, respectively. Following a dispute over pay, both Bill Hader and Mindy Kaling declined to reprise their respective roles as Fear and Disgust; they and the rest of the returning cast were reportedly offered $100,000 each, equivalent to two percent of Poehler's salary. On November 9, 2023, with the release of the teaser trailer, it was revealed that Tony Hale and Liza Lapira would replace Hader and Kaling as Fear and Disgust, respectively, while Maya Hawke joined the cast as Anxiety, a new emotion. Mann auditioned Hawke via Zoom at the office of a back room in Epcot during a family vacation with his kids after Nielsen told him that Hawke was available to audition just then, with her anxious performance driving him to tears. On January 16, 2024, it was revealed that June Squibb had joined the cast in an undisclosed role, later revealed to be Nostalgia.

On March 7, 2024, Disney revealed that both Diane Lane, and Kyle MacLachlan would reprise their roles as Mr. and Mrs. Anderson respectively, along with Ayo Edebiri, Adèle Exarchopoulos, Paul Walter Hauser, and Kensington Tallman joining the cast, with Edebiri, Exarchopoulos, and Hauser playing the other new emotions, Envy, Ennui, and Embarrassment, respectively. In addition, Tallman replaces Kaitlyn Dias as Riley Andersen, while Lane reprises her role as Mrs. Andersen, and MacLachlan also reprises his role as Mr. Andersen. John Ratzenberger reprises his role as Fritz, marking his first role in a Pixar film since Onward (2020). Also joining the cast in supporting roles are Lilimar, who plays a hockey player named Valentina, and Yvette Nicole Brown, who plays the coach of the hockey team, while Sumayyah Nuriddin-Green and Grace Lu play Bree and Grace, Riley's friends.

=== Animation ===
Story artist Rebecca McVeigh and lead editor Maurissa Horwitz played key roles in refining the film's emotional beats. Due to the iterative nature of animated filmmaking, sequences were frequently revised, with entire story segments being cut or reworked. Unlike live-action films, where editing primarily takes place after shooting, animation requires continuous interaction between departments. One of the major challenges in animating Inside Out 2 was maintaining consistency in the film's three-dimensional space while working with hand-drawn storyboards. McVeigh noted that early in her career, she primarily thought in 2D, but working at Pixar required her to adapt to a more spatially aware approach. To ensure accuracy, she often created isometric maps of environments to determine camera placement and background visibility.

=== Music ===
On March 7, 2024, with the release of the second trailer, it was reported that Andrea Datzman had composed the film's score, taking over for Michael Giacchino. This made Datzman the first woman to score a Pixar feature film. The soundtrack album was released by Walt Disney Records on June 14, 2024, the same day as the film.

== Release ==
Inside Out 2 premiered at the El Capitan Theatre in Hollywood, Los Angeles, on June 10, 2024, and was released in the United States on June 14, 2024. It also screened at the 2024 Annecy International Animation Film Festival that same day. The film was screened in various formats, including RealD 3D, IMAX and Dolby Cinema.

=== Marketing ===
The teaser trailer for the film, along with the poster, was released on November 9, 2023. James Withbrook of Gizmodo and Inverse's Rotem Rusak highlighted the introduction of three other emotions in the poster: Embarrassment, Ennui, and Envy. The teaser was viewed 157 million times in its first 24 hours, it was the most-watched animated film trailer until the teaser of Moana 2 surpassed that record in May 2024. (Note: Several publications reporting the film's box office and trailer listed The Lion King as live-action when considering records for animated films. While photorealistic, The Lion King was computer-animated.) A clip from the film was also aired during the Super Bowl LVIII. The second trailer, along with a new poster, was released on March 7, 2024. This trailer also marked the debut of the "standard" variant of the 2023 Walt Disney Pictures logo, which was introduced the year before for the studio's centennial anniversary. The first 35 minutes of the film were screened during the Walt Disney Studios' presentation of first looks at their 2024 theatrical release slate at CinemaCon on April 11, 2024. As part of a partnership with Airbnb, a new rental home in Nevada just outside of Las Vegas modeled after "headquarters" in the film was listed on the website beginning on June 12, 2024.

=== Home media ===
Walt Disney Studios Home Entertainment released Inside Out 2 for digital download on August 20, 2024, and on 4K Ultra HD Blu-ray, Blu-ray, and DVD on September 10. The Ultra HD Blu-ray and Blu-ray copies contain behind-the-scenes featurettes and deleted scenes with introductions by Director Kelsey Mann. The film was released on Disney+ on September 25, 2024.

Inside Out 2 generated 30.5 million views worldwide on Disney+ within its first five days. The release became the No. 1 film premiere year-to-date and marked the platform's most successful film premiere since Walt Disney Animation Studios' Encanto (2021). Inside Out 2 set records as the top film premiere of all time in both the EMEA (Europe, the Middle East, and Africa) and LATAM (Latin America) regions. Nielsen Media Research, which records streaming viewership on some U.S. television screens, reported that Inside Out 2 amassed 1.818 billion minutes of watch time from September 23–29, ranking as the most-streamed film of the week. The following week, from September 30 to October 6, the movie was streamed for 908 million minutes, maintaining its position as the most-streamed film. From October 7–13, Inside Out 2 was watched for 513 million minutes, making it the third most-streamed film that week. During October 14–20, it recorded 386 million minutes of watch time, making it the fourth most-streamed film of the week. Between from October 21–27, it garnered 309 million minutes, ranking fifth for the week.

== Reception ==
=== Box office ===
Inside Out 2 grossed $653 million in the United States and Canada, and $1.046 billion in other territories, for a worldwide total of $1.699 billion. Deadline Hollywood calculated the film's net profit as $650 million, accounting for production budgets, marketing, talent participations and other costs; box office grosses, television and streaming, and home media revenues, placing Inside Out 2 first on their list of most profitable films of 2024.

On a budget of $200 million, Inside Out 2 was initially projected to gross $80–90 million in its domestic opening weekend. The sub-$100 million industry projections were partially due to the notion that general audiences remained hesitant to return to theaters, given the direct-to-streaming releases of the Pixar films Soul (2020), Luca (2021), and Turning Red (2022) on Disney+, the underperformance of Pixar's Lightyear at the box office in 2022, and the lackluster box office results of several films in 2024. After making $63.6 million on its first day, including an estimated $13 million from Thursday night previews, projections were raised to $140–150 million for the weekend. It ended up grossing $154.2 million in the United States and Canada from 4,440 theaters and an estimated $140 million from 38 international markets, for a worldwide debut of $294.2 million, the highest in Pixar history before being overtaken by Toy Story 5 in 2026.

In the United States and Canada, the $154.2 million opening weekend was the best of 2024, surpassing Dune: Part Two ($82.5 million) and Godzilla x Kong: The New Empire ($80 million) to become the first film of the year to open above $100 million, and the third-best for an animated film behind Pixar's own Incredibles 2 (2018; $182.7 million) and Disney's The Lion King (2019; $191.7 million). It was also the fourth-best opening for a PG film after The Lion King, Incredibles 2, and Beauty and the Beast ($174 million). With an average ticket price of $12.53 overall and $10.36 for children, twelve million moviegoers saw the film in its first weekend, nearing the thirteen million admissions for Barbie (2023) in its first three days. It played strongly throughout the day (22% of viewers attended before 1 pm, 35% between 1 pm and 5 pm, 26% between 5 pm and 8 pm, and 17% after 8 pm), benefiting from substantial walk-up business credited to its multi-cultural pull (of the opening weekend audience, 36% identified as Hispanic and Latino). IMAX and Premium Large Formats (PLFs) accounted for 43% of the earnings, while 14% came from 3D showings. The film found momentum during the weekday, bringing its seven-day total to $255.2 million and reaching multiple box-office milestones, including the second-highest-grossing first Monday for a Pixar film (at $22.4 million), the highest-grossing first Tuesday for an animated film (at $28.8 million), the third highest non-opening Wednesday after Star Wars: The Force Awakens (2015; $38 million) and Star Wars: The Rise of Skywalker (2019; $32.2 million) that doubled as a record for the Juneteenth federal holiday since it began in 2021 (at $30.1 million), and the highest-grossing first Thursday for a Pixar film (at $19.6 million).

The film made $101.2 million in its second weekend, a mere 34.4% drop to become the most profitable second weekend for an animated film, topping the $92.3 million earned by The Super Mario Bros. Movie (2023), and the seventh-best second weekend overall. Deadline Hollywood's Anthony D'Alessandro attributed the feat to heat waves and rainstorms prompting people to visit air-conditioned theaters. During its third weekend, it beat newcomer A Quiet Place: Day One to remain at the top of the box office with $57.5 million. On the Fourth of July, it crossed $500 million domestically, and during its fourth weekend, the film made $30.3 million, finishing in second behind Despicable Me 4.

Worldwide, the film surpassed the gross of its predecessor ($858.8 million) on June 27, 2024, after sixteen days of release. On June 30, 2024, it crossed the $1 billion threshold, becoming the first Disney animated film to do so since Frozen II in 2019. With this, Inside Out 2 equalled the record of The Lion King as the fastest animated film to cross $1 billion, doing so in 19 days. On July 10, 2024, the film surpassed the global box office of Incredibles 2 ($1.242 billion) to become the highest-grossing Pixar film. The film broke various international box office records in Latin America, becoming the highest-grossing film in Brazil, Chile, Colombia, Mexico, and Uruguay. On July 28, 2024, it surpassed Incredibles 2 as the highest domestic grossing animated film of all time. On August 25, 2024, it became the second animated film to gross $1 billion internationally. On September 1, 2024, it surpassed The Lion King to become the highest-grossing animated film of all time and the highest-grossing film released under the Walt Disney Pictures label.

The film remained as the highest grossing animated film until Ne Zha 2, a Chinese animated film, overtook that position in February 2025. The film remained as the highest-grossing American-produced and Disney's highest-grossing animated film of all time, until January 2026, when Zootopia 2 (2025) overtook this position.

=== Critical response ===
The film received positive reviews. (Note: Multiple references:) According to Animation Magazine, most critics praised its color palette, storyline, and the introduction of new emotions, but some expressed dissatisfaction with the predictability of the external plot related to Riley's acceptance by her new hockey team. On the review aggregator website Rotten Tomatoes, 91% of 328 critics' reviews are positive, with an average rating of 7.6/10. The website's consensus reads: "Spicing things up with the wrinkle of teen angst, Inside Out 2 clears the head and warms the heart by living up to its predecessor's emotional intelligence." Metacritic, which uses a weighted average, assigned the film a score of 73 out of 100, based on 59 critics, indicating "generally favorable" reviews. Audiences polled by CinemaScore gave the film an average grade of "A" on an A+ to F scale (the same as the first film), while those surveyed by PostTrak gave the film an average of 4.5 out of 5 stars, with 71% saying they would definitely recommend it.

Moira Macdonald of The Seattle Times awarded the film 3 1/2 stars out of four, commending the voice cast and the film as "a happy head trip, for any age". Robbie Collin of The Daily Telegraph gave the film four stars out of five, praising the animation, metaphors, and wit while saying "the cast-iron ontological brilliance of Docter's original premise bears expansion well". Owen Gleiberman of Variety praised Hawke's performance as Anxiety and the film's emotional impact, calling it "the most poignantly perceptive tale of the conundrums of early adolescence since Eighth Grade". Manhola Dargis, in The New York Times, praised "Pixar's skill for turning ideas into images, some of which actually manage to slip past the safety of its nice worldview with shocks of the sublime." Other positive reviews include The Observer and Empire, while reviews from the BBC and Los Angeles Times were more mixed. Among the mixed reviews, Siddhant Adlakha, writing for IGN, found the film was "surprising and disappointing in equal measure". David Ehrlich of IndieWire gave the film a 'C–' rating, writing that the film "so perfectly ticks Pixar's boxes in a way that forces the sincerity of its storytelling into a losing battle with the cynicism of its existence".

Various reviewers, including Cindy White for AV Club, unfavorably compared the film to its predecessor and the new characters received a diverse appraisal. Anxiety was the new emotion attracting most attention, for example from Alison Willmore in Vulture or Jordan Hoffman for Entertainment Weekly, while Peter Bradshaw in The Guardian and Odie Henderson in the Boston Globe particularly praised the character of Ennui, voiced by Adèle Exarchopoulos. In his review for NPR, Justin Chang analysed the nostalgia at work in the film but, precisely, criticised the retro sequence based on cartoon images.

Robert Daniels, in his review on RogerEbert.com, felt that the film effectively used Anxiety to transform Riley into a blank character, while Joy and other emotions navigate her mind. For Daniels, this structure allowed the film to blend visually stunning scenes with a whimsical style that is both gentle and entertaining, addressing the pressures faced by teenage girls. Daniels noted that the new emotions introduced were not as memorable as the main emotions.

Writing for Deadline, Damon Wise, however, was rather negative about the film and concluded, "Battle-weary parents of surly teens will have some fun here and there, especially when Ennui's blasé influence opens up a 'sar-chasm' in Riley's brain that makes everything sound, well, sarcastic. But, when all's said and done, the stakes are so minor, it's hard to imagine anyone will leave this desperate to see an Inside Out 3."

=== Accolades ===
At the 97th Academy Awards, Inside Out 2 received nominations for Best Animated Feature. The film is also nominated for BAFTA Award for Best Animated Film, Critics' Choice Movie Award for Best Animated Feature, and Golden Globe Award for Best Animated Feature Film. At the 52nd Annie Awards, the movie received seven nominations, including Best Animated Feature.

== Possible sequel ==
Following the success of Inside Out 2, co-writer Dave Holstein revealed that discussions on at least one more potential sequel, Inside Out 3, were taking place at Pixar.

== See also ==
- List of films about ice hockey
