= Blaze and the Monster Machines =

Animated interactive children's television series

- Genre: Adventure; Comedy
- Created by: Jeff Borkin; Ellen Martin
- Developed by: Clark Stubbs; Jeff Borkin; Ellen Martin
- Directed by: Miguel Martinez-Joffre
- Voices of: Nolan North; Dusan Brown; Caleel Harris; Ramone Hamilton; Jakari Fraser; Ayden Elijah; Angelina Wahler; Molly Jackson; Luna Bella Zamora; Kensington Tallman; Micaiah Chen; Kevin Michael Richardson; Nat Faxon; Alexander Polinsky; James Patrick Stuart; Sunil Malhotra; Kate Higgins; Melanie Minichino; Julieta Cortez
- Opening theme: "Blaze and the Monster Machines Theme", performed by Kyle Gordon, Mason Rather and JP Rende
- Ending theme: "It's Blaze", performed by Scott Krippayne
- Countries of origin: United States; Canada
- Original language: English
- No. of seasons: 9
- No. of episodes: 180 (list of episodes)

Production
- Executive producers: Jeff Borkin; Ellen Martin
- Producers: Tina Chow (2014–2016); Logan McPherson (2014–2016); Sarah Wall (2016–2018); Paddy Kelly (2016–2017); Jennifer DeMichelis (2017–2022); Nisa Contreras (2018–2020); Erin Twine (2022–2025)
- Running time: 22 minutes 44 minutes (specials)
- Production companies: Nerd Corps Entertainment (season 1); WildBrain Studios (seasons 2–9) (Note: Known as DHX Media Vancouver for seasons 2–5.); Nickelodeon Animation Studio

Original release
- Network: Nickelodeon
- Release: October 13, 2014 – December 1, 2025

Blaze and the Monster Machines is an animated children's television series. It premiered on Nickelodeon on October 13, 2014. The show revolves around Blaze, a monster truck, and his human driver, AJ, as they have adventures in Axle City and learn about various STEM concepts that help them on their way. Joining them is the human mechanic, Gabby and their monster truck friends: Stripes, Starla, Darington, and Zeg, as well as their rival Crusher and his goofy sidekick Pickle. Watts and Blaze's sister, Sparkle, join the main cast in Seasons 3 and 7.

Blaze and the Monster Machines ended its run on December 1, 2025, after nine seasons, 180 episodes, and 11 years of airing.

== Plot ==
The show focuses on Blaze, an orange-red monster truck, and his smart, young driver, AJ. They live in a world that is inhabited by sentient monster trucks called "Monster Machines", including primary characters Starla, Stripes, Zeg, Darington, Watts (as of Season 3), and Blaze's sister Sparkle (as of Season 7). Among the cast is Gabby, a talented mechanic who later befriends Watts and becomes her driver. Each episode also features Crusher, a sneaky blue tractor-trailer who cheats in races, but slowly evolves into a nicer character. Crusher is always accompanied by his comic relief sidekick, Pickle.

== Format ==
Each episode has Blaze and AJ go on various adventures and solve problems along the way, normally three per episode, with "assistance" from the viewing audience. Blaze might also transform into a different vehicle or artifact depending on the situation. Blaze may sometimes get a task done with the help of his special power, "Blazing Speed", which is usually used in the climax of an episode and is initiated by shouting "Let's Blaze!". In some episodes, Blaze, AJ and their friends race against Crusher. During the race, Crusher cheats, usually with the help of his gray robot parts. However, Blaze and AJ manage to get through his traps, and they always beat him in time. Not all episodes involve a proper race, but still have Blaze competing against Crusher, sometimes by racing against him to get an item. Other episodes involve helping a friend such as Starla, Zeg, Darington, Stripes, Watts, Sparkle, or even Crusher and Pickle. Each episode features two or three original songs, usually performed by Blaze and AJ off-screen, when they are setting off on their adventure or demonstrating the episode's STEM concept.

In many episodes beginning with Season 2, the main plot is alternated with a subplot featuring Crusher and Pickle, which rarely intersects with the main story but is loosely related to it. In the subplot, Crusher is trying to do something, but ends up in a series of mishaps, usually by not listening to Pickle or thinking ahead, and suffers a random joke on his receiving end.

== Episodes ==
Season	Episodes	Originally released	
Season	Episodes	First released	Last released
1	20	October 13, 2014	June 4, 2015
2	20	September 25, 2015	November 19, 2016
3	20	October 10, 2016	February 22, 2018
4	20	March 20, 2018	September 9, 2019
5	20	August 16, 2019	July 23, 2021
6	26	December 18, 2020	December 9, 2022
7	26	September 14, 2022	April 3, 2024
8	13 (Note: The second half of the season was split into a ninth season, bringing the number of episodes to 13.)	April 4, 2024	February 5, 2025
9	15	February 6, 2025	December 1, 2025

== Characters ==
=== Main ===
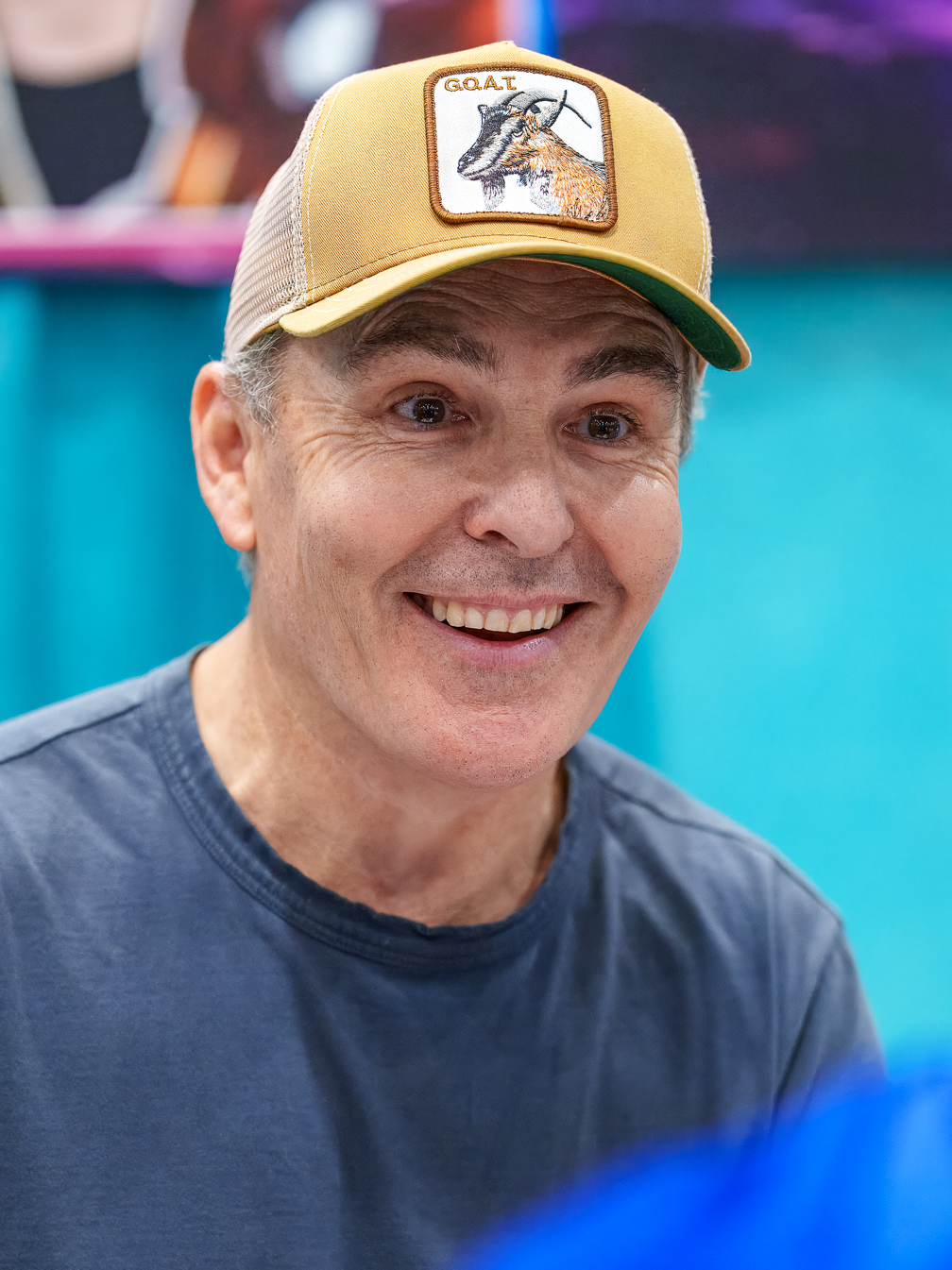
Nolan North, pictured here in 2025, voices the titular character.

==== Blaze ====
Blaze (voiced by Nolan North) is the main host of the series and central character as well as an orange-red monster truck who is good-hearted, loyal, and brave. He is based on the first generation 2010-2014 Ford F-150 SVT Raptor in the form of a trophy truck/pre-runner, judging from the coinciding orange-red color, and has a modified version of the older generation 2004-2008 F-150's grille shaping design, along with a 2007-2013 Chevrolet Silverado's horizontal bar. He is Axle City's number 1 racer, especially with help from his Blazing Speed which is initiated by saying "Let's Blaze!". In Season 1, he uses Blazing Speed exclusively alone. But starting with Season 2, he often shares his power with everyone else so that they can go fast with him. At the beginning of the show, Blaze becomes a Monster Machine racer after winning the Monster Machine World Championships, Season 2 has him join the Axle City Fire Department, Season 3 sees him become King of Animal Island, Season 4 has him join the Axle City Police Department to help Officer Anna, and Season 7 has him join the Renewable Energy Team. In the Season 5 episode "The Blaze Family", Blaze reveals that he has a family: an unnamed mother and father, as well as a younger sister named Sparkle. Blaze and his friends also visit VelocityVille and Animal Island. As revealed in the Season 3 episode "Need for Blazing Speed", Blaze's Blazing Speed engine is not only what he uses to unleash his Blazing Speed, but it is also what allows him to drive around in general. On his tires, he has flame patterns, and on his sides, he has his signature flame decals. A standard F-150 where the SVT Raptor was introduced would be the 12th overall. Despite being supposedly based on the SVT Raptor, Blaze only has one row, when in reality the actual said vehicle always has 2. As a superhero, Blaze gets melting power, strength power, and flying power.

==== AJ ====
AJ (speaking voices by Dusan Brown in Season 1, Caleel Harris in Seasons 1–3, Ramone Hamilton in Seasons 4–6, Jakari Fraser in Seasons 6–8, Ayden Elijah in Seasons 8–9, singing voice by Jacquez Swanigan in Seasons 1–2, Reed L. Shannon in Seasons 2–5, Artyon Celestine in Season 6, Judah Edwards in Season 7, and Leo Abelo Perry in Seasons 7–9) is the show's African-American main co-host and Blaze's human best friend and driver. He is a science and technology expert. Season 7 sees him join the Renewable Energy Team. AJ's racing suit technology includes his Visor View in his helmet which allows him to see things no one else can. When AJ activates his Visor View, the background usually turns orange in Season 1. From Season 2 until Season 9, it doesn't do that anymore. He also has skywriting gloves which allow him to draw pictures in mid-air (which has been abandoned after the events of the Season 4 episode "Ninja Blaze") and a wrist-com video watch worn on his left arm to call others. His uniform can also undergo minor changes in appearance, such as when Blaze transforms into a race car, and when Blaze uses his speed lights. As the show progressed, AJ became the one to describe the STEM concept instead of Blaze in earlier seasons.

==== Crusher ====
Crusher (voiced by Kevin Michael Richardson) is the main antagonist of the series, though he slowly evolves into a nicer character, occasionally serving as an anti-hero. He is a deep blue tractor truck with a lighter blue lightning bolt motif who is Blaze's biggest rival, based on a large 18-wheeler cargo-truck, such as a 2005 Peterbilt 386 and/or 2012 Kenworth T680. He cheats in most episodes because he would get lampooned by Blaze in a fair race. He constructs various cheating gadgets from parts that he keeps in a bag on his chassis. In the episode "Blaze's First Race", it's revealed that Pickle seems to be the one to inspire Crusher's cheating, saying, "But Crusher, pressing the button would be CHEATING," and Crusher saying that he likes the sound of cheating. While he is known for his cheating and mischievous ways, he is not all bad and not really evil. In fact, Crusher is still good at heart at times. The episode "Catch That Cake!" reveals that he has moral limits when it comes to stealing food; he admitted that he would have respected Darington's birthday cake and not taken a piece without permission, despite his temptation. In addition, Blaze and his friends are even willing to help Crusher in some instances, such as helping him find his toy truck Little Trucky in "The Mystery Bandit", In "Gasquatch!," and Gasquatch saving him by sneezing away a thundercloud and bringing him down from the Mud Mountain. Crusher even tried to resist cheating in "Defeat the Cheat" when he was paired with Blaze during the second Team Truck Challenge. In the episode, Crusher (along with Blaze) finally scored his first ever win, and it's also the first time Crusher doesn't show disgust after crashing into something and getting mud or food on him, as shown when he crashes into an ice cream stand while celebrating and upon tasting, he giddily says "Tastes like winning!". Season 7 sees him join the Renewable Energy Team. On his tires, he has lightning bolt patterns.

==== Pickle ====
Pickle (voiced by Nat Faxon) is a small, and green singing hatchback monster truck based on a 1975 AMC Pacer with darker green stripes and bumps on his sides, who is Crusher's sidekick despite Crusher's indifference towards him, although the two are known to be close friends most of the time. In the episode "The Pickle Family Campout", it's revealed that he has a family: 3 cousins Ben, Ken, and Sven, 5 sisters Baby Gherkin, Lilly, Milly, Tilly, and Frilly, and a Grandpa. He tends to look on the brighter side of things, is quite goofy, and has an extremely high pitch voice. Although he is by Crusher's side, Pickle is actually quite friendly towards Blaze and his friends. He took Bump Bumperman's place in "Defeat the Cheat", "Power Tires", and "The Great Pizza Race" when Bump Bumperman was busy with other stuff. Season 7 sees him join the Renewable Energy Team. In the episode "Blaze's First Race", it's revealed that Pickle met Crusher during his first ever race, and he seems to be the one to inspire Crusher's cheating, saying, "But Crusher, pressing the button would be CHEATING", and Crusher saying that he likes the sound of cheating. On his tires, he has wavy line patterns.

==== Gabby ====
Gabby (voiced by Angelina Wahler in Seasons 1–3, Molly Jackson in Seasons 3–5, Luna Bella Zamora in Season 6, Kensington Tallman in Season 7, and Micaiah Chen in Seasons 7–9) is a human mechanic with light skin, blue eyes and purple hair in a ponytail held by a blue hair tie. She wears a white shirt with blue overalls, though she switches to a white-and-blue racing suit and helmet with goggles when either driving her ATV, riding with Blaze (with three exceptions being. In "Epic Sail" where she only wore her helmet when she, Blaze, AJ, Gabby, and Stripes went off to get the sail but later took off her helmet offscreen, "Axle City Grand Prix" when she wore her overalls when Blaze left the garage but later switched to her blue racing suit for the rest of the episode, and "Robots to the Rescue" when she was wearing her magenta racing suit in Blaze's passenger seat when Robot Blaze welcomed his friends to Robot Headquarters), or other unknown reasons. She fixes up the trucks when they are damaged and sometimes rides with AJ and Blaze to take part in some of their adventures and races, with her always doing this in the Special Missions miniseries. Season 7 sees her join the Renewable Energy Team. Gabby's outfit undergoes changes like AJ's uniform and helmet, but it only happens twice. Gabby also drives a purple ATV, but she no longer drives it anymore after "Light Riders", because starting with "Fast Friends", she is now a Monster Machine driver for Watts, but continues to work in the garage. This makes her the second character to become one and to be partnered with a Monster Machine, the first being AJ who partners with Blaze. When Gabby drives Watts, she almost always wears a white and magenta version of her racing suit, and her hair also undergoes some slight changes, such as having her ponytail being held by a magenta hair tie. She also often resembles a pickup truck intended to be a Mercedes X 360.

==== Stripes ====
Stripes (voiced by Sunil Malhotra) is an orange bengal tiger truck with violet stripes and highlights on him, and the design based on multiple generations of a Jeep Wrangler. He has the abilities of a Bengal tiger, such as a high sense of smell and retractable spike-claws in his tires. He is good at jumping and climbing. With a total of 15, Stripes has used Blazing Speed with Blaze the second most times after Starla and Zeg. In "Spark Bug," Stripes and Sparky in trouble from tree rock river. In Season 3's "Wild Wheels" episodes, when Blaze transforms into a Lion Monster Machine, he shares his engineering powers to transform Stripes into a bengal tiger named Super Bengal Tiger Stripes. In "Babysitting Heroes," it reveals that Stripes can babysit baby animals. His home is a treehouse in a jungle outside Axle City. On his tires, he has stripe patterns. In "The Monster Machine Christmas Extravaganza", he is an Axle City Caroler. As a superhero, Stripes has the power of any animal.

==== Starla ====
Starla (voiced by Kate Higgins) is a purple Southern-accented pickup truck based on a lot generic, and more stubbier version of the then-new 4th-generation 2014 GMC Sierra (K2XX), with the same generation Chevrolet Silverado wheel wells, In "Cattle Drive," Blaze, Starla and cows in the river. and a silver cowgirl hat. She is a roping expert. She runs a farm outside Axle City. She's the only female Monster Machine to be a main cast member until "Watts" in Season 3. Out of all the main characters that used Blazing Speed with Blaze (despite not having a Blazing Speed engine), she used it the most times with a total of 16 (tying with Zeg). Season 7 sees her join the Renewable Energy Team. On her tires, she has horseshoe patterns. In "The Monster Machine Christmas Extravaganza", she is an Axle City Caroler. As a superhero, Starla can make any star she wants, like glowing stars, floating stars, and firework stars.

==== Darington ====
Darington (voiced by Alexander Polinsky) is a clumsy yet starry white and blue pickup truck with a gold star motif not based on any known real truck model. He also has a helmet and cape-like spoiler. He loves stunts. In "Darington to the Moon!," Darington from a rocketship in water, wind, and sun. His catchphrase is "Darington!" In "The Chicken Circus", it is revealed that Darington can speak chicken. In "The Amazing Stunt Kitty", it is also revealed that Darington has a kitty cat named Stunt Kitty as his pet and sidekick. On his tires, he has star patterns. In "The Monster Machine Christmas Extravaganza", he is an Axle City Caroler. As a superhero, Darington can grow and shrink in size.

==== Zeg ====
Zeg (voiced by James Patrick Stuart) is a lime green dinosaur truck with ocean blue highlights and brute tendencies based on a Terradyne Gurkha/Armet Gurkha F5. He has a short vocabulary and tends to refer to himself in third person. Like most Ceratopsian dinosaurs, Zeg loves to smash. In "Zeg and the Egg," Egg hatched a baby truckodactyl. In "Zeg and the Egg," Zeg singing to the egg. In "Race to the Top of the World," Zeg reveals that he can't swim (even though he did show to do such thing later on in Five Alarm Blaze). He has a low, Hulk-like voice. His home is a prehistoric cave outside. Just like Starla, he also used Blazing Speed with Blaze the most times with 16 in total. In "Dino Smash!", it's revealed that Zeg has three sisters named Meg, Peg, and Egg. On his tires, he has rock patterns. In "The Monster Machine Christmas Extravaganza", he's an Axle City Caroler. His main catchphrase in multiple episodes is his name itself, "Zeg!". He's the only friend of Blaze to not have a superhero form.

==== Watts ====
Watts (voiced by Melanie Minichino) is a magenta South American-accented monster truck powered by electricity. She is the latest of Blaze's friends based on a 2016 Lamborghini Huracán LP610-4 Spyder with a truck grille and bumper but actually resembles a Jaguar XJ220. She is also the second female Monster Machine to both be part of the main cast and be part of Blaze's Monster Machine friends, with the first one being Starla. Watts' features include her electric engine and her special yellow electric tires, both allowing her to drive faster, and her Electric Charge which allows her to give anything electricity so it can work. When Watts met Blaze, AJ and Gabby for the first time, she happily asks Gabby to be her driver, saying that she never had anyone driving her before. Gabby happily accepts Watts' offer, saying that she has never been a Monster Machine's driver before. Since then, Gabby is now a Monster Machine driver for Watts and the two are now very close friends. This makes Watts the second Monster Machine to be driven by a human and to be partnered with a Monster Machine driver, with the first being Blaze who partners with AJ. Despite this, however, Watts has spent a few episodes without Gabby and also completed in one race without her, unlike Blaze who always appears with AJ. On her tires, she has lightning bolt patterns just like Crusher, though hers have a different design. In "The Monster Machine Christmas Extravaganza", she is an Axle City Caroler. She is also the only main character with colored tires. As a superhero, Watts can make and ride on lightning bolts.

==== Sparkle ====
Sparkle (voiced by Julieta Cortez) is Blaze's younger sister. She originally debuted as a guest character in the fifth and sixth seasons, but made periodic appearances in the next few seasons. She is based on the same type of Ford Raptor just like him. She has hot pink hair that has pigtails with yellow stars holding them in every place. Her eyes have glittery pink eyeliner and eyelashes. She has a finish of sparkles on her tires, which has the same print as her brother. Sparkle's sides bear a smaller version of Blaze's flame symbol. In "The Blaze Family," Blaze, Phoenix, Sparkle and Flame block the track broken from swing across. Sparkle is very playful and enjoys her brother's company greatly. She also prefers fair play over cheating, putting her at odds over Crusher. Just like Blaze, Sparkle has the ability to transform into other vehicles to perform different tasks. When transforming, Sparkle retains her hair and the flame symbol, but sometimes the flame symbol takes on other guises. Like Blaze too, Sparkle has a Blazing Speed engine as well. But Sparkle's have a pink and yellow contrail similar to Blaze's. In the episode "Super Wheels vs. The Bubblemaker", Sparkle reveals that she has a dinosaur. As said above, her appearances and interaction with the viewer is one of the few aspects in hinting that Sparkle may be a second introduction of a new main character in the series after Watts. This was especially evident in "Sparkle's Big Rescue", where she took both her brother and AJ's places as the main protagonist of the episode after Crusher sent them away with the Bye-Bye Copter. As a superhero, Sparkle can make anything made of glitter.

=== Recurring ===
- Bump Bumperman (voiced by Jeff Bennett) is a truck with a design inspired by Sheriff Woody from Toy Story who announces all the races and events, with four exceptions being "Defeat the Cheat", "Power Tires", "The Great Pizza Race", and "Video Game Land: A Monster Machine Super Special" with Pickle taking his place in "Defeat the Cheat", "Power Tires", and "The Great Pizza Race" and Joe and Gus taking his place in "Video Game Land: A Monster Machine Super Special".
- Animals, Crusher's Inventions (voiced by Dee Bradley Baker) (in many episodes, Inventions are voiced by Cristina Vee Valenzuela)
- Joe (voiced by Nat Faxon) is Gus' best friend. Based on the same generation GMC Sierra like Starla, but male. He, along with Gus, took Bump Bumperman's place in "Video Game Land: A Monster Machine Super Special" when Bump Bumperman was busy with other stuff.
- Gus (voiced by Kevin Michael Richardson) is Joe's best friend. He, along with Joe, took Bump Bumperman's place in "Video Game Land: A Monster Machine Super Special" when Bump Bumperman was busy with other stuff. He is a Ford E-Series van/pickup conversion.
- Gasquatch (voiced by Fred Tatasciore) is a mud-loving truck.
- Swoops (voiced by David Shatraw) is a large green helicopter with a grille and bumper. He wears a yellow hat.
- Speedrick (voiced by Keith Ferguson) is a snooty race car, and is the main antagonist of Race Car Superstar.
- Becky Checkerflag (voiced by Grey DeLisle)
- Snout the Warthog (voiced by Ian James Corlett)
- Wartimer the Warthog (voiced by Trevor Devall)
- Bunk the African Elephant (voiced by Jess Harnell)
- Bam the Western-Lowland Gorilla (voiced by Sirena Irwin)
- Skyler the Brown Falcon (voiced by Kate Higgins)
- Nelson the Black Rhinoceros (voiced by Cedric Yarbrough)
- Burt Black'n'White (voiced by Eric Morgan Stuart)
- Paulina (voiced by Nika Futterman)
- Paulie and Ollie (voiced by Evan Agos)
- Petey (voiced by Connor Andrade)
- Peggy (voiced by Juliet Donenfeld)
- Jimmy (voiced by Michael Jordan)
- Annie (voiced by Emma Sloan Jacobs)
- Kimmy and Ellie (both voiced by Destiny Ochoa)
- Floppy (voiced by Charlie Townsend)
- Singer #1 (voiced by Scott Krippayne)
- Singer #2 (voiced by Tommy Leonard)
- Singer #3 (voiced by Seann Bowe)
- Singer #4 (voiced by Matthew Tishler)

=== Minor ===
- Reece (voiced by Kate Higgins) is a green female garbage truck. The name is made of creativity, alluding to the fact that it means "recycling". She is cab-forward like Mordo and Triton. On her tires, she has garbage can patterns.
- Debris (voiced by James Patrick Stuart) is a white French-accented garbage truck with a red dump bed. He is cab-forward like Mordo and Triton. His catchphrase is "Now that's what I call a cleanup!"
- Clive (voiced by Kevin Michael Richardson) is the town baker of Axle City.
- Rudy (voiced by Jeff Bennett) is Crusher's teammate. Based on a Hummer H2 SUT converted to a 2-door single cab with Starla's grille and wheel wells.
- Ferris (voiced by Jeff Bennett) is a chopped roof tow truck. In the Season 1 episode "The Mystery Bandit", at the very ending scene, it turns out to be that he was actually the one who took the lost items. Yet once again based on a GMC Sierra.
- The King (voiced by Charlie Adler)
- The Royal Knights
  - Green Knight and Yellow Knight (both voiced by Jeff Bennett)
  - Purple Knight (voiced by Cree Summer)
  - White Knight (voiced by Charlie Adler)
- The Moose Family
  - Morgan Moose (voiced by Mick Wingert)
  - Marty Moose (voiced by Jim Cummings)
  - Bruce Moose (voiced by Jess Harnell)
- The Carnival Barker (voiced by Mick Lauer)
- Lucy (voiced by Grey DeLisle Griffin)
- Brodie (voiced by Kate Higgins)
- Robbie (voiced by Charlie Adler)
- Little Girl (voiced by Cate Gragnani)
- Little Boy (voiced by Jack Fisher)
- Littlest Girl (voiced by Destiny Ochoa)
- Dance Truck 1 (voiced by James Patrick Stuart)
- Dispatch (voiced by Nolan North)
- Traffic Trucks (all voiced by Kevin Michael Richardson, Jeff Bennett, Kate Higgins and Nat Faxon)
- The Animals
- The Monkey (voiced by Amber Hood)
- The Bunny (voiced by Hynden Walch)
- Bunny #2 and The Giant Panda (voiced by Stephanie Sheh)
- The Frog (voiced by Nolan North)
- The Sneaky Red Fox (voiced by Tara Strong)
- Blaze and Sparkle's Dad (speaking voice by Jess Harnell and singing voice by James Richard) is one of Blaze and Sparkle's Mom's husband
- Blaze and Sparkle's Mom (voiced by April Stewart) is a six-wheeler monster truck and she's one of Blaze and Sparkle's Dad's wife.
- Snowbie (voiced by Becky Robinson)
- The Sea Star (voiced by Cristina Vee Valenzuela)
- The Swordfish (voiced by Kevin Michael Richardson)
- The Turtle (voiced by Nolan North)
- Shark Flowers and Biggest Shark Flower (both voiced by Abby Trott)
- Crab #3 (voiced by Nika Futterman)
- The Dolphin/Crab #1 (voiced by Kate Higgins)
- Crab #2/The Crab Announcer (voiced by Fred Tatasciore)
- Zuzu (voiced by Debi Derryberry)
- Oola (voiced by Kaitlyn Robrock)
- Zork/The Alien Announcer (voiced by Sean Kenin)
- The Kissing Bear (voiced by Dee Bradley Baker)

=== Special guest stars ===
- Grammy (voiced by Susan Silo) is Crusher's grandma. Based on a 1950 GMC MH5900 Flatbed (970).
- The Fire Chief (voiced by Joe Manganiello)
- Pegwheel the Peg-Leg Pirate (voiced by Anthony Anderson). Based on a Ford Model T.
- The Great Sphinx (voiced by Mayim Bialik) is a sphinx that only appeared in Race to the Top of the World. Whenever she appears, Darington gets easily scared. Based on a Jaguar XJ220.
- Santa Claus (voiced by Bob Joles) is the 3rd human character based on the original real-life human/person of the same name.
- The Voice of Christmas (voiced by Carl Reiner)
- Rally (voiced by Danica Patrick)
- Fender (voiced by Kasey Kahne)
- Dash (voiced by Jimmie Johnson)
- Mark Setgo (voiced by Chase Elliott)
- The Light Thief (voiced by Melissa Rauch) is a red kangaroo.
- Lazard the Common Chameleon (voiced by Billy Ray Cyrus)
- Tooks the Toco Toucan (voiced by Kelsea Ballerini)
- Thunderwing the Brown Falcon (voiced by Darius Rucker)
- The Pickle Family
  - Cousin Ben (voiced by Steve Little)
  - Cousins Ken and Sven (voiced by Chris Parnell)
  - Sister Lilly and Baby Gherkin (voiced by Judy Greer)
  - Sisters Milly and Frilly (voiced by Wendi McLendon-Covey)
  - Sister Tilly (voiced by Stephanie Courtney)
  - Grandpa (voiced by Jim Rash)
- The Little Bunny (voiced by Jenna Dewan)
- Commander Megan (voiced by K. Megan McArthur) is the 4th human character played by herself in the episode Robots in Space.
- Blackbelt, the Ninja Master (voiced by DJ Khaled in "Ninja Blaze", Dempsey Pappion in "Ninja Soup") is a purple and yellow ninja truck. On his tires, he has ninja star patterns.
- Officer Anna (voiced by Nia Long) is a police truck based on a Ferrari LaFerrari.
- Roarian (voiced by Regi Davis)
- The Genie (voiced by Justin Guarini)
- Grandma Ninja (voiced by Jo Marie Payton)
- The Treat Thief (voiced by Georgie Kidder)
- Wheelie Jean King (voiced by Billie Jean King)
- Swift Paul (voiced by Chris Paul)
- Abby Wamtruck (voiced by Abby Wambach)
- The Litter Critter (voiced by "Weird Al" Yankovic)
- Queen Fastine (voiced by Sherri Shepherd)
- Lord Carburetor (voiced by Richard Kind) is a GMC Sierra with a hat, mustache and beard.
- Gas Guzzler (voiced by Nicole Byer) is a sneaky female guzzler truck, who, during the race, took Blaze, Pickle, Starla, and Crusher's gas. At the end, she redeems herself and becomes the leader of the Renewable Energy Team.
- The Yucky Ducky (voiced by Amy Sedaris)
- The Green Queen (voiced by Kathy Najimy)
- The Baby Robot (voiced by Doug Lawrence) Baby Robot's babies
- The Movie Narrator (voiced by John O'Hurley) Movies

== Locations ==
- Axle City is the main location of the series and where Blaze, AJ, Gabby, and all of the rest of the Monster Machines live. The most well-known locations of the area include the Monster Dome, Mud Mountain, a land of Medieval Monster Machines, and much more, including nearby islands. Monster Machines race events include Stuntmania, the Axle City Grand Prix and the Race to the Top of the World. Monster Machine friends, both in Axle City and other areas of the Monster Machine world, include the Great Sphinx, Pegwheel Pete and his Pirate Crew, Bump Bumperman, Joe and Gus, Gasquatch, the Light Thief (a kangaroo), the Litter Critter (a raccoon), and the Treat Thief (a mouse).
- VelocityVille is the location for the "Race Car Adventures" episodes. To reach VelocityVille, Blaze and his friends travel to it with help from their friend, Swoops, whom Blaze and AJ first met before he offers them a ride on their very first visit to VelocityVille. Where Axle City is inhabited by Monster Machines, VelocityVille's inhabitants are Race Cars. This is where Blaze transformed into a Race Car for first time to save his new friends of Velocityville and since then, he, his Monster Machine friends and even Crusher and Pickle transform into Race Cars whenever they visit VelocityVille. As a result of the Race Car Transformation, AJ's racing suit also undergoes some slight changes, such as his racing helmet having white detailing instead of black. Blaze, AJ, Gabby and the other Monster Machine's Race Car friends include Rally, Fender, Dash, Mark-Set-Go and other Velocityville residents like Becky Checkerflag and Speedrick (formerly a rival who wants no one to be faster than him, but now a friend who believes that all race cars, including him, should be fast). In VelocityVille, Race Cars happily drive around the city at incredible speed and velocity thanks to their aerodynamic shapes, and Race Car events take place, such as the Race to Eagle Rock, the Polar Derby and the Hundred Mile Race.
- Animal Island is a location in the Monster Machines' World where animals of all kinds reside, including insects. Animal Island is also the location for the "Wild Wheels" episodes. Unlike the animals in Axle City and VelocityVille, all of the animals in Animal Island are capable to talk like humans and Monster Machines, in addition to their usual animal noises. The main residents of the island and Blaze, AJ, Gabby and the Monster Machines' animal friends include Bunk the Elephant, Bam the Gorilla, Skyler the Falcon, Nelson the Rhino, and Tooks the Toucan. Blaze and his friends travel to Animal Island by raft or Swoops. When Blaze and his friends visit Animal Island, instead of STEM Concepts, the "Wild Wheels" episodes teach viewers educational facts about all kinds of Animals.

== Miniseries ==
=== Race Car Adventures ===
Race Car Adventures is the name for six special episodes of Seasons 2 and 3. The first episode aired on May 30, 2016. The last episode aired on December 9, 2016. In these special episodes, Blaze and AJ visit a city called VelocityVille, a town populated entirely by race cars instead of monster trucks. Whenever Blaze goes there, he transforms into a race car so he can go fast like they do. The STEM concepts featured in these episodes are special and allude to race cars and what they do.

The theme song is changed for these episodes. As in the original, it begins with Blaze's flame sticker appearing and glowing over a black screen before zooming out to frame all of him in Swoops. During "On your mark", Blaze jumps through a virtual blueprint out of Swoops into VelocityVille, transforming into his race car form. He deploys Blazing Speed and sets off. During "So buckle your seatbelt", Rally, Dash and Fender race behind him as they drive around and AJ gives him speed. Those were both taken from a scene in "Race Car Superstar". At "Gimme, gimme, gimme some speed", Blaze jumps off a ramp and he lands by Starla, Stripes, Zeg and Darington, also transformed, as they race together. At the second "Blaze and the Monster Machines (Go, Go!) (Blaze!)", they zoom past Crusher and Pickle, also transformed, the former looking shocked while the latter is impressed. Finally, they jump a hill and Blaze lands front and center, and the logo fades in behind him as he slides offscreen forward. Race car sound effects were added to fit the miniseries' title.

=== Wild Wheels ===
Wild Wheels is the name for six special episodes of Season 3. The first episode aired on May 29, 2017. The last episode aired on October 26, 2017. These special episodes also marked the debut of the show's new animation style. In these special episodes, Blaze and AJ visit a special place called Animal Island, an island inhabited by talking animal trucks who befriend them. Unlike other episodes, these episodes do not have STEM concepts, and instead focus on different animals and certain facts about what they do. Transformations in these episodes are also animal-like, and Blaze and his friends will often turn into an animal to solve the problem at hand.

Like the Race Car Adventures episodes, a unique title sequence is used. Like the original, Blaze's flame glows over black; at "On your mark", the view zooms out to frame him racing across the Animal Island savannah, passing Bunk then Nelson. At "One, two, three, Let's Blaze", He drives with Stripes in the jungle and they jump and transform into a lion and Super Tiger Stripes, respectively. At "So buckle your seatbelt", they jump through the forest, then Blaze jumps up and turns into a gorilla as he swings across the trees. At "Gimmie, gimmie, gimmie some speed", he then transforms into a rhinoceros and charges forward, smashing through a wall in his path. At "Blaze and the Monster Machines (Go, go!) (Blaze!)" He transforms into a shark and jumps into the ocean, swimming around. As he jumps out, he transforms into a falcon and flies around the Animal Island lagoon. Finally he flies past the camera and the theme song ends on the show's logo. The theme song only added whooshing sounds and the first version had a coloring error: Blaze's lion eyes are bright blue. Later episodes corrected this.

=== Robot Riders ===
Robot Riders is the name for nine special episodes of Seasons 4, 7 and 9. The first episode aired on May 28, 2018. The last episode aired on September 17, 2025. These special episodes are unique as they do not take place in a special themed location like VelocityVille from Race Car Adventures and Animal Island from Wild Wheels. Instead, these episodes take place in and around Axle City like the original. Hence the title, every episode has Blaze transform into a super strong robot, as the problem at hand is too tough for a regular Monster Machine to solve. As a robot, Blaze gains robot power and can smash stuff and jump super high. AJ can also code a sequence for him to follow, which happens once every episode.

Like the previous special episodes, a unique title sequence is used. It starts with Blaze's flame glowing over black like the original, before zooming out to frame him driving on a blue grid. He jumps at the robot model and transforms, then jumps up. At "So buckle your seatbelt", he lands in Axle City and passes some trucks and Joe and Gus, before sliding down a metal pipe. At "When Blaze goes saving the day", boxes break off a crane and fall in the direction of two other trucks, so Blaze jumps up and kicks them away. At "Gimmie, gimmie, gimmie some speed", he swings across wrecking balls and swings around a pole. At "Blaze and the Monster Machines (Go, go!) (Blaze!)", he lands in the middle of Crusher and Pickle's picnic, and runs off as Pickle waves and Crusher looks shocked. At the second "Blaze and the Monster Machines (Go, go!) (Blaze!)", Blaze, Stripes and Watts do tricks at the skating rink, the latter two transformed into robots. Finally, Blaze, Stripes, Starla, Darington, Zeg and Watts run through Axle City, the latter three also transformed, and they jump at the camera and the theme song ends on the show's logo. The intro also added whooshing sound effects and computerized beeping.

=== Special Missions ===
Special Missions is the name for four special episodes of Seasons 6 and 7. The first episode aired on February 25, 2022. The last episode aired on April 21, 2023. These episodes include a narrator in each episode (like Monster Machine Christmas). Like Robot Riders, the Special Missions episodes take place in and around Axle City. At the beginning, and at the end. Blaze encounters an antagonist, and the problem he's facing is a rather large one. So he becomes Special Mission Blaze. With Blaze turning himself into Special Mission Blaze, he gets three epic Special Mission modes. He uses all three throughout the episode since he faces three problems. At the end of each episode, the antagonist usually gets upset because Special Mission Blaze was able to stop them, and then Blaze, AJ, and Gabby all together give the antagonist a small talk on what they're doing, and how it's wrong, and how doing the opposite could be beneficial for them. At the end, the antagonist then changes their ways.

Like the previous special episodes, a unique title sequence is used.

=== Super Wheels ===
Super Wheels is the name for four special episodes of Seasons 6 and 7. The first episode aired on September 13, 2022. The last episode aired on September 25, 2023. Similar to Special Missions, the Super Wheels episodes include a narrator in the start of each episode. Also, like both Robot Riders and Special Missions, the Super Wheels episodes take place in and around Axle City. In these episodes, a very powerful flying supervillain comes to cause damage to the city using their superpowers, so Blaze, AJ, and one or two of their friends use the power of Super Wheels to transform into superheroes to save the day.

Like the previous special episodes, a unique title sequence is used. At the beginning, Blaze and AJ are shown in Axle City with their superhero looks with the camera rotating around them. On “So buckle your seatbelt”, Blaze flies through the air and uses his wheels to melt a giant snowball. On the second “Blaze and the Monster Machines (Super Wheels!) (Blaze!)”, Blaze passes by Stripes, Darington, Starla, Watts and Zeg. On the third “Blaze and the Monster Machines (Super Wheels!) (Blaze!)”, Crusher and Pickle are about to get hit by falling boxes and Blaze uses his super strength to lift them up. Then Blaze flies to the right and the show’s logo appears. The theme song is also slower than the other versions and has a heroic instrumental to fit the superhero theme. The title sequence was updated in "Super Wheels vs. The Bubblemaker", with Blaze and AJ's superhero looks becoming blue, Sparkle taking Zeg's place, and Stripes, Darington, Starla, Watts and Sparkle receiving their own superhero looks.

== Production ==
The first five seasons consist of 20 episodes. On June 15, 2015, the series was renewed for a third season which premiered on October 10, 2016. On June 21, 2017, it was renewed for a fourth season which premiered on March 20, 2018. On May 22, 2018, it was renewed for a fifth season which premiered on August 16, 2019. On February 19, 2020, the series was renewed for a sixth season which premiered on December 18, 2020. On August 9, 2021, Charlie Adler, the voice director for the series, confirmed that the series was renewed for a seventh season, which was confirmed to have 26 episodes.

In October 2025, it was revealed that the second half of season 8 was split into a ninth season, bringing the number of episodes for the former to 13.

In late 2025, it was announced that the series would end production after the end of the ninth season.

== Broadcast ==
Blaze and the Monster Machines premiered on Nick Jr. in the United Kingdom and Ireland on March 6, 2015 and on Nick Jr. in Australia and New Zealand on March 9. The series is also airing on Nickelodeon and Treehouse TV in Canada and Nick Jr. in Africa. It premiered on Nicktoons in the United Kingdom along with Ryan's Mystery Playdate on 6 January 2020.

=== Mobile streaming ===
On August 31, 2017, the first two seasons and the first half of the third season were added to the Noggin app.

== DVD releases ==
Blaze and the Monster Machines DVD releases are distributed by Paramount Home Entertainment under the Nickelodeon label.

Title	Region 1	Episodes
Blaze of Glory: A Mini Movie	February 17, 2015	"Blaze of Glory" & "The Driving Force"
High-Speed Adventures	August 11, 2015	"The Bouncy Tires", "Stuntmania!", "Epic Sail" & "The Team Truck Challenge"
Rev Up and Roar	February 16, 2016	"Zeg and the Egg", "Dino Dash", "Gasquatch!" & "Dragon Island Duel"
Fired Up!	July 12, 2016	"Fired Up!", "Five Alarm Blaze", "Trouble at the Truck Wash" & "Sneezing Cold"
Race Into VelocityVille	February 14, 2017	"Race Car Superstar", "Race to Eagle Rock", "Sky Track", "The Wishing Wheel", "The Hundred Mile Race" & "The Polar Derby"
Wild Wheels: Escape to Animal Island	September 19, 2017	"Animal Island", "Toucan Do It!", "The Big Ant-venture" & "Falcon Quest"
Heroes of Axle City	February 13, 2018	"Tow Truck Tough", "Light Riders", "Rocket Ski Rescue" & "Race to the Top of the World"
Blaze Saves Christmas	November 6, 2018	"Monster Machine Christmas", "Breaking the Ice", "Catch That Cake!" & "Ninja Blaze"
Robot Riders	February 5, 2019	"Robots to the Rescue", "T-Rex Trouble", "Meatball Mayhem" & "Robots in Space"
Ninja Blaze	August 27, 2019	"Ninja Blaze", "Ninja Soup", "Pickle Power", "Defeat the Cheat" & "The Super-Size Prize"
Knight Riders	February 11, 2020	"Knight Riders", "Knighty Knights", "Royal Rescue" & "The Flying Lion"
Race for the Golden Treasure	July 28, 2020	"Race for the Golden Treasure", "Treasure Track", "The Island of Lost Treasure" & "The Wishing Wheel"
Axle City Grand Prix	February 2, 2021	"Axle City Grand Prix", "The Bouncing Bull Racetrack", "Deep Sea Grand Prix" & "Raceday Rescue"
The Case of the Treat Thief	July 27, 2021	"The Treat Thief", "Blazing Amazing Stories", "Toy Trouble!" & "Officer Blaze"
Dino Derby	February 1, 2022	"Dino Derby", "Dinosaur Parade", "Dinocoaster" & "Dino Dash"
Big Rig to the Rescue!	October 4, 2022	"Big Rig to the Rescue!", "Big Rig Blaze", "Big Rig: Dolphin Delivery" & "The Big Balloon Rescue"

== Video game ==
In 2021, Outright Games released a racing game, Blaze and the Monster Machines: Axle City Racers on Nintendo Switch, PlayStation 4, Windows, Xbox One and Xbox Series X/S.
