= List of Blaze and the Monster Machines episodes =

Blaze and the Monster Machines is a CGI-animated, computer-animated, interactive children's television series with a focus on teaching STEM (science, technology, engineering and mathematics). It premiered on Nickelodeon on October 13, 2014, and ended its run on December 1, 2025, after nine seasons, 180 episodes, and 11 years of airing.

The series revolves around Blaze, a monster truck, and his driver, AJ, as they have adventures in Axle City and learn about various STEM concepts which help them on their way. Joining them is the mechanic Gabby and their monster truck friends Stripes, Starla, Darington, and Zeg as well as their rival Crusher and his goofy sidekick Pickle. Later, Watts and Sparkle join the main cast in Seasons 3 and 7.

== Series overview ==
Season	Episodes	Originally released	
Season	Episodes	First released	Last released
1	20	October 13, 2014	June 4, 2015
2	20	September 25, 2015	November 18, 2016
3	20	October 10, 2016	February 22, 2018
4	20	March 26, 2018	September 9, 2019
5	20	August 16, 2019	July 23, 2021
6	26	December 18, 2020	December 9, 2022
7	26	September 14, 2022	April 3, 2024
8	13 (Note: The second half of the season was split into a ninth season, bringing the number of episodes to 13.)	April 4, 2024	February 5, 2025
9	15	February 6, 2025	December 1, 2025

== Episodes ==
Miguel Martinez-Joffre serves as the director of the series, though episodes are directed by different people.

=== Season 1 (2014–15) ===
No. overall	No. in season	Title	Directed by	Written by	Original release date	Prod. code	U.S. viewers (millions)
1	1	"Blaze of Glory"	Dustin McKenzie & Shane Poettcker	Clark Stubbs	October 13, 2014	101-102 (999)	N/A
2	2	"Blaze of Glory"	Dustin McKenzie & Shane Poettcker	Clark Stubbs	October 13, 2014	101-102 (999)	N/A
Blaze and his driver AJ are introduced to the world of Monster Machines when they discover a city named Axle City after getting diverted by falling rocks. But when a mean racer named Crusher sends Blaze and the other Monster Machines far away thanks to his Trouble Bubble Wand (meaning that Crusher is cheating to win the race), it's up to the viewers at home to help Blaze and AJ find the Monster Machines (their new friends) and get back to the race just in time using Blaze's Blazing Speed before Crusher wins and gets the Monster Machine World Championships trophy. STEM Concept: Buoyancy Songs: "Let's Blaze", "Buoyancy", "Monster Machine Friends", "It's Blaze" Transformation: Sprinkler Crusher Cheats: Trouble Bubble Wand, Mechanical Mud Slinger, Robot Knights Introduction in order: Blaze, AJ, Gabby, Stripes, Starla, Darington, Zeg, Crusher, and Pickle Blaze and his friends in order: Tangled in vines (Stripes), Getting chased by Grizzlies (Darington), Rolling in a giant snowball (Zeg), Stuck in a hole in the cave (Starla)
3	3	"The Driving Force"	Daniel Ife	Jeff Borkin	October 20, 2014	103	1.16
After a race, Starla, the friendly cowgirl Monster Machine, loses one of her pistons in the mud pit. Blaze and AJ need your help to get it back, but they'll have to hurry before Crusher gets his greedy tires on it! STEM Concept: Force Songs: "Let's Blaze", "Force" Transformation: Wrecking Crane Appointment: Piston missing (Starla) Crusher Cheats: Bigfoot Robot, Giant Pineapple Blaster Note: This is the first episode to follow the usual standard episode format, meaning it lasts over the usual 30-minute length.
4	4	"Tool Duel"	Mike Fetterly & Robin Shea	Dustin Ferrer	October 21, 2014	104	N/A
Gabby has a big box of tools that she can use when she needs to fix anything, but when Crusher steals the toolbox for himself, Blaze and AJ need your help to get it back so Gabby can use it to fix their Monster Machine friends, especially including Crusher, who has busted his exhaust pipe. STEM Concept: Friction Songs: "Hit the Road", "Friction" Transformation: Hydrofoil Crusher Cheats: Slippery Banana Launcher, Chomping Shark-Bot Appointments: Rubber ducky stuck in transmission (Blaze), broken bumper after slipping while climbing (Stripes), windshield fluid squirting away from the windshield wipers (Zeg), only driving backwards (Darington), bubbles coming out of the tailpipes (Starla), and exhaust pipe broken (Crusher)
5	5	"The Bouncy Tires"	Daniel Ife	Kevin Del Aguila	October 22, 2014	105	1.15
When Zeg tries on a pair of Super Bouncy Tires, he starts bouncing out of control all over Axle City, so it's up to the viewer to help Blaze and AJ find something sticky enough to save him with a little help from their friends Darington and Starla, but they better hurry before Crusher gets his greedy tires on them! STEM Concept: Adhesion Songs: "Hit the Road", "Adhesion" Transformation: Cement mixer Crusher Cheat: Ten Itchy Robots (taken off by Starla) Different Adhesive Substances to Stop Zeg from Bouncing: Darington's tape (failed), Glue (failed), and Cement (successful) Appointment: Tires all flat (Zeg)
6	6	"Epic Sail"	Dustin McKenzie	Dustin Ferrer	October 23, 2014	107	N/A
Crusher's wave machine race leaves himself and Pickle, along with Blaze, AJ, Gabby and Stripes stranded. Can the viewer, Blaze, AJ, Gabby and Stripes team up to repair their boat so they can return to Axle City? STEM Concept: Wind power Songs: "Wind Power", "Let's Go" Transformation: Kite Crusher Cheat: Wild Wave Maker
7	7	"Stuntmania!"	Mike Fetterly	Morgan von Ancken & Kim Duran	October 24, 2014	106	N/A
Darington is excited to participate in Stuntmania, the most epic stunt show the Monster Dome is holding. But when Crusher gives Darington the boot that sends him far away, as well as himself and Pickle (by mistake), Blaze and AJ need your help to find Darington and get back to the Monster Dome before Crusher does. STEM Concept: Acceleration Songs: "Hit the Road", "Acceleration" Transformation: Hair dryer Crusher Cheats: Bouncy Boot Machine, Earthquaker Maker
8	8	"The Jungle Horn"	Daniel Ife	Jeff Borkin	November 4, 2014	109	N/A
Stripes has a special jungle horn he can use to call his animal friends. But when Crusher steals it, the viewer, Blaze, AJ and Stripes embark on an adventure through the jungle to get it back before Crusher uses it to make the animals his pets. STEM Concept: Balance Songs: "Let's Blaze", "Balance" Transformation: Waffle maker Crusher Cheat: Giant Robot Chef
9	9	"The Team Truck Challenge"	Shane Poettcker	Kevin Del Aguila	November 6, 2014	108	N/A
Today, Blaze and AJ are going to be in one of the most awesome races ever: The Team Truck Challenge, a special team race with two trucks on every team. When Pickle spots the various teams and wishes he were on a team with Crusher, he breaks the great news to Crusher and tries to get into a team with him by standing next to him, but Crusher confirms to Pickle that he picked Rudy over him, depressing Pickle so much that Blaze cheers Pickle up by picking him for his team, and they, AJ, and the viewer work together to win with the power of friendship. During the race, Crusher tries to remind Rudy that teammates are supposed to help each other, but Rudy won't listen to him. At the end of the episode, Blaze, AJ and Pickle win The Team Truck Challenge despite getting off to a rocky start and pull Crusher out of a hole after Rudy refuses to get him out and instead eats bananas. STEM Concept: Mass Songs: "Mass", "Let's Blaze" (Instrumental) Transformation: Road roller Crusher Cheat: Giant Cheese Ball Machine
10	10	"Cake-tastrophe!"	Wade Cross	Dustin Ferrer	December 1, 2014	111	N/A
Blaze and AJ go to a bakery, where Clive the baker shows them his Baker Bots which help him bake. But thanks to Crusher for pressing the purple Cooking Crazy buttons, the Baker Bots go haywire and make a mess of the bakery and he and Pickle have to clean it up. Meanwhile, it's up to the viewer to help Blaze and AJ shut them off before Axle City becomes a big mess. STEM Concept: Trajectory Songs: "Hit the Road", "Trajectory" Transformation: Frontloader
11	11	"Truckball Team-Up"	Mike Fetterly	Clark Stubbs	January 8, 2015	110	N/A
Blaze wants to compete in the Truckball tournament against Crusher, but he is depressed when the referee tells him that he needs a team first, and a team needs to have four trucks. So in order to cheer himself up, Blaze, AJ, and the viewer go around town to find three friends (Starla, Zeg, and Darington) who will make Blaze's team. STEM Concept: Levers Songs: "Hit the Road", "Lever" Transformation: Feller buncher Crusher Cheat: Robo-Beanstalks
12	12	"The Mystery Bandit"	Shane Poettcker	Kevin Del Aguila	February 17, 2015	112	1.43
After a race, Blaze's silver racing trophy, Crusher's toy truck named "Little Trucky", Zeg's spoon and Gabby's wrench are stolen by a mysterious bandit, and it's up to the viewers at home to help Blaze and his friends track down the thief and get back their possessions. At the end of the episode, it turns out the bandit was actually Ferris, who is a huge fan of Blaze and has a magnet on the back of his truck that took all of Blaze, Crusher, Zeg and Gabby's belongings all through. STEM Concept: Magnets and magnetic fields Songs: "Hit the Road", "Magnets" Transformation: Maglev train Stolen: Blaze's silver racing Trophy, Crusher's toy truck Little Trucky, Zeg's spoon and Gabby's wrench
13	13	"Gasquatch!"	Mike Fetterly	Jeff Borkin	February 19, 2015	114	N/A
Blaze and AJ notice a mud-loving monster truck in the forest and they and the viewer set out on an adventure to bring their new friend named Gasquatch to an event named Mud Fest. STEM Concept: Inertia Songs: "Hit the Road", "Inertia" Transformation: Tugboat
14	14	"Truck Rangers"	Wade Cross	Dustin Ferrer	March 10, 2015	115	N/A
Blaze and AJ along with their friends join a scouting club called the Truck Rangers and Blaze works with the viewer to earn three Super Ranger badges. Meanwhile, Crusher attempts to cheat while trying to earn Truck Rangers badges, which always ended up with him encountering a skunk who sprays at him. STEM Concept: Sound waves Songs: "Let's Go", "Sound Waves", "Sound Wave Showdown" Transformation: Amplifier by Electric Guitar Crusher Cheats: Animal Grabber, Trampoline, Robo-Bear by Accordion
15	15	"Trouble at the Truck Wash"	Shane Poettcker	Ellen Martin	March 12, 2015	116	1.36
Blaze and his friends have become muddy after practicing some tricks in the mud, so this is a job for the Truck Wash! However, when a muddy Crusher breaks the Truck Wash and makes it malfunction by accident, a muddy Blaze and AJ need your help to find the three lost pieces. STEM Concept: Angles Songs: "Let's Blaze", "Angles" Transformation: Bumper car
16	16	"Zeg and the Egg"	Daniel Ife	Clark Stubbs	April 3, 2015	113	1.45
When Blaze, AJ and Zeg find an egg that belongs to the Truckadactyl, they and the viewer must overcome obstacles with a wedge to return her dinosaur baby. Crusher even loses his ball too. STEM Concept: Wedges Songs: "Let's Go", "Wedge" Transformation: Excavator mounted jackhammer
17	17	"Runaway Rocket"	Wade Cross	Clark Stubbs	May 5, 2015	119	1.09
When Crusher attempts to cheat with his Whammer Hammer during a rocket alien game at the carnival, it malfunctions and strands himself and Pickle on its rocket. Blaze and AJ need your help to chase them and rescue them before their runaway rocket crashes into the garbage dump. The chase is on! STEM Concept: Springs Songs: "Hit the Road", "Springs" Transformation: Pogo stick Crusher Cheat: Whammer Hammer
18	18	"Cattle Drive"	Dan Ife & Andrew Poon	Morgan von Ancken	May 7, 2015	117	1.07
After Starla, who is holding her lasso in her front left tire, gives Blaze his lasso lesson, she, Blaze, and AJ find a family of five cows nearby who are wet and cold, and really sad, so they and the viewer work together to herd them on an adventure to find a home in Starla's barn while embarking on a trio of rescue missions along the way. Meanwhile, Crusher tries to lasso like Starla but keeps messing up. He eventually succeeds at the end of the episode, where he ends up lassoing a stinky cowboy boot. STEM Concept: Currents Songs: "Let's Go", "Current" Transformation: Hang glider
19	19	"Dragon Island Duel"	Mike Fetterly	Jeff Borkin	May 25, 2015	118	1.30
It's the day of the Dragon Island Duel, a race around tropical Dragon Island. But when Crusher cheats and sends Blaze away before the race, AJ needs your help on a solo adventure to rescue his best friend and bring him back to the starting line. STEM Concept: Investigating Songs: "Let's Blaze", "Let's Investigate" Transformation: Roadheader tunneling machine Crusher Cheats: Robo-Bouncy Ball, Laser Bugs
20	20	"Sneezing Cold"	Shane Poettcker	Lucas Mills & Clark Stubbs	June 4, 2015	120	1.16
When the Monster Machines, including Crusher (but excluding Pickle), come down with a case of the "Sneezles", Blaze, AJ and Gabby need your help to hurry back to Axle City and get to the Monster Dome so they can give their friends some medicine oil to cure them. Meanwhile, Pickle tries to look after the Monster Machines, but Crusher keeps doing many things while having the Sneezles and defying Pickle. STEM Concept: Freezing Songs: "Hit the Road", "Freezing" Transformation: Ice machine

=== Season 2 (2015–16) ===
No. overall	No. in season	Title	Directed by	Written by	Original release date	Prod. code	U.S. viewers (millions)
21	1	"Fired Up!"	Shane Poettcker	Gabe Pulliam	September 25, 2015	204	1.35
After firefighters put out smoke in the oven at the Axle City garage, thanks to Crusher burning his pizza, Blaze attempts to be a real firefighter with the viewer's help. Meanwhile, Crusher tries to be a firefighter by rescuing Pickle dressed up as a cat, with disastrous results. Special Guest Star: Joe Manganiello as The Fire Chief STEM Concept: Valves Songs: "Blaze On", "Valves" Blaze earning stars: Warning of a fire at the Axle City Garage, Yogurt factory out of control, saving a baby sheep who's stuck in the quarry, and stopping a forest fire Transformation: Fire engine
22	2	"Dino Dash"	Mike Fetterly	Gabe Pulliam	October 2, 2015	202	1.19
When Zeg gets stuck in a super sticky mud pit after being tossed there by a geyser, Blaze and AJ use the help of the home audience and Zeg's dinosaur friends - and a bit of designing - to help him free. Meanwhile, Crusher has trouble befriending a dinosaur named Fluffy. STEM Concept: Designing Songs: "Let's Blaze", "Design" Transformation: Dinosaurs: Ankylosaurus, Tyrannosaurus, Truckodactyl
23	3	"Truck or Treat!"	Barry Karnowski	Morgan von Ancken	October 23, 2015	201	1.69
It's Halloween, and Blaze and AJ show the viewer how truck or treating works by using Gabby's garage as a tutorial. They then have fun making shadows with Stripes, Starla, Darington, and Zeg. However, Crusher's attempt to steal the candy sends it far away and the Monster Machines need your help to find it before Crusher can get it first and eats all of it. Along the way, Blaze rescues his friends from super sticky mud, they escape a tickling spider cave, and Blaze destroys pumpkins launched from Crusher's Robo-Pumpkin Launcher as a Reciprocating saw. Finally, AJ finishes the job by scaring Crusher with a super scary shadow, allowing him and the monster machines to get their candy back. STEM Concept: Shadows Songs: "Hit the Road", "Shadows" Transformation: Reciprocating saw Crusher Cheats: Halloween Candy Stealer, Robo-Pumpkin Launcher Costumes: Knight (Blaze), Superhero (AJ), Lion (Gabby), Witch (Starla), King (Zeg), Pirate (Stripes), Octopus (Darington), and Banana, Butterfly, and Shoe (Pickle)
24	4	"Race to the Top of the World"	Wade Cross, Shane Poettcker & Jacob Joice	Clark Stubbs	November 23, 2015	219-220 (998)	1.31
25	5	"Race to the Top of the World"	Wade Cross, Shane Poettcker & Jacob Joice	Clark Stubbs	November 23, 2015	219-220 (998)	1.31
Blaze and AJ, along with their friends, Stripes, Starla, Darington, and Zeg, are participating in one of their biggest races yet - the Race to the Top of the World. But when Crusher's cheating throws them off course, they and the viewer must race around the world, battle obstacles, and use their STEM skills to get back to the race and finish first before Crusher with the power of friendship. Special Guest Stars: Anthony Anderson as Pirate Pegwheel and Mayim Bialik as The Great Sphinx STEM Concept: Momentum Songs: "Top of the World", "Keep on Rolling", "Hot Air Rises", "Keep on Rolling (Reprise)", "Momentum", "Top of the World (Reprise)" Transformation: Cannon Crusher Cheat: Wild Whirlwind Machine
26	6	"Monster Machine Christmas"	Jacob Joice	Jeff Borkin	December 11, 2015	206	1.25
On Christmas Eve, Blaze and AJ help Santa load his magic bag of presents until Crusher knocks over the bag by accident, sending the presents flying. So, he, Blaze, the viewer, and AJ team up to rescue them. While trying to rescue the presents. Crusher attempts to use his toy suction cup bow and arrow, his sled, and his toy water blaster to rescue the presents but when trouble strikes, Blaze transforms to stop it! Special Guest Star: Carl Reiner as the narrator, Bob Joles as Santa Claus STEM Concept: Engineers Songs: "Let's Blaze" (Holiday Remix), "I Wanna Be an Engineer for Christmas", "Monster Machine Christmas" Transformations: Bow and arrow, Turbo sled, Water blaster, Sleigh, Frontloader, Ice Machine, Hydrofoil
27	7	"Knight Riders"	Mike Fetterly	Clark Stubbs	January 8, 2016	205	1.72
Blaze and Crusher discover a medieval kingdom of knight trucks, and they become knights themselves and they and the viewer participate in a royal race with them. But it'll take a lot of skills for Sir Blaze to help the knights get past obstacles and beat the always cheating Sir Crusher. STEM Concept: Potential energy Songs: "Blaze On", "Potential Energy" Transformations: Knights (Blaze and Crusher), Catapult Crusher Cheat: Fiery Robot Dragons
28	8	"Darington to the Moon!"	Jacob Joice & Mike Fetterly	Morgan von Ancken	January 15, 2016	207	1.16
When Darington's battery is out of energy, Blaze, AJ and Darington need your help to go to three different power stations to give Darington's battery enough energy to fly to the moon. Meanwhile, Crusher tries flying to the moon in Darington's place with bad results. STEM Concept: Energy Songs: "Ready for Takeoff", "Let's Get Energy" Transformation: Underwater excavator
29	9	"Piggy 500"	Wade Cross	Ellen Martin	February 5, 2016	203	1.31
It's the day of the Piggy 500, and Starla is excited to race with her prize pig, Zippy, in a team race. But when her competitor Crusher and his rude pig, Slop, cheat and send Zippy far away, it's up to the viewer to help Blaze, AJ and Starla search for him. STEM Concept: Pendulums Songs: "Let's Blaze", "Pendulum" Transformation: Tower crane Crusher Cheat: Slop
30	10	"Spark Bug"	Wade Cross	Gabe Pulliam	February 16, 2016	208	1.09
Blaze, AJ, the viewer and Stripes must bring a baby fire beetle named Sparky to his home at the top of the volcano. Meanwhile, Crusher tries to steal a fruit from a very strong friendly little caterpillar so he can have it all to himself. STEM Concept: Structural engineering Songs: "Blaze On", "Structural Engineering" Transformation: Concrete pump truck
31	11	"Five Alarm Blaze"	Shane Poettcker	Clark Stubbs	March 4, 2016	209	1.26
After a race, Fire Engine Blaze and AJ, along with their other friends, get an urgent call from the fire chief saying there's a fire on the bridge and he needs Blaze and AJ's help, so it's up to the viewer to help Blaze and AJ hurry and save the day. Special Guest Star: Joe Manganiello as The Fire Chief STEM Concept: Volume Songs: "Ride of Our Lives", "Volume", "Fired Up", "Fired Up (Reprise)" Transformation: Fire Engine Crusher Cheat: Ice Cream Scooper Machine Appointment: Tire out of air (Darington)
32	12	"Axle City Grand Prix"	Sylvain Blais	Morgan von Ancken	April 12, 2016	210	1.41
After Blaze gets tuned up, various racing trucks get their tires aired and their fuel is filled, and Crusher gets washed up. Crusher steals Gabby's remote that can control anything to stop Blaze from winning, so she, he, the viewer, and AJ work together to beat him and get the remote back in the Axle City Grand Prix. STEM Concept: Rotational speed Songs: "Ready for Takeoff", "Rotational Speed" Transformation: Speedboat Appointments: Tune up (Blaze), Wash up (Crusher), Tire out of air and out of fuel (racing trucks) Crusher Cheat: Using Gabby's remote
33	13	"Treasure Track"	Jacob Joice	Jeff Borkin & Halcyon Person	April 14, 2016	211	1.03
The viewer, Blaze, AJ, Gabby and Pegwheel the Pirate-Truck search the jungle beaches and mountains in an island treasure hunt, which is a racetrack made out of treasure. Meanwhile, Crusher goes on a treasure hunt of his own with disastrous results. Special Guest Star: Anthony Anderson as Pirate Pegwheel STEM Concept: Combustion Songs: "Blaze On", "Combustion" Transformation: Rocket Appointment: Out of fuel (Pegwheel)
34	14	"Rocket Ski Rescue"	Wade Cross	Ellen Martin	May 17, 2016	212	1.34
Blaze and AJ meet their fans and Crusher's Grammy comes to see him in the big race, so Crusher decides to cheat with a pair of rocket skis to impress her. But when the skis malfunction and carry him all over town, Blaze, AJ, the viewer and Grammy work together so they can save her runaway grandson. Special Guest Star: Susan Silo as Grammy, Crusher's Grandmother STEM Concept: Tensile strength Songs: "Ride of Our Lives", "Tensile Strength" Transformation: Woodchipper Crusher Cheat: Rocket Skis
35	15	"Dinosaur Parade"	Shane Poettcker	Gabe Pulliam	May 19, 2016	213	1.31
After Crusher pushes himself into a parade of dinosaurs, scattering the creatures, Blaze, AJ and Zeg need your help to search for them and rescue them. Meanwhile, Crusher tries to lead his own parade with strange participants. STEM Concept: Chain Reaction Songs: "Ready for Takeoff", "Chain Reaction" Transformation: Water cannon
36	16	"Race Car Superstar"	Jacob Joice	Clark Stubbs	May 30, 2016	215	1.67
Blaze and AJ visit VelocityVille, a town full of race cars where everybody loves to go fast. But when a snooty car named Speedrick traps all the other racers, Blaze must use assistance from the viewers to transform into a super fast race car to free his new friends and face off against Speedrick. Special Guest Stars: Danica Patrick, Chase Elliott, Jimmie Johnson, and Kasey Kahne as Rally, Mark Set-Go, Dash, and Fender STEM Concept: Aerodynamics Songs: "Blaze On", "Aerodynamic" Transformation: Race car
37	17	"Race to Eagle Rock"	Wade Cross	Gabe Pulliam	June 2, 2016	216	1.47
Blaze and his friends go to VelocityVille and they and the viewer participate in a grand race to the top of Eagle Rock, but Crusher is also in the race and is out to stop them and repeatedly diverts them off course. Special Guest Stars: Danica Patrick, Chase Elliott, Jimmie Johnson, and Kasey Kahne as Rally, Mark Set-Go, Dash, and Fender STEM Concept: Velocity Songs: "Ride of Our Lives", "Velocity" Transformation: Race Car (Blaze, Stripes, Starla, Darington, Zeg, Crusher, and Pickle) Crusher Cheat: Slippery Slime Blasters
38	18	"Sky Track"	Shane Poettcker	Jeff Borkin & Halcyon Person	September 27, 2016	217	1.37
When Swoops loses his rotor, thanks to a branch hitting it in the storm, the viewer, Blaze and AJ head to the Sky Track to try and get it back. Meanwhile, at VelocityVille, Crusher tries to use his Robo-Cloud to make it rain but it ends up raining foods instead. STEM Concept: Clouds Songs: "Clouds", "Ready for Takeoff" Transformation: Race Car (Blaze, Crusher, and Pickle) Appointment: Rotor coming loose (Swoops) Crusher Cheat: Giant Robo-Cloud
39	19	"The Wishing Wheel"	Sylvain Blais	Clark Stubbs	September 29, 2016	218	1.09
Blaze, AJ, the viewer and Stripes try to stay on track while searching for a magical treasure named "The Wishing Wheel", a wheel that has the power that will grant one wish come true for one lucky race car. Meanwhile, Crusher and Pickle are also hunting for the wheel, but get stuck at the big loop-de-loop. Special Guest Stars: Danica Patrick, Jimmie Johnson, and Kasey Kahne as Rally, Dash, and Fender STEM Concept: Centripetal Force Songs: "Blaze On", "Centripetal Force" Transformation: Race Car (Blaze, Stripes, Crusher, and Pickle) Crusher Cheats: Tire Glue, Tire Springs, Tire Rockets
40	20	"Pickle Power"	Sylvain Blais	Morgan von Ancken	November 18, 2016	214	1.63
When Crusher's attempt to clean up with his mechanical vacuum goes haywire and sucks up everything including himself, the viewer, Blaze, AJ and Pickle work together to find a way to turn it off and save him. STEM Concept: Elasticity Songs: "Ready for Takeoff", "Elasticity" Transformation: Slingshot Crusher Cheat: Auto-Vac

=== Season 3 (2016–18) ===
No. overall	No. in season	Title	Directed by	Written by	Original release date	Prod. code	U.S. viewers (millions)
41	1	"Dinocoaster"	Shane Poettcker	Gabe Pulliam	October 10, 2016	303	1.36
Blaze, AJ and Zeg all wanted to ride the Dinocoaster, a dinosaur-themed roller coaster, but Zeg's ticket blows away. So the viewer, Blaze and AJ must help Zeg track down his ticket. Meanwhile, Crusher tries to dig his way to the front of the line of the bounce house but winds up in various carnival games instead. STEM Concept: Collision Songs: "Ready for Takeoff", "Collision" Transformation: Impact Hammer
42	2	"The Hundred Mile Race"	Jacob Joice	Halcyon Person	November 4, 2016	301	1.27
Blaze goes to VelocityVille and he and the viewer compete against his race car friends in the longest race ever - the Hundred Mile Race, but Crusher is competing as well and will do anything to win. Special Guest Stars: Danica Patrick, Chase Elliott, Jimmie Johnson, and Kasey Kahne as Rally, Mark Set-Go, Dash, and Fender STEM Concept: Hydraulics Songs: "Hundred Mile Race", "Hydraulics", "Hundred Mile Race (Reprise)" Transformations: Race car (Blaze, Crusher, and Pickle), Hydraulic Cutter, Hydraulic Spreader Crusher Cheats: Giant Coconut Blaster, Trapping Spider
43	3	"The Polar Derby"	Wade Cross	Morgan von Ancken	December 9, 2016	302	1.43
Blaze and his friends visit VelocityVille where Pickle hosts an arctic-themed race and the monster machines and the viewer compete to win an ice trophy, but Crusher is also racing and is out to stop them and divert them off course. STEM Concept: Melting Songs: "Blaze On", "Melting" Transformation: Race car (Blaze, Stripes, Starla, Darington, Zeg, Crusher, and Pickle), Heat cannon Crusher Cheats: Abominable Blaster, Super Sun Machine
44	4	"Light Riders"	Wade Cross & Bronwyn Martens	Morgan von Ancken	January 6, 2017	306	1.45
When a light thief steals every light from Axle City, Blaze, AJ, Gabby, Stripes, Starla, Darington, and Zeg are all outfitted with special lights to help them and the viewer track down the thief and restore the lost lights. Meanwhile, Crusher claims he can find anything in the dark, but is proven wrong. Special Guest Star: Melissa Rauch as the Light Thief STEM Concept: Light Songs: "Blazing Amazing", "Light", "Light (Reprise)" Transformation: Laser
45	5	"Catch That Cake!"	Bronwyn Dennison & Wade Cross	Clark Stubbs	March 28, 2017	309	1.04
It’s Darington’s birthday, but when Crusher tries to steal his birthday cake, the cake accidentally flies away! Now Blaze and AJ need your help to catch the runaway cake before Crusher can get to it. STEM Concept: Kinetic Energy Songs: "Burn Rubber", "Kinetic Energy" Transformation: Crawler crane Crusher Cheats: Flying Robo-Plate, Bumper Bots, Super Slippery Ice Machine Note: In production order, this is the last episode to feature the original animation style, before changing it in the Wild Wheels mini-series.
46	6	"The Bouncing Bull Racetrack"	Shane Poettcker	Gabe Pulliam	March 30, 2017	307	0.97
When Blaze, AJ and Starla discover a map that leads to the legendary Bouncing Bull Racetrack, the friends and the viewer set out on a Wild West quest to find the track and take the ride of their lives. Meanwhile, Crusher tries to steal a carrot from a tricky chicken. STEM Concept: Boiling Songs: "Burn Rubber", "Boiling" Transformation: Steam Engine
47	7	"Mega Mud Robot"	Jacob Joice	Halcyon Person	April 21, 2017	305	1.19
Gasquatch is back! He’s been saving his money to buy a toy robot, but when he discovers that his money is missing, Blaze and AJ must help him find it before the toy store closes. Meanwhile, Crusher has trouble playing with Pickle’s new robot dog. STEM Concept: Counterweights Songs: "Burn Rubber", "Counterweight" Transformation: Trebuchet
48	8	"Knighty Knights"	Sylvian Blais	Clark Stubbs	April 28, 2017	304	1.03
In the kingdom of Knight-Trucks, Blaze and AJ need your help to recover a stolen charging machine before everyone in the kingdom runs out of energy and falls asleep. Meanwhile, Crusher tries to become king by stealing a crown from its strange bearers. STEM Concept: Pulleys Songs: "Ride of Our Lives", "Pulley" Transformation: Crossbow
49	9	"Animal Island"	Shane Poettcker & Jacob Joice	Clark Stubbs	May 29, 2017	310	1.40
While out on a sailboat ride, Blaze, AJ, and Stripes discover Animal Island, a magical island inhabited by friendly animals, each with a special ability of their own. But when a greedy chameleon named Lazard, along with his warthog henchmen Wartimer and Snout, steals all the animals’ powers in hopes of keeping them for himself, Blaze, AJ, and Stripes must avoid Lazard’s obstacles and recover the stolen powers with help from the viewer. Special Guest Stars: Cedric Yarbrough as Nelson the Rhino and Billy Ray Cyrus as Lazard the Chameleon Lizard STEM Concept: Animals: Gorillas, Falcons, and Lions Songs: "Welcome to Animal Island", "Gorilla", "Welcome to Animal Island (Reprise)" Lazard Cheats: Power Stealing Machine, Humongo Walls, Glue Globber, Snapper Trappers Transformations: Gorilla, Falcon, Lion (Blaze); Super Tiger Stripes (Stripes) Note: The animation was updated as of this episode, such as Blaze's face being redesigned (larger eyes, more expressive mouth) and gaining taillights on his bumper, and the vehicles' paintjobs becoming reflective.
50	10	"Toucan Do It!"	Sylvain Blais & Sebastian Brodin	Halcyon Person & Morgan von Ancken	May 31, 2017	311	1.39
Blaze, Starla and Darington want to play jungle ball, but their teammate Tooks the Toucan gets her tail feathers stuck under a huge rock after catching the ball far away from the stadium and they need your help to rescue her. Meanwhile, Crusher is disgusted at the animal food the stadium is offering. Special Guest Stars: Cedric Yarbrough as Nelson the Rhino, Eric Morgan Stuart as Burt Black n' White, and Kelsea Ballerini as Tooks the Toucan Bird STEM Concept: Animals: Elephants, Toucans, Flying Squirrels, and Rhinoceroses, Songs: "Wild Wheels", "Flying Sqirrel" Transformations: Elephant (Starla); Flying squirrel (Darington); Rhinoceros (Blaze)
51	11	"Falcon Quest"	Bronwyn Dennison	Gabe Pulliam & Halcyon Person	September 26, 2017	313	1.00
Challenged by a tough-talking falcon, the viewer, Blaze, AJ, and Gabby take off on a journey to earn their place with the fast fliers in the sky above Animal Island. Meanwhile, Crusher tries to sample some food from the birds. Special Guest Stars: Eric Morgan Stuart as Burt Black n' White and Darius Rucker as Thunderwing STEM Concept: Animals: Falcons Songs: "Wild Wheels", "Falcons" Transformation: Falcon Crusher Cheat: Super Sneaking Stilts
52	12	"The Big Ant-venture"	Sebastian Brodin & Wade Cross	Gabe Pulliam	September 28, 2017	312	0.90
Blaze and Zeg are on Animal Island when they discover an insect city and they and the viewer go on an adventure to catch a runaway firefly egg. Meanwhile, Crusher has some trouble when he uses Pickle's insect helmet. Special Guest Star: Cedric Yarbrough as Nelson the Rhino STEM Concept: Animals: Insects (Ants, Bees, Caterpillars, Ladybugs, Butterflies, & Grasshoppers) Songs: "We're on Our Way", "Insects" Transformations: Ant (Blaze); Grasshopper (Zeg)
53	13	"Ready, Set, Roar!"	Shane Poettcker	Morgan von Ancken	October 24, 2017	314	0.81
Blaze and Stripes transform into ferociously fast jungle cats to race in the Animal Island Championship! But to win, they and the viewer will have to beat Crusher disguised as a cheating cheetah. Can they claw their way to victory? Special Guest Stars: Cedric Yarbrough as Nelson the Rhino and Eric Morgan Stuart as Burt Black n' White STEM Concept: Animals: Great Cats (Lions & Tigers) Songs: "Wild Wheels", "Great Cats" Transformations: Lion (Blaze); Super Tiger Stripes (Stripes) Crusher Cheats: Chompy the Chomper Robot, Twisty Tangler Vines, Super Sleepy Lullaby Machine
54	14	"The Great Animal Crown"	Shawn Gulley	Clark Stubbs	October 26, 2017	315	0.89
When the Great Animal Crown is lost at the bottom of the ocean, Blaze transforms into a super-fast shark and needs your help to retrieve it for his friends on Animal Island before Crusher can grab it and become the king of Animal Island. Special Guest Star: Cedric Yarbrough as Nelson the Rhino STEM Concept: Animals: Sharks Song: "Sharks" Transformation: Shark Crusher Cheat: Horrible Hider-Bots, Giant Robo-Octopus
55	15	"Tow Truck Tough"	Sylvain Blais	Morgan von Ancken	November 22, 2017	308	1.29
Blaze transforms into a tow-truck, and, with the help of the viewer, he, AJ and Gabby, sets off on a tow-tally awesome adventure to save Stripes and fix his tire after falling in a big hole after a branch broke off the tree after he caught volleyball while playing volleyball with his monkey friends. Meanwhile, Crusher tries to be a tow truck by hooking up to Pickle, but the cheater keeps missing. STEM Concept: Torque Songs: "Tow Truck Team", "Torque", "Tow Truck Team (Reprise)" Transformation: Tow Truck Appointments: Broken engine (Crusher), tire broken (Stripes) Crusher Cheat: Makeshift tow truck crane Note: In airing order, this is the last episode to feature the original animation style, before officially updating it. Additionally, it was originally set to release before the Wild Wheels mini-series.
56	16	"Race for the Golden Treasure"	Shane Poettcker	Ellen Martin	December 4, 2017	317	1.30
When Blaze and AJ discover a map leading to a golden treasure chest, they team up with Pegwheel the Pirate and his crew for an exciting treasure hunt. To unlock the chest, they must find three special keys scattered along the way. But unbeknownst to them, Crusher is hot on their trail, hoping to steal the keys and claim the treasure for himself. Special Guest Star: Anthony Anderson as Pirate Pegwheel STEM Concept: Vortexes Songs: "Arrr, Let's Blaze", "Vortex" Transformation: Vortex Cannon Note: From this episode onward, due to DHX Media taking over the animation, the new animation style introduced in Animal Island was used.
57	17	"Need for Blazing Speed"	Shawn Gulley	Clark Stubbs	January 23, 2018	318	1.07
After Blaze and Crusher take part in a race, Crusher gets fed up with Blaze winning all the time, he attempts to steal Blaze's Blazing Speed engine and get it for himself, but he accidentally lets it go loose and Blaze, AJ, and Gabby need your help to get it back before Crusher does and becomes the world's best Monster Machine. STEM Concept: Propulsion Songs: "We're Blazing Amazing!", "Propulsion" Transformation: Sailboat Crusher Cheat: Mud Copters Appointment: Blazing Speed engine missing Propulsional objects to help Blaze move without his engine: Balloon, Joe and Gus's slingshot, Darington's toy rocket, trampolines, whipped cream cans, sailboat, beach ball, Crusher's mud copters' rotors
58	18	"Fast Friends"	Bronwyn Dennison	Halcyon Person	January 25, 2018	316	1.00
Blaze, AJ, and Gabby meet a brand new monster machine named Watts - a super fast truck with electric tires and chooses Gabby as her driver; but when one of her special electric tires goes rolling into the jungle after she bumped it on a log while she and Gabby drove off the road thanks to falling rocks, the viewer, Blaze, AJ, and Gabby promise to help her get it back. Meanwhile, back in Axle City, Crusher tries to get new tires but refuses to follow the instructions. STEM Concept: Fasteners Songs: "We're on Our Way", "Fasteners" Transformation: Grapple truck Appointment: Tire loose (Watts)
59	19	"Raceday Rescue"	Shane Poettcker	Clark Stubbs	February 20, 2018	320	0.92
On race day, Crusher cheats twice as hard to beat Blaze, AJ, Watts, and Gabby -- sending both drivers far, far away from the Monster Dome via a bubble; the viewer, Blaze and Watts become determined to get AJ and Gabby back in their driver seats using Blaze' Blazing Speed and Watts' electric charge to get back to the Monster Dome in time, where AJ and Gabby must drive Blaze and Watts in a race against Crusher with the true power of friendship. AJ...Gabby...GIVE US SOME SPEED! STEM Concept: Electricity Songs: "We're on Our Way", "Electricity" Transformation: Subway train Crusher Cheat: Take Away Your Partner Machine
60	20	"Defeat the Cheat"	Bronwyn Dennison	Morgan von Ancken	February 22, 2018	319	0.85
Pickle starts his own show named Pickle TV and hosts the second Team Truck Challenge which pairs trucks together in racing teams and this time, the viewer, Blaze and AJ must team up with their rival Crusher. STEM Concept: Inclines Songs: "Burn Rubber", "Inclines" Transformation: Tow Truck Crusher Cheats: Cheating Cheat-apult, Super Cheat-y Rocket Pack

=== Season 4 (2018–19) ===
No. overall	No. in season	Title	Directed by	Written by	Original release date	Prod. code	U.S. viewers (millions)
61	1	"The Chicken Circus!"	Bronwyn Dennison	Matt Doyle & Veronica Pickett	March 26, 2018	403	0.93
When Crusher accidentally launches away the chickens for a circus act, Blaze, AJ and Darington need your help to find them while Crusher does the circus in their place with Pickle distracting the crowd. STEM Concept: Comparisons Songs: "Let's Go", "Comparison" Transformation: Circus cannon
62	2	"The Pickle Family Campout"	Shawn Gulley	Veronica Pickett & Clark Stubbs	April 6, 2018	402	0.91
When all the members of Pickle's family get lost in the woods, Pickle teams up with the viewer, Blaze as a tow truck and AJ to save them. Meanwhile, while Crusher baby sits Baby Gherkin, Crusher tries to eat the whole bag of marshmallows, but Baby Gherkin keeps stopping him until Blaze, AJ, Pickle and his family come back! Special Guest Stars: Stephanie Courtney as Tilly, Judy Greer as Lilly and Baby Gherkin, Steve Little as Ben, Wendi McLendon-Covey as Milly and Frilly, Chris Parnell as Ken and Sven, Jim Rash as Grandpa Pickle STEM Concept: Load Songs: "The Pickle Family Song", "Load", "The Pickle Family Song (Reprise)" Transformation: Tow truck
63	3	"Robot Power"	Bronwyn Dennison	Halcyon Person & Morgan von Ancken	May 28, 2018	401	1.34
When Crusher accidentally makes three destructive robots without following the rules of robotics and they get released into town, Blaze transforms into a super strong robot to go after them and stop them with the help from the viewers. Meanwhile, Pickle pretends to be a robot and constantly keeps giving Crusher the wrong things. STEM Concept: Robotics Songs: "Robot Power", "Robotics" Transformation: Robot Crusher Cheat: Wrecking robots
64	4	"Breaking the Ice"	Shane Poettcker	Clark Stubbs	June 12, 2018	406	0.94
Gabby gives Blaze a big surprise - a robot headquarters where he can practice his robot powers. But when they and AJ get a call from a little bunny who's trapped on a glacier that's breaking apart, Blaze, AJ, and Gabby need your help to hurry and save her. Special Guest Star: Jenna Dewan Tatum as the Little Bunny STEM Concept: Coding Songs: "Robot Power", "Code Go!", "Moose Ditty" Transformation: Robot
65	5	"Robots to the Rescue"	Shawn Gulley	Halcyon Person	June 14, 2018	407	0.93
When three big emergencies turn out to be too much for one truck alone, Robot Blaze's friends turn themselves into super strong robots and they're gonna need your help to save Axle City from a runaway train, an overflowing glue factory, and an erupting volcano. Meanwhile, Crusher and Pickle play with their own robots: Beeper (Pickle) and Klunk (Crusher). Crusher tries to get Klunk to make better snacks than Beeper. STEM Concept: Coding Songs: "Robot Power", "Code Go" Transformation: Robot (Blaze, Stripes, Starla, Darington, Zeg, and Watts)
66	6	"The Super-Size Prize"	Shawn Gulley	Morgan von Ancken	June 26, 2018	405	1.24
Blaze and AJ need your help to earn some money to buy a special big prize at the fair by doing jobs for other trucks before it runs out. Meanwhile, Crusher has some trouble when he encounters Pickle's various jobs. STEM Concept: Mechanical engineering Songs: "Get to Work!", "Mechanical Engineering" Transformations: Sky sprayer, Toothbrush sub, Pizza mobile
67	7	"T-Rex Trouble"	Bronwyn Dennison	Halcyon Person	September 14, 2018	408	0.68
While in Dinosaur Valley, Blaze and Zeg use help from the viewers and robot power to help three baby tyrannosauruses named Stompy, Chompy, and Squeak get back to their home on T-Rex Rock. Meanwhile, Pickle teaches some dinosaurs different dances and Crusher winds up joining in. STEM Concept: Coding Songs: "Robot Power", "Code Go" Transformations: Robot (Blaze and Zeg), Robo-Racer Mode
68	8	"Meatball Mayhem"	Shane Poettcker	Clark Stubbs	October 2, 2018	409	0.74
Crusher accidentally spills a jar of grow spice on one of his meatballs, causing it to grow to giant size and roll away with him stuck in it with other trucks, so Blaze and Pickle use help from the viewers to become robots to stop it before it wrecks Axle city entirely. STEM Concept: Coding Songs: "Robot Power", "Code Go!" Transformation: Robot (Blaze and Pickle)
69	9	"Robots in Space"	Shawn Gulley	Veronica Pickett	October 4, 2018	410	0.65
When Commander Megan's ship malfunctions and deserts her on Pluto, the Monster Machines become space robots and they and the viewer venture into outer space to rescue her. Meanwhile, Crusher tries to go into space but Pickle keeps messing up the blastoff. Special Guest Star: Megan McArthur as Commander Megan STEM Concept: Planets Songs: "Robot Power", "Planets" Transformation: Space robot (Blaze, Stripes, Starla, Darington, Zeg, and Watts)
70	10	"Power Tires"	Bronwyn Dennison	Halcyon Person	October 16, 2018	411	0.77
Pickle hosts the Race to Lava Island, and Blaze, AJ, and Gabby go off to a rough start when Blaze's tires pop thanks to cacti upon diverting off course thanks to logs falling off the road. Luckily, Gabby gives him special Power Tires - Tires that can turn into anything to help him keep going and stay on track with help from the viewers. Meanwhile, Pickle opens a tire store with strange tires. STEM Concept: Traction Songs: "Burn Rubber", "Traction" Crusher Cheats: Blasterbird, Giant Robot Baker
71	11	"Ninja Blaze"	Shane Poettcker	Halcyon Person	October 18, 2018	404	0.65
Blaze and AJ train to be ninjas with Ninja Master Blackbelt and use their moves and help from the viewers to rescue Crusher and Pickle from a snowy mountain after they capulted themselves. Meanwhile, while waiting, Pickle tries to cheer Crusher up by singing familiar tunes, only for him to insert "ninja" into the lyrics and for Crusher to tell him the words are wrong. Special Guest Star: DJ Khaled as Master Blackbelt STEM Concept: Strong force Songs: "Ninjas!", "Stronger the Force", "Ninjas! (Reprise)" Transformation: Grappling hook launcher
72	12	"Snow Day Showdown"	Shane Poettcker	Morgan von Ancken	December 21, 2018	412-413	0.92
During a snowy day in Axle City, Crusher attempts to take all hot chocolate for himself but he accidentally sends it launching onto a faraway mountain, and the viewer, Blaze and AJ are hot pursuit to get it back before Crusher with a little help from Gabby and all their Monster Machine friends. Along the way, Pickle intervenes and ends up inviting Crusher to join with him in various winter sports. STEM Concept: Snowflakes Songs: "Snowflakes", "Let's Blaze" Transformation: Snow cannon Crusher Cheats: Snow Sharks, Snowball-Throwing Robots
73	13	"Construction Crew to the Rescue"	Shawn Gulley & Marcelo Ortiz	Clark Stubbs	January 11, 2019	414	0.83
Blaze, Stripes and Starla become construction vehicles and use help from the viewers to rescue Crusher and Pickle when they build a tall tower with no way back down. While waiting, Crusher plays a guessing game with Pickle but Pickle constantly keeps guessing wrong. STEM Concept: Drafting Songs: "Get to Work!", "Blazing Amazing", "Drafting" Transformation: Bulldozer (Blaze), Crane (Starla), Excavator (Stripes) Crusher Cheat: World's Tallest Tower
74	14	"Officer Blaze"	Bronwyn Dennison	Veronica Pickett	February 15, 2019	415	1.05
Blaze and AJ become police officers and they and the viewer help Officer Anna solve three problems around town. Meanwhile, Crusher has problems being a police officer himself when Pickle messes up the siren. Special Guest Star: Nia Long as Officer Anna STEM Concept: Deduction Songs: "Police Anthem", "Deduction", "Police Anthem (Reprise)" Transformation: Police car
75	15	"The Flying Lion"	Shane Poettcker	Ellen Martin	March 8, 2019	416	0.73
The viewer, Blaze and AJ discover a magical world where they meet a flying lion named Roarian, but his magical sunstone goes missing when Crusher attempts to take it, and that results in Roarian turning to the statue form he was originally; now Blaze has to get it back before Crusher does. Along the way, Crusher tries singing with Pickle to pass the time, only for the lyrics to foreshadow a mishap that Crusher gets into. Special Guest Star: Regi Davis as Roarian the Flying Lion STEM Concept: Patterns Songs: "Roarian!", "Patterns", "Roarian! (Reprise)" Transformation: Gantry crane Crusher Cheat: Robo-storm clouds
76	16	"Royal Rescue"	Bronwyn Dennison	Clark Stubbs	March 22, 2019	418	0.81
When the King accidentally catapults himself away, Blaze, AJ and his pet dragon Zeke become knights and race to his rescue with help from the viewers. Meanwhile, Pickle opens a knight store and Crusher ends up buying armor with strange additions to it. STEM Concept: Metal Songs: "Blaze On", "Metal" Transformation: Electromagnet
77	17	"The 100 Egg Challenge"	Marcelo Ortiz	Jeff Borkin & Stacey Greenberger	April 12, 2019	420-421	0.73
The viewer, Blaze and Crusher race each other in the 100 Egg Challenge to see who will find 100 eggs and win a chocolate trophy. Meanwhile, Pickle smells some flowers and Crusher smells some with disgusting scents. STEM Concept: Calculators and addition Songs: "Blaze On", "Addition" Transformation: Power Sheers Crusher Cheat: Giant robot gopher
78	18	"Blaze and the Magic Genie"	Terry Liang	Veronica Pickett	June 10, 2019	419	0.68
Blaze and AJ meet a genie in the desert who can grant any wish they want, but he loses his three wishing jewels in a sandstorm and they need your help to help him retrieve them. Meanwhile, Crusher participates on Pickle's genie-themed game show which gives him strange prizes. Special Guest Star: Justin Guarini as the Genie STEM Concept: Symmetry Songs: "You Wish It!", "It's Symmetrical", "You Wish It! (Reprise)" Transformation: Sandrail
79	19	"The Midnight Mile"	Bronwyn Dennison	Morgan von Ancken & Miden Wood	June 12, 2019	422	0.70
The viewer, Blaze, AJ, Gabby and the Monster Machines race in a midnight race, the Midnight Mile, where the winner gets a glow-in-the-dark trophy. During the race, Pickle reads Crusher strange bedtime stories which happen to come true. STEM Concept: Circuits Songs: "Burn Rubber", "Circuits" Transformation: Spotlight Crusher Cheat: Pillow Fighting Robots
80	20	"Ninja Soup"	Marcelo Ortiz	Morgan von Ancken	September 9, 2019 (Note: This episode was first released on the Nick Jr. Channel website and app on February 24, 2019.)	417	0.39
The viewer, Blaze, AJ and Blackbelt work to find ingredients for a special soup for Blackbelt's Grandma Ninja when she gets a cold. Meanwhile, Crusher opens Pickle's piñatas which have rather strange goodies inside. Special Guest Stars: Dempsey Pappion as Master Blackbelt, Jo Marie Payton as Grandma Ninja STEM Concept: Suction Songs: "Ninjas!", "Suction" Transformation: Vacuum truck

=== Season 5 (2019–21) ===
No. overall	No. in season	Title	Directed by	Written by	Original release date	Prod. code	U.S. viewers (millions)
81	1	"The Island of Lost Treasure"	Bronwyn Dennison	Stacey Greenberger	August 16, 2019	503	0.55
When Blaze, AJ, and Darington arrive at the Island of Lost Treasure and find a map to a treasure chest, they need your help to dodge various obstacles if they want to find out what it is. Meanwhile, back in Axle City, Crusher joins Pickle for various hunts which turns out to be noted as expected. STEM Concept: Momentum Songs: "Lost Treasure", "Momentum", "Lost Treasure (Reprise)" Transformation: Icebreaker ship
82	2	"AJ to the Rescue"	Terry Liang	Veronica Pickett	September 10, 2019	501	0.54
Blaze gets trapped in super sticky mud after rescuing the little monkey's kite, and AJ needs your help on a solo adventure to find animal friends who will help free him. Meanwhile, Pickle hosts a comedy improv and Crusher runs into trouble when he tries to tell a joke himself. STEM Concept: Adaptive Traits Songs: "We're on Our Way", "Adaptive Traits"
83	3	"The Trophy Chase"	Marcelo Ortiz	Clark Stubbs	September 11, 2019	502	0.45
Blaze, Stripes, Starla, and Zeg team up with the viewer when they have to retrieve a trophy for the championship race after Crusher's latest invention the Flying Fetcher steals it before the race begins. The chase is on! During the chase, Pickle shows Crusher the trophies he earned for avoiding accidents. When Crusher becomes super disappointed that he didn't get a trophy, Blaze, Stripes, Starla, Zeg, and Crusher all race together and win their own trophies! STEM Concept: Photons Songs: "Blazing Amazing", "Photons" Transformation: X-ray Machine Crusher Cheats: Flying Fetcher, Grow-In-The-Dark-Robots, Laser Trash Cans, Vacuum Traps
84	4	"Babysitting Heroes"	Terry Liang	Morgan von Ancken	September 12, 2019	504	0.48
Blaze, AJ and Stripes babysit some baby animals, but they fly away on bubbles and they need your help to save them. Meanwhile, Crusher claims he can do the animal talents Pickle tries out with disastrous results. STEM Concept: Gears Songs: "Babysitting", "Gears", "Babysitting (Reprise)" Transformation: Fishing Rod
85	5	"Abra-Ka-Pickle!"	Marcelo Ortiz	Miden Wood	October 25, 2019	505	0.55
Pickle is putting on a magic show for all of Axle City, and his magic tricks are done with help of his magic wand. But when Crusher accidentally makes a magical mistake, it's up to the viewer to help Blaze and Pickle fix the magic and save him, Starla, and Darington. STEM Concept: Measurement Songs: "Abra-Ka-Pickle!", "Measure It", "Abra-Ka-Pickle! (Reprise)" Transformation: Continuous Miner Machine
86	6	"Toy Trouble!"	Bronwyn Dennison	Veronica Pickett	December 6, 2019	506	0.62
Blaze, AJ, Gabby, and Watts are visiting the Axle City toy store, a toy store where an amazing machine can make any toy one wants, but when Crusher unknowingly uses it to make massive toys that run amok, only Blaze, AJ, Gabby, and Watts can use the help of the viewers to stop the giant toys from making a giant mess! Meanwhile, Pickle shows Crusher his collection of Pickle toys which he doesn't take a liking for that much. STEM Concept: Absorption Songs: "Blazing Amazing", "Absorption", "Monster Machine Friends" Transformation: Landfill Compactor
87	7	"Deep Sea Grand Prix"	Terry Liang	Miden Wood	January 31, 2020	510	0.65
For the first time ever, the viewer, Blaze and AJ race under the ocean; Blaze transforms into a submarine and speeds through sunken ships and coral reefs to reach the giant sand castle at the finish line before Crusher. STEM Concept: Air Songs: "Deep Sea Grand Prix", "Floating" Transformation: Submarine Crusher Cheat: Trapper fish
88	8	"Recycling Power!"	Marcelo Ortiz	Clark Stubbs	February 11, 2020	511	0.46
When Axle City is visited by a littering raccoon named the Litter Critter, it's up to the viewer to help Blaze and AJ save the day; Blaze transforms into a Super Recycling Truck and cleans up the town and rescues his friends just in time for a final showdown with the Litter Critter. Special Guest Star: "Weird Al" Yankovic as the Litter Critter STEM Concept: Recycling Songs: "Litter Critter", "Recycling", "Recycling (Reprise)" Transformation: Super Recycling Truck
89	9	"The Great Space Race"	Bronwyn Dennison	Veronica Pickett	February 13, 2020	509	0.51
For the first time, the viewer, Blaze and AJ race in space; Blaze transforms into a spaceship and takes off into space for the Great Space Race, and he and AJ join aliens Zork, Oola and Zuzu to race to the finishing planet against Crusher and his rocket. During the race, Crusher encounters Pickle searching for foods in space which he unintentionally finds for him. STEM Concept: Thrust Songs: "Space Race", "Thrust", "Space Race (Reprise)" Transformation: Spaceship Crusher Cheat: Space Cowboy
90	10	"Ice Cream Monster Machine"	Terry Liang	Clark Stubbs	March 10, 2020	507	0.51
Gasquatch invites Blaze, AJ, and their friends to his ice cream party, but realizes he forgot the ice cream; Blaze transforms into an ice cream maker and he and Gasquatch race to reach Gasquatch's house in time with help from the viewers. Meanwhile, Crusher gets some ice cream for dessert but ends up with different animals inside each one. STEM Concept: Solid, Liquid, or Gas Songs: "Ice Cream", "Solid, Liquid, or Gas", "Ice Cream (Reprise)" Transformation: Ice Cream Maker
91	11	"The Mechanic Team!"	Bronwyn Dennison	Morgan von Ancken	March 12, 2020	512	0.50
Blaze hangs out at Gabby's garage for a fuel pump replacement – just as she gets an alert. Three far-flung trucks need her mechanical know-how. So, the viewer, Blaze and AJ volunteer to help her take her garage on the go. Meanwhile, Crusher and Pickle look after her garage, but Crusher keeps playing things in there. STEM Concept: Systems Songs: "Mechanic Team", "Systems" Transformation: Submersible Appointments: Fuel pump broken (Blaze), Steering column broken (Cowboy), 3 out of 6 pistons missing (Pirate), and Brake pads fell apart (Yellow Knight)
92	12	"Blazing Amazing Stories"	Marcelo Ortiz	Miden Wood	April 24, 2020	514	0.62
Blaze, AJ, Crusher, and Pickle are babysitting for Baby Gherkin! When it's time for her nap, they and the viewer tell her three epic bedtime stories about police, cowboys, and superheroes - all starring Blaze, AJ, Crusher, and Pickle! Special Guest Star: Judy Greer as Baby Gherkin STEM Concept: Observation Songs: "Police Anthem" (Instrumental), "Observation"
93	13	"Big Rig Blaze"	Bronwyn Dennison	Ivy Davis & Clark Stubbs	May 15, 2020	515	0.46
When a windstorm blows away the supplies for Stripes' Animal Party, Blaze transforms into the one Monster Machine strong enough to haul them all back: a Big Rig. But they and the viewer better hurry before the pirate bighorns steal everything! Meanwhile, Pickle is pretending to be a Big Rig as well and gives Crusher things that turned out to be animals. STEM Concept: Force Songs: "Big Rig Roll", "Force" (Remix) Transformation: Big Rig
94	14	"The Big Balloon Rescue"	Marcelo Ortiz	Veronica Pickett	June 12, 2020	513	0.39
All of Axle City is enjoying the Balloon Fair until Crusher and Pickle get stuck on a runaway hot air balloon; now it's up to the viewer to help Blaze and AJ rescue their high-flying friends before they crash into the Slime Volcano. STEM Concept: Speedometer Songs: "Burn Rubber", "Speedometer", "Monster Machine Friends" Transformation: Thunder boat
95	15	"Space Alien Adventure!"	Marcelo Ortiz	Morgan von Ancken	July 31, 2020	516	0.43
The viewer, Blaze and AJ make friends with a space alien named Gormy, but when Gormy's jet pack loses power, they set out to help him find three special space batteries so he can fly home to his alien family. Meanwhile, Crusher looks into Pickle's telescope and sees stuff from outer space falling from the sky. STEM Concept: Trajectory Songs: "Blaze On", "Trajectory" Transformation: Fan boat
96	16	"Video Game Heroes"	Bronwyn Dennison	Ivy Davis	October 2, 2020	518	0.44
The viewer, Blaze and AJ must retrieve three keys that flew out of Blaze's new video game after Crusher dropped it and slipped in a mud puddle, and save the dragon stuck in the tower. Meanwhile, Crusher and Pickle test out the power shapes that came from Blaze's game, Pickle's results come in great forms and Crusher's results come in strange forms. STEM Concept: Geometry Songs: "Video Game Heroes", "Geometry", "Video Game Heroes (Reprise)"
97	17	"The Race Around the Earth"	Marcelo Ortiz	Clark Stubbs	October 16, 2020	520	0.49
In their biggest race ever, the viewer, Blaze and AJ go head-to-head against Crusher to race all the way around the Earth and win the World's Biggest Trophy! During the race, Pickle drives every vehicle to go around the world. STEM Concept: Mechanical engineering Songs: "Race Around the Earth", "Mechanical Engineering", "Race Around the Earth (Reprise)" Transformation: Jackhammer speedboat, Pogo snowmobile, Water blaster jet Crusher Cheats: Cannonball Blasting Blaster Fish, Lava-Rama Ray
98	18	"The Blaze Family"	Marcelo Ortiz	Veronica Pickett	November 6, 2020	517	0.53
The viewer, Blaze and AJ are spending the day with some very special trucks: Blaze's family! His little sister Sparkle and their parents join him in a race against Crusher to prove they're the world's fastest family! During the race, Pickle tells Crusher knock-knock jokes about Blaze's family. STEM Concept: Estimate Songs: "The Blaze Family", "Estimation", "The Blaze Family (Reprise)" Transformation: Wrecking ball crane (Blaze, Mom, Dad, Sparkle) Crusher Cheat: Taco-blasting robot
99	19	"The Treat Thief"	Bronwyn Dennison	Miden Wood	November 20, 2020	519	0.40
Officers Blaze and AJ land their biggest case yet, to track down the mischievous Treat Thief, and with help from Officer Anna, Officers Blaze and AJ set out to stop the thief and recover every stolen treat with the viewers' help. Special Guest Star: Nia Long as Officer Anna and Georgie Kidder as The Treat Thief STEM Concept: Data Songs: "Police Anthem", "Data", "Police Anthem (Reprise)" Transformation: Police car, Police helicopter
100	20	"The Gold Medal Games"	Marcelo Ortiz	Morgan von Ancken	July 23, 2021	508	0.38
When Crusher sends Team Blaze away from the Gold Medal Games, Blaze and AJ will have to use help from the viewers and their sport smarts to get back and win the gold medal. Meanwhile, Crusher tries to be the best at all sports by doing tricks but ends up failing. Also, Pickle is the coach of the all the games and teaches the sports legends how to be at their best. Special Guest Stars: Billie Jean King as Wheelie Jean King, Chris Paul as Swift Paul, and Abby Wambach as Abby Wamtruck STEM Concept: Sport science Songs: "Let's Blaze", "Science of Sports", "Team Blaze" Transformation: Forklift Crusher Cheats: Rocket Ball, Super Sticky Slime Bot

=== Season 6 (2020–22) ===
No. overall	No. in season	Title	Directed by	Written by	Original release date	Prod. code	U.S. viewers (millions)
101	1	"Big Rig to the Rescue!"	Bronwyn Dennison	Jeff Borkin	December 18, 2020	601	0.57
When three big deliveries are needed all over Axle City, there's only viewer assistance and one monster machine with the power to haul it all: Big Rig Blaze! But he even may not be able to make all the deliveries in time. At the same time and everywhere they go, Crusher tries to be stronger than Blaze but Pickle gives him more heavy stuff which leads to disastrous results. STEM Concept: Mass Songs: "Big Rig Roll", "Mass", "Big Rig Roll (Reprise)" Transformation: Big Rig
102	2	"Dino Derby"	Bronwyn Dennison	Chris Butler	January 29, 2021	603	0.44
The viewer and Dinosaur Blaze teams up with his prehistoric pal Zeg in order to compete in the Dino Derby, but he wonders if the duo has what it takes to outrace the rest and become Dino Derby champions. STEM Concept: Coordinates Songs: "Dino Derby", "Coordinates", "Dino Dance" Transformation: Triceratops
103	3	"The Amazing Stunt Kitty"	Marcelo Ortiz	Morgan von Ancken	February 19, 2021	602	0.49
Darington has a pet and sidekick named Stunt Kitty! But when a big stunt goes wrong, Darington is sent flying away on an out-of-control hot dog stand balloon! It's up to the viewers at home to help Blaze, AJ, and Stunt Kitty save the day! Meanwhile, Crusher tries do his own stunts, but ends up landing on sticky objects. STEM Concept: Acceleration Songs: "Purr-fect Pals", "Time to Move", "Acceleration" Transformation: Hydroplane speedboat
104	4	"Sir Blaze and the Unicorn"	Marcelo Ortiz	Clark Stubbs	March 12, 2021	604	0.41
Blaze and AJ meet 7 magical unicorns of every color of the rainbow, but when one of them, Violet, gets trapped in an unpoppable bubble, they must use the help from the viewers to turn into knights and rescue her from the Big Bad Bubble Swamp. At the same time, Crusher the knight attempts to rescue Pickle the unicorn from a tower, but his plans don't go so well. STEM Concept: Division Songs: "Knights", "Divide", "Knights (Reprise)" Transformation: Fire-breathing dragon
105	5	"Sparkle's Racing Badge"	Marcelo Ortiz	Andrew Blanchette	April 23, 2021	606	0.31
It's more Blaze family fun in this high octane, action-packed adventure as the viewer, Blaze and his little sister Sparkle team up to make it back to the Monster Dome in time for a big race against Crusher. STEM Concept: Trajectory Songs: "Rock the Road", "Trajectory" Transformation: High-Speed Train (Blaze and Sparkle) Crusher Cheat: Taker Away Machine, Builder Bot
106	6	"Race to Sky High Mountain"	Bronwyn Dennison	JP Meier	May 28, 2021	605	0.41
At the starting line for the race to Sky High Mountain, one of Crusher's cheats threatens to sideline Blaze, AJ, and Gabby for good by pouring cement on Blaze's tires; to get back in this race, Blaze will need help from the viewers and power tires. Meanwhile, for the second time, Pickle opens a tire store with strange tires. STEM Concept: Adhesion Songs: "We Got the Power", "Adhesion", "We Got the Power (Reprise)" Crusher Cheats: Blaster Jets
107	7	"The Puppy Chase"	Marcelo Ortiz	Clark Stubbs	June 25, 2021	608	0.43
When a big bubble floats away with Gabby's new puppy Chassis while trying to take a bath, she teams up with the viewer, Blaze and AJ to get her back. Meanwhile, Pickle opens up a pet store giving Crusher a pet with strange things. STEM Concept: Elasticity Songs: "Go Go Go", "Elasticity", "Monster Machine Friends" Transformation: Bobsled
108	8	"Firefighters to the Rescue"	Bronwyn Dennison	Kendall Michele Haney	September 3, 2021	611	0.32
When three fire emergencies break out across Axle City, it's up to Blaze to put 'em out – and to do it, he'll use the help from the viewer to transform into the most epic fire rescue vehicles we've ever seen! Meanwhile, Crusher and Pickle are playing firefighters. Crusher tries to put out a pretend fire, with the fire hose but strange things come out instead of water. STEM Concept: Pump Songs: "Fired Up", "Pumps", "Fired Up (Reprise)" Transformation: Fire vehicles: Fire Truck, Fire boat, Super scooper
109	9	"The Construction Contest"	Bronwyn Dennison	Morgan von Ancken	November 15, 2021	607	0.36
The viewer, Blaze, AJ, Gabby, Watts, and Zeg become the ultimate construction crew for an amazing building contest to build the tallest tower in Axle City! When Crusher accidentally send them flying far away from town, it will take all of their construction skills combined to make it back before time runs out. While at the contest, Pickle gives Crusher different disgusting tools that gets Crusher sticky. STEM Contest: Length, Width, and Height Songs: "We Got the Power", "Length! Width! Height!" Transformation: Dump Truck (Zeg), Welding Torch (Watts), Crane (Blaze)
110	10	"Starla's Wild West Birthday"	Marcelo Ortiz	Sam Bissonnette	November 16, 2021	610	0.24
Starla's rootin tootin birthday party turns into a rescue mission when a blue train holding her birthday cake gets diverted off course. Now it's up to the viewer to help Blaze and AJ help Starla catch up to that train and save the cake before it's too late and falls off a huge cliff. Meanwhile, Pickle tries to cheer Crusher up by making things out of balloons, but it appears he's not very good at it. STEM Concept: Inertia Songs: "Let's Blaze: Starla Remix", "Inertia", "Happy Birthday Starla" Transformation: Gold Dredge
111	11	"Race to the Golden Gift"	Lindsay Booth	Morgan von Ancken	November 17, 2021	613	0.26
Blaze and AJ are joined by the viewer, Gabby and all their Monster Machine friends in an incredible race for a shiny golden gift box! But to unlock it, they'll first have to get past Crusher and his fresh batch of cheats. STEM Concept: Prediction Songs: "Time to Move", "Let's Predict" Transformation: Steam engine Crusher Cheats: Gargantuan Guards Gifts: Pogo Stick (AJ), Toy Rocket (Blaze), Purple-Striped Lasso (Starla), Trampoline (Darington), Toy Dinosaur (Zeg), Skateboard (Stripes), Stuffed Elephant (Gabby), Electric Guitar (Watts), and Toy Truck (Crusher)
112	12	"The Tiger Treasure"	David Ruiz	Michael Goldberg	November 18, 2021	614	0.26
With the help of a magical tiger statue, the viewer, Blaze, AJ, and Stripes put their explorer skills to the test as they follow the trail to the fabled Tiger Treasure. Meanwhile, back in Axle City, Crusher tries to do tiger skills but he keeps disturbing animals. STEM Concept: Mirrors Songs: "Tiger Treasure", "Mirrors", "Tiger Treasure (Reprise)" Transformation: Laser
113	13	"The Boingies!"	Lindsay Booth	Kendall Michele Haney	November 19, 2021	615	0.29
When seven adorable critters called Boingies get lost in Axle City, it's up to the viewer to help Blaze and AJ gather them up and get them home safe and sound. Meanwhile, Pickle holds a concert and sings ditties for all his fans and gives Crusher different instruments with strange things every time he plays. STEM Concept: Velocity Songs: "Boingies", "Go Go Go", "Velocity", "Pickle Ditties", "Boingies (Reprise)" Transformation: Bucket Truck
114	14	"The Snow Spectacular"	Lindsay Booth	Rob Tatgenhorst	December 10, 2021	617	0.27
The viewer, Blaze and AJ meet and befriend a white monster machine named Snowby who loves to play in the snow. They will need to stay cool if they hope to get him to the top of a snowy hill in time for a special wintery celebration. Meanwhile, back in Axle City, Pickle starts selling frozen foods, but Crusher keeps snatching it from animals and melts every time he walks to the sun. STEM Concept: Potential Energy Songs: "Rock the Road", "Potential Energy" Transformation: Snowball Launcher
115	15	"Snow Rescue Blaze"	Lindsay Booth	Ellen Martin & Hannah Ferenc	January 28, 2022	619	0.41
Blaze and AJ’s ski trip turns into a rescue mission when Crusher and Pickle become stranded, dangling from a faraway ski lift. With help from the viewers, Blaze and AJ must perform a daring snow rescue to save their friends. STEM Concept: Friction Songs: "Time to Move", "Friction" Transformation: Snow vehicles: Snowcat, Hovercraft, Helicopter
116	16	"Special Mission Blaze"	David Ruiz	JP Meier	February 25, 2022	616	0.39
When a nefarious villain called the Toothbrush Taker steals every toothbrush in Axle City, the viewer, Blaze, AJ, Gabby, Crusher, and Pickle's only chances at saving the day is to have Blaze become: Special Mission Blaze. STEM Concept: Density Songs: "Special Mission Blaze", "Special Mission Blaze (Reprise)"
117	17	"The Fastest of Them All"	David Ruiz	Paulina Orozco	March 4, 2022	618	0.28
When the greedy Queen Fastine casts a spell that makes Blaze and AJ’s friends—Stripes, Watts, Crusher, and Pickle—move slowly, Blaze and AJ need your help to race her for the Green Bottle of Fast Magic and reverse the spell. Special Guest Star: Sherri Shepherd as Queen Fastine STEM Concept: Congruent Songs: "Fastest of Them All", "Congruent", "Fastest of Them All (Reprise)"
118	18	"Megabot!"	David Ruiz	Morgan von Ancken	April 29, 2022	620	0.36
The viewer, Blaze and AJ help their amazing new friend Megabot get to Axle City in time for the big Robot Parade. Meanwhile, Crusher wants his robot to be the leader of the parade, but every time he asks to do a mode it plays jokes on him. STEM Concept: Diameter Songs: "We Got the Power", "Diameter", "Robot Parade" Transformation: Turntable Ladder Truck
119	19	"The Treasure of the Broken Key: A Musical Adventure"	Lindsay Booth	JP Meier	June 23, 2022	621	0.21
In the first ever Blaze musical, the viewer, Blaze, AJ, Crusher and Pickle are on a daring quest to find the pieces of the Broken Key and unlock a secret treasure. Songs: "Treasure of the Broken Key (Title, Main, First Reprise, Second Reprise, & Finale)", "Electric Eels", "Hide and Seek Mermaids", "Strongest Octopus in the Sea" Transformation: Electromagnet
120	20	"Lifeguard Blaze"	David Ruiz	Chris Butler	July 8, 2022	622	0.26
The viewer, Blaze and AJ go on a mission to become lifeguards; it'll take four daring rescues to achieve their official lifeguard badge and only the bravest monster truck has what it takes. Meanwhile, Crusher tries to be a lifeguard and rescue Pickle on a pretend giant wave but ends up grabbing various animals. STEM Concept: Sink or Float Songs: "Lifeguards to the Rescue", "Sink or Float", "Lifeguards to the Rescue (Reprise)" Transformation: Submarine, Lifeguards (Blaze and AJ)
121	21	"Campfire Stories!"	Lindsay Booth	Jeff Borkin	September 12, 2022	623	0.22
It’s campout night under the stars! The viewer, Blaze, AJ, Watts, Gabby, Crusher, and Pickle gather around a campfire to tell the most amazing stories they can imagine. The best part? Whoever tells the best story wins the last marshmallow! Special Guest Star: Richard Kind as Lord Carburetor STEM Concept: Greater than sign
122	22	"Super Wheels"	David Ruiz	Kendall Michele Haney	September 13, 2022	624	0.29
Blaze and AJ are driving around Axle City when they find a pair of special wheels that transform Blaze into SUPER BLAZE! When three trouble robots from outer space land in Axle City, Blaze uses the help from the viewers and his new superpowers to help send them back to their home planet! STEM Concept: Melting, Force, and Acceleration Songs: "Super Wheels", "Super Wheels (Reprise)" Transformation: Superhero (Blaze and AJ)
123	23	"The Great Pizza Race"	Bronwyn Dennison	Michael Goldberg	September 16, 2022 (Note: This episode was first released on Vudu on September 21, 2021.)	609	0.20
It's a head-to-head showdown when the viewer, Blaze and Crusher enter...The Great Pizza Race! Who will deliver all of their pizzas first and win the coveted Great Pizza Trophy? STEM Concept: Simple Machines Songs: "Pizza", "Simple Machines", "Pizza (Reprise)" Transformation: Auger Crusher Cheat: Super Snow Maker
124	24	"Monster Machine Halloween"	Lindsay Booth	Jessica Tsou & JP Meier	October 17, 2022	625	0.20
It’s Halloween in Axle City, and Blaze, AJ, Stripes, Starla, Zeg, and the viewer are competing in the Great Halloween Race. The first racer to cross the finish line wins the biggest, tastiest goody bag ever. However, they’ll have to watch out for Crusher’s tricks if they want to claim the prize. STEM Concept: Impacts Songs: "Halloween Race", "Impacts", "Halloween Race (Reprise)" Costumes: Dragon (Blaze), Astronaut (AJ), Robot (Starla), Mummy (Zeg), Shark (Stripes), Crusher (Chicken), Joe and Gus (Pirate and Cowboy), and Pickle (Bathtub)
125	25	"A Blazing Amazing Christmas"	David Ruiz	JP Meier	November 28, 2022	626	0.19
It's Christmas Eve and the viewer, Blaze, AJ, Crusher, Pickle, and all their other friends are helping Santa ready his sleigh for delivery. But when Crusher discovers he won't get a present this year, Blaze and AJ offer to help him do enough kind deeds to earn a gift and three stars. Special Guest Star: Bob Joles as Santa Claus STEM Concept: Counting Songs: "Rev the Halls", "Counting Christmas", "Monster Machine Christmas"
126	26	"Big Rig: Dolphin Delivery"	David Ruiz	JP Meier	December 9, 2022	612	0.18
When a dolphin named Flippy needs help getting back to his family in the ocean, there's only assistance from the home audience and one monster machine with enough power to do the job - Big Rig Blaze! Meanwhile, Pickle is taking pictures, and Crusher wants him to take a picture of his style, but things go wrong when he goes overboard. STEM Concept: Water Songs: "Big Rig Roll", "Water", "Big Rig Roll (Reprise)" Transformation: Big Rig

=== Season 7 (2022–24) ===
No. overall	No. in season	Title	Directed by	Written by	Original release date	Prod. code	U.S. viewers (millions)
127	1	"Sparkle's Big Rescue"	Lindsay Booth	JP Meier	September 14, 2022	701	0.27
When Crusher sends Blaze and AJ away with one of his latest cheats, his little sister Sparkle and the viewer come to save the day and bring her brother and AJ back in time so they can race together to win the Teamwork Trophy! STEM Concept: Chain Reaction Songs: "Blaze On (featuring Sparkle)", "Chain Reaction" Crusher Cheat: Bye-Bye Copter
128	2	"Mail Truck Blaze"	David Ruiz	Morgan von Ancken	September 15, 2022	702	0.24
When three big mail deliveries are needed around the world, there's only assistance from the home audience and one monster machine who can deliver it all, Mail Truck Blaze! He and AJ will swim across seas, climb mountains and venture to the Monster Dome, because mail trucks ALWAYS deliver. Meanwhile, Crusher pretends to be a mail carrier to deliver Pickle a letter up high instead of a ladder, but things go wrong. STEM Concept: Waves Songs: "Mail Truck Anthem", "Waves", "Mail Truck Anthem (Reprise)" Transformation: Mail truck
129	3	"Knights in Sparkling Armor"	David Ruiz	Ashley Griffis	November 11, 2022	704	0.23
When Crusher and Pickle are trapped inside a cage over a bubbling slime swamp, it's up to the viewer, Blaze, his little sister Sparkle, and, AJ to become...Knights! Will they be able to rescue Crusher and Pickle from the swamp before it's too late? STEM Concept: Welding Songs: "Knights with Sparkle", Weld It", "Knights with Sparkle (Reprise)" Transformation: Welding Machine
130	4	"The Snowflake Games"	David Ruiz	JP Meier	December 16, 2022	706	0.23
It's a head-to-head showdown when the viewer, Blaze and Crusher enter... The Snowflake Games! Who will win the most winter sports and receive the prized Snowflake Medal? STEM Concept: Sports Science Songs: "Snowflake Games", "Science of Sports" Transformation: Bobsled
131	5	"Paramedic Power"	Lindsay Booth	Nick "Rocket" Rodriguez	March 3, 2023	705	0.17
Blaze transforms into an ambulance and begins providing aid to Stripes, Starla, and Darington in need, along with the viewer, AJ and Gabby's team of paramedics. Meanwhile, Crusher and Pickle are pretending to be paramedics, and Pickle gives Crusher medical tools that happens to be different stuff. STEM Concept: Paramedic Tools Songs: "Paramedic Power", "Paramedic Power (Reprise)" Transformation: Ambulance (Blaze), Paramedics (AJ and Gabby) Medical problems: Bump on head (Stripes), Bouncing issue (Starla), Hole in tire (Darington)
132	6	"Renewable Energy Racers"	Renato Neves	Ellen Martin	March 10, 2023	709	0.21
AJ and Gabby give Blaze, Starla, Crusher, and Pickle renewable engines just in time for a race. When a sneaky guzzler truck named Gas Guzzler steals their gas, the viewer and the Renewable Energy Team will have to use renewable energy to finish the race. Special Guest Star: Nicole Byer as Gas Guzzler STEM Concept: Renewable Energy Songs: "Renewable Energy Racers", "Renewable Energy Racers (Reprise)"
133	7	"Mission to Mars"	David Ruiz	Morgan von Ancken	March 17, 2023	708	0.19
NASA's Commander Megan is back and she's taking Blaze, AJ, Crusher and Pickle to Mars; but when Crusher accidentally detaches the rocket ship's thrusters, it's up to the viewer to help Blaze and AJ navigate Mars and get those thrusters back. Special Guest Star: K. Megan McArthur Behnken, Ph.D. as Commander Megan STEM Concept: Gravity Songs: "Mars" Transformation: Mars Rover
134	8	"The Flying Contest"	Lindsay Booth	Alex Mack	March 24, 2023	707	0.26
AJ enters a very special competition involving flying machines! When Crusher sends Blaze and AJ flying away from Axle City again, Blaze must use the help from the viewers to get AJ back in time so he can build his ultimate flying invention. STEM Concept: Technology Songs: "Blazing Amazing", "Technology"
135	9	"The Super Skateboard"	Lindsay Booth	Jeff Borkin	March 31, 2023	703	0.19
When Crusher's Grandma returns to Axle City for a very special birthday party, Crusher wants to purchase her a very special gift: an extremely awesome super skateboard! However, he finds out he doesn't have enough money for it. So, the viewer, Blaze and AJ help Crusher do lots of Pickle's different jobs in order to earn money to purchase it. Special Guest Star: Susan Silo as Grammy, Crusher's Grandmother STEM Concept: Sequence Songs: "Get to Work", "The Pizza Sequence" Transformation: Garbage Truck
136	10	"The Baby Robot From Outer Space"	Lindsay Booth	Morgan von Ancken	April 7, 2023	710	0.24
When the Baby Robot from Outer Space turns everyone into babies, it's up to the viewers at home to help Special Mission Blaze, AJ, and Gabby save the day using Blaze's new Special Mission Modes. Special Guest Star: Mr. Lawrence as the Baby Robot STEM Concept: Subtraction Songs: "Special Mission Blaze"
137	11	"The Yucky Ducky"	David Ruiz	Johnny LaZebnik	April 14, 2023	711	0.15
When the Yucky Ducky covers Axle City in icky, sticky grossigoo, it's up to the viewers at home to help Special Mission Blaze, AJ, and Gabby stop her machine and save the world from being grossified. Special Guest Star: Amy Sedaris as the Yucky Ducky STEM Concept: Primary Colors Songs: "Special Mission Blaze", "Yucky Ducky Ditties"
138	12	"The Pillow Pirate"	Renato Neves	JP Meier	April 21, 2023	712	0.17
When a burgling buccaneer steals every pillow in Axle City, it's up to the viewers at home to help Special Mission Blaze, AJ, and Gabby save bedtime. STEM Concept: Addition Songs: "Special Mission Blaze", "Special Mission Addition", "Pillow Pirate Shanties"
139	13	"Super Wheels vs. The Bubblemaker"	David Ruiz	Jeff Borkin	September 11, 2023	717	0.10
Super Wheels to the rescue! When the Bubblemaker starts trapping everything in his trouble bubbles, the viewer, AJ, Blaze and his little sister Sparkle have to become superheroes to save Axle City! Songs: "Super Wheels"
140	14	"Super Wheels vs. The Green Queen"	Renato Neves	Rob Tatgenhorst	September 18, 2023	718	0.11
The Green Queen is turning everything in Axle City... green! Luckily, the viewer, Blaze, Watts, and Darington can transform into superheroes! Can they stop The Green Queen before Axle City is one color forever? Special Guest Star: Kathy Najimy as The Green Queen Songs: "Super Wheels"
141	15	"Super Wheels vs. Pancakeio"	Lindsay Booth	Morgan von Ancken	September 25, 2023	719	0.18
When Pancakeio the Pancake Wizard takes all the pancakes in Axle City, it's up to the viewer, Blaze, Stripes, and Starla to become superheroes; using their Super Wheels, they need to get those pancakes back in time for breakfast! Songs: "Pancakes", "Super Wheels"
142	16	"Arcade Adventure"	Lindsay Booth	Jeff Borkin	January 29, 2024	713	0.12
The viewer, Blaze, AJ, and Sparkle visit an arcade at the carnival and Sparkle wants a glitter rocket which costs 100 tickets, but she is depressed because she has no tickets for it. So, she, Blaze, AJ, and the viewer decide to become video game heroes in order to play enough games and collect 100 tickets to buy it. Meanwhile, Crusher meets Pickle, who is running a pickle arcade, and every time Pickle is about to show him how a game works, Crusher refuses to let him do it and wins the game, but pickles come out instead of tickets, upsetting him as he just wants to play a game that lets him win tickets. STEM Concept: 3D shapes Songs: "Video Game Heroes", "Video Game Heroes (Reprise)" Transformation: Jet plane (Blaze and Sparkle)
143	17	"Pickleworld!"	David Ruiz	Ashley Griffis	January 30, 2024	714	N/A
Pickle, his baby sister Gherkin, and Crusher take Blaze and AJ to Pickleworld; the coolest theme park in the world! But Pickle's family is in danger while trying to go there. It's up to the viewer to help Blaze and AJ help Pickle get his family back together. Meanwhile, Crusher looks after Baby Gherkin and tries to win games by cheating, but his machines won't listen. Special Guest Stars: Stephanie Courtney as Tilly, Judy Greer as Lilly and Baby Gherkin, Steve Little as Ben, Wendi McLendon-Covey as Milly and Frilly, Chris Parnell as Ken and Sven, Jim Rash as Grandpa Pickle STEM Concept: Patterns Songs: "Pickleworld", "Pickleworld (Reprise)", "The Pickle Family Song (Reprise)" Transformation: Spaceship (Blaze and Pickle) Crusher Cheat: Cheat Machine
144	18	"Super Slide Trophy"	Renato Neves	Saeed Crumpler	January 31, 2024	715	N/A
The viewer, Blaze and Gasquatch compete to win the Super Slide Trophy! But when they run into problems along the way, Gasquatch knows just how to solve them... with mud! STEM Concept: Momentum Songs: "Burn Rubber", "Momentum" Crusher Cheat: Robo Piggies
145	19	"Wild West Heroes"	Lindsay Booth	Noëlle Lara	February 1, 2024	716	0.15
Yeehaw! Blaze, AJ, and Starla are at the rootinest, tootinest cowboy party there ever was: The Wild West Picnic! But when the Lunchbox Bandit steals everyone's lunchboxes, it's up to the viewers at home to help our Wild West Heroes to get them back! STEM Concept: Force Songs: "Wild West Picnic", "Force (Wild West Remix)", "Wild West Picnic (Reprise)" Transformation: Steamboat
146	20	"Flying Robot Rescue"	Renato Neves	JP Meier	February 5, 2024	721	0.11
After pressing the Fly, Far, Far Away button by accident, Crusher's robot sends him and Pickle far away; it's up to the viewers at home to help Robot siblings Blaze and Sparkle to rescue them using coding. STEM Concept: Coding Songs: "Robot Power", "Code Go!", "Robot Power (Reprise)" Transformation: Robot (Blaze and Sparkle)
147	21	"The Ice Treasure"	Lindsay Booth	Zaynah Anderson	February 6, 2024	722	0.14
After discovering an ice road that leads to a giant ice treasure, the viewer, Blaze, AJ, Watts and Gabby go an adventure to find out what's inside! But to get to the treasure, they'll have to dodge all of Crusher's chilly cheats along the way! STEM Concept: Wedges Songs: "We're on Our Way", "Wedge" Transformation: Wedge Plow Train (Blaze and Watts)
148	22	"Magic Spell Mayhem"	David Ruiz	Zayna Quader	February 7, 2024	723	0.11
When a magic potion turns Crusher into a chicken, it's up to the viewer to help Blaze, AJ, and Pickle collect three incredible potion ingredients and change him back into a Monster Machine… before he's a chicken forever! STEM Concept: Left and Right Songs: "Let's Blaze", "Left and Right" Transformation: Submersible
149	23	"Valentine's Day Rescue"	David Ruiz	Ashley Griffis	February 8, 2024	720	0.13
It's Valentine's Day! But when Starla, Darington, and Zeg get in trouble on their way to the Valentine's Day party, it's up to the viewer to help Blaze and AJ rescue them. Meanwhile, back in Axle City, Pickle wears special Valentine's Day glasses to do anything, but Crusher only wears them to find different animals. STEM Concept: Match Songs: "Valentine's Day", "It's a Match"
150	24	"The Robot Championship"	Renato Neves	Zayna Quader	April 1, 2024	724	N/A
It's the Robot Championship — and only the fastest, strongest, smartest robot will win! Using coding, can Robot Blaze use the help from the viewers to win enough sports to take home the Robot Championship trophy before Robot Crusher does? Meanwhile, Pickle is the coach of the games and Crusher does lots of sports he's good at too well. STEM Concept: Coding Songs: "Robot Power", "Code Go!", "Robot Power Dance Remix" Transformation: Robot (Blaze and Crusher)
151	25	"Super Smash Race"	Lindsay Booth	Morgan von Ancken	April 2, 2024	725	0.14
Get ready to crash and bash, because today is the Super Smash Race! But when Crusher cheats and sends Zeg, Blaze, and AJ far away, it's up to the viewers at home to help Blaze and AJ help Zeg get back to the race, so he can slam and wham his way to a smash-tacular finish and win the piñata trophy! Meanwhile, Pickle can't open giant boxes and has Crusher smash opening them with pickle-related foods. STEM Concept: Impact Songs: "Go Go Go", "Impact" Transformation: Wrecking Ball (with Zeg the Wrecking Ball) Crusher Cheat: Rocket pizza, Giant Wall Bots
152	26	"School Bus Blaze!"	David Ruiz	JP Meier	April 3, 2024	726	0.10
It's time for school in Axle City, but, when the animal students need help getting to school, it's up to the viewer, Blaze and AJ to save the day by having Blaze become... School Bus Blaze! Meanwhile, back in Axle City, Crusher tries to play school bus but Pickle keeps singing the school bus song incorrectly with animals and foods, leaving Crusher to correct him. STEM Concept: Signs Songs: "School Bus Blaze", "Signs", "School Bus Blaze (Reprise)" Transformation: School Bus

=== Season 8 (2024–25) ===
This season was split in half, with the second half moving to the ninth season. Production for season 8 ran from July 2022 through November 2025. These two seasons contain 28 episodes, 38 new songs and 25 transformations.

No. overall	No. in season	Title	Directed by	Written by	Original release date	Prod. code	U.S. viewers (millions)
153	1	"The Pirate Grand Prix"	Renato Neves	Morgan von Ancken	April 4, 2024	801	N/A
It's Pegwheel's first race — and who better to join him than Pirate Blaze, Pirate AJ, and the viewer! Can they beat Crusher to the trophy and prove they're the best racers on the seven seas, or will strong winds and high altitudes get the better of them? STEM Concept: Altitude Songs: "The Pirate Grand Prix", "Altitude", "The Pirate Grand Prix (Reprise)" Transformation: Pirate Planes (Blaze and Pegwheel) Crusher Cheat: Robo Crabs, Sky Sharks
154	2	"Video Game Land: A Monster Machine Super Special"	Lindsay Booth & David Ruiz	Jeff Borkin	June 24, 2024	802-803 (997)	N/A
155	3	"Video Game Land: A Monster Machine Super Special"	Lindsay Booth & David Ruiz	Jeff Borkin	June 24, 2024	802-803 (997)	N/A
After a race, the viewer, Blaze, AJ and Crusher find themselves stuck in a video game, they must defeat 4 levels and win the game to go home. Can they do it, or will they be stuck inside the game forever? Meanwhile, in the Monster Dome, a cleaning Pickle finds the video game and he, Stripes, Starla, Darington, Zeg, and Watts find out that Blaze, AJ, and Crusher are inside. Also, Pickle presses all the buttons on the game to make Crusher silly while trying to save him. STEM Concept: Vibration Songs: "Video Game Land", "Vibration", "Monster Machines Ride as a Team", "Video Game Land (Reprise)", "Blaze and the Monster Machines Theme Remix" Note: This is the last episode where Jakari Fraser voices AJ.
156	4	"The Garbage Truck Challenge"	Renato Neves	Ashley Griffis	June 25, 2024	804	N/A
Garbage Truck Blaze is back, and this time, he, AJ, the viewer and Garbage Truck Crusher are going head-to-head in the Garbage Truck Challenge. Will Blaze compress up to 25 garbage bags before Crusher, or will Crusher finally crush the competition fair and square? STEM Concept: Compression Songs: "Garbage Truck Power", "Compression", "Garbage Truck Power (Reprise)" Transformation: Garbage truck Crusher Cheat: Giant Stinky Stomper Note: Ayden Elijah joins the voice cast, providing the new voice for AJ.
157	5	"Monster Machine Rescue Team"	Lindsay Booth	JP Meier	June 26, 2024	805	N/A
Meeting Axle City's team of rescue vehicles: The Monster Machine Rescue Team; when Blaze and AJ decide to join the team, they and the viewer must complete three rescues to earn their monster machine rescue badge. Meanwhile, Pickle gives Crusher his badge that turns out to be numerous foods appearing out of nowhere. STEM Concept: Pressure Songs: "Monster Machine Rescue Team", "Pressure", "Monster Machine Rescue Team (Reprise)" Transformations: Police car, Ambulance, Fire truck
158	6	"Trick or Treat Treasure"	Renato Neves	Ashley Griffis	October 21, 2024	810	N/A
It's Halloween in Axle City, and when Crusher accidentally over pumps his inflatable big pumpkin causing Blaze, his little sister Sparkle, and AJ to be sent far away, they and the viewer hear about a magical Trick or Treat Treasure and set out on a spook-tacular treasure hunt to find it! But they better hurry before the pumpkin closes at midnight! Meanwhile, Crusher and Pickle go trick or treating, but Pickle gets it wrong after they came to every house. STEM Concept: Camouflage Songs: "Burn Rubber (Remix)", "Camouflage" Costumes: Dinosaur (Blaze) Pirate (AJ), Unicorn (Sparkle), King (Crusher), Hot dog (Pickle)
159	7	"Tire Trouble!"	David Ruiz	Ellen Martin	October 22, 2024	806	N/A
After Blaze gets brand new tires due to his old ones get worn out and ripped, Stripes, Starla, and Darington all decide to get new tires too. But after a truck hits the speed bump, the watermelon makes the tire changing machine go haywire and give Stripes, Starla, and Darington out-of-control SILLY tires! Now it's up to the viewers at home to help Blaze, AJ, and Gabby rescue them. Meanwhile, Pickle is painting things that he sees. Crusher wants Pickle to paint him but he only paints what's gonna happen to him. STEM Concept: Vertical & Horizontal Songs: "Go Go Go", "Vertical & Horizontal", "Blaze On (Reprise)" Transformation: Helicopter New tire appointments: Tires worn out and ripped (Blaze), Bouncy bunny rabbit tires (Darington), Slippery soap tires (Stripes), Balloon tires (Starla)
160	8	"Tool Truck Blaze"	Renato Neves	Zayna Quader	October 23, 2024	807	N/A
Zeg, Darington, and Starla need help! Three big emergencies break out, it's up to the viewers at home to help Blaze and AJ save the day by having Blaze become: Tool Truck Blaze! Equipped with a toolbox full of amazing tools, Blaze and AJ are ready to hammer, drill and saw through any obstacle in their way! Tool Truck Power! Meanwhile, Crusher and Pickle are playing at Crusher's playground. Pickle is using tools to do different things, but after Crusher teaches him how to do it, his machine pops usual stuff. STEM Concept: Tools: Hammers, wrenches, and circular saws Songs: "Tool Truck Power", "Tool Truck Power (Reprise)" Transformation: Tool Truck
161	9	"Blaze's First Race"	David Ruiz	Morgan von Ancken	October 24, 2024	809	N/A
While Blaze, AJ, Starla, Darington, and Zeg are going for a drive at the park, Stripes finds a photo album in a tree which has pictures of them when they were little. Blaze, AJ, Stripes, Starla, Darington, and Zeg then remember their first ever race together, back when they were little monster machines and a kid with BIG dreams of becoming racers! Along the way, they and the viewer meet Crusher for the first time. Meanwhile, Crusher meets Pickle for the first time and they quickly become best friends. Pickle cheers for Crusher, but this results in him having his very first string of bad luck. He also learns the word cheating for the first time. Note: This episode was produced in celebration of Blaze being on air for 10 years. STEM Concepts: Centripetal Force, Pendulum, and Mass Song: "We May Be Small, But We Can Do It All!"
162	10	"Get the Letters to Santa!"	David Ruiz	Ellen Martin	December 2, 2024	812	N/A
When Stripes, Starla, Darington, Zeg, and Watts' letters to Santa go undelivered thanks to the wind making a reindeer delivering letters, the viewer, AJ, Blaze, and his little sister Sparkle set out on an adventure to the North Pole to deliver them themselves. Meanwhile, Pickle tries to get Crusher in the Christmas spirit but gets the Jingle Bells song wrong. Special Guest Star: Bob Joles as Santa Claus STEM Concepts: Navigation Songs: "Letters to Santa", "Monster Machine Christmas" Transformation: Christmas Wrecking Ball Cranes (Blaze and Sparkle) Christmas gifts: Racetrack inside a snow globe (Blaze and Sparkle), Toy robot (AJ), Drum set (Gabby), Tiger stuffed animal (Stripes), Rainbow lasso (Starla), Bubble gum (Darington), Blocks (Zeg), Electric guitar (Watts), Board game (Crusher), Green mustache (Pickle)
163	11	"The Snow, Sea, Sky Race"	Lindsay Booth	JP Meier	February 3, 2025	808	N/A
The viewer, Blaze, AJ, and Crusher face off in an off-road showdown: the Snow, Sea, Sky Race! The trucks must speed through the snow, swim through the sea, and soar to a finish line in the sky! Will Blaze win the trophy? Or will Crusher be the all-terrain champion? Meanwhile, Pickle drives in different vehicles, and Crusher tries to make them go but the usual stuff comes out. STEM Concepts: Designing Songs: "Snow, Sea, Sky Race", "Snow Sea, Sky Race (Reprise)" Transformations: Continuous Track Rotary Snowplow, Planning Hull Water Jet, Doppler Radar Delta-Wing Jet Plane Crusher Cheat: Stinky Sky Skunk
164	12	"The Super Snowman Contest"	Lindsay Booth	Morgan von Ancken	February 4, 2025	811	N/A
It's a snow day in Axle City, and Blaze and AJ are competing in the Super Snowman Contest; but when Crusher sends them away with balloons, Blaze and AJ need your help to brave the elements to make it back in time to win. Meanwhile, Pickle is reading instructions on how to work his Snow Maker Machine, but Crusher refuses to listen and presses colors to make different snowmen instead of the snow. STEM Concepts: Cohesion Songs: "Ride of Our Lives", "Cohesion" Transformation: Snow Blower
165	13	"Space Mission Blaze"	Renato Neves	Ashley Griffis	February 5, 2025	813	N/A
When Stripes, Zeg, and Watts get launched into outer space on out-of-control jetpacks thanks to a balloon pressing a button, Astronauts Blaze and AJ need your help to blast off to save them! Back at the Monster Dome, Pickle tests out his pickle rocket and Crusher wants to fly to the planets, but Pickle keeps mishearing him. STEM Concepts: Planets Songs: "Astronauts to the Rescue", "Astronauts to the Rescue (Reprise)" Transformation: Mars Rover

=== Season 9 (2025) ===
The episodes of this season were originally produced for the eighth season, but were shifted into this season.

No. overall	No. in season	Title	Directed by	Written by	Original release date	Prod. code	U.S. viewers (millions)
166	1	"Dino Smash!"	Lindsay Booth	Jeff Borkin	February 6, 2025	814	N/A
When Zeg floats away on a kite, the viewer, Blaze, and AJ must team up with Zeg's three sisters Meg, Peg, and Egg to rescue him. Meanwhile, Crusher and Pickle visit a dinosaur playground, but Fluffy the T. Rex joins in causing Crusher trouble. STEM Concepts: Demolition Songs: "Dino Smash", "Demolition", "Dino Smash (Reprise)" Blaze, Meg, Peg, and Egg saved Monster Machine in order: Zeg
167	2	"Pit Crew Power"	David Ruiz	Morgan von Ancken	May 5, 2025	815	N/A
Blaze is racing in the Pit Stop Power Race with the viewer, AJ and Gabby as his pit crew, but Crusher is also in the race and with his Pickle Pit Crew, he's determined to win. Will Blaze win the race, or will Crusher pit-stop Blaze? During the race, Pickle fixes Crusher into making different parts. STEM Concepts: Elements Songs: "Pit Crew Power", "Elements" Transformations: Pit Crew (AJ and Gabby) Crusher Cheat: Laser Bats, Meatball-Maker Robot
168	3	"The Weather Machine"	Renato Neves	Ashley Griffis	May 6, 2025	816	N/A
It's race day in Axle City, but Crusher has stolen Gabby's Weather Machine and is using it to cheat up a storm. Blaze, AJ and Gabby will need your help to weather Crusher's cheats to win the race and get Gabby's machine back. During the race, Pickle is a meteorologist for the race and gives weather catchphrases a lot of puns. STEM Concepts: Gauges Songs: "We're on Our Way!", "Gauges", "Blaze On (Finale)" Transformation: Submarine
169	4	"The Rocketship Ride"	Lindsay Booth	Sascha Paladino	May 7, 2025	817	N/A
Darington can't wait to ride the Great Rocketship Ride, the tallest, fastest carnival ride in all of Axle City. But when his tickets blow away due to the jack-in-the-box popping up, he, Blaze and AJ need your help on an epic adventure to retrieve them. Meanwhile, back at the carnival, Pickle lets Crusher take his turn and Crusher ends up going on rides that have different things. STEM Concepts: Apex Songs: "Time to Move", "Apex" Transformation: Jetboat
170	5	"The Great Bedtime Race"	David Ruiz	Alyson Piekarsky	May 8, 2025	818	N/A
It's nighttime in Axle City and the viewer, Blaze and AJ stumble upon the race of their dreams, the Great Bedtime Race in Bedtime Land, but Crusher is also in the race and he won't rest until he wins. During the race, Pickle is sleeping and follows Crusher. Crusher asks Pickle what's he doing while sleeping but strange things end up coming into his dreams. STEM Concepts: Potential Energy Songs: "The Great Bedtime Race", "Potential Energy", "The Great Bedtime Race (Reprise)" Transformation: Bedtime Racers (Blaze and AJ), Bouncy bed
171	6	"Ice Cream Team"	Renato Neves	Analise McNeill	September 8, 2025	819	N/A
The viewer, AJ, and Ice Cream Truck Blaze must help out in three big ice cream emergencies by having Blaze transform into three ice cream vehicles, an Ice Cream Helicopter, an Ice Cream Submarine and an Ice Cream Rocketship. Meanwhile, Pickle is at his Ice Cream Shop and gives Crusher 10 karate cookie dough. STEM Concepts: Diameter Songs: "Ice Cream", "Ice Cream (Reprise)" Ice Cream Transformations: Helicopter, Submarine, Rocketship
172	7	"The Dragon Game"	Lindsay Booth	Morgan von Ancken	September 9, 2025	820	N/A
At the board game store, Blaze, AJ, Crusher and Pickle are magically transported into an enchanted board game called The Dragon Game; the four friends must use the help of the viewers to overcome the game's dragon-themed challenges to win. Songs: "The Dragon Game"
173	8	"Monster Machines at the Movies"	David Ruiz	Jeff Borkin	September 10, 2025	821	N/A
Time for a monster machine movie party at the movie theater; the viewer, AJ, Blaze, his little sister Sparkle, and their parents watch three movies, a superhero movie, an astronaut movie and a detective movie, to earn a special surprise reward. Meanwhile, Pickle tries to tell Crusher not to use his phone while watching the three movies, but he doesn't listen causing Crusher to have food on him as punishment. Note: This is the last speaking role of the Blaze Family. Special Guest Star: John O'Hurley as The Movie Narrator STEM Concepts: Different Songs: "Monster Machines at the Movies", "Monster Machines at the Movies (Reprise)"
174	9	"Sea Turtle Submarine"	Renato Neves	Paulina Orozco	September 11, 2025	822	N/A
Blaze and AJ are at the beach when they meet an adorable new friend, Shelly the sea turtle; when Shelly cannot find her way home to the Seaweed Forest, Blaze turns into a Sea Turtle Submarine to help lead the way with the viewer's help. Meanwhile, Crusher and Pickle are swimming underwater, Pickle does a documentary, but Crusher can't find any sea creatures, but he gets absorbed by food fish. STEM Concepts: Sea Turtles Songs: "Sea Turtle Power", "Sea Turtle Power (Reprise)" Transformation: Sea Turtle Submarine
175	10	"The Clean Machine"	Lindsay Booth	Mario López-Cordero	September 15, 2025	823	N/A
When all of Blaze's Monster Machines friends end up in messy trouble, the viewer, AJ, and Blaze must save them by having Blaze transform into the soapiest, sudsiest cleaning machine of all time, Clean Machine Blaze. As Crusher watches Blaze and AJ go, he goes in Pickle's turbo tub and gives him different objects. Note: This is Starla and Zeg's final speaking roles in the series. STEM Concepts: Disintegration Songs: "Clean Machine", "Disintegration" Transformation: Clean Machine
176	11	"The Great Train Race"	David Ruiz	Jeff Borkin	September 16, 2025	824	N/A
Blaze becomes a high-speed train for The Great Train Race; he and AJ must use the viewer's help to win the Golden Train Trophy against Crusher, who as always is determined to cheat and knock him off track. STEM Concepts: Racing placements Songs: "The Great Train Race", "Place in the Race", "The Great Train Race (Reprise)" Transformation: High-Speed Train (Blaze and Crusher)
177	12	"Breakfast Bots"	Renato Neves	Rachel Silverman & Morgan von Ancken	September 17, 2025	825	N/A
In their final miniseries episode, it is breakfast time and Pickle has robots to help him whip up a great meal, the Breakfast Bots; when Crusher makes them grow too big due to pressing the green button on Pickle's remote control, they start blasting giant breakfast foods everywhere; Robot Blaze and AJ need your help to stop the bots to save the city. STEM Concepts: Debugging Songs: "Robot Power", "Debug It" Transformation: Robot
178	13	"The Far, Far Away Machine"	Lindsay Booth	Jehan Madhani	September 18, 2025	826	N/A
In their final race and 22-minute episode, Crusher uses Gabby's Far, Far Away Machine to send Stripes, Darington, and Watts far away from the race at the Monster Dome; Blaze, AJ, and Gabby need your help to rescue their friends from the Ice Age, Ancient Egypt and Medieval Times. Note: This episode marks Darington, Stripes, Watts, and Gabby's last speaking roles in the series, and the final episode where Gabby is voiced by Micaiah Chen. STEM Concepts: Ancient tools: Wedges, Pulleys, and Catapults Songs: "We're Going Far, Far Away" Blaze saved Monster Machines in order: Stripes, Watts and Darington
179	14	"Christmas Power!: A Monster Machine Super Special"	Renato Neves & David Ruiz	Jeff Borkin	December 1, 2025	827-828 (996)	N/A
180	15	"Christmas Power!: A Monster Machine Super Special"	Renato Neves & David Ruiz	Jeff Borkin	December 1, 2025	827-828 (996)	N/A
In their final ever episode, Santa's reindeer team - Comet, Dancer, Cupid, and Twinkle - get swept away in a Christmas Eve snowstorm and Blaze and AJ need your help to use the power of Santa's magic hat to rescue them. Note: This is the series finale. New cinematic lighting was introduced for this episode, and this episode marks the final time Ayden Elijah and Leo Abelo Perry provide AJ's speaking and singing voices as no other kid actors will provide his speaking and singing voices as the series has come to an end. STEM Concepts: Circumference Songs: Christmas Power, Catch That Reindeer, Let My Light Shine, Jingle Blaze Blaze saved Santa's reindeer in order: Comet, Dancer, Cupid, and Twinkle

== Shorts (2020) ==
- Monster Machine Halloween
- The Monster Machine Christmas Extravaganza
- Blaze Family Photos
- Pickle's Ocean Adventures
- Pickle's Pirate Professionals
