= List of accolades received by Inside Out =

Inside Out accolades
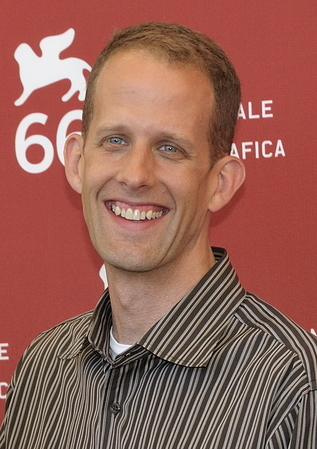
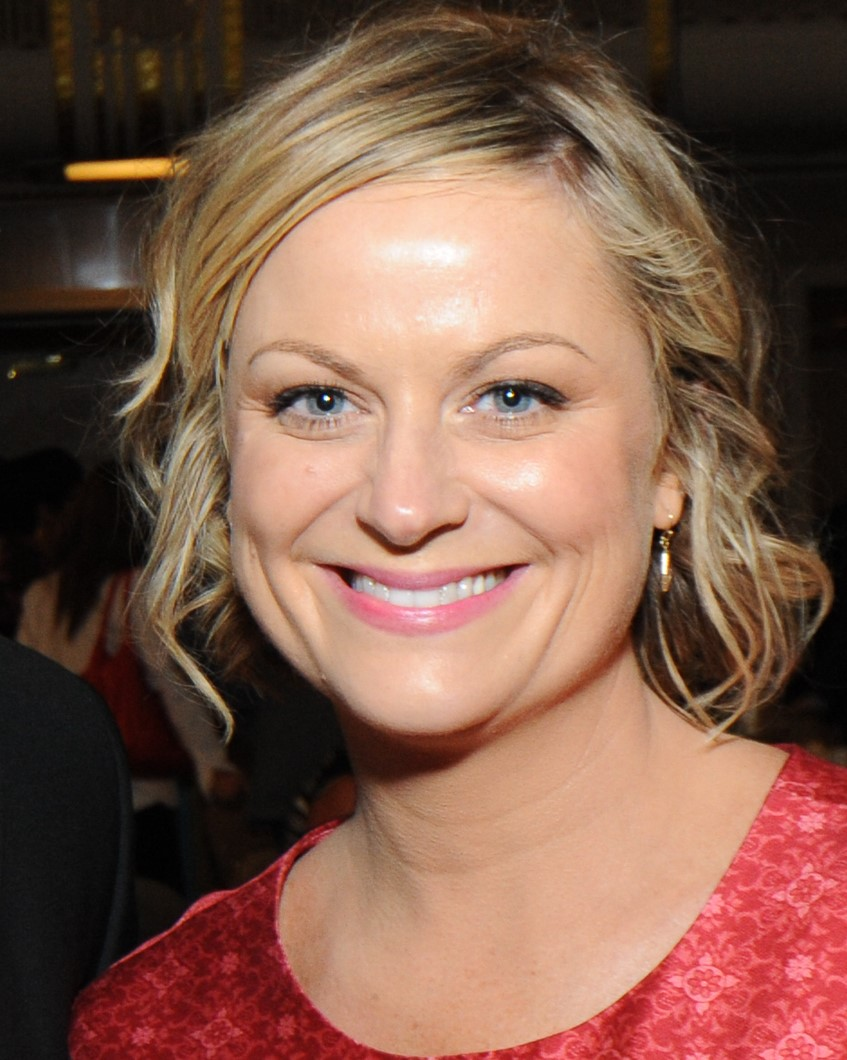
- Pete Docter and Amy Poehler received several awards and nominations for his direction and her voice role, respectively.
Awards and nominations
Award	Wins	Nominations
3D Creative Arts Awards	2	2
AARP Movies for Grownups Awards	1	1
Academy Awards	1	2
Alliance of Women Film Journalists Awards	1	2
American Cinema Editors Awards	1	1
American Film Institute Awards	1	1
Annie Awards	10	14
Artios Awards	1	1
Austin Film Critics Association Awards	3	4
Bodil Awards	0	1
Boston Society of Film Critics Awards	1	1
British Academy Children's Awards	0	2
British Academy Film Awards	1	2
Capri Hollywood International Film Festival	1	1
Chicago Film Critics Association Awards	1	4
Cinema Audio Society Awards	1	1
Critics' Choice Movie Awards	1	3
Dallas–Fort Worth Film Critics Association Awards	1	1
David di Donatello Awards	0	1
Detroit Film Critics Society Awards	0	3
Dublin Film Critics' Circle Awards	1	1
Empire Awards	1	2
Florida Film Critics Circle Awards	1	2
Georgia Film Critics Association Awards	2	3
Golden Globe Awards	1	1
Golden Reel Awards	1	1
Golden Trailer Awards	0	7
Hollywood Film Awards	1	1
Hollywood Music in Media Awards	0	1
Houston Film Critics Society Awards	1	3
International Cinephile Society Awards	1	3
International Film Music Critics Association Awards	1	1
Kansas City Film Critics Circle Awards	1	1
London Film Critics' Circle Awards	0	1
Los Angeles Film Critics Association Awards	1	1
Movieguide Awards	0	1
MTV Movie Awards	1	1
NAACP Image Awards	0	1
National Board of Review Awards	2	2
Nebula Awards	0	1
New York Film Critics Circle Awards	1	1
New York Film Critics Online Awards	1	1
Nickelodeon Kids' Choice Awards	1	2
Online Film Critics Society Awards	1	3
People's Choice Awards	0	3
Producers Guild of America Awards	1	1
Robert Awards	0	1
San Diego Film Critics Society Awards	0	2
San Francisco Film Critics Circle Awards	0	1
Satellite Awards	1	4
Saturn Awards	1	1
Seattle International Film Festival Awards	1	1
St. Louis Film Critics Association Awards	2	5
Teen Choice Awards	0	3
Toronto Film Critics Association Awards	0	1
Village Voice Film Poll	2	2
Visual Effects Society Awards	1	4
Washington D.C. Area Film Critics Association Awards	2	2
Women Film Critics Circle Awards	2	2
World Soundtrack Awards	1	1
Young Artist Awards	1	1

Totals (Note: Certain award groups do not simply award one winner. They acknowledge several different recipients, have runners-up, and have third place. Since this is a specific recognition and is different from losing an award, runner-up mentions are considered wins in this award tally. For simplification and to avoid errors, each award in this list has been presumed to have had a prior nomination.)
- Wins: 64
- Nominations: 125

Inside Out is a 2015 American animated coming-of-age film produced by Pixar Animation Studios and distributed by Walt Disney Studios Motion Pictures. Produced by Jonas Rivera, it was directed by Pete Docter from a screenplay co-written with Meg LeFauve and Josh Cooley. The film stars the voices of Amy Poehler, Phyllis Smith, Richard Kind, Bill Hader, Lewis Black, Mindy Kaling, Kaitlyn Dias, Diane Lane, and Kyle MacLachlan. Inside Out follows the inner workings of the mind of Riley, a young girl who adapts to her family's relocation as five personified emotions administer her thoughts and actions.

Inside Out debuted out of competition at the 68th Cannes Film Festival on May 18, 2015, and was released in the United States on June 19. Produced on a budget of $175 million, Inside Out grossed $858.8 million worldwide, finishing its theatrical run as the seventh-highest-grossing film of 2015. On the review aggregator website Rotten Tomatoes, the film holds an approval rating of 98% based on 385 reviews.

Inside Out garnered awards and nominations in various categories with particular recognition for its writing and musical score. It received two nominations at the 88th Academy Awards, including Best Original Screenplay. The film won Best Animated Feature. Inside Out won ten of fourteen nominations at the 43rd Annie Awards. At the 69th British Academy Film Awards, it was nominated for Best Original Screenplay and won Best Animated Film. The film received three nominations at the 21st Critics' Choice Awards and won Best Animated Feature. Inside Out won Best Animated Feature Film at the 73rd Golden Globe Awards. Various critic circles also picked Inside Out as the best animated feature film of the year. In addition, both the American Film Institute and the National Board of Review selected Inside Out as one of the top-ten films of 2015.

== Accolades ==
Accolades received by Inside Out (2015 film)
Award	Date of ceremony	Category	Recipient(s)	Result	Ref.
3D Creative Arts Awards	February 10, 2016	Best Feature Film – Animation	Inside Out	Won	
3D Creative Arts Awards	February 10, 2016	Best Stereoscopic Feature Film – Animation	Inside Out	Won	
AARP Movies for Grownups Awards	February 8, 2016	Best Movie for Grownups Who Refuse to Grow Up	Inside Out	Won	
Academy Awards	February 28, 2016	Best Animated Feature	Pete Docter and Jonas Rivera	Won	
Academy Awards	February 28, 2016	Best Original Screenplay	Pete Docter, Meg LeFauve, Josh Cooley, and Ronnie del Carmen	Nominated	
Alliance of Women Film Journalists Awards	January 12, 2016	Best Original Screenplay	Ronnie del Carmen, Josh Cooley, Pete Docter, and Meg LeFauve	Nominated	
Alliance of Women Film Journalists Awards	January 12, 2016	Best Animated Film	Inside Out	Won	
American Cinema Editors Awards	January 29, 2016	Best Edited Animated Feature Film	Kevin Nolting	Won	
American Film Institute Awards	December 16, 2015	Top 10 Films of the Year	Inside Out	Won (Note: This award does not have a single winner, but recognizes multiple films.)	
Annie Awards	February 6, 2016	Best Animated Feature	Inside Out	Won	
Annie Awards	February 6, 2016	Outstanding Achievement for Animated Effects in an Animated Production	Amit Baadkar, Dave Hale, Paul Mendoza, and Vincent Serritella	Nominated	
Annie Awards	February 6, 2016	Outstanding Achievement for Character Animation in a Feature Production	Allison Rutland	Won	
Annie Awards	February 6, 2016	Outstanding Achievement for Character Animation in a Feature Production	Travis Hathaway	Nominated	
Annie Awards	February 6, 2016	Outstanding Achievement for Character Design in a Feature Production	Albert Lozano and Chris Sasaki	Won	
Annie Awards	February 6, 2016	Outstanding Achievement for Directing in a Feature Production	Pete Docter	Won	
Annie Awards	February 6, 2016	Outstanding Achievement for Editorial in a Feature Production	Kevin Nolting	Won	
Annie Awards	February 6, 2016	Outstanding Achievement for Music in a Feature Production	Michael Giacchino	Won	
Annie Awards	February 6, 2016	Outstanding Achievement for Production Design in an Animated Feature Production	Ralph Eggleston	Won	
Annie Awards	February 6, 2016	Outstanding Achievement for Storyboarding in a Feature Production	Tony Rosenast	Won	
Annie Awards	February 6, 2016	Outstanding Achievement for Storyboarding in a Feature Production	Domee Shi	Nominated	
Annie Awards	February 6, 2016	Outstanding Achievement for Writing in a Feature Production	Josh Cooley, Pete Docter, and Meg LeFauve	Won	
Annie Awards	February 6, 2016	Outstanding Achievement for Voice Acting in a Feature Production	Amy Poehler	Nominated	
Annie Awards	February 6, 2016	Outstanding Achievement for Voice Acting in a Feature Production	Phyllis Smith	Won	
Artios Awards	January 21, 2016	Animation	Natalie Lyon and Kevin Rehe	Won	
Austin Film Critics Association Awards	December 29, 2015	Top Ten Films	Inside Out	6th place (Note: Tied with Ex Machina (2014))	
Austin Film Critics Association Awards	December 29, 2015	Best Original Screenplay	Josh Cooley, Pete Docter, and Meg LeFauve	Won	
Austin Film Critics Association Awards	December 29, 2015	Best Score	Michael Giacchino	Nominated	
Austin Film Critics Association Awards	December 29, 2015	Best Animated Film	Inside Out	Won	
Bodil Awards	March 5, 2016	Best American Film	Inside Out	Nominated	
Boston Society of Film Critics Awards	December 7, 2015	Best Animated Film	Inside Out	Won (Note: Tied with Anomalisa (2015))	
British Academy Children's Awards	November 22, 2015	Kid's Vote — Film	Inside Out	Nominated	
British Academy Children's Awards	November 22, 2015	Feature Film	Ronnie del Carmen, Pete Docter, and Jonas Rivera	Nominated	
British Academy Film Awards	February 14, 2016	Best Original Screenplay	Josh Cooley, Pete Docter, and Meg LeFauve	Nominated	
British Academy Film Awards	February 14, 2016	Best Animated Film	Pete Docter	Won	
Capri Hollywood International Film Festival	January 2, 2016	Best Animated Film	Inside Out	Won	
Chicago Film Critics Association Awards	December 16, 2015	Best Film	Inside Out	Nominated	
Chicago Film Critics Association Awards	December 16, 2015	Best Original Screenplay	Josh Cooley, Pete Docter, and Meg LeFauve	Nominated	
Chicago Film Critics Association Awards	December 16, 2015	Best Original Score	Michael Giacchino	Nominated	
Chicago Film Critics Association Awards	December 16, 2015	Best Animated Film	Inside Out	Won	
Cinema Audio Society Awards	February 20, 2016	Outstanding Achievement in Sound Mixing in a Motion Picture – Animated	Joel Iwataki, Tom Johnson, Mary Jo Lang, Doc Kane, and Michael Semanick	Won	
Critics' Choice Movie Awards	January 17, 2016	Best Original Screenplay	Josh Cooley, Pete Docter, and Meg LeFauve	Nominated	
Critics' Choice Movie Awards	January 17, 2016	Best Animated Feature	Inside Out	Won	
Critics' Choice Movie Awards	January 17, 2016	Best Comedy	Inside Out	Nominated	
Dallas–Fort Worth Film Critics Association Awards	December 14, 2015	Best Animated Film	Inside Out	Won	
David di Donatello Awards	April 18, 2016	Best Foreign Film	Inside Out	Nominated	
Detroit Film Critics Society Awards	December 14, 2015	Best Film	Inside Out	Nominated	
Detroit Film Critics Society Awards	December 14, 2015	Best Ensemble	Inside Out	Nominated	
Detroit Film Critics Society Awards	December 14, 2015	Best Screenplay	Josh Cooley, Pete Docter, and Meg LeFauve	Nominated	
Dublin Film Critics' Circle Awards	December 22, 2015	Best Film	Inside Out	Won	
Empire Awards	March 20, 2016	Best Animated Film	Inside Out	Won	
Empire Awards	March 20, 2016	Best Comedy	Inside Out	Nominated	
Florida Film Critics Circle Awards	December 23, 2015	Best Original Screenplay	Josh Cooley, Pete Docter, and Meg LeFauve	Nominated	
Florida Film Critics Circle Awards	December 23, 2015	Best Animated Film	Inside Out	Won	
Georgia Film Critics Association Awards	January 8, 2016	Best Picture	Inside Out	Nominated	
Georgia Film Critics Association Awards	January 8, 2016	Best Animated Film	Inside Out	Won	
Georgia Film Critics Association Awards	January 8, 2016	Best Original Screenplay	Pete Docter, Meg LeFauve, and Josh Cooley	Won	
Golden Globe Awards	January 10, 2016	Best Animated Feature Film	Inside Out	Won	
Golden Reel Awards	February 27, 2016	Outstanding Achievement in Sound Editing – Sound Effects, Foley, Dialogue and ADR for Animated Feature Film	Ren Klyce and Shannon Mills	Won	
Golden Trailer Awards	May 6, 2015	Best Animation/Family	"Journey – RUS" (Trailer Park, Inc.)	Nominated	
Golden Trailer Awards	May 6, 2015	Best Animation/Family Poster	"First Day" (Trailer Park, Inc.)	Nominated	
Golden Trailer Awards	May 4, 2016	Best Animation/Family	"SW Trailer3 Reaction Video" (Trailer Park, Inc.)	Nominated	
Golden Trailer Awards	May 4, 2016	Best Animation/Family TV Spot	"Dad Mom" (Trailer Park, Inc.)	Nominated	
Golden Trailer Awards	May 4, 2016	Best Radio Spots	"Worlds Radio" (Trailer Park, Inc.)	Nominated	
Golden Trailer Awards	May 4, 2016	Best Radio Spots	"AA Radio" (Trailer Park, Inc.)	Nominated	
Golden Trailer Awards	May 4, 2016	Most Innovative Advertising for a Feature Film	"SW Trailer3 Reaction Video" (Trailer Park, Inc.)	Nominated	
Hollywood Film Awards	November 1, 2015	Animation of the Year	Pete Docter	Won	
Hollywood Music in Media Awards	November 11, 2015	Best Original Score in an Animated Film	Michael Giacchino	Nominated	
Houston Film Critics Society Awards	January 9, 2016	Best Picture	Inside Out	Nominated	
Houston Film Critics Society Awards	January 9, 2016	Best Animated Feature	Inside Out	Won	
Houston Film Critics Society Awards	January 9, 2016	Best Original Score	Michael Giacchino	Nominated	
International Cinephile Society Awards	February 21, 2016	Best Picture	Inside Out	Nominated	
International Cinephile Society Awards	February 21, 2016	Best Original Screenplay	Pete Docter, Meg LeFauve, Josh Cooley, and Ronnie del Carmen	Nominated	
International Cinephile Society Awards	February 21, 2016	Best Animated Film	Inside Out	Won	
International Film Music Critics Association Awards	February 18, 2016	Best Original Score for an Animated Film	Michael Giacchino	Won	
London Film Critics' Circle Awards	January 17, 2016	Film of the Year	Inside Out	Nominated	
Kansas City Film Critics Circle Awards	December 20, 2015	Best Animated Feature	Inside Out	Won	
Los Angeles Film Critics Association Awards	December 6, 2015	Best Animated Film	Inside Out	Runner-up	
Movieguide Awards	February 5, 2016	Best Movies for Families	Inside Out	Nominated	
MTV Movie Awards	April 10, 2016	Best Virtual Performance	Amy Poehler	Won	
NAACP Image Awards	February 5, 2016	Outstanding Writing in a Motion Picture (Film)	Josh Cooley, Pete Docter, and Meg LeFauve	Nominated	
National Board of Review Awards	December 1, 2015	Top Ten Films	Inside Out	Won	
National Board of Review Awards	December 1, 2015	Best Animated Film	Inside Out	Won	
Nebula Awards	May 14, 2016	Ray Bradbury Nebula Award for Outstanding Dramatic Presentation	Pete Docter, Meg LeFauve, Josh Cooley, and Ronnie del Carmen	Nominated	
New York Film Critics Circle Awards	December 2, 2015	Best Animated Film	Inside Out	Won	
New York Film Critics Online Awards	December 6, 2015	Best Animated Feature	Inside Out	Won	
Nickelodeon Kids' Choice Awards	March 12, 2016	Favorite Animated Movie	Inside Out	Nominated	
Nickelodeon Kids' Choice Awards	March 12, 2016	Favorite Voice from an Animated Movie	Amy Poehler	Won	
Online Film Critics Society Awards	December 14, 2015	Best Picture	Inside Out	Nominated	
Online Film Critics Society Awards	December 14, 2015	Best Animated Film	Inside Out	Won	
Online Film Critics Society Awards	December 14, 2015	Best Original Screenplay	Ronnie del Carmen, Josh Cooley, Pete Docter, and Meg LeFauve	Nominated	
People's Choice Awards	January 6, 2016	Favorite Movie	Inside Out	Nominated	
People's Choice Awards	January 6, 2016	Favorite Animated Movie Voice	Amy Poehler	Nominated	
People's Choice Awards	January 6, 2016	Favorite Family Movie	Inside Out	Nominated	
Producers Guild of America Awards	January 23, 2016	Best Animated Motion Picture	Jonas Rivera	Won	
Robert Awards	February 7, 2016	Best American Film	Inside Out	Nominated	
San Diego Film Critics Society Awards	December 14, 2015	Best Animated Film	Inside Out	Nominated	
San Diego Film Critics Society Awards	December 14, 2015	Best Performance by an Ensemble	Inside Out	Nominated	
San Francisco Film Critics Circle Awards	December 13, 2015	Best Animated Feature	Inside Out	Nominated	
Satellite Awards	February 21, 2016	Best Animated or Mixed Media Feature	Inside Out	Won	
Satellite Awards	February 21, 2016	Best Original Screenplay	Josh Cooley, Pete Docter, and Meg LeFauve	Nominated	
Satellite Awards	February 21, 2016	Best Original Score	Michael Giacchino	Nominated	
Satellite Awards	February 21, 2016	Best Sound	Inside Out	Nominated	
Saturn Awards	June 22, 2016	Best Animated Film	Inside Out	Won	
Seattle International Film Festival Awards	June 7, 2015	Golden Space Needle Award – Best Film	Pete Docter	First runner-up	
St. Louis Film Critics Association Awards	December 20, 2015	Best Film	Inside Out	Runner-up	
St. Louis Film Critics Association Awards	December 20, 2015	Best Original Screenplay	Josh Cooley, Pete Docter, and Meg LeFauve	Nominated	
St. Louis Film Critics Association Awards	December 20, 2015	Best Score	Michael Giacchino	Runner-up	
St. Louis Film Critics Association Awards	December 20, 2015	Best Animated Feature	Inside Out	Won	
St. Louis Film Critics Association Awards	December 20, 2015	Best Comedy Film	Inside Out	Nominated	
Teen Choice Awards	August 16, 2015	Choice Summer Movie	Inside Out	Nominated	
Teen Choice Awards	August 16, 2015	Choice Summer Movie Star: Female	Amy Poehler	Nominated	
Teen Choice Awards	August 16, 2015	Choice Movie: Hissy Fit	Lewis Black	Nominated	
Toronto Film Critics Association Awards	December 14, 2015	Best Animated Film	Inside Out	Nominated	
Village Voice Film Poll	December 15, 2015	Best Picture	Inside Out	8th place	
Village Voice Film Poll	December 15, 2015	Best Animated Feature	Inside Out	Won	
Visual Effects Society Awards	February 2, 2016	Outstanding Visual Effects in an Animated Feature	Michael Fong, Paul Mendoza, Victor Navone, and Jonas Rivera	Nominated	
Visual Effects Society Awards	February 2, 2016	Outstanding Animated Performance in an Animated Feature	Alexis Angelidis, Tanja Krampfert, Shawn Krause, and Jacob Merrell	Won	
Visual Effects Society Awards	February 2, 2016	Outstanding Created Environment in an Animated Feature	Amy L. Allen, Eric Andraos, Steve Karski, and Jose L. Ramos Serrano for "Imagination Land"	Nominated	
Visual Effects Society Awards	February 2, 2016	Outstanding Effects Simulations in an Animated Feature	Amit Baadkar, Dave Hale, Vincent Serritella, and Paul Mendoza	Nominated	
Washington D.C. Area Film Critics Association Awards	December 7, 2015	Best Original Screenplay	Josh Cooley, Ronnie del Carmen, Pete Docter, and Meg LeFauve	Won	
Washington D.C. Area Film Critics Association Awards	December 7, 2015	Best Animated Feature	Inside Out	Won	
Women Film Critics Circle Awards	December 18, 2015	Best Family Film	Inside Out	Won	
Women Film Critics Circle Awards	December 18, 2015	Best Animated Female	Amy Poehler	Won	
World Soundtrack Awards	October 24, 2015	Film Composer of the Year	Michael Giacchino (Note: Also for Dawn of the Planet of the Apes (2014), Jupiter Ascending (2015), Jurassic World (2015), and Tomorrowland (2015))	Won	
Young Artist Awards	March 13, 2016	Best Performance in a Voice-over Role – Young Actress (12–21)	Kaitlyn Dias	Won	
