= Paper Biscuit =

Comic book series

Paper Biscuit is a comic book series written and published by Ronnie del Carmen, head of story at Pixar. It centers on Nina, a disorganized girl who has the unnatural ability to stay awake and think coherently in her dreams.

== Plot summary ==
Nina is a young woman whose life is in disarray. She has trouble holding and finding jobs, difficulty with boyfriends, and is constantly on the verge of eviction due to unpaid rent. She has a strange condition which she likens to Alice in Wonderland, in which she is somehow able to stay awake and function rationally while in a dream state. While in her dream world she often tries to uncover clues for getting rich quickly, as it is revealed that in one dream several years ago she sang the numbers to a winning lottery ticket only to later disregard it as silly and thus miss out on a windfall.

In the second volume it is revealed that other people share the same dream world as Nina, and she can interact with them though they usually don't remember. Nina saves a small child having a nightmare from a scary monster, and then subliminally plants orders on a rich person to accidentally leave her an envelope filled with cash at her favorite diner.

== Style ==
The comic has a storyboard sketch-like style. All images are done in pencil and frequently left in their rough draft state. Rather than a consistent panel layout Paper Biscuit experiments with panel size, shape, and placement to assist in story telling. Dream panels tend to have stranger shapes, while waking life panels tend to be more rectangular and standard.
