= Inside Out =

2015 film by Pete Docter

- Theatrical release poster
- Directed by: Pete Docter
- Screenplay by: Pete Docter; Meg LeFauve; Josh Cooley
- Story by: Pete Docter; Ronnie del Carmen
- Produced by: Jonas Rivera
- Starring: Amy Poehler; Phyllis Smith; Lewis Black; Bill Hader; Mindy Kaling; Richard Kind; Kaitlyn Dias; Diane Lane; Kyle MacLachlan
- Cinematography: Patrick Lin (camera); Kim White (lighting)
- Edited by: Kevin Nolting
- Music by: Michael Giacchino
- Production company: Pixar Animation Studios
- Distributed by: Walt Disney Studios; Motion Pictures (Note: Distributed under the Walt Disney Pictures banner.)
- Release dates: May 18, 2015 (Cannes); June 19, 2015 (United States)
- Running time: 95 minutes
- Country: United States
- Language: English
- Budget: $175 million
- Box office: $859.1 million

Inside Out is a 2015 American animated coming-of-age film directed by Pete Docter who co-wrote it with Meg LeFauve and Josh Cooley. Produced by Pixar Animation Studios for Walt Disney Pictures, the film stars the voices of Amy Poehler, Phyllis Smith, Richard Kind, Bill Hader, Lewis Black, Mindy Kaling, Kaitlyn Dias, Diane Lane, and Kyle MacLachlan. Inside Out follows the inner workings of the mind of Riley, a young girl who adapts to her family's relocation as five personified emotions administer her thoughts and actions.

Docter conceived Inside Out in October 2009 after observing changes in his daughter's personality as she grew older. The project was subsequently green-lit, and Docter and co-director Ronnie del Carmen developed the story, while consulting psychologists and neuroscientists in an effort to accurately portray the mind. Development took five-and-a-half years on a budget of approximately $175 million. Significant changes to the film's story and characters delayed the film's production schedule.

Inside Out debuted at the 68th Cannes Film Festival on May 18, 2015, and was released in the United States on June 19. It received critical acclaim for its craftsmanship, screenplay, subject matter, plot, and vocal performances—particularly those of Poehler, Smith, Kind, Hader, Kaling, and Black. The National Board of Review and the American Film Institute named Inside Out one of the top-ten films of 2015. It grossed $859.1 million worldwide, finishing its theatrical run as the seventh-highest-grossing film of 2015. The film was nominated for two awards at the 88th Academy Awards, winning Best Animated Feature, and received numerous other accolades. Philosophical journal Film and Philosophy recognized Inside Out as one of the best animated films ever made. A sequel, Inside Out 2, was released in 2024.

== Plot ==
In the mind of a young girl named Riley Andersen are five personified emotions that influence her actions: Joy, Sadness, Fear, Disgust, and Anger. They process her experiences into memories stored as colored orbs in "Headquarters", her conscious mind, and send them into long-term memory each night. The aspects of the most important "core memories" within her personality take the form of five floating islands. Joy acts as the leader and tries to limit Sadness's influence, perceiving her as an unnecessary burden for Riley.

At age 11, Riley moves from Minnesota to San Francisco for her father's new job. On Riley's first day at her new school, Sadness retroactively saddens joyous memories, making Riley cry in front of her class. This creates Riley's first sad core memory. Joy tries to dispose of it using a pneumatic tube but knocks loose the other core memories during a struggle with Sadness, disabling the personality islands. Joy, Sadness, and the core memories are sucked out of Headquarters. In their absence, Anger, Fear, and Disgust attempt to create new happy core memories but push Riley away from her parents, friends, and favorite activities. Goofball, Friendship, and Hockey Island thus collapse into the Memory Dump, where forgotten things gradually disappear forever.

In the vast long-term memory area, Joy and Sadness encounter Bing Bong, Riley's childhood imaginary friend, who suggests riding the "train of thought" back to Headquarters. They miss it after Bing Bong naively leads them into Abstract Thought. In Imagination Land, which is under heavy renovations, Bing Bong bemoans Riley outgrowing him and rejects Joy's attempts to cheer him up in favor of Sadness's empathy. The trio catches the train, but it stops when Riley goes to sleep. At Dream Productions, Bing Bong is imprisoned in Subconscious for crashing a dream being filmed; Joy and Sadness get themselves arrested and free him as well as Jangles the Clown, Riley's scariest memory, frightening her awake. Meanwhile, Anger inserts an idea bulb into the console to make Riley run away to Minnesota, believing this will form new happy memories.

Honesty Island collapses after Riley steals her mother's credit card, leaving only Family Island and derailing the train. Joy tries to ride a "recall tube" back to Headquarters, but the ground below collapses, plunging her and Bing Bong into the Memory Dump. Joy discovers a sad memory of Riley losing an ice hockey game that turns happy when Riley's parents and friends comfort her. She realizes Sadness's purpose is to alert others when Riley is emotionally overwhelmed. Joy and Bing Bong try to use his song-fueled rocket wagon to escape the Memory Dump, but cannot ascend due to their combined weight. On the third attempt, Bing Bong jumps out of the wagon mid-ascent, fading away as Joy escapes to freedom.

Anger's idea bulb shorts out the console, putting Riley into depression as she boards a bus to Minnesota. Joy and Sadness reunite and return to Headquarters while Family Island nears collapse. Joy hands control of the console to Sadness, who removes the idea bulb, restarting the console and prompting Riley to get off the bus and rush home. Joy, realizing Riley had independently made up her mind about moving to San Francisco, allows Sadness to make the core memories sad. Riley bursts into tears, telling her parents she misses her old life; they comfort her and admit they also miss Minnesota. Sadness and Joy join hands on the console, creating a new core memory that is both happy and sad. A new Family Island forms, representing Riley's acceptance of her life in San Francisco.

One year later, 12-year-old Riley has adapted to her new home, made new friends, and acquired new hobbies. Inside Headquarters, Riley's emotions admire both her new and re-formed personality islands, powered by multicolored core memories that contain mixed emotions, and are given an expanded console allowing them to work as a team. Although they admit slight concern over a red alarm light marked "PUBERTY", they decide that it is not important at the moment.

== Voice cast ==
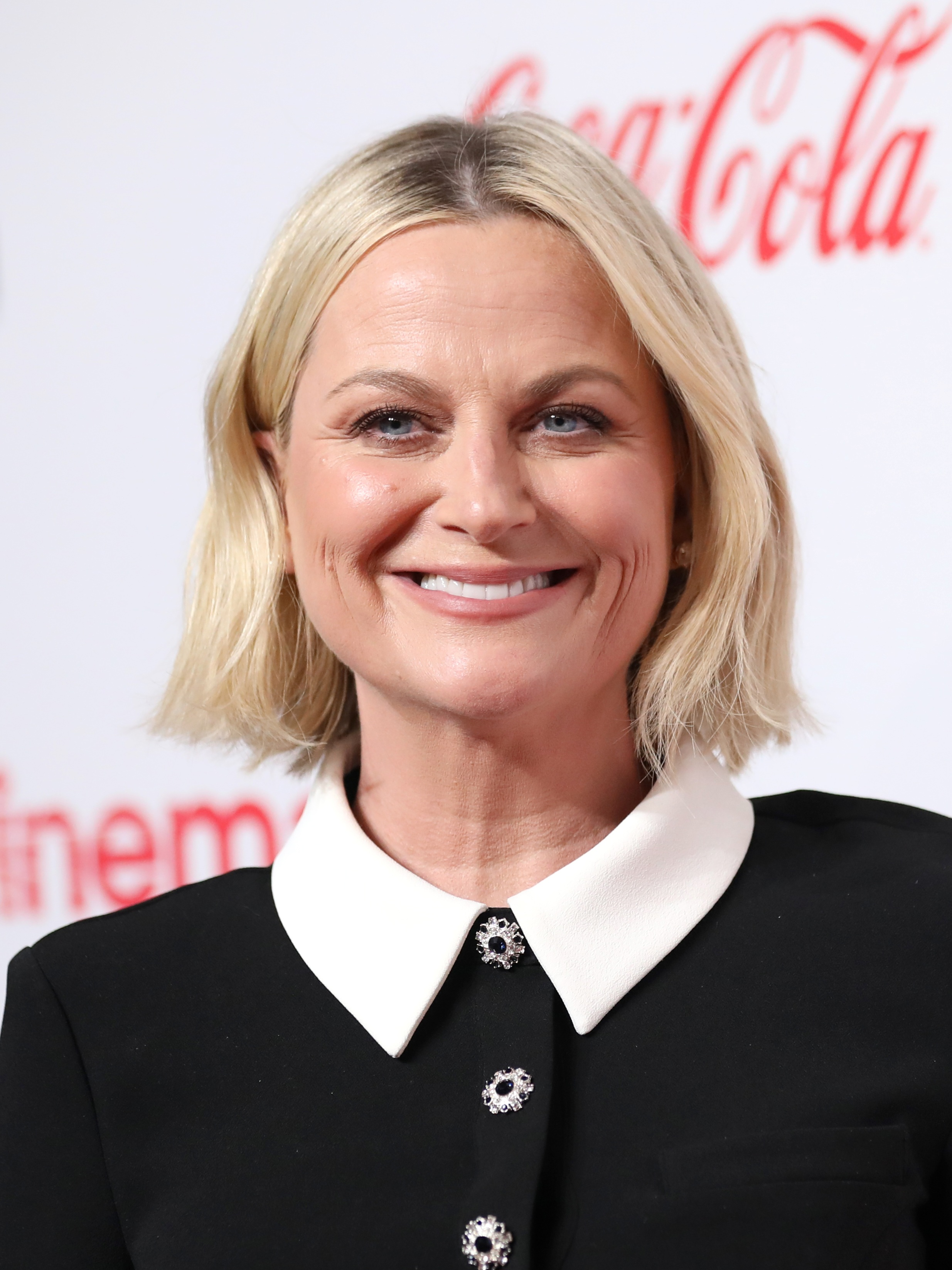
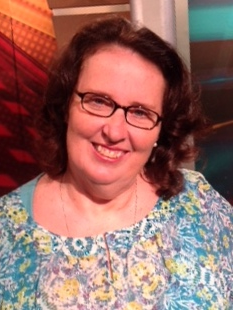
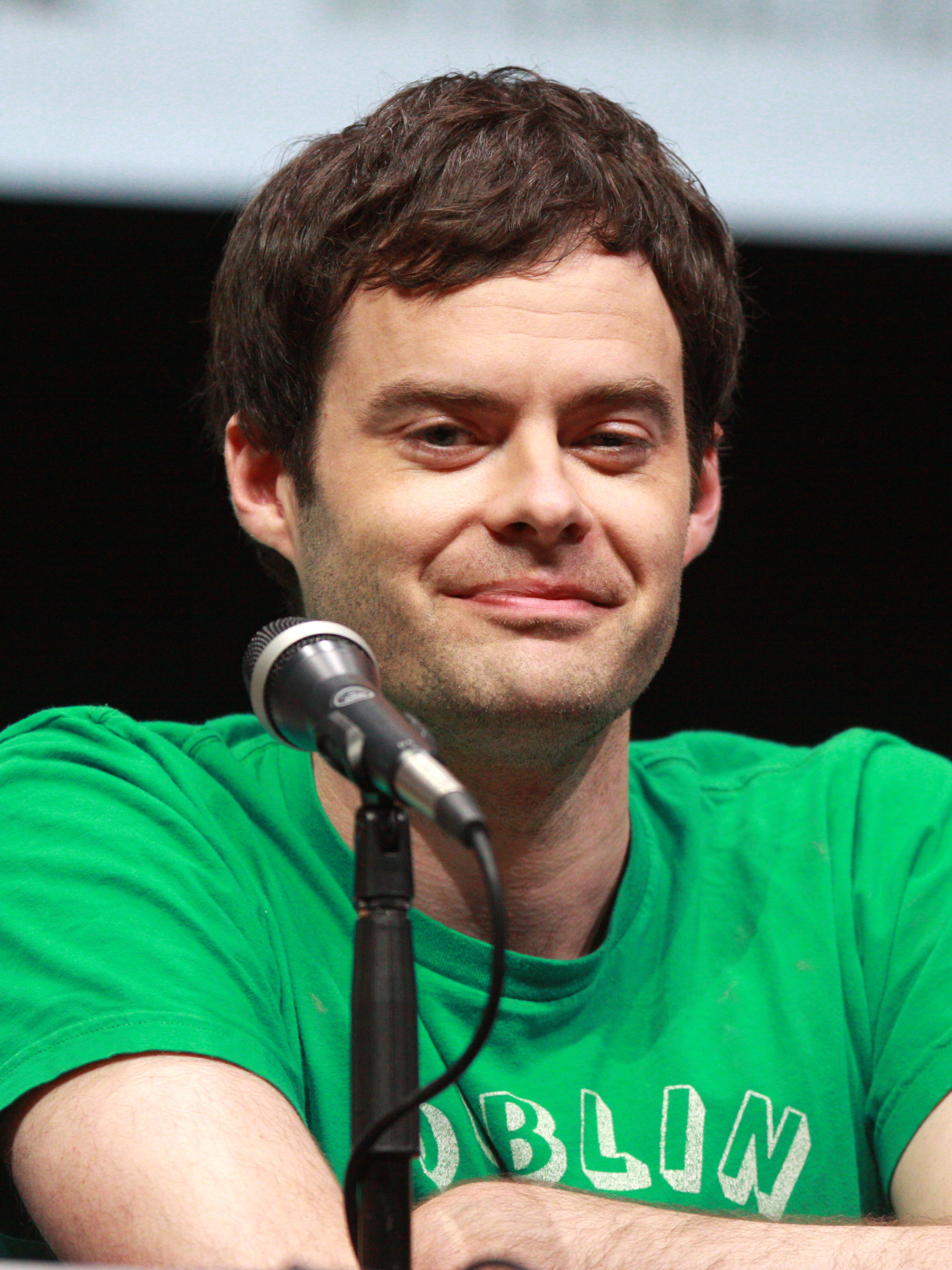
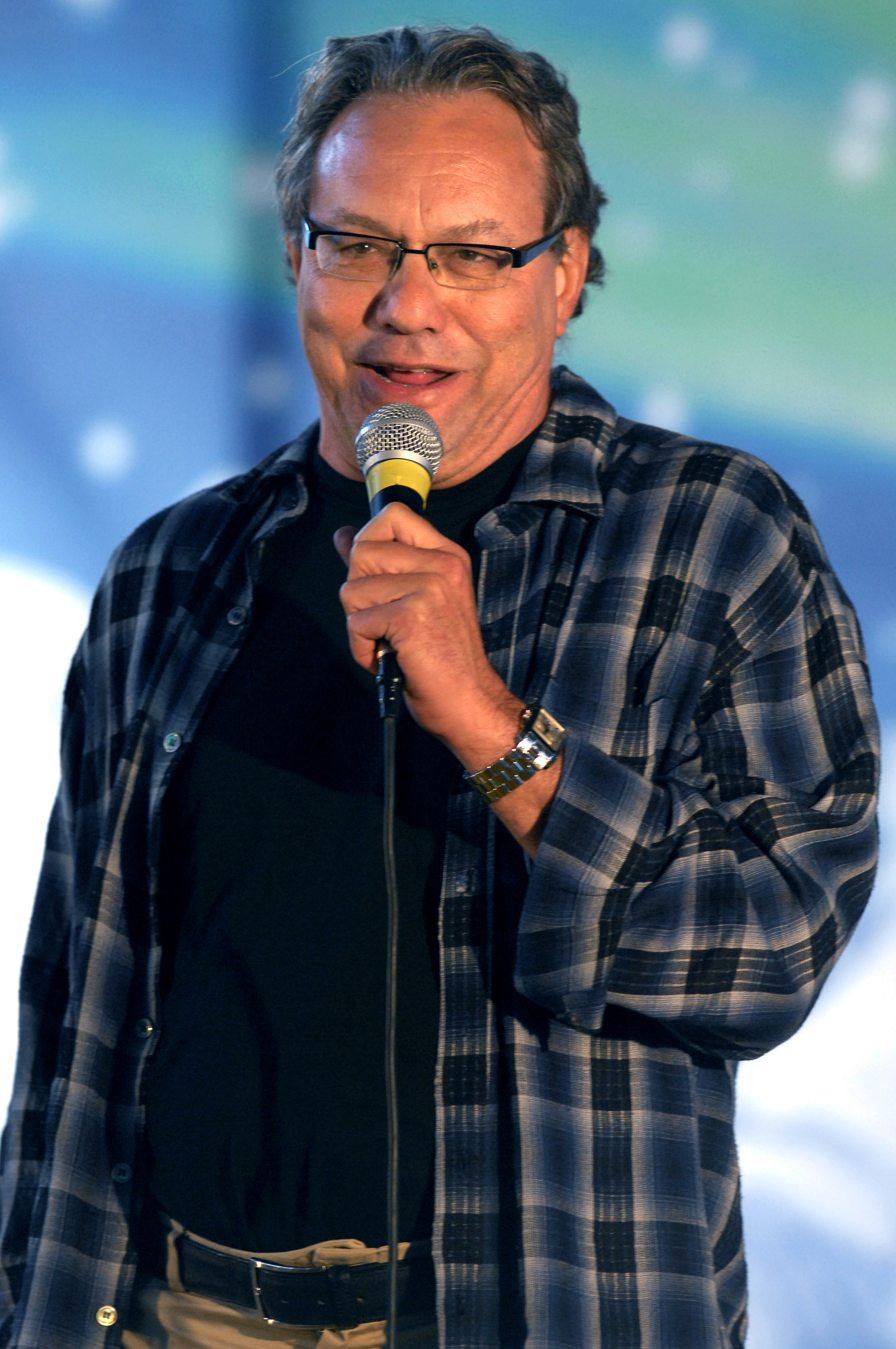
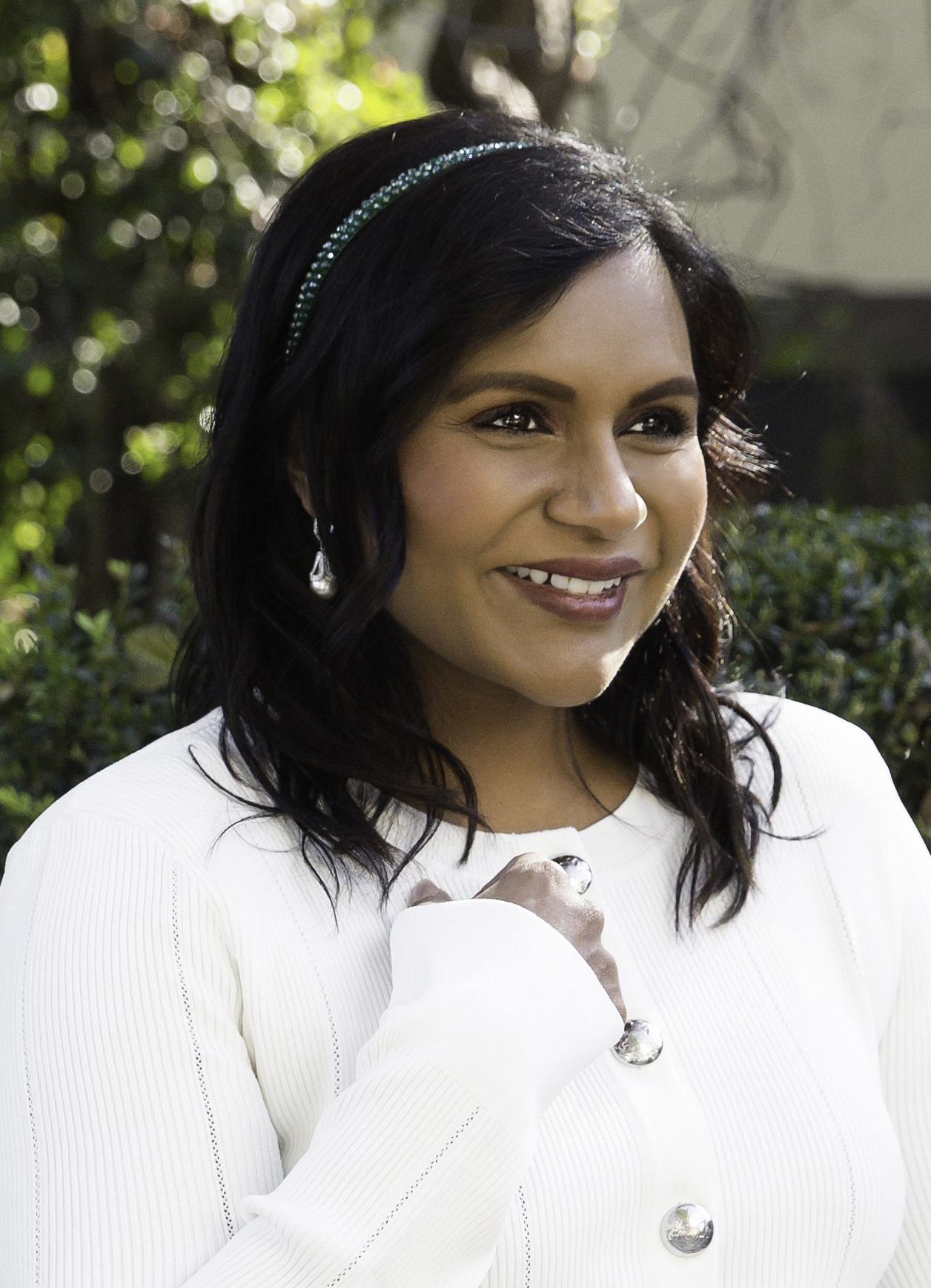
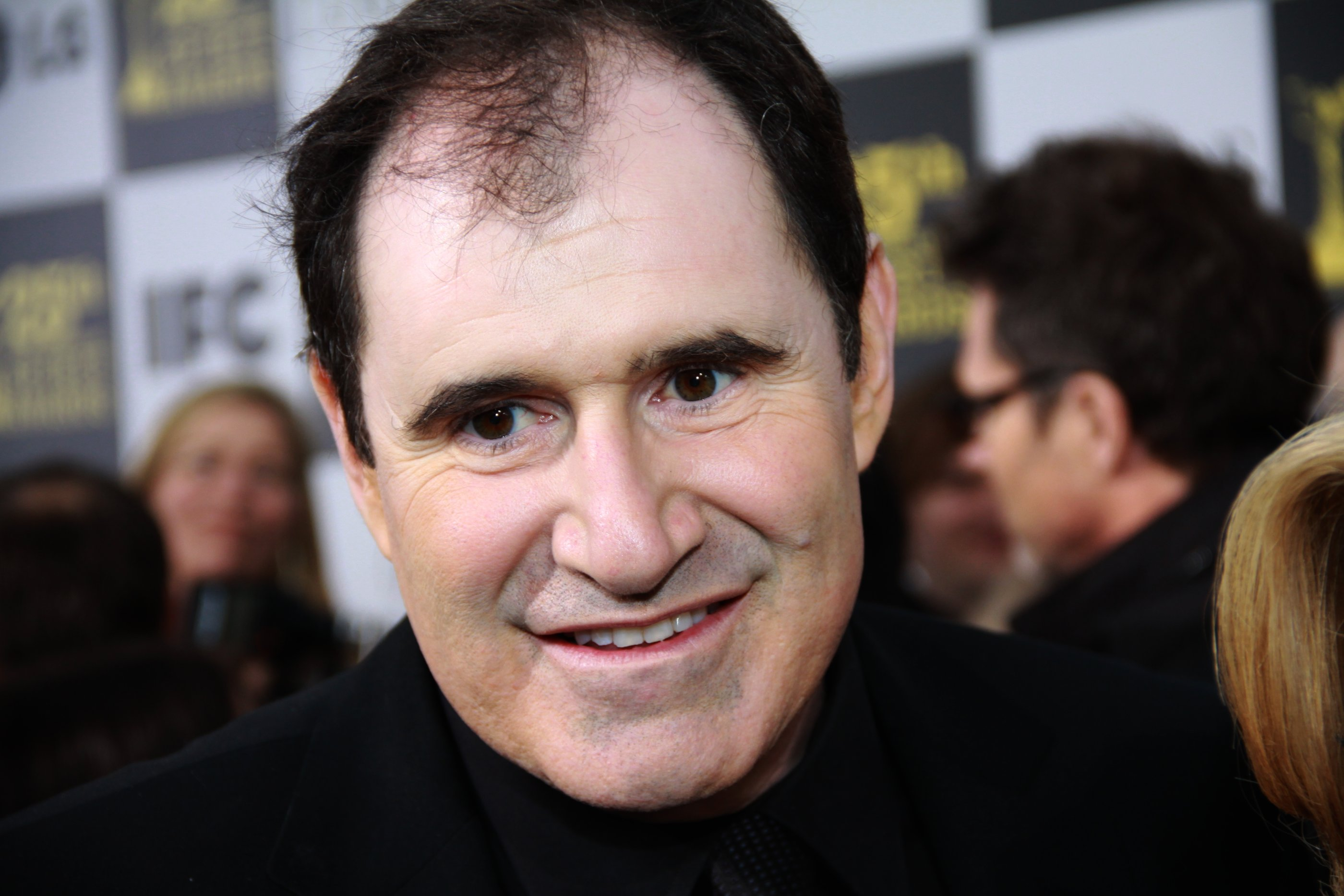
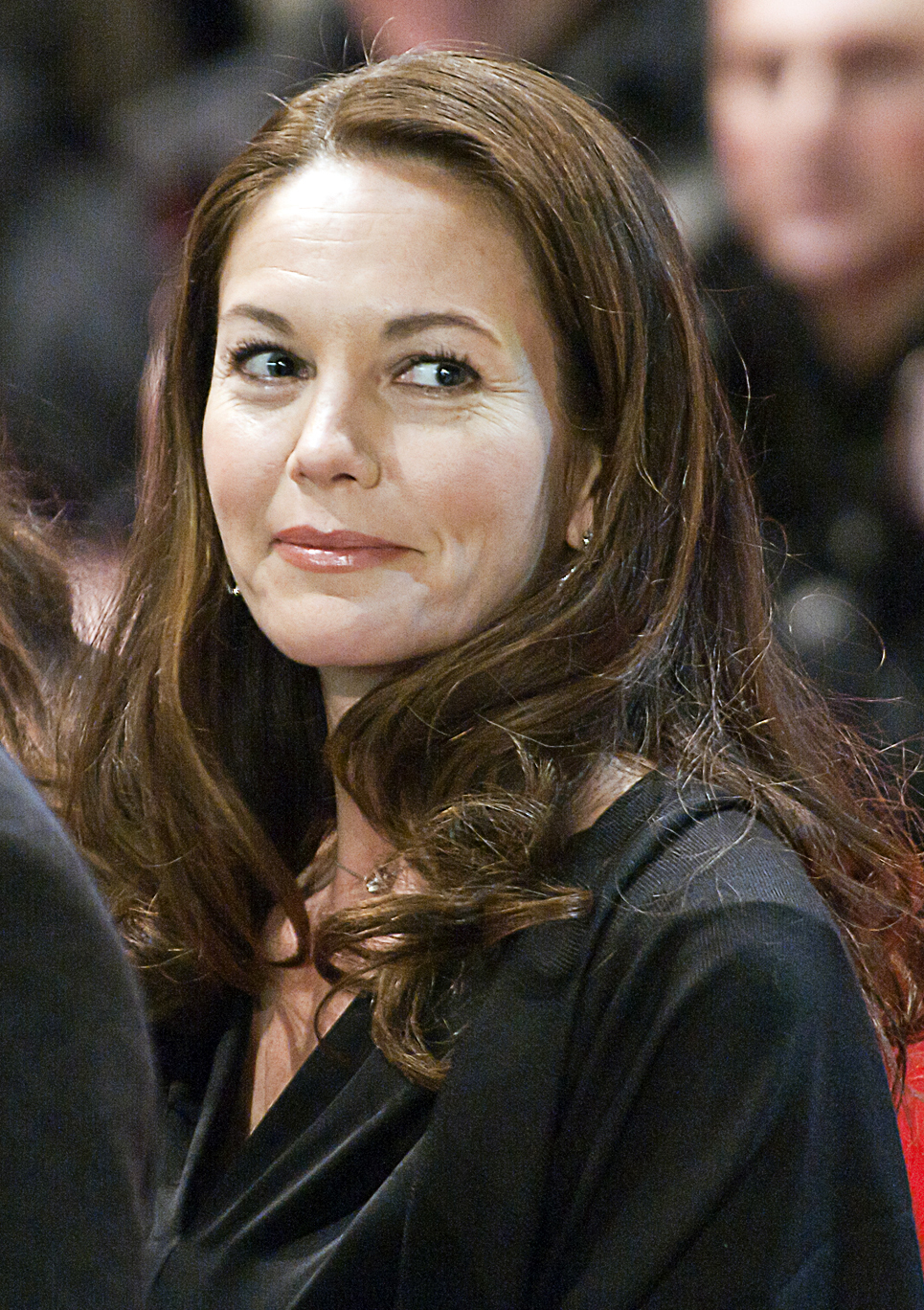
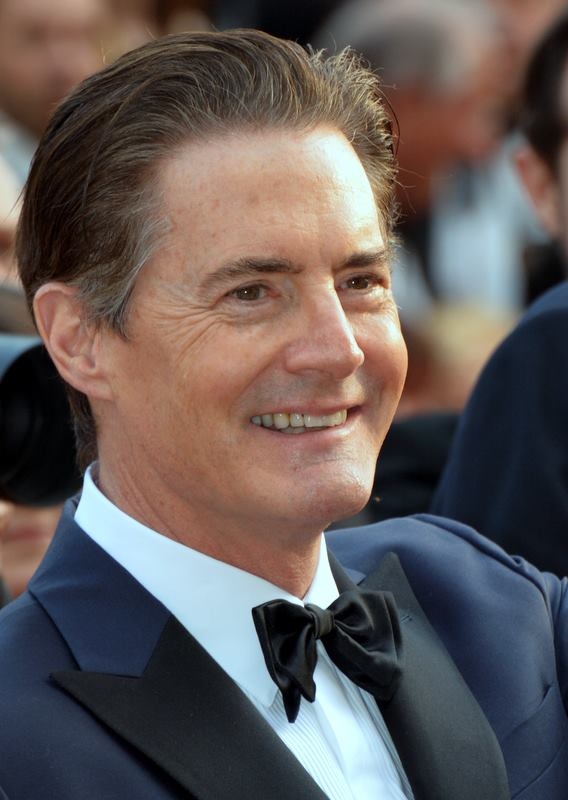
Amy Poehler (left), Phyllis Smith, Bill Hader, Lewis Black, Mindy Kaling, Richard Kind, Diane Lane, and Kyle MacLachlan respectively play as Joy, Sadness, Fear, Anger, Disgust, Bing Bong, and Riley's parents.
- Amy Poehler as Joy, a yellow emotion who often takes the lead in Riley's emotional life and is in charge of giving her assurance in her everyday life and helping her enjoy it to the fullest, while being reluctant to accept any influence that could detract from Riley's happiness
- Phyllis Smith as Sadness, a blue emotion who discovers her purpose is to help process Riley's upsetting experiences and seek help from others when she needs it
- Bill Hader as Fear, a purple emotion responsible for protecting Riley from threats in the physical world
- Mindy Kaling as Disgust, a green emotion who uses visceral aversion and gut reactions to prevent Riley from being physically or socially harmed
- Lewis Black as Anger, a red emotion in charge of fighting to keep things fair for Riley
- Richard Kind as Bing Bong, Riley's lively pink cat/elephant/cotton candy hybrid imaginary friend from early childhood
- Kaitlyn Dias as Riley Andersen, an 11-year-old girl in whose mind the emotions and their supporting staff of Mind Workers live
  - Archival recordings of Mary Gibbs from Monsters, Inc. (2001) are used for baby Riley.
- Diane Lane as Jill Andersen, Riley's mother
- Kyle MacLachlan as Bill Andersen, Riley's father
- Dawnn Lewis as Riley's teacher at her new school
- Paula Poundstone as Forgetter Paula, a Mind Worker who sorts through and disposes of Riley's obsolete long-term memories
- Bobby Moynihan as Forgetter Bobby, Paula's colleague
- Paula Pell as Dream Director, a Mind Worker filmmaker at Dream Productions, which produces Riley's dreams; and Jill's Anger
- Sherry Lynn as Jill's Joy
- Mona Marshall as Jill's Disgust and a Mind Worker
- Lori Alan as Jill's Sadness
- Dave Goelz as Subconscious Guard Frank
- Frank Oz as Subconscious Guard Dave
- Josh Cooley as Jangles the Clown, a children's birthday party clown who secretly despises his job. An exaggerated version of Jangles appears in Riley's mind as a result of his traumatizing her during an early birthday.
- Flea as Mind Worker Cop Jake, a police officer in the Imagination Land theme park representing Riley's imagination
- John Ratzenberger as Fritz, a Mind Worker mechanic who upgrades and maintains the console in Headquarters
- Carlos Alazraqui as a Brazilian helicopter pilot in Jill's memories; and Bill's Fear
- Pete Docter as Bill's Anger
- Nick Pitera as a TripleDent Gum commercial singer; and one of Riley's imaginary boyfriends
- Peter Sagal as Jangles' Joy
- Rashida Jones as Cool Girl's emotions

== Production ==
=== Development ===
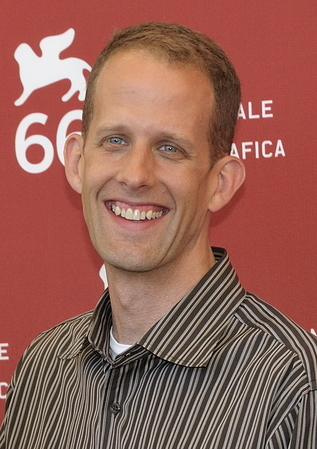
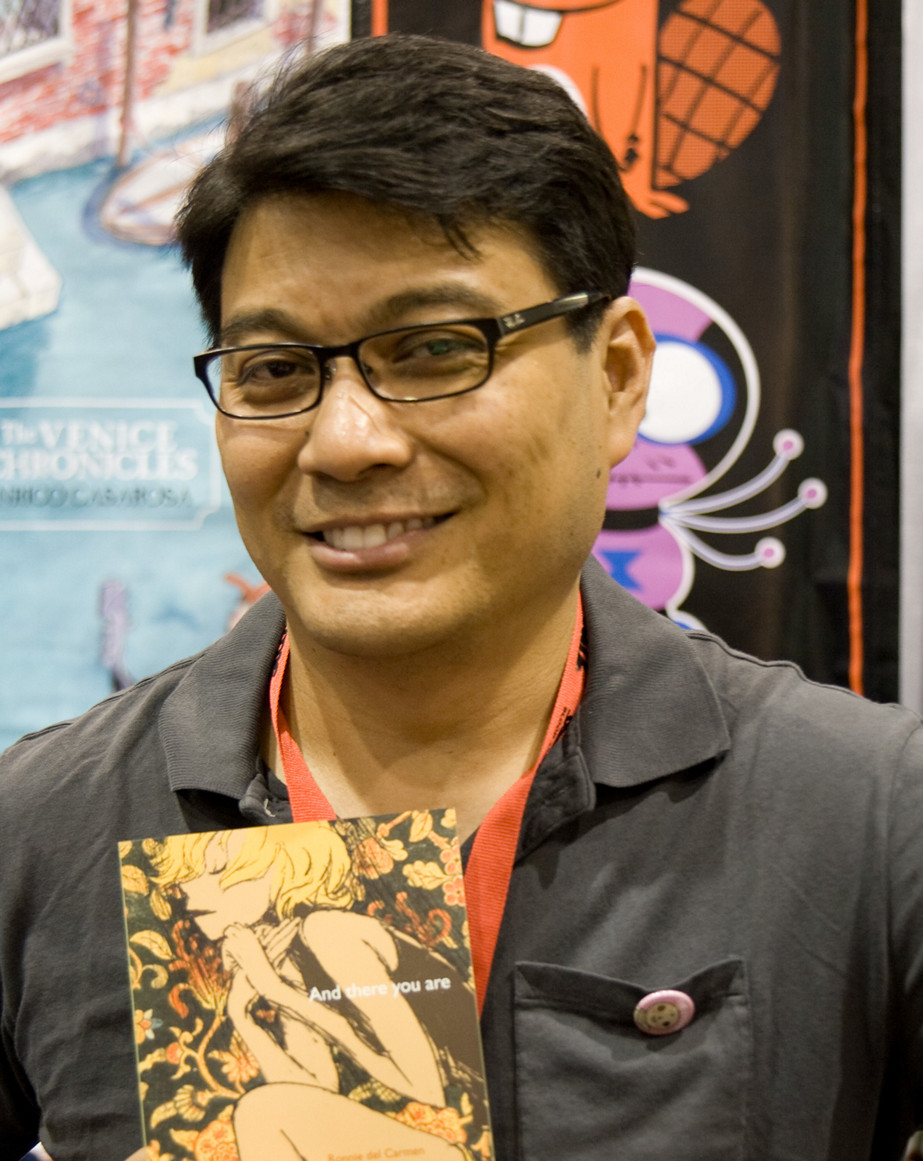
Pete Docter (left) and Ronnie del Carmen in 2009

Development on Inside Out was green-lit in October 2009, after director Pete Docter noticed his daughter Elie becoming "more quiet and reserved", and began to wonder what was happening internally. Docter invited Ronnie del Carmen, who had worked as story supervisor on Finding Nemo (2003) and Up (2009), to join the project as co-director, a role del Carmen accepted. They sought inspiration from their own personal histories and experiences, and conferred with psychologists and specialists such as psychologist Paul Ekman and Dacher Keltner, professor of psychology at the University of California, Berkeley, for accuracy. While designing Riley's mental landscape, they consulted neuroscientists, and took cues from DNA strands and photographs of neuronal flashes. According to Keltner and Ekman, the film emphasizes the ways emotions organize our thoughts and social lives, especially the role of sadness in fostering connections.

About 27 emotions—including irritation, envy, greed, gloom, despair, depression, love, schadenfreude, ennui, shame, embarrassment, and hope—were considered for early versions, but the number was later reduced for the sake of simplicity. (Note: Attributed to multiple references:) Ekman supplied a list of emotions—anger, fear, sadness, disgust, contempt, surprise, and happiness—and Docter decided to remove surprise due to its similarity to fear; he also removed contempt. Happiness was renamed Optimism and later Joy. According to Docter, for some time in the film's development, Chief Creative Officer John Lasseter was less involved on a day-to-day basis on Inside Out and the other Pixar films as he continued to balance running Pixar and Walt Disney Animation Studios. However, when Docter informed Lasseter that the film was not working after more than two years and proposed to swap Fear with Sadness as the emotion who would go on the main journey with Joy, Lasseter agreed. On his involvement with the film's creative team, Lasseter said, "We're always tearing up work and starting over. At Pixar, we trust our process, and we trust each other". It was Pixar's first original film to be produced almost entirely without involvement from the studio's co-founder Steve Jobs, who died in 2011. Development took five-and-a-half years, and the film was produced on a budget of approximately $175 million. Ralph Eggleston, Pixar's production designer, stated it was the hardest and longest film he had ever worked on.

=== Writing ===
In 2010, Docter and the filmmaking team met to discuss aspects of Inside Out, including its setting, rules, and reels. Docter then recruited a small team to develop the narrative and design its characters within 12 months; their main challenge was to handle its multilayered technique. Del Carmen described his upbringing as a significant influence and had the idea of making Riley an avid ice-hockey player due to that sport's popularity in Minnesota. Though the script was deemed ambitious and ingenious, screenwriter Michael Arndt spent a year on it before leaving the project in early 2011; he was attributed with providing additional story material. Along with Docter, Josh Cooley and Meg LeFauve were credited as screenwriters for its rewrites.

To promote diverse input, half of the story team were women at a time when the animation industry largely consisted of men. Although Inside Out's focus is a girl, research found females age 11 to 17 were more attuned to expressions and emotions than younger girls. Docter decided Riley was not a main character but the setting. He considered the lead emotion as female because Riley is a girl. Other emotion characters were assigned male and female. Docter discarded an initial idea about Riley falling into a deep depression. Creation of storyboards took two-to-three years and included seven-to-eight screenings for Pixar's "brains trust", a small group of creative leaders who oversee development of all films. They spent over three years improving the dinnertime scene to avoid it becoming stale with audiences while sustaining the story and humor.

The filmmakers were responsible for expressing the characters' personal traits, talents, and contrasts. Inside Out's design team researched more of Riley's personality's distinct directions after Docter became concerned over Joy's displeasure. Designer Albert Lozano wanted Joy to be tomboyish and mischievous. Amy Poehler helped the team write Joy, illustrating a broad range of happiness after facing difficulties. With LeFauve's help, the team envisioned Joy as a vulnerable, intangible character because she is "unapologetically positive". From the outset, the idea of Joy's potential to excessively manipulate youth, persisted, setting off Riley's "social storms".

In one instance, Riley was to have wanted the lead role as a turkey in a Thanksgiving Day pageant; Docter found that plot idea to be too unfamiliar and sought something to replace it. Several drafts emerged, including the characters cultivating ideas after falling to "Idea Fields"; in another, Bing Bong would recruit a large entourage of exiled characters from Riley's childhood. Richard Kind later defined his character as "the fading of childhood" when Inside Out's development had progressed. In October 2011, Diane Disney Miller persuaded Docter to reduce Inside Out's distractions and reprioritize the story. Docter determined the concept of personality islands could integrate the mind world's geography and story.

In 2012, the film was put into production after several screenings and suggestions, and was evaluated after three months. Editor Kevin Nolting said seven versions were created before the production began. Balancing the tone, for example, viewers' responses to Joy's cheerful nature while feeling negative about the mess Joy manipulates in Riley, was difficult. Producer Jonas Rivera credited Poehler for developing these aspects of Joy's nature. Eggleston recommended setting the film in Riley's mind rather than in her brain, and a few scenes about the brain were dropped.

Pixar filmmakers held an evaluation screening in July 2012. An early version focused on Joy and Fear getting lost together. Docter deemed this problematic and determined the idea about Joy had learned from Fear to develop her characterization, before deciding to integrate emotions and relationships. Instead, Sadness replaced Fear to have a "much juicier" role. Docter's altercation between Joy and Sadness lacked the film's emotional ending. To address the issue, he changed a scene where Riley is separating from her friend in its subsequent portions. Islands of Friendship and Personality became Joy and Sadness's outings to maintain its continuity.

During the storyboarding process, 27 sequences and 178,128 outlines were developed, with 127,781 remaining upon completion. According to Cooley, 10 plot rewrites of Inside Out and 10 unabridged scenes of Riley's mind were made. Initial storyboarding differentiated the importance of Riley's character arc rather than her emotions but Rivera considered the balance was "about 75 percent inside, 25 percent out". In early 2013, the filmmakers made seven-to-eight distinct openings. Inside Out's first completed scenes were test-screened at the Annecy International Animated Film Festival in June 2014. The brain trust eventually locked the picture and its story. Production concluded in May 2015 after three years.

=== Casting ===
Inside Out's principal characters were cast in August 2013. Voice recording began that year and ended in 2014. Casting focused on actors who have personas identical to those of the characters they voiced. Because Inside Out's cast includes several veterans of Saturday Night Live (SNL), the film's production team spent a week at that program researching a live television sequence.

Phyllis Smith was the first of the emotions characters to be cast and Poehler was the last. Smith and Poehler had three voice-recording sessions each. Smith was initially concerned about her attempt to voice a role in an animated film. Once Smith got a call to travel to Pixar's headquarters in Emeryville, California, Rivera cast her after watching a lunch scene in Bad Teacher (2011). He contacted Docter and said, "I think we found our Sadness". Smith saw her natural voice following her first recording session.

Kind was Docter's perfect choice for Bing Bong. Kind attempted to convey the same "sort of innocence" he had conveyed in his previous Pixar roles. Docter described Bing Bong as a contribution of Joy's characterization. Kind modeled Bing Bong's personality and appearance on Oliver Hardy, Jimmy Durante, and John Candy, especially Candy's performance in Planes, Trains, and Automobiles (1987).

Bill Hader and the filmmakers visited the set of SNL in New York City, where his immediate casting as Fear was assumed until his stay ended. Hader contacted Poehler and said his role was secret before reaffirming his involvement in Inside Out. In preparation, Hader practiced "almost every emotion" and his screaming voice in recording sessions. (Note: Attributed to multiple references:) Fear was modeled on both actor Don Knotts and Rowan Atkinson's character Mr. Bean, both of whom have wide eyes. Docter described Fear as "the kind of guy who could bring sophistication and then flip on a dime".

Mindy Kaling attended six recording sessions within four hours to voice Disgust before being cast in the role. She said the story sounded "really beautiful" when it was pitched to her. Docter said Lewis Black exemplified Anger, and he was cast after the filmmakers kept him in mind, having heard Black's voice. The filmmakers cast Kaitlyn Dias as Riley, having described her performance as "touching" and adapted its "heartbreaking honesty". According to Rivera, Dias's casting was "perfect".

=== Design ===
Eggleston was tasked with outlining the mind and real worlds through design briefs. The mind world incorporates soft surfaces, increased use of saturated colors and contrasty light, and translucency whereas the real world uses opposite attributes. The worlds' design resembles those of Pixar films Up and Toy Story 3 (2010), the romantic drama One from the Heart (1982), David Hockney's theatrical productions, and the intended 1950s Broadway musicals. Supervising animator Victor Navone tightened the design's aspects, which were emphasized by freeform surface modeling. Around 300 designs of Headquarters were developed. Decoding how to depict the mind's interior, the filmmakers concentrated on the word "electrochemical" and considered options using electricity.

Character designs underwent several revisions before they were finalized. Simple shapes were initially designed, these included Anger as a brick, Joy as a star, Sadness as a tear, and Fear as a nerve. Sadness's appearance was eventually changed to that of Debbie Downer. Lozano planned to dress Sadness in pajamas to highlight her depression. Disgust's and Anger's approaches were respectively based on April Ludgate and Hades from Hercules (1997). To avoid similarities to Tinker Bell, Joy was given a green dress and her hair color was changed to blue. After Pixar presented potential designs of Riley to the audience, Lozano thought the character looked like Elie.

=== Animation ===
Animation of Inside Out took a year and a half. About 48 animators, including supervisors Shawn Krause and Victor Navone, and director Jamie Roe and 350 artists—35 of them lighting–led by cinematographer Kim White–and 10 layout—and technicians were involved in the production. Two animation teams were assembled: one for the abstract sequence and another involving crowd simulation for the character groupings. They used novel technology to locate every part of the human body.

Docter imagined with emotions for characters, they could "push the level of caricature" to both design and style of movement. To this end, they emulated the animation styles of Tex Avery and Chuck Jones. Docter informed Krause and Navone to push the graphic caricature of each character rather than sticking to the rigid behavior of each RenderMan model. This required an artist to draw over the characters using a Wacom Cintiq during dailies. After their forms were finalized, the characters were proposed for 3D models using desktop computers. The filmmakers studied dailies until Docter gave Inside Out's finalized shots approval on lighting and rendering.

Inside Out made increased use of an advanced sketching tool with which animators performed rapid sculpting on silhouettes, altering the characters' appearances and evaluating a "fine-tuning" cloth stimulation. Through the simulation department, the motion of the characters' hair and garments was added. Pixar co-founder Edwin Catmull felt the characters' attributes have to a lesser extent humanoid forms, bright colors, and strange shapes due to their possession of force fields. All aspects of Inside Out were eventually merged into a single image, becoming an animation spread across 1,600 shots. Each three seconds of footage took three weeks to create and 33 hours to render.

Both animation teams handled the transition of Joy from a "complete abstract" to an "animatable character". Lighting Joy was Eggleston's early inspiration through his production design. Eggleston's pastel diagram shaped Joy, increasing her illumination and making her Pixar's crucial character. Instead of being solid, Joy's effervescence was derived from pinwheels, Champagne, and sparklers. Lozano thought Joy looked like Audrey Hepburn. For Joy to become brightened, the RenderMan team developed geometrical optics, and Docter suggested designing her with "sprite-like and golden" modifications. These effects function dependably due to Joy's typical type. Over 750 shots were made using artistic performance and lighting cinematography. The filmmakers worked on Joy's aura for eight months but encountered difficulties with time and budget. Lasseter requested that it be applied for each emotion instead. Eggleston described this technique, saying "You could hear the core technical staff just hitting the ground, the budget falling through the roof". Docter and his six-designer team spent approximately 18 months finalizing Joy's look. The process of making Joy took three years.

=== Cinematography ===
Director of photography Patrick Lin focused on emphasizing Inside Out's cinematography. It created a visual language with unique camera styles to depict the mind world and the real world, allowing a connection between the story and Riley's character. Lin said these worlds can polarize themselves. The mind world's layout and cinematography were influenced by Casablanca (1942). Pixar researched films from Hollywood's golden age for set constructions. They performed master moving shots, combining them into a single scene, the longest of which were 48 seconds and consisted of 1,200 frames.

Filming the real world encountered problems with lens distortion and out-of-focus shots but directorial changes countered the camera-work's complexity. The camera operators used Arri Ultra Prime and Zeiss Cooke S4 lenses with distinct camera movements and predetermined paths for both worlds. A dolly, track, crane, and boom were used for the mind world and hand-held cameras with zoom lenses and Steadicam mounts were used for the real one. Lin's crew supervised Riley's arc as these cameras were used across three acts; the first was mounted on a Steadicam and the second was hand-held.

Inside Out's certain aspects were supported by "scale progressions" (the worldbuilding size based on the main characters' perspective) for characterizations, as well as Riley and Joy's arcs, staging for the story, and framing for the theme. The cameras were created by the crew have attached sensors; these cameras were "rough" and "physical" but were improved in Inside Out after being used in Pixar's short film The Blue Umbrella (2013). Human–machine system was made to roam each person within Inside Out's environment, assigning each of their performances to interact the scenes. Virtual ones were blocked using Layout before being animated.

=== Music and sound design ===
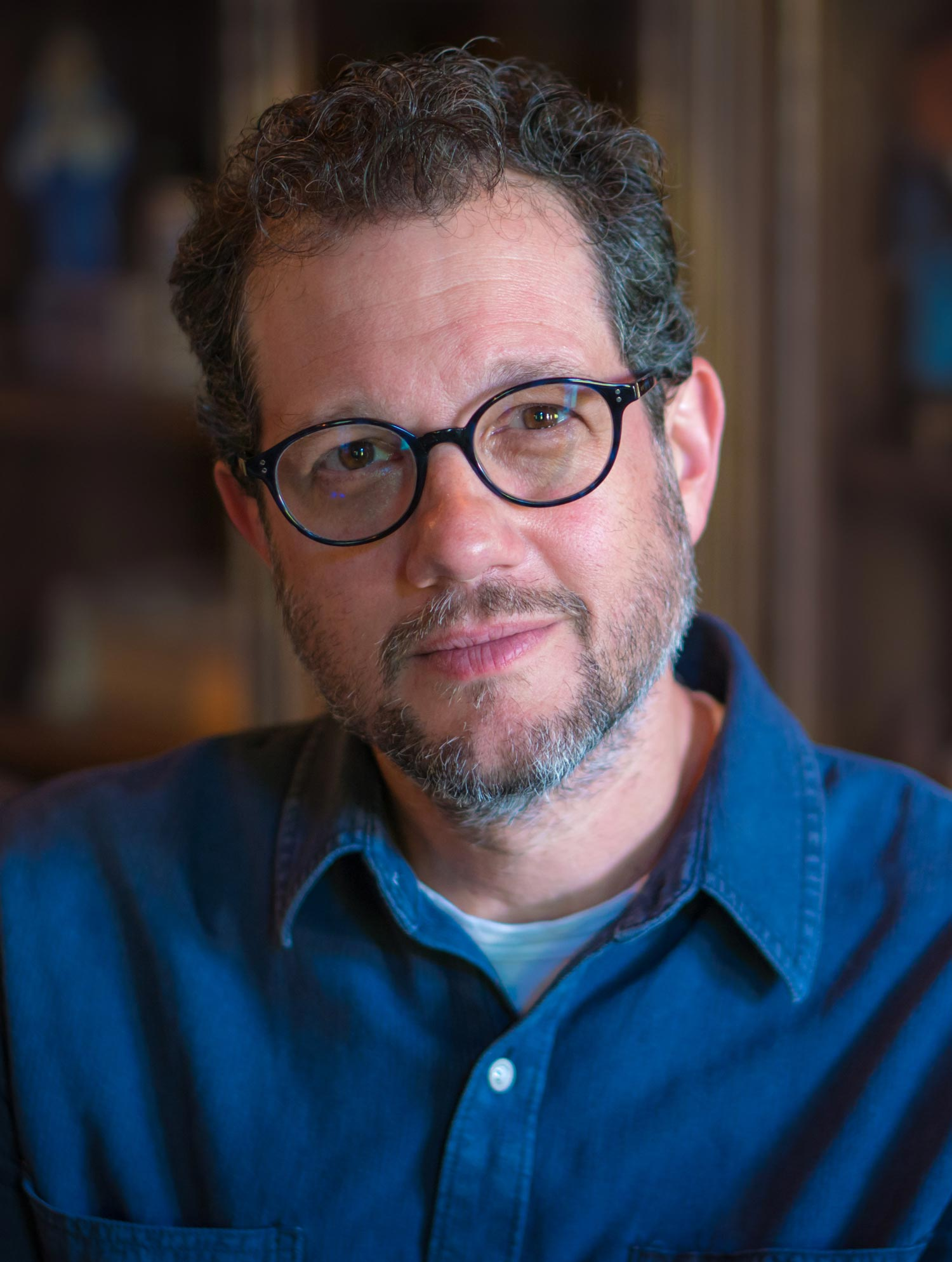
Giacchino in September 2017

Michael Giacchino composed the music for Inside Out. He began planning in January 2015 and concluded in May 2015. While in the music session, Docter felt its score was "bittersweet" and "nostalgic". Giacchino wanted to create something more emotionally monumental for Inside Out than his score from Up. The producers first met with Giacchino to discuss the concept and screen it for him. In response, Giacchino composed an eight-minute suite of music, unconnected to the film, based on his emotions viewing it. Rivera said because both Giacchino and Docter were musicians, they discussed the film in terms of story and character. In accordance with his creative preference, sound designer Ren Klyce created a progressive soundscape. Audio mixing was done to harmonize "dense" sounds for the beginning scene. The introduction of Joy uses a single sound.

== Release ==
=== Marketing ===
Marketing Inside Out was considered difficult despite the enthusiasm of executives at Disney and Pixar. Writing for The Washington Post, Kristen Page-Kirby described this as "absolutely screwed". Disney's marketing strategy included an active social media campaign, a worldwide publicity tour, and the creation of five colorful character posters. Kind did not take part in Inside Out's marketing because the producers decided to keep Bing Bong a secret. As a result, the character was excluded from the film's promotion to focus on the emotion characters. Docter considered Kind's decision "smart", recognizing Bing Bong was a "surprise to the audience". In the run-up to its release, the film was test-screened for children because executives were worried about its appeal to young viewers. Disney Infinity 3.0 added a platformer-type Inside Out playset featuring all five emotion characters as playable characters. A mobile Puzzle Bobble-style game titled Inside Out: Thought Bubbles was released.

=== Home media ===
Walt Disney Studios Home Entertainment released Inside Out for digital download on October 13, 2015, and on Blu-ray and DVD on November 3. Physical copies contain an audio commentary, behind-the-scenes featurettes, deleted scenes, and the short films Riley's First Date? and Lava. Inside Out was the best-selling home-video release of November 2015 and the number-five rental during its release week. Blu-ray accounted for 57 percent of its sales. By the end of 2015, the physical release had grossed about $97.8 million. A 4K Ultra HD Blu-ray version was released in 2019.

== Reception ==
=== Box office ===
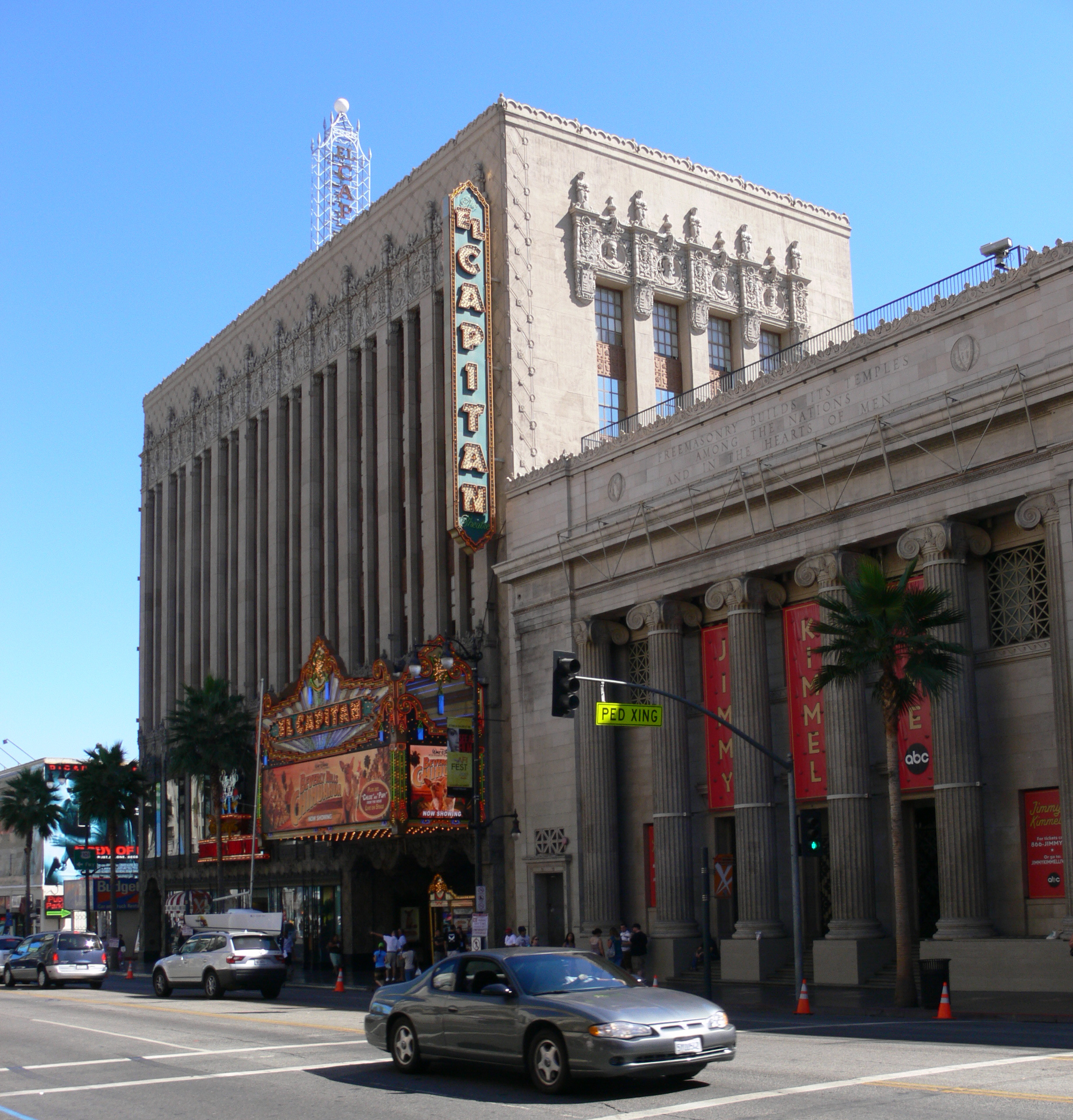
The North American premiere of Inside Out took place at the El Capitan Theatre (pictured in 2008).

Inside Out premiered out of competition at the 68th Cannes Film Festival on May 18, 2015, followed by a premiere on June 8 at the El Capitan Theatre in Hollywood, Los Angeles. In the event at Cannes, the film received an eight-minute standing ovation. Inside Out was also released in Dolby Vision, making it one of the earliest films to adopt the format. In theaters, it was accompanied by a short film called Lava (2014).

Inside Out was initially scheduled for release on May 30, 2014, but was postponed to June 19, 2015. During its opening weekend in the United States and Canada, Inside Out grossed $90.4 million across 3,946 theaters, 3,100 of which were in 3D, debuting at number two behind Jurassic World ($106.6 million). This revenue included $3.7 million from Thursday night previews. The weekend-total figure made Inside Out the first Pixar film not to debut at number one, the biggest number-two debut of all time (surpassing The Day After Tomorrow), and the largest opening weekend for any original film (surpassing Avatar), and was Pixar's second-biggest opening after Toy Story 3. Multiple factors were attributed to Inside Out's successful opening such as its Cannes premiere, CinemaCon, and Fathom Events screenings, favorable word-of-mouth, favorable critical reception, and its release over the Father's Day weekend. It primarily drew a mostly female audience and approximately 71 percent of the viewers were families. The film grossed $52.1 million in its second weekend—a reduction of 42 percent—and $29.3 million in its third. After finishing its theatrical run on December 10, 2015, Inside Out had grossed $356.9 million in the U.S. and Canada as the fourth-highest-grossing film of the year. In July 2020, due to the worldwide closure of cinemas during the COVID-19 pandemic and limits on which films played, Inside Out returned to 442 theaters—mostly drive-ins—and grossed $340,000.

Outside the U.S. and Canada, Inside Out grossed $40.3 million during its opening weekend in 37 markets. Its top-grossing markets were China at $11.7 million, the United Kingdom at $11.5 million, Mexico at $8.6 million, Russia at $7.6 million, Italy at $7.4 million, Germany at $7.1 million, and South Korea at $5.2 million. Inside Out was the first Pixar film to gross over one billion rubles in Russia. The film grossed a further $501.9 million, its highest grosses coming from the United Kingdom ($59.4 million), Japan ($33 million), Germany ($31.6 million), Mexico ($31.1 million), South Korea ($30.9 million), France ($30.1 million), Italy ($27.1 million), Venezuela ($25.4 million), and Australia ($24.2 million). This made it the seventh-highest-grossing film outside the U.S. and Canada, and the seventh-highest-grossing film of 2015 with a total gross of $859.1 million. Deadline Hollywood calculated the film's net profit as $279.51 million, accounting for production budgets, marketing, talent participation, and other costs; box-office grosses and home-media revenues placed it sixth on their list of 2015's "Most Valuable Blockbusters".

=== Critical response ===
Inside Out received critical acclaim, (Note: Attributed to multiple references:) and was listed on many critics' top-10 lists in 2015. It has an approval rating of 98% based on 385 professional reviews on the review aggregator website Rotten Tomatoes, with an average rating of 8.9/10. The consensus reads, "Inventive, gorgeously animated, and powerfully moving, Inside Out is another outstanding addition to the Pixar library of modern animated classics". Metacritic (which uses a weighted average) assigned Inside Out a score of 94 out of 100 based on 55 critics, indicating "universal acclaim". Audiences polled by CinemaScore gave the film an average grade of "A" on an A+ to F scale.

Inside Out was praised by critics for its craftsmanship and Docter's direction, (Note: Attributed to multiple references:) with some describing it as a return to form for Pixar. (Note: Attributed to multiple references:) Peter Debruge (Variety), Kenneth Turan (Los Angeles Times), and Todd McCarthy (The Hollywood Reporter) praised the film. Debruge and Turan described it as Pixar's best, calling it "sophisticated" and "audacious". Turan and Richard Brody (The New Yorker) cited the engaging visuals, its message about the value of emotions, and the depiction of Riley's imagination, and Debruge and Anthony Lane (The New Yorker) praised its originality. (Note: Attributed to multiple references:) Vulture's David Edelstein said the film is a "new pop-culture touchstone". The Guardian critic Peter Bradshaw and Slant Magazine writer Christopher Gray assessed it as slightly inferior to Pixar's best works. Jackson Murphy gave the film a positive review and a "B" grade, describing the film as "good, but far from Pixar's best effort", adding it was "emotionally manipulative" at times and the core messages were "underwhelming and off-balance".

The scriptwriting, plot, and subject matter were praised. (Note: Attributed to multiple references:) Forbes's Scott Mendelson said the script supports its themes whereas Leigh Singer of IGN noted the tropes include child devotion, teamwork, and confused chases. Singer said the "tried-and-tested" journey had an unprecedented "licence to go". Rene Rodriguez, writing for the Miami Herald, said the story skips from the beginning to the end and characters inside Riley's head have thin goals. Ann Hornaday (The Washington Post) and A. O. Scott (The New York Times) appreciated its entertaining subject matter. The Hindu's Udhav Naig saw the film as promoting mental health but panned its misinterpretation of brain functions.

Media reviews for the actors' performances were very positive; (Note: Attributed to multiple references:) their work was described as "wonderful" and "excellent". Edelstein commended Poehler's acting, saying she has "supernatural exuberance but the semi-tonal quavers of doubt that keep that ... from being cloying or cartoonish". Magnett called Anger the "most perfect" character with a "sense of humor and genuine care".

=== Accolades ===
At the 88th Academy Awards, Inside Out received a nomination for Best Original Screenplay and won Best Animated Feature. Its other nominations include 14 Annie Awards (winning 10), two British Academy Film Awards (winning one), three Critics' Choice Movie Awards (winning one), and a Golden Globe Award (which it won). The National Board of Review and the American Film Institute named Inside Out one of the 10-best films of 2015; it also won the National Board of Review's Best Animated Film award.

== Post-release ==
=== Thematic analysis ===
A central theme of Inside Out is the consequences and portrayal of emotions and memories. Those depicted in the film are "honest" and "generous"; their goal is maintaining Riley's life. Natasha Moore of the Australian ABC News said of the film's theme: "[If] Riley's carefree life gets more complicated, ... Joy's attempts to deliver uninterrupted happiness become increasingly neurotic". Nicole Markotic said the film explores the relationship between "the many and the one", demonstrating people have "composite" personalities. The different components of one person's personality are vital for that person's "emotional and psychological balance". Depression and sadness are distinct in the film; this distinction is meant to "[offer] individuals strategies to avoid suppressing crucial feelings". Writing in the British Journal of Psychiatry, Hannah Marcarian and Paul O. Wilkinson said this validation of different emotions helps people express themselves.

Ruth Bettelheim of USA Today wrote human responses to physical and social environments evolved over millions of years and are not yet fully understood, as shown by the film's omission of Riley's bodily sensations and their possible effect on mental states. Primatologist Louise Barrett said the film shows disconnection between characters who are not relating to each other or to their own emotions but moments of personal harmony lead to positive interpersonal connections. According to USA Today's Jamie Altman, Inside Out shows major environmental changes can be "difficult, but not impossible, to overcome", recommending it to college students experiencing homesickness or sadness.

=== Lawsuits ===
Three lawsuits followed Inside Out's release. Pediatrician Denise Daniels sued Disney and Pixar in 2017, claiming the film's personified emotions infringed on her pitch for a television series called The Moodsters. Two similar suits followed in 2018; author Carla J. Masterson sued Disney for infringing her books What's on the Other Side of the Rainbow? and The Secret of the Golden Mirror, and another was brought in the United States District Court for the Northern District of California by a Canadian student Damon Pourshian, who had made a film titled Inside Out. Approved by an Ontario court in 2021, his suit's outcome is unknown, and Daniels's and Masterson's were rejected.

== Legacy ==
=== Retrospective assessments ===
According to Film and Philosophy, a philosophical journal, Inside Out is one of the best animated films ever made. Various publications, such as IndieWire and The A.V. Club, have referred to Inside Out as a standout entry in the 2010s. (Note: Attributed to multiple references:) A 2016 BBC poll of 177 film critics listed Inside Out as the 41st-best film of the 21st century, and The New York Times placed it seventh on its own list. Empire and The Independent respectively named it 18th- and 41st-best in 2020. The film's screenplay was listed number twenty-nine on the Writers Guild of America's "101 Greatest Screenplays of the 21st Century (So Far)" in 2021. In 2025, it was one of the films voted for the "Readers' Choice" edition of The New York Times' list of "The 100 Best Movies of the 21st Century," finishing at number 110.

=== Cultural impact ===
In 2015, Google started a Made with Code event for Inside Out named "Inside HQ" to encourage children, especially girls, to study programming. Worldwide, it was among the top entertainment Google searches of 2015. The film is referenced in the television series The Simpsons. During the COVID-19 pandemic, Inside Out was one of the 35 films recommended by The Independent.

Inside Out inspired several Internet memes. A meme implying a similarity between Joy and Disgust and the Philippine supercouple nicknamed AlDub was posted on social media in 2015. Riley's mother and maternal characters from other Pixar films were shown in a buttocks-themed "Dump-Truck" meme.

The concept of "core memories" became an expression used among Gen Z and later a trend on video-sharing service TikTok in mid-2022. Some parents have reportedly attempted to "engineer" core memories for their children, despite the concept having been created for the film and having limited scientific basis.

== Expanded franchise ==
Inside Out was followed by a short film titled Riley's First Date? (2015) that takes place briefly after the events of the film and was included on the film's Blu-ray release, and later a feature-length sequel, Inside Out 2 (2024). It featured Docter's "five to 27 emotions" idea, incorporating Anxiety (Maya Hawke), Envy (Ayo Edebiri), Embarrassment (Paul Walter Hauser), Ennui (Adèle Exarchopoulos), and Nostalgia (June Squibb) into the sequel, and outgrossed the original film at the box office. A four-episode limited series titled Dream Productions that takes place between the events of Inside Out and Inside Out 2 was released on Disney+ on December 11, 2024. Another sequel, Inside Out 3, is in development as of 2025.

== See also ==
- Cartesian theater
- Robert Plutchik
- Intrapersonal communication
- Inner Team
- The Numskulls, similar characters from the Beano
