= Ronnie del Carmen =

Filipino-American storyboard artist

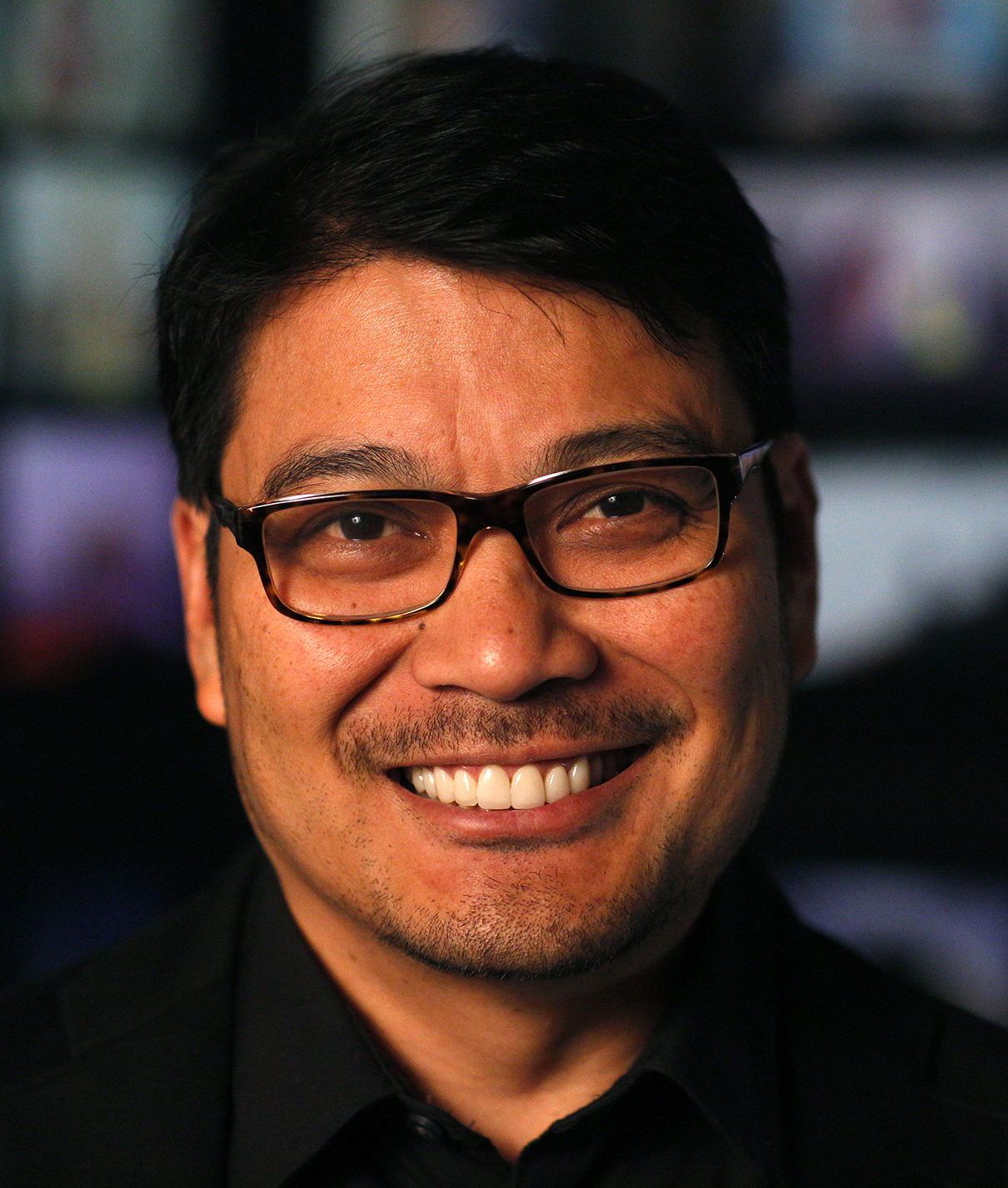
- Del Carmen in 2014
- Born: Ronaldo del Carmen; December 31, 1959 (age 66); Cavite City, Philippines
- Education: University of Santo Tomas
- Occupations: Writer; director; storyboard artist; illustrator; voice actor
- Years active: 1990–present
- Employers: DreamWorks Animation (1997–2003); Pixar Animation Studios (2000–2021); Netflix (2020–present)
- Children: 2
- Relatives: Louie del Carmen (brother)

Ronaldo del Carmen is a Filipino writer, director, storyboard artist, illustrator, and voice actor. He co-directed and co-wrote the story for the Pixar film Inside Out (2015), for which he was nominated for an Academy Award for Best Original Screenplay, the first Filipino to do so.

== Early life and education ==
Del Carmen was born in the city of Cavite in the Philippines. After high school, he worked as a painter on the set of Francis Ford Coppola's 1979 film Apocalypse Now, which was filming in the Philippines. He graduated from the University of Santo Tomas with a Bachelor of Fine Arts in Advertising.

== Career ==
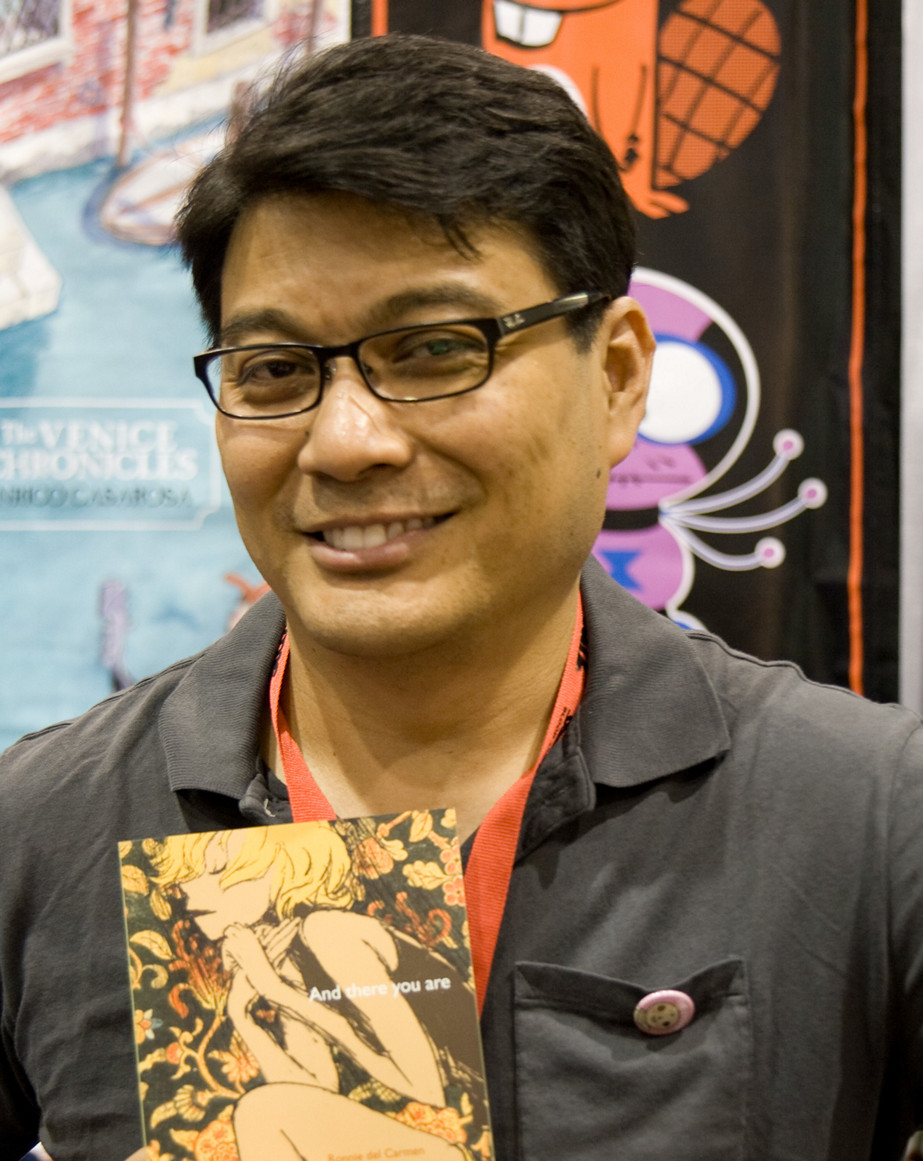
Del Carmen at San Diego Comic-Con in 2009

=== Film ===
After college, Del Carmen worked as an art director for print and television advertising campaigns before moving to the United States in 1989 to pursue a career in film. He worked for Warner Bros as a storyboard artist on Batman: The Animated Series, and as a story supervisor for DreamWorks on The Prince of Egypt (1998), The Road to El Dorado (2000), Spirit: Stallion of the Cimarron (2002) and Sinbad: Legend of the Seven Seas (2003). He joined Pixar Animation Studios in 2000, working as story supervisor on Finding Nemo (2003), production designer on the Academy Award-nominated short film One Man Band (2005), storyboard artist on Ratatouille (2007) and WALL-E (2008), and story supervisor on Up (2009). He made his directorial debut with the animated short film Dug's Special Mission (2009), which accompanied Up on its DVD and Blu-ray release. He co-directed the animated film Inside Out with Pete Docter. The film premiered at the 68th Cannes Film Festival on May 18, 2015.

In April 2021, it was revealed that Del Carmen had left Pixar and was set to write and direct an animated feature film based on Philippine folklore at Netflix.

=== Comic books ===
Del Carmen has illustrated several comic books, including Batman Adventures: Holiday Special, which won an Eisner Award for Best Single Issue in 1995, and the children's book My Name Is Dug, written by Kiki Thorpe. He has also written several comic books, including the Paper Biscuit series and And There You Are.

== Personal life ==
Del Carmen is married and has two children. His brothers, Louie and Rick, also work in animation. After moving in the United States, he partially became a U.S. citizen in prior of working with animation studios for over two decades.

== Filmography ==
=== Films ===
Year	Title	Director	(Original) Story by	Story Supervisor	Story Artist	Other	Voice Role	Notes
1993	Batman: Mask of the Phantasm	No	No	No	Yes	Yes		Storyboard Designer
1998	The Prince of Egypt	No	No	No	Yes	No		
2000	The Road to El Dorado	No	No	Yes	No	No		Artistic Supervisor - Story
2000	Batman Beyond: Return of the Joker	No	No	No	Yes	No		Direct-to-video
2002	Spirit: Stallion of the Cimarron	No	No	Yes	No	No		Artistic Supervisor - Story
2003	Finding Nemo	No	No	Yes	No	No		
2003	Sinbad: Legend of the Seven Seas	No	No	No	Additional	No		
2007	Ratatouille	No	No	No	Yes	No		
2008	WALL-E	No	No	No	Yes	No		
2009	Up	No	No	Yes	No	Yes		Additional Screenplay Material
2012	Brave	No	No	No	Additional	No		
2013	Monsters University	No	No	No	Additional	No		
2015	Inside Out	Co-Director	Yes	No	No	Yes	Additional Voices	
2017	Coco	No	No	No	Yes	Yes		Pixar Senior Creative Team
2018	Incredibles 2	No	No	No	No	Yes		Pixar Senior Creative Team
2019	Toy Story 4	No	No	No	No	Yes		Pixar Senior Creative Team
2020	Soul	No	No	No	No	Yes	Windstar	Additional Story Contributions
2023	Elemental	No	No	No	No	Yes	Bernie Lumen	
2024	Inside Out 2	No	No	No	No	Yes		Additional Screenplay Material

==== Short films ====
Year	Title	Director	Writer	Production Designer	Background Designer
2005	One Man Band	No	No	Yes	No
2009	Leonardo	No	No	No	Additional
2009	Dug's Special Mission	Yes	Yes	No	No

=== Television series ===
Year	Title	Director	Storyboard Artist	Character Designer
1990	Widget, the World Watcher	No	Yes	No
1991	Where's Waldo?	No	Yes	No
1992–95	Batman: The Animated Series	No	Yes	Yes
1993–94	Mighty Max	No	No	Yes
1995	Freakazoid!	Yes	No	No

== Bibliography ==
- Fragments (Fragments Filigree Factory Production, 2003), illustrator
- Paper Biscuit (Half Life, 2003), writer, illustrator
- Paper Biscuit One Point Five (2003), writer, illustrator
- Batman: Black and White, Vol. 2 (DC Comics, 2003), illustrator
- Paper Biscuit 2 (2004), writer, illustrator
- Project: Superior (AdHouse Books, 2005), illustrator
- Three Trees Make a Forest (Gingko Press, 2006), illustrator
- My Name is Dug (Disney Press, 2009), illustrator
- And There You Are (AdHouse Books, 2009), writer, illustrator

== Awards and nominations ==
- Eisner Award, Best Single Issue, Batman Adventures Holiday Special (with Paul Dini and Bruce Timm), 1995
- Daytime Emmy Award Outstanding Special Class Animated Program: Director, Freakazoid, 1996
- Annie Award, Storyboarding in an Animated Feature Production, Spirit: Stallion of the Cimarron, 2003
- Annie Award Nomination, Storyboarding in an Animated Feature Production, WALL-E, 2009
- Annie Award Nomination, Storyboarding in an Animated Feature Production, Up, 2010
- National Cartoonists Society, Animated Feature Division Award, Up, 2010
- Academy Award for Best Original Screenplay Nomination, Inside Out (with Pete Docter, Meg LeFauve and Josh Cooley), 2015
