= Trailer Park, Inc. =

Marketing firm

Trailer Park Group
- Type: Private
- Industry: Entertainment
- Founded: 1994
- Headquarters: Hollywood, California
- Number of employees: 600
- Parent: Erie Street Growth Partners
- Website: www.trailerparkgroup.com

Trailer Park Group is a marketing firm with operations across North America, Europe, and Asia-Pacific. It broadly specializes in the media and entertainment industries, including film, television, streaming, brands, gaming, and sports sectors.

Trailer Park Group is a portfolio company of the private equity firm, Erie Street Growth Partners.

== History ==
Trailer Park Group was founded in 1994 as Trailer Park, Inc.by Jim Hale and Tim Nett, referred to as Trailer Park. Originally a motion picture advertising production company, it eventually expanded into other sectors of the entertainment industry.

In February 2005, the Chicago-based private equity firm Lake Capital invested in Trailer Park. In December 2005, Trailer Park merged with Creative Domain, a large agency with a digital division. In July 2007, Trailer Park entered another merger with Art Machine, a leading print design agency.

In Spring 2008, the firm hired Rick Eiserman as its CEO. Eiserman was previously managing director of Young & Rubicam, and co-founder of BrandBuzz.

In February 2010, Trailer Park acquired goodness Mfg., an advertising firm known for brand-oriented campaigns. In 2018, they acquired Mirada Studios, an American creative agency and production company founded in 2010.

Trailer Park's marketing offering spans theatrical, home entertainment, television, print & design, digital, social, mobile, interactive TV, menus, content, digital publishing, video games and brand.

=== 2020–present ===
Trailer Park rebranded to Trailer Park Group in 2020. In 2021, Trailer Park Group received a growth investment from advisory firm, Erie Street.

In November 2022, it was announced that Trailer Park Group acquired the London-based creative agency, MXW Studios.

Trailer Park Group acquired Mumbai-based White Turtle Studios, a creative and production studio in 2022. That same year, they acquired Dark Burn Creative (“DBC”), a Los Angeles based gameplay video production company, originally founded in 2014. In 2022, Trailer Park Group also launched a new game marketing division, called Mutiny, which supports brands like Xbox, Riot Games, and Ubisoft.

== Recognition ==
Trailer Park Group’s work and staff have been recognized throughout the entertainment industry, receiving various accolades. From 2022 to 2024, the Clio Entertainment Awards has awarded Trailer Park Group with 173 awards, across Grand, Gold, Silver, and Bronze categories, including being named Agency of the Year in 2022. The firm has earned 15 Golden Trailer Awards from 2023 to 2025.
