= Meg LeFauve =

American screenwriter and film producer (born 1969)

- Born: October 19, 1969 (age 56); Warren, Ohio, U.S.
- Education: Syracuse University
- Occupations: Screenwriter; film producer
- Years active: 1998–present
- Spouse: Joe Forte
- Children: 2

Meg LeFauve (born October 19, 1969) is an American screenwriter and film producer. She is best known for writing the screenplays for the Pixar animated films Inside Out (2015), its sequel Inside Out 2 (2024), and The Good Dinosaur (2015), the former being nominated for the Academy Award for Best Original Screenplay.

== Early life ==
LeFauve was raised in Warren, Ohio, and attended Syracuse University.

== Career ==
LeFauve began her film career as a president and producer of Egg Pictures, Jodie Foster's film company. During that time, LeFauve produced films that were nominated for an Emmy, a Golden Globe, and was awarded a Peabody for Jane Anderson's Showtime film, The Baby Dance. LeFauve produced The Dangerous Lives of Altar Boys for Egg Pictures. Starring Kieran Culkin, Jodie Foster and Vincent D'Onofrio, the film opened to rave reviews and won the 2003 Independent Spirit Award for Best First Feature.

LeFauve was a mentor at Meryl Streep's writer's lab, and is currently a consultant to Screen New South Wales, Screen Australia, and Film Victoria. She has mentored at the Sundance Creative Producer Lab and is a board member and returning participant at CineStory Script Sessions. LeFauve has taught at AFI and served as co-chair of the Graduate Producers Program at UCLA's School of Film and Television, where she taught master level story and development classes for over seven years. LeFauve also has been known to give seminars from time to time.

She was nominated for the Academy Award for Best Original Screenplay for co-writing the script for Pixar's Inside Out (2015), and returned to co-write the script along with Dave Holstein for the sequel Inside Out 2 (2024). She was nominated for Primetime Emmy Awards in 1999 for producing The Baby Dance. She also produced the 2002 film The Dangerous Lives of Altar Boys. She also wrote the script for another Pixar film The Good Dinosaur (2015) which was nominated for a Golden Globe. LeFauve received a "story by" credit on the live action Captain Marvel movie (2019).

=== Podcast ===
Meg LeFauve co-hosts a Podcast, The Screenwriting Life w/ Meg LeFauve and Lorien McKenna. The show, co-hosted by writer Lorien McKenna and producer Jeffrey Crane Graham, is dedicated to unpacking both the craft and artistic journey of pursuing a career in screenwriting. Featured guests include Ed Solomon, Anne Lamott, Mike Jones, and Bonnie Curtis, among others.

The show was cited as one of Feedspot's Top 25 Screenwriting Podcasts You Must Follow in 2021, FilmCon's Top 10 Recommended Filmmaking Podcasts., and Podcast Magazine's Top 8 Must-Listen Podcasts For Screenwriters.

== Personal life ==
LeFauve is married to filmmaker Joe Forte.

== Filmography ==
Year	Film	Credited as			
Year	Film	Writer	Producer	Other	Notes
1998	The Baby Dance	No	Yes	No	
2000	Waking the Dead	No	No	Yes	Special thanks
2002	The Dangerous Lives of Altar Boys	No	Yes	No	
2010–2011	Gigantic	Yes	No	No	3 episodes: "Perfect Complications" "Carpe Diem" "Back to Normal"
2015	Inside Out	Yes	No	No	Annie Award for Writing in a Feature Production; Washington D.C. Area Film Critics Association Award for Best Original Screenplay; Nominated – Academy Award for Best Original Screenplay; Nominated – BAFTA Award for Best Original Screenplay; Nominated – Chicago Film Critics Association Award for Best Original Screenplay; Nominated – Online Film Critics Society Award for Best Original Screenplay; Nominated – Satellite Award for Best Original Screenplay
2015	Oddball	Yes	No	No	Script editor
2015	The Good Dinosaur	Yes	No	No	Nominated – Golden Globe
2016	Finding Dory	No	No	Yes	Special thanks
2016	The Man Who Saved Ben-Hur	No	No	Yes	Special thanks
2018	Incredibles 2	No	No	Yes	Special thanks
2019	Captain Marvel	Story	No	No	
2020	Onward	Story	No	No	Additional story material
2022	My Father's Dragon	Yes	Executive	No	
2024	Inside Out 2	Yes	No	No	
