= Blush =

Blush may refer to:

- Blushing, the physiological occurrence of temporary redness of the face as an emotional response
- Blush (cosmetics) or rouge, a cosmetic
- Blush (magazine), a Canadian lifestyle magazine
- Blush wine, a kind of rosé wine
- Blush (color), a medium bright tone of red-violet
- Blush, Albania
- Blush, a Crayola crayon color
- Blush (surname)

== Film and television ==
- Blush (1995 film), a Chinese film
- Blush (2015 film), an Israeli film
- Blush (2019 film), an American film
- Blush (2021 film), an animated short film on Apple TV+
- Blush: The Search for the Next Great Makeup Artist, a 2008 American reality TV show
- "Blush" (Kim Possible), an episode of Kim Possible
- Blush, a 2002 dance program and 2005 film by Wim Vandekeybus

== Music ==
- Blush (Asian band), a pan-Asian girl band
- Blush (Mexican band), a 2011 all-girl rock-pop band from Mexico
- Blush, a 1980 album by Lani Hall
- Blush, a band signed to Surfdog Records
- Blush (Kevin Abstract album)
- Blush (Wa Wa Nee album), 1989
- Blush (Moose Blood album)
- Blush (Maya Hawke album)
- Blush (PVA album)
- Blush (EP), a 2013 EO by Wolf Alice
- "Blush" (Wooah song), 2024
- Blush (Jeffree Star song), 2010
- Blush (Bini song), 2026
- "Blush", a song by Aly & AJ from Insomniatic
- "Blush", a song by The Hummingbirds from loveBUZZ
- "Blush (Only You)", a song by Plumb from Chaotic Resolve

== Characters ==
- Blush, a female mascot for Children in Need 2009
- Blush, a character in the manga Et Cetera (manga)

== See also ==
- Blush Blush, a dating sim developed by Sad Panda Studios
- Blusher, a group of mushroom species
