= Derujinsky =

Derujinsky is a surname. Notable people with the surname include:

- Gleb Derujinsky (1925–2011), American fashion photographer
- Gleb W. Derujinsky (1888–1975), Russian-American sculptor
