= Wrong Again =

Wrong Again may refer to:

- Wrong Again (film), a 1929 synchronized sound short subject film
- "Wrong Again" (song), a 1998 single by Martina McBride
- "Wrong Again", song by Maya Hawke from the album Chaos Angel
- "Wrong Again", song by Nick Jonas from the album Nicholas Jonas
- Regain Records, Swedish record label formerly named Wrong Again Records
