= Anxiety (Inside Out) =

2024 animated film character

- Inside Out character
- First appearance: Inside Out 2 (2024)
- Created by: Kelsey Mann; Meg LeFauve
- Based on: Anxiety (emotion)
- Voiced by: Maya Hawke

In-universe information
- Species: Emotion
- Gender: Female

Anxiety is a fictional character of the 2024 Disney/Pixar film Inside Out 2. Voiced by Maya Hawke, she is a personification of Riley Andersen's anxiety, who takes residence in her mind shortly after she enters puberty. Anxiety usurps control of Riley's behavior from Joy, intending to direct her to succeed at joining her high school hockey team and avoid loneliness.

Anxiety has been well received by critics, who praised her personality and Hawke's performance, while other critics highlighted the panic attack scenes.

== Development ==
=== Conception and writing ===
In the early drafts of Inside Out 2 (2024), Anxiety was intended to be an antagonistic force. Kelsey Mann, the director of the film, said that she felt like a "cardboard villain", and was unsatisfied with the writing. He hired two psychologists as advisers, Lisa Damour and Dacher Keltner, and they decided to rewrite it so that Anxiety would be motivated by the love of Riley Andersen. Lisa Damour stated that one of the ways to solve anxiety, grounding, or touching a physical object, inspired a scene where Riley overcomes a panic attack by touching a hockey stick. Originally, she was going to create a shape-shifting monster who would lie about who she was, but that was changed so as not to complicate the story. Character designer Deanna Marsigliese then toned down the character to "make something a little more accessible."

Production Jason Deamer had noticed that the male emotions Fear and Anger were more stylized than the female ones and suggested that the same quality be brought to the new female emotions. Marsigliese designed Anxiety to echo that of Fear, as the two emotions are "distant cousins." The two characters share the same large, intense eyes, but Anxiety has a horizontal design in contrast to Fear's vertical design.

Marsiglieese chose physical characteristics "that would influence [Anxiety's] tics and nervousness." Anxiety wears an itchy turtleneck sweater, high pants, and tight boots, all to make her appear in a constant state of discomfort. Her hair is based on carrot greens: stiff at the root and light at the tips, which help act as "a conduit for all her trembling and twitching." According to Bonafacio, various poses were chosen for the hair—a more relaxed hairstyle, a softer one, a rougher one—so the animators could say, "She goes from a soft hairstyle to a stiff, more upright one at this very moment."

=== Voice and animation ===
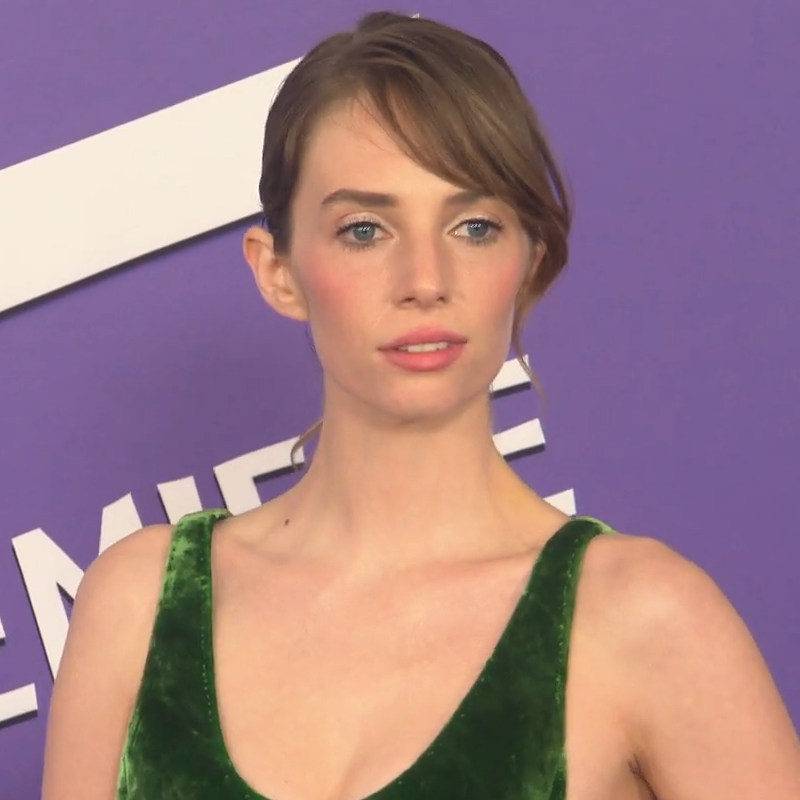
Maya Hawke voices Anxiety in the film.

On November 9, 2023, Maya Hawke was revealed to be voicing the character. Mann auditioned Hawke via Zoom at the office of a back room in Epcot during a family vacation with his kids after Nielsen told him that Hawke was available to audition just then, with her anxious performance driving him to tears. Uncut Gems was cited as an inspiration for all of Anxiety's scenes, specially the visually intensive ones.

Anxiety's mouth was a difficult part to animate for the animators, as they felt the teeth were important. In the original sketches, there were no teeth, so "we had to figure out how to give it a wide range of expressions without the teeth being held together by something." According to Anderson, this was done so the animators could tailor their performance to that design. Bonifacio commented, "It's very present with all those teeth and lip controls, and it's not inside a skull like our normal mouths. So it was very difficult to determine the right amount of controls and how to give the animator something that was intuitive."

The anxiety attack was one of the defining moments of the film. According to cinematographers Jonathan Pytko and Adam Habib, "We wanted to show an image that was compelling. It's not something you want to just throw away." It becomes a "frenetic whirlwind" as Riley gets deeper into the attack. And when she calms down, the "color shifts from a cooler tone to a warmer tone to start bringing that joy back into the frame," Pytko said. According to Anderson, for the animation of this scene, "She starts moving really fast and turns into this whirlwind. He ended up animating 106 Anxieties in about eight shots. In one shot, there might have been upward of 10 or 15 Anxieties — multiple arms and heads going around in circles."

== Appearances ==
=== Inside Out 2 ===
She is one of the four new emotions inside Riley Andersen's mind. After Riley goes to an ice hockey summer camp, she decides to take over Riley's brain entirely. Joy and the other main emotions are stranded, and are forced to come back. Anxiety tries to mold Riley in her own image, causing Riley to be obsessed with succeeding in hockey. At one point, Riley has a panic attack. However, by the end of the film, the other emotions come back.

=== Video games ===
On June 13, 2024, the day before Inside Out 2's release, kart-racing game Disney Speedstorm began its eighth season, Journey of Emotions, which is based on Inside Out, where Anxiety is an unlockable character.

In December 2024, she was included in the video game Disney Magic Kingdoms as a playable character to unlock for a limited time.

== Reception ==
Anxiety has been very well-received by specialized critics. Meg Walter of Deseret said that the film helped her understand her own anxiety. Noah Berlatsky, in a CNN article, said that "I appreciate the way that "Inside Out 2" gives its anxious antagonist a heart and some positive characteristics amidst its frantic quivering" Alana James of The Conversation found Anxiety to be a positive emotion as it "masters the situation and comes across as forward-looking and helps Riley avoid negative consequences." She concluded that "it can be helpful, as long as it doesn't become overwhelming." Candice McMillan of Seattle Refined said, "Anxiety is perfectly imperfect, a beautiful mix of overconfidence and constant mental upheaval. It's nice to finally have a name for the feelings that previous generations were forced to 'cope' with," while Bj Colangelo of /Film considered it an important emotion for his life since it helped him in his youth and also said that "Sometimes Anxiety gets a little carried away, but it's not malicious: it's our brain trying to help. Just as Riley's bad memories, previously relegated to the background, flooded the mind, mine did too. [...] And it doesn't matter. I didn't need to think, I needed to feel."

Maya Hawke's performance has been very well-received by critics. Owen Gleiberman of Variety praised Hawke's performance as Anxiety, calling it a "grotesquely styled voice that might as well have been called Caffeinated Calculus or Desire to Belong or Obsessive-Compulsive Social Climbing FOMO," while Cindy White of The A.V. Club said they "bring some much needed energy to the Headquarters scenes." Sergio Burstein of the Los Angeles Times said her voice was "remarkably vocally performed," while David Ehrlich of IndieWire said Hawke's performance was "fantastic in embodying an almost antagonistic sentiment that wants the best for Riley, but will ruin her life if allowed to take control," and Jordan Hoffman for Entertainment Weekly said her performance was "energetic." Amy Amatangelo of Paste said, "And Hawke, as the increasingly frantic emotion that thinks it's helping until she realizes too late that it isn't, plays Anxiety perfectly." Justin Chang of NPR said, "Hawke does a great job of making his character's slightly twitchy, polite routine a little more annoying—and sinister—with each scene."

The anxiety attack scene has been a standout scene in the film. Charlotte O'Sullivan of The Observer described her anxiety attack as: "It's equally upsetting to watch Anxiety, frozen with terror, inside a dense, fluorescent-orange forest of looping thoughts." Calene Lee of The Teen Magazine called the scene "an accurate portrayal of anxiety." Dan Kois of Slate said the scene is "heartbreaking to watch, especially for anyone who's experienced one themselves or watched their child deal with a severe emotional spiral." Emily Murray of GamesRadar+ called it one of the best depictions of Anxiety, and that director Kelsey Mann said it was "one of her favorite scenes." Maya Phillips of The New York Times said it reflected her own anxiety, citing the film's target demographic as young and old, concluding, "Perhaps the upshot is that, when young fans of 'Inside Out' inevitably get caught in one of those brutal, anxious thought storms, they can conjure up a clear picture of the chaos in their minds, as if it were a bright, colorful Pixar movie. Perhaps then they can recognize that orange bearer of terrible news and gently guide it to a seat."

== See also ==
- Joy (Inside Out) - another Inside Out emotion
