= Moss (Maya Hawke album) =

Studio album by Maya Hawke
- Released: September 23, 2022
- Studio: Long Pond Studios
- Length: 44:36
- Label: Mom + Pop
- Producer: Benjamin Lazar Davis; Jonathan Low; Maya Hawke

Maya Hawke chronology
Blush (2020)	Moss (2022)	Chaos Angel (2024)

Singles from Moss
- 1. "Thérèse" Released: June 29, 2022; 2. "Sweet Tooth" Released: August 16, 2022; 3. "Luna Moth" Released: September 21, 2022

Moss is the second studio album by American singer-songwriter and actress Maya Hawke, released on September 23, 2022 through Mom + Pop. It is the follow-up to her positively received debut album Blush (2020).

== Background ==
On June 29, 2022, Hawke announced Moss alongside the release of the first single "Thérèse". "Thérèse" was inspired by a Balthus painting at the Metropolitan Museum of Art called "Thérèse Dreaming". Hawke has identified with the girl in the "Thérèse Dreaming" painting "who in my head is me" in the track. Hawke cited Taylor Swift's album Folklore (2020) as an inspiration for the sound of Moss.

According to a press release from Mom + Pop, Moss serves as "Hawke's meditation on rebirth and acceptance".

== Release ==
Moss was released on September 23, 2022, as a digital download, for streaming, and on CD and vinyl LP formats. An exclusive release of Moss was also available from Urban Outfitters as a translucent pink vinyl LP. A translucent orange LP is available from Maya Hawke's official website.

== Critical reception ==
Professional ratings
Aggregate scores
Source	Rating
AnyDecentMusic?	7.1/10
Metacritic	71/100
Review scores
Source	Rating
Clash	8/10
Dork	4/5 stars
The Forty-Five	4/5 stars
The Line of Best Fit	7/10
NME	4/5 stars
Pitchfork	7.2/10
The Telegraph	4/5 stars
Under the Radar	8/10

Moss was met with "generally favorable" reviews from critics. At Metacritic, which assigns a weighted average rating out of 100 to reviews from mainstream publications, this release received an average score of 71, based on 9 reviews.

In a four star review, Rhian Daly of NME wrote that Moss is "fresh" and "presents Hawke in wiser form" both lyrically and sonically from her debut album Blush. A review in The Forty-Five called the album was a "more confident and experimental departure" from Blush, praising Hawke's intimate vocal performance. Vicky Greer of The Line of Best Fit identified "Thérèse" and "Bloomed Into Blue" as some of the best songs on the album, which she called a "gorgeous outing for Maya Hawke".

== Track listing ==
Moss track listing
No.	Title	Writer(s)	Length
1.	"Backup Plan"	Maya Hawke; Christian Lee Hutson	3:17
2.	"Bloomed Into Blue"	Hawke; Benjamin Lazar Davis	3:25
3.	"Hiatus"	Hawke; Hutson	3:37
4.	"Sweet Tooth"	Hawke; Hutson	3:41
5.	"Crazy Kid" (featuring Will Graefe)	Hawke; Graefe	3:37
6.	"Luna Moth"	Hawke; Hutson	3:24
7.	"South Elroy"	Hawke; Graefe	3:13
8.	"Thérèse"	Hawke; Davis	3:27
9.	"Sticky Little Words"	Hawke; Graefe	2:26
10.	"Over"	Hawke; Hutson	3:49
11.	"Restless Moon"	Hawke; Graefe	3:29
12.	"Driver"	Hawke; Hutson	3:25
13.	"Mermaid Bar"	Hawke; Davis	3:36
Total length:			44:36

== Personnel ==
Credits are adapted from Tidal.

- Maya Hawke – performance, production
- Benjamin Lazar Davis – production
- Jonathan Low – engineering, mixing, additional production on "Sweet Tooth" and "Driver"
- JT Bates – engineering
- Marshall Vore – engineering
- Joe Lambert – mastering

== Charts ==
Chart performance for Moss
Chart (2022)	Peak position
Scottish Albums (OCC)	82
UK Independent Albums (OCC)	44
