= Maya Hawke =

American actress (born 1998)

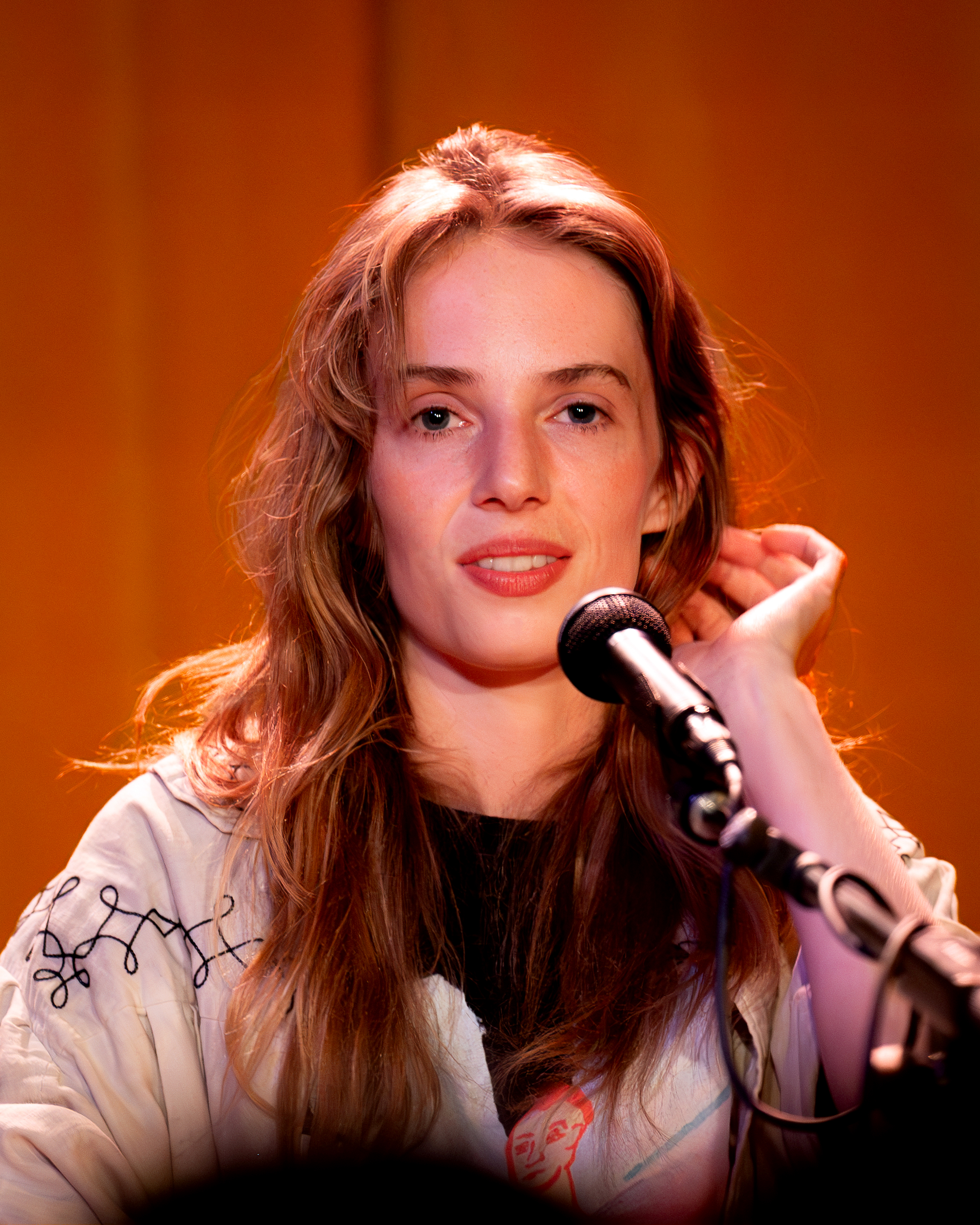
- Hawke in April 2026
- Born: Maya Ray Thurman-Hawke; July 8, 1998 (age 28); New York City, U.S.
- Education: Juilliard School
- Occupations: Actress; singer-songwriter
- Years active: 2016–present
- Spouse: Christian Lee Hutson (m. 2026)
- Parents: Ethan Hawke (father); Uma Thurman (mother)
- Relatives: Levon Hawke (brother); Robert Thurman (maternal grandfather); Nena von Schlebrügge (maternal grandmother)
- Musical career
- Instrument: Vocals
- Label: Mom + Pop
- Website: www.mayahawkemusic.com

Maya Ray Thurman Hawke (born July 8, 1998) is an American actress and singer-songwriter. The daughter of Ethan Hawke and Uma Thurman, she began her career in modeling and made her screen debut as Jo March in the 2017 BBC adaptation of Little Women. She gained international recognition for starring as Robin Buckley in the Netflix science fiction horror series Stranger Things (2019–2025).

Hawke appeared in the films Once Upon a Time in Hollywood (2019), Fear Street Part One: 1994 (2021), Do Revenge (2022), Asteroid City (2023), Maestro (2023), Wildcat (2023), The Hunger Games: Sunrise on the Reaping (2026), and she voiced Anxiety in Inside Out 2 (2024). As a musician, she has released the albums Blush (2020), Moss (2022), Chaos Angel (2024), and Maitreya Corso (2026).

== Early life ==
Maya Ray Thurman Hawke was born on July 8, 1998, in New York City, to actors Ethan Hawke and Uma Thurman and raised in Goshen, New York, where her future project The God of the Woods was filmed. Her parents met on the set of Gattaca (1997), married in May 1998, and divorced in 2005. Hawke has a younger brother, Levon. She also has two half-sisters by her father's second wife, Ryan Shawhughes, and another half-sister by her mother's ex-fiancé, financier Arpad Busson.

On her father's side, Hawke is a distant cousin of playwright Tennessee Williams. On her mother's side, she is a granddaughter of Buddhist scholar Robert Thurman and model Nena von Schlebrügge. Schlebrügge's mother, Birgit Holmquist, was also a model, having posed for Axel Ebbe's statue Famntaget, currently in Smygehuk, Sweden.

Hawke has dyslexia, which resulted in her changing schools frequently during her primary education before she finally enrolled at Saint Ann's School, a private school in Brooklyn, New York, that emphasizes artistic creativity and does not grade work. The artistic environment eventually led her to acting. Hawke also took part in summer studies at the Royal Academy of Dramatic Art in London and the Stella Adler Studio of Acting in New York. She studied toward a BFA in acting at the Juilliard School for a year before dropping out after accepting her role in Little Women.

== Career ==
=== Modeling ===
Like both her mother and grandmother, Hawke modeled for Vogue at the beginning of her career. She was also chosen as the face of the British fashion retailer AllSaints' 2016/2017 collection. In 2017, she starred as one of several faces in a video campaign for Calvin Klein's underwear range, directed by Sofia Coppola. In September 2022, Hawke modeled for Calvin Klein's FW22 Underwear campaign. She is currently a Prada brand ambassador, and appeared in their winter 2026 campaign alonside her Stranger Things costar, Sadie Sink.

=== Acting ===
Hawke was Sofia Coppola's choice to play the title role of The Little Mermaid in Universal Pictures's live-action adaptation, but the producers preferred Chloë Grace Moretz. This and other conflicts led Coppola to leave the project in 2015. Moretz eventually dropped out as well, and the film was not produced.

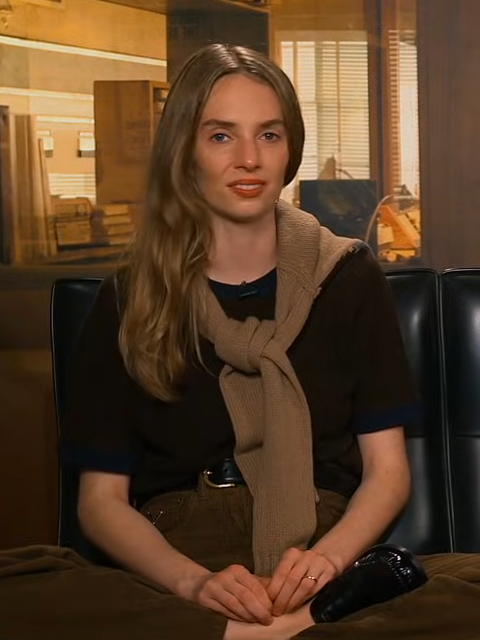
Hawke promoting Stranger Things season 5 in 2025

Hawke made her acting debut in 2017 as Jo March in the BBC miniseries adaptation of Little Women. In September 2018, she starred in the thriller Ladyworld, directed by Amanda Kramer. Hawke later broke out with her performance as Robin Buckley in the third season of Netflix's Stranger Things, which released in July 2019. Also that year, Hawke played Linda Kasabian/'Flowerchild' in Quentin Tarantino's Once Upon a Time in Hollywood, and co-starred in Marc Meyers's thriller film Human Capital, based on Stephen Amidon's 2004 novel of the same name.

In 2020, Hawke starred in Gia Coppola's sophomore film, Mainstream, alongside Andrew Garfield. The same year, she guest starred in the fifth episode of the miniseries The Good Lord Bird, which stars her father, Ethan Hawke. She stars as Annie Brown, the daughter of her father's character. In June, she appeared in Italian Studies, written and directed by Adam Leon and co-starring Vanessa Kirby. It premiered in the Tribeca Film Festival and was released in January 2022. Later that month, she appeared as Heather in the Netflix horror film Fear Street Part One: 1994. In 2021, she also starred in a spin-off podcast series based on her Stranger Things character, Rebel Robin: Surviving Hawkins. She starred in another scripted podcast series, The Playboy Interview, in which she plays Helen Gurley Brown.

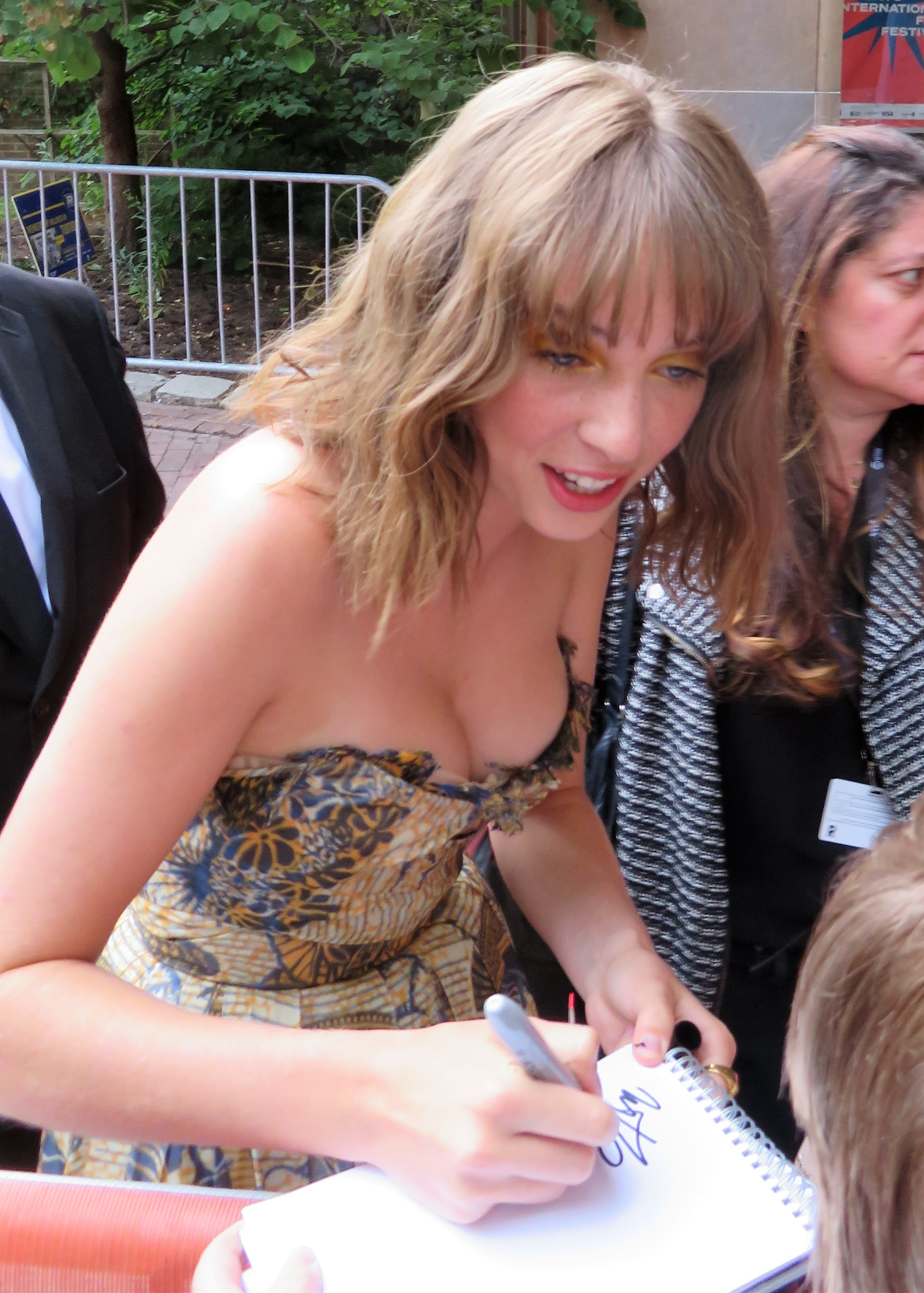
Hawke at the 2019 Toronto Film Festival premiere of Human Capital

In 2022, Hawke starred in Netflix's dark comedy film Do Revenge alongside Camila Mendes. In April 2022, she was cast in Bradley Cooper's biographical film about Leonard Bernstein, Maestro, co-starring Cooper and Carey Mulligan. In May, it was reported that she had been cast in the film The Kill Room alongside her mother, Uma Thurman, and Samuel L. Jackson. In July, it was announced that she would guest star in Disney's Moon Girl and Devil Dinosaur, which premiered in 2023. She appeared in the Wes Anderson romantic dramedy Asteroid City (2023), which premiered at the 76th Cannes Film Festival to positive reviews. She voiced the character Anxiety in the 2024 Pixar animated film Inside Out 2, the sequel to Inside Out (2015). In February 2024, it was reported that Hawke would star in a Billy Wilder biopic titled Wilder & Me. In May 2025, Hawke was announced to lead a biopic about Irish dancer Lucia Joyce, and was also announced as a part of The Hunger Games: Sunrise on the Reaping cast, playing a younger version of Wiress. In November 2026, it was announced that she would star in Matt Johnson's upcoming Magic: The Gathering film and in Guy Maddin, Galen Johnson, and Evan Johnson's The Confessions.

=== Music ===
In August 2019, Hawke released her first two singles, "To Love a Boy" and "Stay Open". The songs were written and recorded by Hawke and Grammy Award-winning singer-songwriter Jesse Harris. Hawke performed a series of headlining gigs around New York City in early 2020, her first ever solo live performances as a musician. In these shows, Hawke was supported by Benjamin Lazar Davis, Tōth, Will Graefe, and Nick Cianci, respectively. On March 18, 2020, Hawke released the first single, "By Myself", and announced her debut album, Blush, amid the 2020 Black Lives Matter protests. Hawke wrote: "I feel like this is not a time for self-promotion. It is a time for activation, education and self-examination." The album's second single, "Coverage", was released on April 22, 2020, and its video, directed by Maya's father Ethan Hawke, was released on April 28. Initially set for release on June 19, 2020, Blush was delayed to August 21, 2020. To support its release, Hawke appeared as a musical guest for the first time in her career on The Today Show in late August 2020.

On June 29, 2022, alongside the release of the single "Thérèse", Hawke announced her second album, Moss, which was released on September 23, 2022.

In April 2023, Hawke recorded her third studio album. The first single, "Missing Out", was released on February 14, 2024, and the second single, "Dark", on March 20. The full album, Chaos Angel, was released on May 31. She performed songs from the album on The Tonight Show Starring Jimmy Fallon, Jimmy Kimmel Live!, and The Daily Show. In October 2024, four additional songs from the album were released on the Clipped Wings EP.

In March 2026, Hawke released the single "Devil You Know" as the lead single to her May 2026 album Maitreya Corso.

Hawke has said that folk music has influenced her music, including Leonard Cohen, Patti Smith, and Joni Mitchell. She takes inspiration from "great lyricists" like Cohen and Bob Dylan as, according to her, "music is the best way to communicate poetry".

== Personal life ==
Hawke has said that she has no denominational beliefs but is "highly optimistic that there is something."

Hawke began a relationship with longtime friend and fellow musician Christian Lee Hutson in 2023. They married on February 14, 2026, in New York City. The wedding was attended by many of her Stranger Things costars, as well as Sam Nivola and Kathryn Newton, among others.

She originally resided in Greenwich Village, Manhattan before moving to Woodstock, New York.

== Acting credits ==
Key
†	Denotes films that have not yet been released

=== Film ===
Year	Title	Role	Notes	Ref.
2018	Ladyworld	Romy		
2019	Once Upon a Time in Hollywood	Flower Child		
2019	Human Capital	Shannon Hagel		
2020	Mainstream	Frankie		
2021	Italian Studies	Erin		
2021	Fear Street Part One: 1994	Heather Watkins		
2022	Do Revenge	Eleanor Levetan / Nora Cutler		
2023	Asteroid City	June Douglas / Lucretia Shaver		
2023	Wildcat	Flannery O'Connor	Also executive producer	
2023	Maestro	Jamie Bernstein		
2023	The Kill Room	Grace		
2024	Inside Out 2	Anxiety	Voice role	
2025	Videoheaven	Narrator	Documentary film	
2026	Wishful Thinking	Julia		
2026	The Non-Actor	Bella	Short film	
2026	One Night Only	Malika		
2026	The Hunger Games: Sunrise on the Reaping	Wiress		
	Unnamed Magic: The Gathering film †	TBA		
	The Confessions †	TBA		

=== Television ===
Year	Title	Role	Notes	Ref.
2017	Little Women	Jo March	Main role	
2018	Orchard House: Home of Little Women	Herself	Documentary special	
2019–2025	Stranger Things	Robin Buckley	Main role (season 3–5)	
2020	The Good Lord Bird	Annie Brown	Miniseries	
2022	The Last Movie Stars	Herself	TV documentary	
2023–2025	Moon Girl and Devil Dinosaur	Abyss	Voice role; 3 episodes	
2025	Nightmares of Nature	Self - Narrator		
2025	The American Revolution	Betsy Ambler (voice)	TV documentary	
	The God of the Woods †	Judy Luptack	Main role; series in production as of June 2026	

=== Video game ===
Year	Title	Role	Notes	Ref.
2024	Disney Speedstorm	Anxiety	Grouped under "Featuring the Voice Talents Of"	

=== Music videos ===
Year	Title	Artist	Album	Notes	Ref.
2019	"Goodnight, and Happy Birthday!"	Nick Cianci			
2019	"To Love a Boy"	Maya Hawke	Non-album single		
2019	"Juliette"	Tōth	Non-album single		
2020	"By Myself"	Maya Hawke	Blush		
2020	"Is There Something in the Movies?"	Samia	The Baby		
2020	"Generous Heart"	Maya Hawke	Blush	Also co-director	
2021	"Blue Hippo"	Maya Hawke	Non-album single		
2022	"Thérèse"	Maya Hawke	Moss		
2022	"Sweet Tooth"	Maya Hawke	Moss		
2024	"Missing Out"	Maya Hawke	Chaos Angel		
2024	"Dark"	Maya Hawke	Chaos Angel		
2026	"Lioness"	Maya Hawke	Maitreya Corso		

=== Theatre ===
Year	Title	Role	Venue(s)	Notes	Ref.
2025	Dry Land	Amy	Newman Mills Theater, New York	Main role; one-off benefit reading	
2025	Eurydice	Eurydice	Romulus Linney Courtyard Theatre, New York	Lead role	

=== Audio ===
Year	Title	Role	Notes	Ref.
2021	Rebel Robin: Surviving Hawkins	Robin Buckley	Main role	
2021	The Playboy Interview	Helen Gurley Brown	Main role	
2023	Supreme: The Battle for Roe	Sarah Weddington	Main role	
2026	The Summer Oath	Livia Gaines	Main role	
2026	The Chronicles of Astrimos	Calico Jones	Main role	

== Discography ==
=== Studio albums ===
- Blush (2020)
- Moss (2022)
- Chaos Angel (2024)
- Maitreya Corso (2026)

=== Extended plays ===
- Clipped Wings EP (2024)

=== Singles ===
Year	Title	Album	Ref.
2019	"To Love a Boy" / "Stay Open"	Non-album single	
2020	"By Myself"	Blush	
2020	"Coverage"	Blush	
2020	"So Long"	Blush	
2020	"Generous Heart"	Blush	
2021	"Blue Hippo"	Non-album single	
2022	"Thérèse"	Moss	
2022	"Sweet Tooth"	Moss	
2022	"Luna Moth"	Moss	
2023	"Coming Around Again"	Non-album single	
2024	"Missing Out"	Chaos Angel	
2024	"Dark"	Chaos Angel	
2024	"Hang in There"	Chaos Angel	
2024	"Kamikaze Comic"	Clipped Wings EP	
2026	"Devil You Know"	Maitreya Corso	
2026	"Bring Home My Man"	Maitreya Corso	
2026	"Lioness"	Maitreya Corso	

== Tours ==
- Tactless Tour (2023)
- Chaos Angel World Tour (2025)
- An Evening With Maya Hawke: The Maitreya Corso Tour (2026)

== Awards and nominations ==
Award	Year	Category	Work	Result	Ref.
Alliance of Women Film Journalists	2025	Best Animated/Voiced Performance	Inside Out 2	Nominated	
Annie Awards	2025	Outstanding Achievement for Voice Acting in a Feature Production	Inside Out 2	Nominated	
Astra Film Awards	2024	Best Voice Over Performance	Inside Out 2	Nominated	
Hollywood Critics Association TV Awards	2022	Best Supporting Actress in a Streaming Series, Drama	Stranger Things	Nominated	
Hunter Mountain Film Festival	2019	Best Actress	As They Slept	Won	
MTV Movie & TV Awards	2023	Best On-Screen Duo (Note: Shared with Camila Mendes)	Do Revenge	Nominated	
Saturn Awards	2019	Best Supporting Actress in Streaming Presentation	Stranger Things	Won	
Screen Actors Guild Awards	2020	Outstanding Performance by an Ensemble in a Drama Series (Note: Shared with the cast of Stranger Things season 3)	Stranger Things	Nominated	
St. Louis Film Critics Association	2024	Best Vocal Performance	Inside Out 2	Runner-up	
Washington D.C. Area Film Critics Association	2024	Best Voice Performance	Inside Out 2	Nominated	
Women's Image Network Awards	2019	Best Actress in a MFT Movie / Mini-Series	Little Women	Won	
