= Blush (surname) =

Blush is a surname. Notable people with the surname include:

- Brian Blush, American musician, guitarist for The Refreshments
- Heather Blush, Canadian jazz and blues singer
- Steven Blush, American author, publisher and promoter

Fictional characters:

- Fatima Blush, a character in the 1983 James Bond film Never Say Never Again
