= Von Schlebrügge =

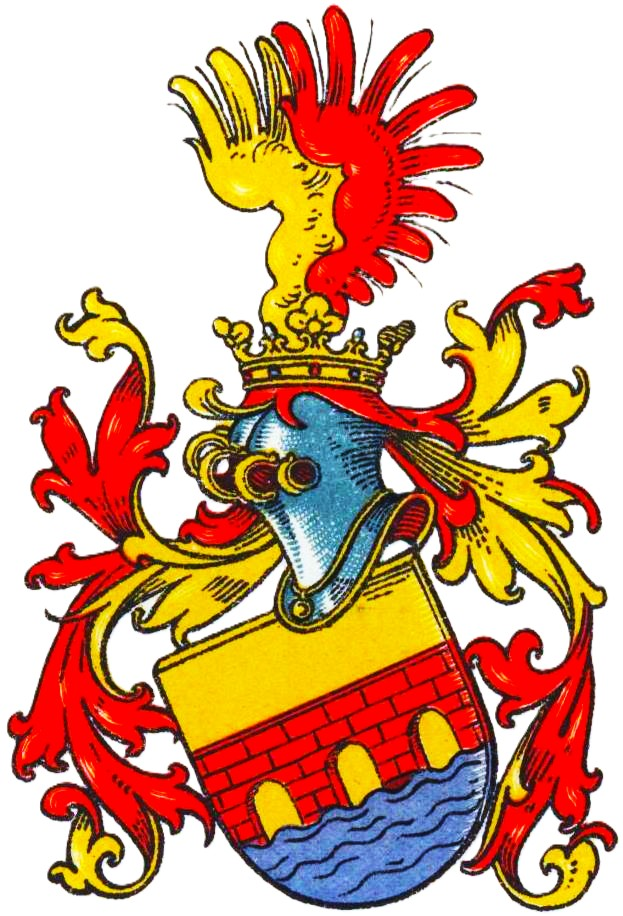
Coat of arms of the Schlebrügge family

The Schlebrügge family or von Schlebrügge is family of German nobility, originated in Westphalia, with descendants living today in Germany, Sweden, and Mexico.

== Notable members ==
- Hans von Schlebrügge (1900–1971), German military officer
- Max von Schlebrügge (born 1977), Swedish footballer
- Nena von Schlebrügge (born 1941), Mexican model
