= The Thicket (film) =

2024 film by Elliott Lester

- Theatrical release poster
- Directed by: Elliott Lester
- Screenplay by: Chris Kelley
- Based on: The Thicket by Joe R. Lansdale
- Produced by: Peter Dinklage; David Ginsberg; Chad Oakes; Michael Frislev; Caddy Vanasirikul; Brian O'Shea; Elliott Lester; Shannon Gaulding; Andre L III
- Starring: Peter Dinklage; Juliette Lewis; Esmé Creed-Miles; Levon Hawke; Andrew Schulz; James Hetfield; Leslie Grace; Gbenga Akinnagbe
- Cinematography: Guillermo Garza
- Edited by: Jean-Christophe Bouzy
- Music by: Ray Suen
- Production companies: Tubi Films; Nomadic Pictures; Estuary Films; Next Production
- Distributed by: Samuel Goldwyn Films
- Release date: September 6, 2024
- Running time: 105 minutes
- Country: United States
- Language: English

The Thicket is a 2024 American Western thriller film directed by Elliott Lester and written by Chris Kelley. It is a film adaptation of the 2014 novel by Joe R. Lansdale. It stars Peter Dinklage, Juliette Lewis, Esmé Creed-Miles, Levon Hawke, Andrew Schulz, James Hetfield, Leslie Grace, and Gbenga Akinnagbe.

== Plot ==
The murderous outlaw Cut-Throat Bill rides into town on the same morning Lula and Jack Parker's father dies of smallpox, leaving the siblings orphaned. Their grandfather, Caleb, entrusts Jack with his new will - deeding all of Caleb's land in Montana, 700 acres, to Jack and Lula upon his death. On their way to their aunt's farm in Kansas, the trio are accosted at a ferry by Cut-Throat Bill and her gang of miscreants. After a tense stand-off, Caleb shoots Bill (though she is barely wounded) and Bill murders him in turn. Bill then abducts Lula, whom she had expressed an interest in, and leaves Jack for dead.

Fleeing from the scene of the kidnapping, Bill and her gang hold up a dry-goods store in Sylvester. Lula, regaining consciousness, attempts to warn the store owner's son and run away, but is recaptured as gunfire erupts. Bill clears out in a hurry, having killed both the store owner and his son, but leaves a man behind in the chaos of the scene.

Jack Parker, waking to find his grandfather dead and his sister kidnapped, wanders into Sylvester while trying to track Bill down and happens to arrive just as the abandoned member of Bill's gang is being lynched by the enraged townsfolk. In the frenzy of the mob, and while desperately trying to question the man before he is killed, Jack witnesses another girl being dragged into a wagon and kidnapped before he is once again beaten into unconsciousness.

Meanwhile, a duo of bounty hunter and undertaker Reginald Jones and Eustace Howard just finished off their latest bounty. However, when Jones demands payment from the Alderman, he only gets paid half of the agreed upon amount and is insulted for his dwarfism. Furious, Jones stabs the Alderman in the hand and robs him to get the full payment and escapes. Jack enlists the duo for help to rescue his sister with the promise of huge bounty on Bill's head. The Alderman hires Sheriff Simon Deasy and Deputy Malachi Deasy to kill Jones in retaliation.

At a town, Jack tries to rescue his old crush, Jimmy Sue from her pimp, Hector; they get into a fight, Jack knocks out Hector and the pair escape. Bill's gang tells Lula that they are heading to a place called the Thicket, which is their hideout in the mountains and that Bill has been known to kidnap young girls.

Jones and Eustace capture a gang member and torture him for information of the gang's whereabouts. Jones is disappointed that the bounty on Bill's head is far too low to be worth the hunt so he and Eustace leave. Jack tries to interrogate the gang member but he dies from the injuries sustained during the torture. Lula tries to escape and bumps into Simon and Malachi, who promise to protect her until they collect the bounty on Jones's head. Bill comes to recapture Lula and kills Simon much to Malachi's distress.

Jack and Jimmy track down Jones and Eustace and offer to pay them the deed of his late grandfather's land to help him rescue Lula, which they accept. They track down Bill's gang and prepare to ambush them but Jones stops them since Lula is in the line of fire. Malachi joins the group to get revenge for Simon's death.

Bill reaches a church and burns it down. The group encounters the surviving priest who tells them about Bill's past: Bill was the daughter of a prostitute who severely abused her as she saw Bill's existence as sinful. Reaching her breaking point, Bill tortured her mother to death. The group then continues their journey toward the Thicket and Jones reveals that, after his mother committed suicide, he was sold to a freak show, by his father, due to his dwarfism.

As they reach the Thicket, Malachi rushes to infiltrate the place but gets killed by a gang member outside an outhouse; Jimmy shoots the man dead. As the fight ensues, Jimmy is stabbed to death by a gang member as she kills him with her knife. Bill takes Lula hostage and tries to kill Jack but she runs out of bullets. Lula tries to pummel Bill to death but Bill turns the table and is ready to slash her throat only for Jones to finish her off with a long-range shot. Eustace is mortally wounded in a fight and shares his final moment with Jones before dying. Jack also passes away after he succumbs to his wounds from Bill's gunshots.

A grief-stricken Lula decapitates Bill and presents her head to the sheriff, who reveals that Bill's bounty increase was real, and the duo receive a huge reward. Jones and Lula decide to settle down as family as Lula buries her brother and grandfather.

== Cast ==
- Peter Dinklage as Reginald Jones, a bounty hunter helping Jack
- Juliette Lewis as Cut Throat Bill, a gang leader
- Esmé Creed-Miles as Lula Parker, Jack's sister
- Levon Hawke as Jack Parker, a man searching for his abducted sister
- Andrew Schulz as Hector, a pimp
- James Hetfield as Simon Deasy, bounty hunter turned sheriff
- Leslie Grace as Jimmy Sue, a prostitute
- Gbenga Akinnagbe as Eustace Howard, an ex-slave who assists Jack
- Arliss Howard as Reverend Ephron Karlsson
- Macon Blair as Malachi Deasy, bounty hunter turned deputy sheriff.
- Ned Dennehy as Baldy

== Production ==
Peter Dinklage has been attached to the project for many years, being linked with the project in 2014 along with producer Gianni Nunnari, Shannon Gaulding and Andre Lemmers. The film has been described as a "passion project" for him. The film began pre-production in February 2020 with Dinklage, Noomi Rapace and Charlie Plummer joining the cast, but was impacted by the COVID-19 pandemic. In early 2023, Juliette Lewis joined the cast to replace Rapace. Metallica frontman James Hetfield was confirmed as amongst the cast. The Exchange, Orogen Entertainment, Hollywood Gang, and Milu Entertainment executive produced the film.

Principal photography began in Calgary, Alberta, Canada on March 1 and wrapped on March 30, 2023.

== Release ==
Tubi acquired the United States and Canada rights when it joined as co-financier, while The Exchange handles international distribution. It was released theatrically in the United States by Samuel Goldwyn Films on September 6, 2024. Additionally, the film made its French debut at the 2024 Deauville American Film Festival the week of September 8.

== Reception ==
On the review aggregator website Rotten Tomatoes, 80% of 30 critics' reviews are positive, with an average rating of 7.2/10. Metacritic, which uses a weighted average, assigned the film a score of 55 out of 100, based on 7 critics, indicating "mixed or average" reviews.
