= Chaos Angel =

2024 studio album by Maya Hawke

Studio album by Maya Hawke
- Released: May 31, 2024
- Studios: The Outlier Inn (Woodstock); Electric Lady (New York City)
- Length: 35:32
- Label: Mom + Pop
- Producer: Christian Lee Hutson

Maya Hawke chronology
Moss (2022)	Chaos Angel (2024)	Maitreya Corso (2026)

Singles from Chaos Angel
- 1. "Missing Out" Released: February 14, 2024; 2. "Dark" Released: March 20, 2024; 3. "Hang in There" Released: April 24, 2024

Chaos Angel is the third studio album by American singer-songwriter and actress Maya Hawke. It was released on May 31, 2024, via Mom + Pop.

== Background ==
In October 2023, Hawke sung alongside her father Ethan Hawke on a cover of the Willie Nelson song "We Don't Run" from his 1996 album Spirit.

On February 14, 2024, alongside the debut of single "Missing Out", it was announced that Chaos Angel would be releasing May 31, 2024.

== Writing and recording ==
On Chaos Angel, Hawke reunites with regular contributors Christian Lee Hutson, Benjamin Lazar Davis and Will Graefe who she worked with on Moss. The album was recorded at the Outlier Inn in Woodstock, New York and Electric Lady Studios in New York City. Hawke says that her third LP is an "altogether happier album" than its predecessor Moss. Hawke cited James Blake and Adrianne Lenker as musical influences on Chaos Angel. Most of Chaos Angel was recorded before Hawke shot the film Wildcat in January and February 2023, except the closing title track that was written and recorded after principal photography on Wildcat had concluded.

"Dark" was written when Hawke was experiencing a period of severe anxiety about falling asleep. With fears that "my brain would forget how to breathe and I would die in my sleep", Hawke saw a doctor who told her that she "had to become okay with dying". The track's chorus was written before the release of Moss but was set aside as Hawke said it "felt too real to me to finish that song and put it on that record".

== Release and promotion ==
The first single from Chaos Angel to be released was the alt-pop track "Missing Out" on February 14, 2024. The track deals with Hawke's experience of living near Brown University where her younger brother attended college. She partied with his classmates in an attempt to capture the formative college experience she never had. She recalled feeling in "a different place in my life than these people I was around". In a review for Exclaim!, Karlie Rogers called the track "a captivating, dizzying portrait, painted with careful precision". The music video for "Missing Out" was directed by Alex Ross Perry. On February 28, Hawke performed "Missing Out" on The Tonight Show Starring Jimmy Fallon.

On March 14, 2024, Hawke announced that the second single to be released from Chaos Angel would be "Dark" on March 20.

"Hang in There" was released as the third single from Chaos Angel on April 24, 2024. The track deals with supporting a friend who has been in a toxic relationship while acknowledging "the restraint required when you can't intervene for fear of being pushed away". According to Dork, "Hang In There" evokes singer-songwriters like Joni Mitchell.

== Critical reception ==
Professional ratings
Aggregate scores
Source	Rating
AnyDecentMusic?	7.4/10
Metacritic	81/100
Review scores
Source	Rating
AllMusic	3.5/5 stars
Far Out	3/5 stars
The Line of Best Fit	9/10
Under the Radar	8/10

Chaos Angel received a score of 81 out of 100 on review aggregator Metacritic based on four critics' reviews, which the website categorized as "universal acclaim". Andy Von Pip's review for Under the Radar called Chaos Angel Hawke's "most intricate and thematically rich work yet".

== Track listing ==
Chaos Angel track listing
No.	Title	Writer(s)	Length
1.	"Black Ice"	Maya Hawke; Levon Hawke; Jesse Harris; Christian Lee Hutson	4:44
2.	"Dark"	M. Hawke; Benjamin Lazar Davis	3:13
3.	"Missing Out"	M. Hawke; Bridget Kearney; Will Graefe; Davis; L. Hawke	3:37
4.	"Wrong Again"	M. Hawke; Kearney; Graefe; Davis	3:37
5.	"Okay"	M. Hawke; Kearney; Graefe; Davis	3:58
6.	"Better"	M. Hawke; Hutson	1:18
7.	"Big Idea"	M. Hawke	3:42
8.	"Hang in There"	M. Hawke; Hutson	3:57
9.	"Promise"	M. Hawke; Hutson	2:50
10.	"Chaos Angel"	M. Hawke; Hutson	4:36
Total length:			35:32

== Personnel ==
Musicians

- Maya Hawke – lead vocals
- Will Graefe – electric guitar (tracks 1–6, 10), vocals (1, 4, 5), acoustic guitar (2–4)
- Christian Lee Hutson – Mellotron (tracks 1, 2, 8–10), electric guitar (1, 3, 5, 9), vocals (1, 5, 9, 10), acoustic guitar (2, 5, 6, 8, 9), piano (3, 4, 6, 8, 10); bass, drums, slide guitar (6); organ (9)
- Benjamin Lazar Davis – synthesizer (tracks 1, 8), bass (2, 3, 5, 8, 10), vocals (2, 5), drums (2), double bass (10)
- Eliza Lamb – vocals (tracks 1, 2)
- Michael Riddleberger – drums (1, 3, 4)
- Levon Hawke – vocals (track 1)
- Fiona Agger – vocals (track 1)
- Sadie Sink – vocals (track 1)
- Jesse Harris – vocals (track 1)
- Shahzad Ismaily – synthesizer (track 3), bass (4)
- Chris Votek – cello (tracks 5, 10)
- Zach Dellinger – viola, violin (tracks 5, 10)
- Luanne Homzy – viola, violin (tracks 5, 10)
- Paul Cartwright – viola, violin (tracks 5, 10)
- Jonathan Low – percussion (track 6)
- Marshall Vore – drums (track 8)

Technical

- Christian Lee Hutson – production
- Greg Calbi – mastering
- Steve Fallone – mastering
- Jonathan Low – mixing
