= Nightmares of Nature =

Netflix natural history docuseries with horror-style storytelling

- Promotional poster
- Genre: Nature documentary, Horror
- Narrated by: Maya Hawke
- Country of origin: United States
- Original language: English
- No. of seasons: 2
- No. of episodes: 6

Production
- Executive producers: Jason Blum; Chris McCumber; Gretchen Palek; Grant Mansfield; Alan Eyres; Tom Hugh-Jones; Martha Holmes
- Running time: 39–48 minutes
- Production companies: Blumhouse Television; Plimsoll Productions

Original release
- Network: Netflix
- Release: September 30 – October 28, 2025

Nightmares of Nature is an American natural history docuseries produced for Netflix. Narrated by Maya Hawke, the program presents animal survival stories through stylistic conventions associated with horror cinema. The series was developed by Blumhouse Television in collaboration with Plimsoll Productions and premiered in 2025. Two seasons have been released on Netflix.

== Premise ==
Nightmares of Nature depicts wildlife encounters from the perspective of prey animals. The series frames predation and environmental threats through suspense‑oriented storytelling while retaining an educational foundation. Each season contains three episodes set within a single habitat, following several animal subjects as they interact with predators, hazards, and human activity. A disclaimer preceding each episode notes that certain scenes are dramatized for safety and narrative clarity, while emphasizing that the behaviors shown are based on natural activity.

== Production ==
The series was produced through a collaboration between Blumhouse Television, noted for its horror films, and Plimsoll Productions, a natural history company. Producers described the concept as applying horror techniques—including suspenseful pacing, point‑of‑view camerawork, and atmospheric sound design—to footage of animal behavior. Cinematography employed macro lenses, motion‑controlled systems, and portable lighting to capture detailed images of small animals in controlled settings. Season one was directed by Nathan Small and season two by Charlotte Lathane, with filming conducted under professional wildlife supervision. Narration by Maya Hawke was recorded separately and added during post‑production.

== Seasons ==
=== Season 1: Cabin in the Woods ===
The first season, subtitled Cabin in the Woods, premiered on September 30, 2025. Set in a rural woodland environment, it follows a pregnant mouse, a young raccoon, and a bullfroglet that seek shelter in a dilapidated cabin. The location is portrayed as a deceptive refuge filled with predators and human-related dangers.

=== Season 2: Lost in the Jungle ===
The second season, Lost in the Jungle, was released on October 28, 2025. Set in a Costa Rican jungle, the season follows a young opossum, a newly hatched iguana, and a jumping spider navigating an abandoned research facility.

== Episodes ==
=== Series overview ===
Season	Subtitle	Episodes	Originally released
1	Cabin in the Woods	3	September 30, 2025
2	Lost in the Jungle	3	October 28, 2025

=== Season 1: Cabin in the Woods (2025) ===
No. overall	No. in season	Title	Original release date	Length
1	1	"Chapter One: Escaping the Woods"	September 30, 2025	44 minutes
2	2	"Chapter Two: The Cabin"	September 30, 2025	44 minutes
3	3	"Chapter Three: Get Out"	September 30, 2025	48 minutes

=== Season 2: Lost in the Jungle (2025) ===
No. overall	No. in season	Title	Original release date	Length
4	1	"Chapter One: Welcome to the Jungle"	October 28, 2025	41 minutes
5	2	"Chapter Two: Trapped"	October 28, 2025	39 minutes
6	3	"Chapter Three: A Dead End"	October 28, 2025	40 minutes

== Release ==
Netflix released an official trailer for Nightmares of Nature in September 2025. The series premiered later that fall, with both seasons debuting in the same year. The release of the second season was scheduled to coincide with Halloween programming.

== Reception ==
=== Critical response ===
==== Season 1: Cabin in the Woods ====
Reviews for the first season noted the series' genre-mash approach, combining natural-history footage with horror-style framing and pacing. Bloody Disgusting described the concept as an unconventional but effective "edutainment" blend, praising the cinematography and the way the season structures wildlife encounters like set-pieces while still aiming to remain informative; the review also highlighted the production's upfront note that some sequences are dramatized while the animal behavior shown is natural. Writing for Ready Steady Cut, Jonathon Wilson argued that the overlap between nature-documentary storytelling and horror conventions makes the premise feel surprisingly organic, but suggested the season sometimes appears unsure how strongly to commit to either horror presentation or factual explanation, with narration used to bridge the two modes. Karina "ScreamQueen" Adelgaard of Heaven of Horror was more positive, characterising the season as a dark-fairytale-style survival narrative anchored by Maya Hawke's narration and focused on three "hero" animals moving through escalating threats.

==== Season 2: Lost in the Jungle ====
Bloody Disgusting called the season a more exciting and varied follow-up to the forest-based first season, arguing that the South American jungle environment and the "abandoned lab" location raise the stakes and allow for more varied hazards; the review also noted that Hawke's narration feels more assured and supportive of the visual storytelling than in the earlier episodes. Wilson, again writing for Ready Steady Cut, similarly framed the second season as "better" primarily because its tropical biome provides a broader range of threats, while keeping the same basic narrative structure (three focal animals whose paths intersect), and argued that the concept works more effectively when the environment itself supplies stronger natural tension.

==== Scientific and ethical commentary ====
The series prompted discussion among wildlife researchers and science commentators about the ethics of filming animals in constructed environments. Some biologists argued that such settings could cause stress or alter behavior for narrative purposes. Producers responded that filming was conducted under professional supervision and emphasized that no animals were harmed.
