= Nena von Schlebrügge =

Swedish and German fashion model (born 1941)

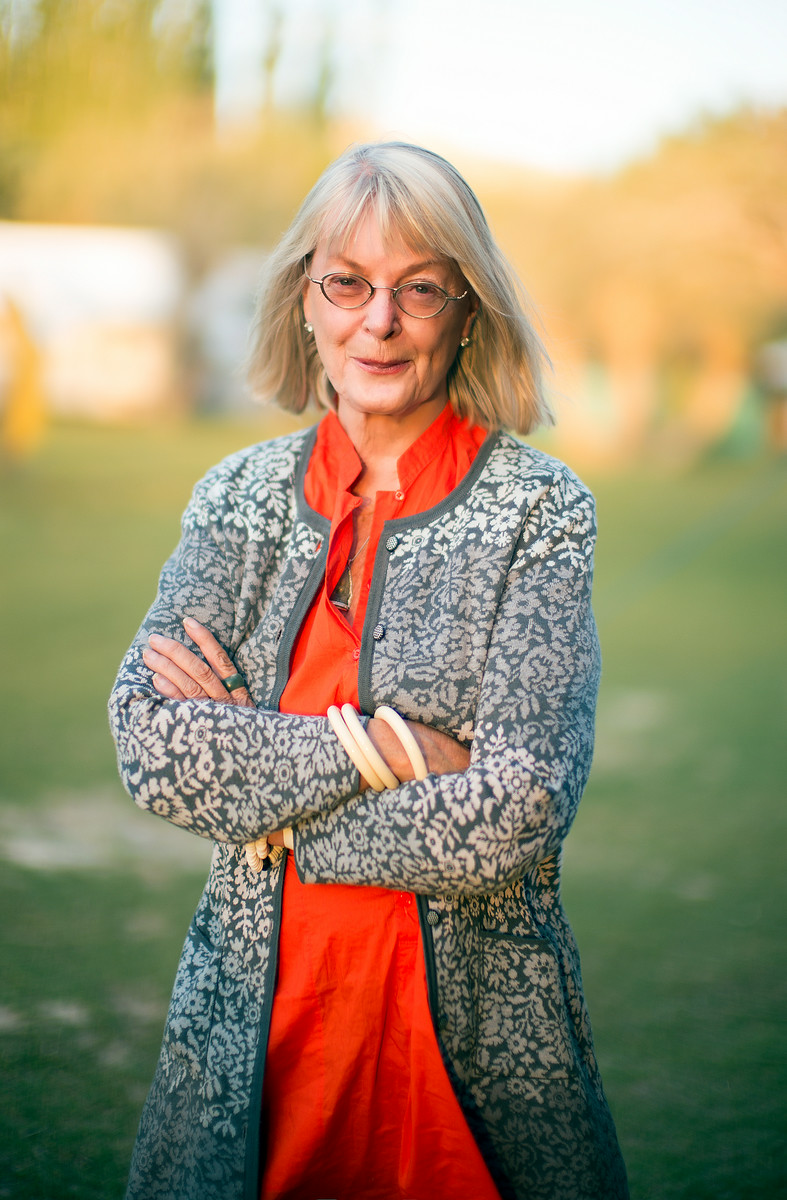
- Von Schlebrügge in 2014
- Born: Birgitte Caroline von Schlebrügge; January 8, 1941 (age 85); Mexico City, Mexico
- Occupation: Fashion model
- Spouses: Timothy Leary (m. 1964; div. 1965) Robert Thurman (m. 1967; died 2026)
- Children: 4, including Uma Thurman
- Relatives: Maya Hawke (granddaughter); Levon Hawke (grandson)

Birgitte Caroline "Nena" von Schlebrügge (born January 8, 1941) is a Swedish-German fashion model who achieved prominence in the late 1950s and 1960s and later became a psychotherapist. She began her high-fashion modeling career in London in 1957 and was later signed by the Ford Modeling Agency in New York City in 1958, where she appeared in editorial and runway work for major fashion publications including Vogue and Harper's Bazaar.

She was briefly married to Timothy Leary from 1964 to 1965. After her marriage to Buddhist scholar Robert Thurman in 1967, she became known professionally and socially as Nena Thurman. The actress Uma Thurman is their daughter.

After her modeling career, von Schlebrügge trained in psychotherapy. She later served as managing director of Tibet House US. As of 2018, she is the executive chairwoman of the Menla Retreat and Health Spa in upstate New York.

== Family ==
Born a member of the Schlebrügge family, once part of the German nobility, Nena's father was German officer Friedrich Karl Johannes von Schlebrügge. Her Swedish mother Birgit Holmquist served as Axel Ebbe's model for Famntaget ("The Embrace"), a 1930s statue of a nude woman that overlooks the harbor of Smygehuk in Sweden.

== Career ==
=== Modeling ===
In 1955, at the age of 14, Nena was discovered by Vogue photographer Norman Parkinson when he was on a tour in Stockholm, Sweden. In 1957, Nena moved to London, United Kingdom, to pursue a career in high-fashion modeling. She found immediate success and was invited to come to New York City by Eileen Ford of the Ford Modeling Agency to continue her modelling career.

In the snow storm of March 1958, at the age of 17, she arrived in New York City on the Queen Mary. In New York City, she continued her career as a top model, working at Vogue and Harper's Bazaar. She was photographed by many fashion photographers, including Gleb Derujinsky.

=== Acting ===
She was cast in the 1967 Edie Sedgwick film Ciao! Manhattan, although her scenes were not included in the released version; her footage appears as deleted material on some home video editions.

=== Open Center and Tibet House ===
From 1987 to 1989, Nena was the Program Director at the New York Open Center. From 1991 to 2002 she served as the Managing Director of Tibet House US in New York City. Tibet House US was founded in 1986 by the Thurmans, Philip Glass, and Richard Gere, at the behest of the Dalai Lama. Nena oversaw the construction of Tibet House US and the educational programming. With Philip Glass, she initiated the annual benefit concert at Carnegie Hall and the annual benefit auction at Christie's. She was executive producer of The First 30 Years of Tibet House U.S. film, directed by John Halpern.

Since 2001, Nena has been the Managing Director of the Tibet House US-owned Menla Mountain Retreat and is now the Executive Chairwoman, where she has overseen the construction of a state-of-the-art Tibetan medicinal spa facility and business in the Catskill Mountains in Phoenicia, New York. She is also a psychotherapist.

== Personal life ==
Nena married Timothy Leary in 1964 at the Hitchcock Estate (commonly known as "Millbrook"). D. A. Pennebaker documented the event in his 12-minute film You're Nobody Till Somebody Loves You. Charles Mingus played piano at the wedding ceremony. The marriage lasted a year before von Schlebrügge divorced Leary in 1965.

In 1967, she married Indo-Tibetan Buddhist scholar and ex-monk Robert Thurman, whom she had met at Millbrook. In the same year, Nena and Robert's first child, Ganden Thurman, was born. In 1970, Robert and Nena's second child, Uma Thurman, was born. They gave birth to two more sons: Dechen (b. 1973) and Mipam (b. 1978). The children grew up in Woodstock, New York in a house built by the Thurmans on nine acres of land purchased with Nena's inheritance. In addition to their four children, the pair have seven grandchildren, including actress Maya Hawke.
