= Gleb Derujinsky =

American photographer (1925–2011)

- Born: March 19, 1925; New York City, New York, U.S.
- Died: June 9, 2011 (aged 86); Durango, Colorado, U.S.
- Occupation: Photographer
- Website: http://www.glebderujinsky.com/

Gleb Derujinsky (March 19, 1925–June 9, 2011) was an American fashion photographer. He worked for Esquire, Look, Life, Glamour, Town and Country and The New York Times Magazine, before shooting extensively for Harper’s Bazaar. Eileen Ford, founder of Ford Models agency, described him as an “early visionary on a path that others were to follow”.

== Early life and education ==
Gleb Derujinsky was born in New York City in 1925, and named after his father Gleb W. Derujinsky, an anti-communist White emigre descended from the Russian nobility and a successful sculptor. The Derujinsky family served the House of Romanov since the reign of Peter the Great, and their relatives included the composer Nikolai Rimsky-Korsakov and the painter Mikhail Vrubel.

Derujinsky’s mother, the classical pianist Alexandra Micholoff Derujinsky, died in the late 1950s.

Derujinsky’s first languages were Russian and French, and he went on to learn English while enrolled at the Trinity School in New York.

In 1942, Derujinsky became a corporal in the army and stayed until after the end of World War II. His language abilities and negotiation skills contributed to his being promoted to Staff Sergeant halfway through his tours, and learned Morse Code in just 30 days.

== Career ==
Upon his return to New York City, he opened his first photography studio with his veteran loan. By February 1948, he landed his first cover with Collier’s magazine. Shortly thereafter, he began working for Harper’s Bazaar Jr., an offshoot of Harper’s Bazaar aimed towards college-age women that became a supplement to Harper’s Bazaar. Derujinsky was retained as a freelance photographer, working alongside Richard Avedon, Lillian Bassman, and Louise Dahl-Wolfe for editors Carmel Snow and Diana Vreeland and art director Alexey Brodovitch. Citing the great photographer Horst P. Horst as a key influence, Derujinsky photographed the Paris Spring collections from 1953 to 1963 and was known for his outlandish ideas and travel images taken in remote locations all over the world at the time when travel, especially by air, was far from common.

Derujinsky also freelanced for Look Magazine, Town and Country, The New York Times Magazine, Ladies’ Home Journal, Esquire, Glamour, Seventeen, Life, and Good Housekeeping.

Working extensively with Carmen Dell’Orefice and his then-wife Ruth Neumann-Derujinsky, his work also featured many of the era’s top models, from Jean Patchett and Jean Shrimpton, to Nena Von Schlebrügge and Iris Bianchi. In 1957, to commemorate the inauguration of Pan Am’s Boeing 707, Derujinsky, dubbed “the White Russian,” travelled around the world with Ruth Neumann and Nena Von Schlebrügge, photographing the former in 11 countries in the space of 28 days. His photographs of the Paris collections of the same year became a 25-page spread in Harper’s Bazaar.

In 1968, he began shooting television commercials for Union Carbide, Dolly Madison, Johnson & Johnson, Texas Instruments, and Revlon, going on to win several awards at Cannes and Venice.

== Personal life and death ==
Derujinsky married four models in his lifetime and had Andrea Derujinsky with his third wife and cover girl Ruth Neumann. In 1972, a few years after his divorce from Ruth Neumann, he married Wallis Fairfax Gault with whom he remained for 42 years until their deaths in 2011 in a car accident in Durango, Colorado, where they had lived for nearly 30 years.

In Durango, Derujinsky opened a jewelry studio, One of a Kind, making and designing his own pieces. He turned his love of skiing into a career when he qualified as an instructor in nearby Purgatory and taught in the children’s division for over a decade. He earned an instructor’s license as a glider pilot and was instrumental in starting the Durango Soaring Club at La Plata Airport, now known as Animas Air Park. He flew sailplanes in cross-country competitions, and in the late sixties and early seventies, he was one of the top ten sailplane pilots in the country. His achievements later in life include building a carbon fiber bicycle, whose patented design was one of the first to be used in an air tunnel test, as well as being used in the 1984 Olympic trials in Los Angeles.

== Notable photographs ==
- Fragrant Harbor Hong Kong, 1957–1958
- The Jaipur Observatory, 1957–1958
- Ceylon Sails, 1957–1958

== Books ==
- Capturing Fashion: Derujinsky, Photographs by Gleb Derujinsky, Text by Andrea Derujinsky, Foreword by Eileen Ford (Flammarion, 2016). Monograph.
- Model Woman: Eileen Ford and the Business of Beauty, Robert Lacey (Harper, 2015).
- Paris Mode: 100 photos de légende, Collectif (Parigramme, 2013).
- Paris Minuit, Collectif (Parigramme, 2013).
- Cecil Beaton: The Art of the Scrapbook, James Danziger (Assouline, 2013).
- Louis Vuitton Fashion Photography, Charlotte Cotton, Martin Harrison and Michel Mallard (Rizzoli, 2014).
- Valentina: American Couture and the Cult of Celebrity, Kohle Yohannan and Harold Koda (Rizzoli, 2009).
- Tiffany in Fashion, John Loring (Abrams, 2003).
- A Dash of Daring: Carmel Snow and Her Life in Fashion, Art, and Letters, Penelope Rowlands (Atria Books, 2008).
- Diana Vreeland: The Eye Has to Travel, Lisa Vreeland, Lally Weymouth, Judith Thurman, and Judith Clark (Abrams, 2011).
- 125 Great Moments of Harper’s Bazaar, Anthony T. Mazzola (Hearst Communications, 1993).
- Model Girl, Charles Castle (David & Charles, 1997).
- Alexey Brodovitch, Gabriel Bauret (Assouline, 2005).
- Harper’s Bazaar: Models, Derek Blasberg, Introduction by Glenda Bailey, Foreword by Karl Lagerfeld (Abrams, 2015).
- Diana Vreeland: The Modern Woman: The Bazaar Years, 1936–1962, Alexander Vreeland (Rizzoli, 2015).

== See also ==
- Gleb W. Derujinsky
