= Blush (Jeffree Star song) =

Single by Jeffree Star
- B-side: "Prisoner" (Morgan Page radio edit mix)
- Released: February 16, 2010
- Recorded: 2009
- Genre: Electronic
- Length: 3:44
- Label: Popsicle
- Songwriter(s): Jeffree Star

Jeffree Star singles chronology
| "Get Away with Murder" (2010) | "Blush" (2010) | "Beauty Killer" (2010) |

"Blush" is a song by American recording artist and songwriter Jeffree Star. It is a B-side track to the album Beauty Killer. The song itself was written by Jeffree Star, while the other song was written by Star and Luke Walker. "Blush" contains the new song "Blush" and a Morgan Page remix of "Prisoner", and the music video "Get Away with Murder", if bought on iTunes. It was released on February 16, 2010 as Star's fifth official single.

== Background ==
Star premiered the song in Manchester on March 14, 2009 during the I'm Pregnant, Let's Party Tour. During this time he was writing and recording songs for his first studio album, Beauty Killer. The song didn't make the album track list so Star premiered the full song on YouTube on February 13, 2010, stating that the song was just for fun and doesn't reflect the next album, which is set to be released sometime in 2012. A few days later, on February 16, 2010, the single was released at all online media outlets.

== Release and promotion ==
=== Artwork ===
The album cover photo was taken by photographer and film maker, Austin Young.

== Critical reception ==
Professional ratings
Review scores
| Source | Rating |
|---|---|
| Music Remedy | 2.5/5 stars |

The single received an average review from a critic.

== Track listing ==
Digital download

1. "Blush" – 3:44
2. "Prisoner" (Morgan Page radio edit mix) – 3:54

iTunes digital download

1. "Blush" – 3:44
2. "Prisoner" (Morgan Page radio edit mix) – 3:54
3. "Get Away with Murder" (music video) – 3:41

== Personnel ==
- Jeffree Star – vocals
