= Heather Blush =

Canadian jazz singer

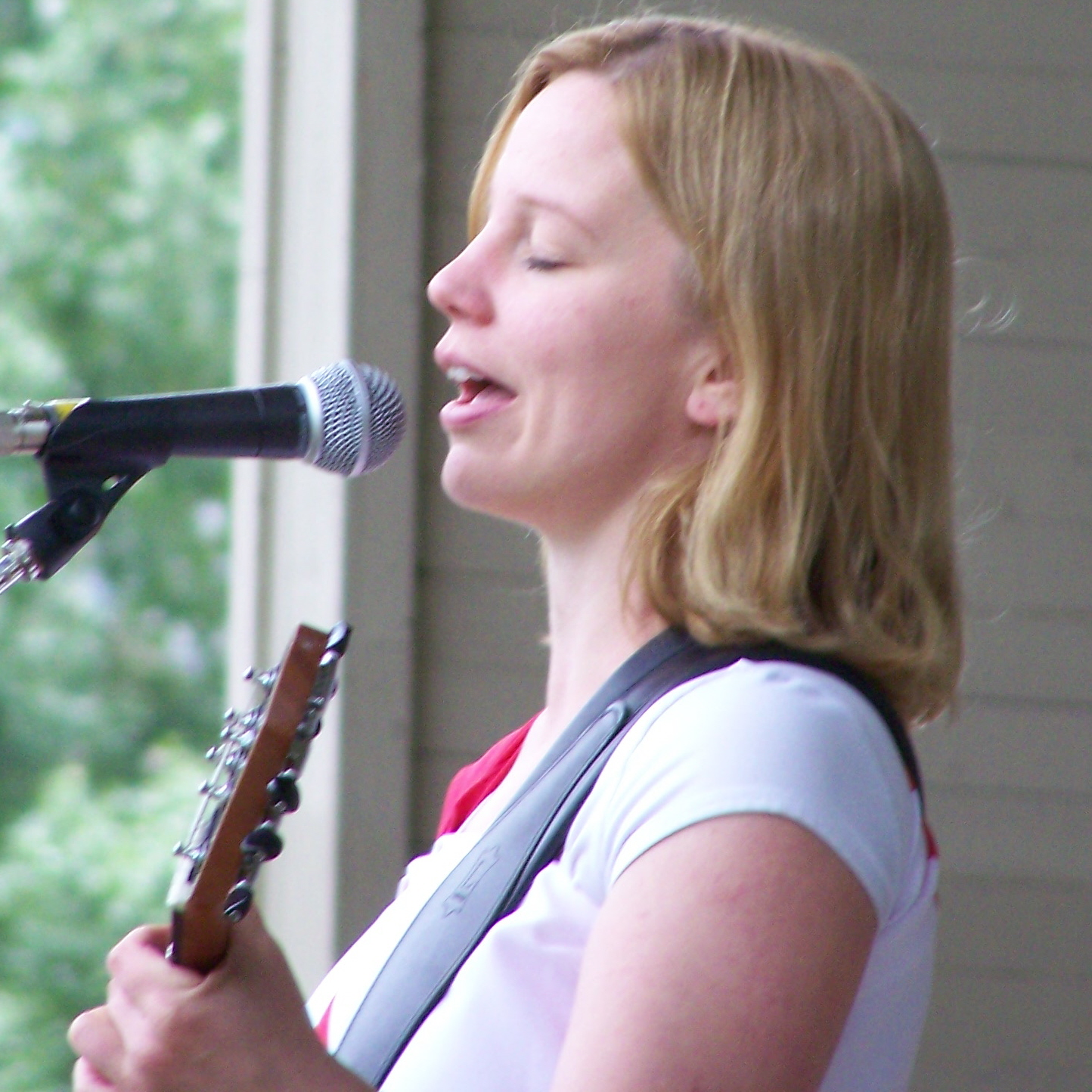
- Heather Blush performing on Canada Day 2007 at Prince's Island Park in Calgary, Alberta

Background information
- Born: Winnipeg, Manitoba, Canada
- Genres: Jazz
- Occupation: Singer
- Years active: 2005–present
- Labels: Stubborn Penguin
- Website: heatherblush.com

Heather Blush is a Canadian jazz singer. She performs with her band The Uppercuts, which includes Steve Hazlett (drums) and Dale Ulan (upright bass), under the name Heather Blush and the Uppercuts. In The Calgary Sun, her voice was described as a combination of Joni Mitchell and Norah Jones.

== Early life ==
Blush was born Heather Johnson She studied in Florida to become a music therapist.

== Musical career ==
She moved to Calgary, Alberta, where she recorded her first album in 2005 titled First Blush, with producer Dan Donahue in Winnipeg. She formed Heather Blush and Triple S, the name of her band before Stu Davies (lead guitarist) left the band in 2007. Shane Sutherland played double bass with The Uppercuts until 2010.

Her second album is Vice (2008), and her third album is Versa (2009, meant as part 2 of the Vice album).
