= Blush (Mexican band) =

Mexican pop rock band

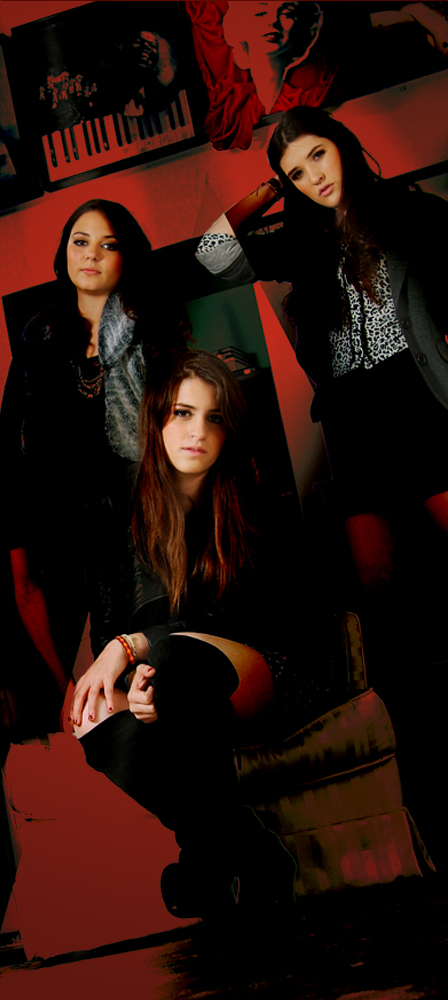

Background information
- Origin: Guadalajara, Mexico
- Genres: Pop rock, Latin rock
- Members: Ximena Calleros; Ale Di'Orio; Pao Reynoso; Lili Espinosa

Blush was a Mexican pop rock band from Guadalajara, Jalisco made up of 4 young women.

== History ==
Blush started as a disquietude of 4 young women from Guadalajara, Jalisco who wanted to create their own music. Ximena Calleros, Ale Di'Orio, Pao Reynoso and Tania Restelli started to play as a hobby but in a short lapse of time the band started to become more popular in their city, demanding them to take the project more formally.

The band started with Tania Restelli as their leading vocalist. At first they wrote their songs in English, that were translated into Spanish later on. Tania left the band because of personal issues, that is when Dany Ramirez entered replacing Tania as the singer. From that moment the band gained importance, they had several presentations and they composed more songs. That's how in a few months the band's fan list grew to thousands of followers, people who enjoyed the innovative concept of all-girl bands.

In 2010 Blush had several important presentations around Guadalajara. From concerts in bars like the Old Jack's Studio and the Boston's Whiskey Bar to big events of thousands of people. They recorded their first EP in OIGO Estudio with Arturo "Tuti" Perales as the sound engineer. This EP contains 3 songs: "No Es Asi", which is the single that was presented and continuously played in local radio stations, "Contigo y Sin Ti" and "Ven". Starting 2011, Dany Ramirez left the band.

== Members ==
- Ximena Duggan: Drums, Backup vocals
- Ale Di'Orio: Guitar
- Marriana: Bass
- Beatriz Davizon: Lead vocals

== Discography ==
- Blush – EP (2010)
