= Blush (Maya Hawke album) =

Studio album by Maya Hawke
- Released: August 21, 2020
- Genre: Folk rock
- Length: 38:16
- Label: Mom + Pop
- Producer: Jesse Harris

Maya Hawke chronology
Blush (2020)	Moss (2022)

Singles from Blush
- 1. "By Myself" Released: March 18, 2020; 2. "Coverage" Released: April 22, 2020; 3. "Generous Heart" Released: August 20, 2020

Blush is the debut studio album by American singer-songwriter and actress Maya Hawke. Initially set for June 19, 2020, the album release date was delayed to August 21, 2020. Blush was released independently via Mom + Pop Music. The album is a continuation of her collaboration with musician Jesse Harris, who produced and composed her solo debut with a double single set in August 2019.

== Background and release ==
Prior to the album's release, the actress made her musical debut in August 2019 when she released a double single-set with "To Love a Boy" and "Stay Open". The A-side and B-side singles were produced and composed by musician Jesse Harris, with Hawke as the lyricist. This record was released shortly after Hawke had gained popularity from her acting roles in both Stranger Things and Once Upon a Time in Hollywood.

Hawke announced the album and released its first single, "By Myself" in March 2020. The second single, "Coverage", was released in April 2020. The song's music video was directed by Maya's father Ethan Hawke. The album release date was delayed from June 19, 2020 to August 21, 2020 amid the 2020 Black Lives Matter protests. Hawke wrote, "I feel like this is not a time for self-promotion. It is a time for activation, education and self-examination." A day before the release of Blush, Hawke released the final single "Generous Heart" and its music video.

Hawke donated a portion of her merchandise sales to Food Bank For New York City.

== Composition and lyrics ==
Hawke told Pitchfork: "This album happened accidentally. From my point of view, Blush is a collection of secret messages, hidden communications with the people in my life." She told Nylon, "We [Harris and Hawke] kept writing, kept collecting songs because it brought joy into both of our lives. Collecting them into an album and releasing it comes from a crazy, if not pathological desire to share that joy with others." Essentially, the record is a reflection upon Hawke's childhood and early years.

Musically, Blush is performed in the genre of folk rock, with additional elements of country music. Critics noted that the "carefully paced drumming" and "accentual", "gentle", "delicate" guitars are primary "flavors" to the record.

== Critical reception ==
Professional ratings
Aggregate scores
Source	Rating
Metacritic	76/100
Review scores
Source	Rating
Beats Per Minute	7.1/10
The Forty-Five	3/5 stars
NME	4/5 stars
Pitchfork	6.8/10
Sputnikmusic	4/5 stars

Patrick Ryan of USA Today describes the record as "a 12-song collection of playful, evocative letters to her friends, family and lovers," and noted that the "intimately personal music is reminiscent of Hawke's songwriting heroes: Joni Mitchell, Fiona Apple and Taylor Swift." Rhian Daly of NME wrote that the album "shows the work of a songwriter who, even as something of a rookie, can command your attention and emotions with the most effortless of lines and make you consider your own life and relationships with the gentle encouragement of a close friend. Hold 'Blush' close – it’s a special one." Peyton Thomas of Pitchfork wrote, "The Stranger Things actor’s move into music is refreshingly thoughtful and understated, with emotionally incisive songwriting and a featherlight voice wrapped up in Laurel Canyon arrangements." Conor Lochrie of Beats Per Minute described Hawke's musical style as "cosy and unthreatening, feeling for its place in the world," and wrote that "Blush is, in its gentle and pleasant way, a strong debut collection of country and folk songs." Nicole Almedia of Atwood Magazine described the record as "an already classic-sounding body of work which, with its folk-inflected sounds and Hawke’s impressive lyricism, makes growing pains sound quite delightful." Sputnikmusic noted that "Blush has a quiet confidence in its stride," and that its "bare arrangements are a compliment to [Hawke's] voice, which is nimble enough to meander through all of the record’s introspective verses while also retaining enough power to deliver the occasional knock out chorus. [...] nothing here is meant to be flashy enough to detract from the words at hand."

== Track listing ==
Adapted from Apple Music:

All tracks are written by Maya Hawke and Jesse Harris.

Blush track listing
No.	Title	Length
1.	"Generous Heart"	3:35
2.	"So Long"	3:59
3.	"By Myself"	2:26
4.	"Animal Enough"	3:27
5.	"Coverage"	3:45
6.	"Hold the Sun"	2:59
7.	"River Like You"	2:16
8.	"Bringing Me Down"	2:35
9.	"Cricket"	3:10
10.	"Menace"	3:57
11.	"Goodbye Rocketship"	3:10
12.	"Mirth"	2:57
Total length:		38:16
