= Gleb W. Derujinsky =

Russian-American sculptor (1888–1975)

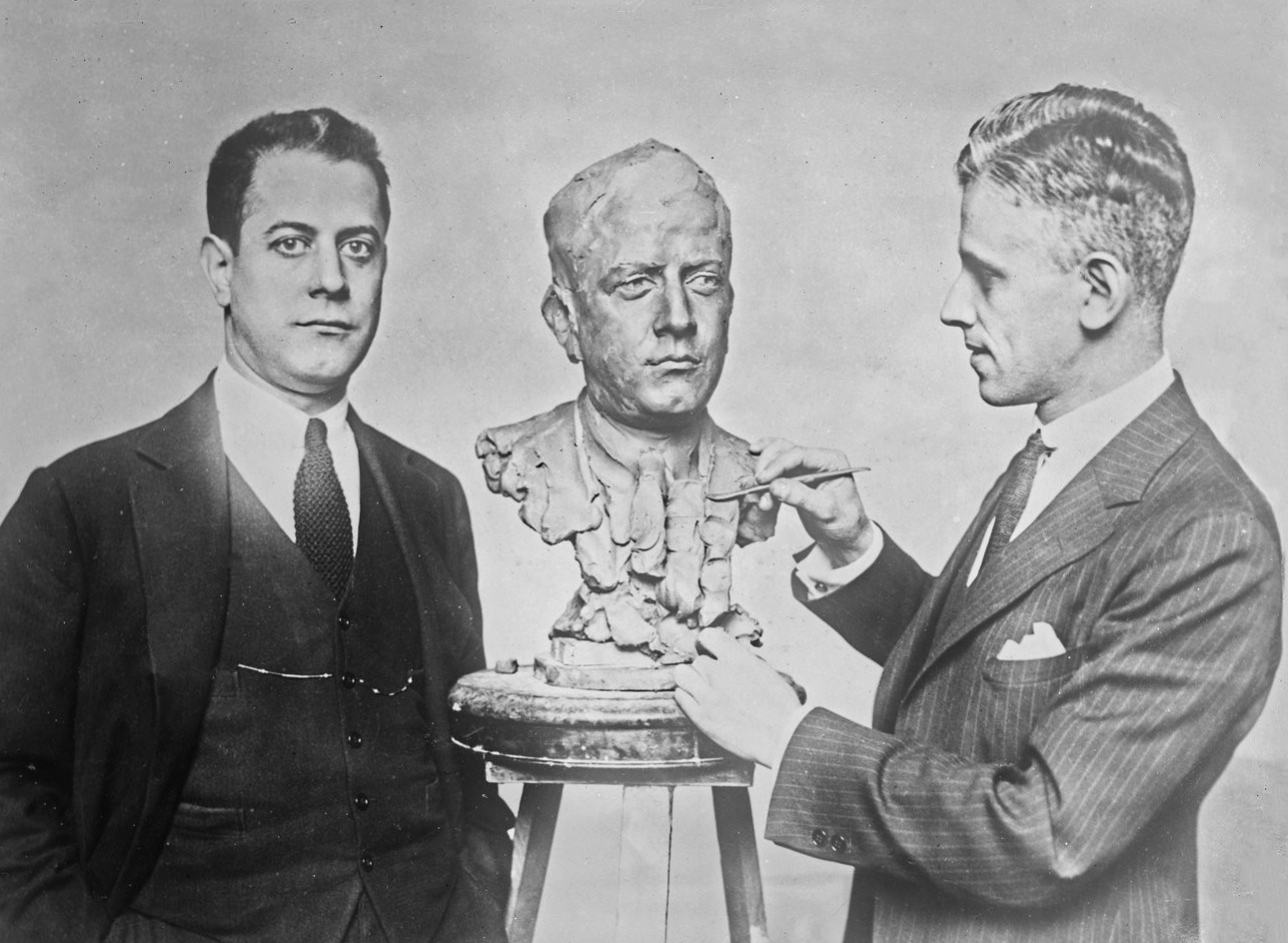
- José Raúl Capablanca and Derujinsky in 1922
- Born: August 13, 1888; Otradnoye, Smolensky Uyezd, Smolensk Governorate, Russian Empire
- Died: March 9, 1975 (aged 86); New York, United States
- Occupation: Sculptor

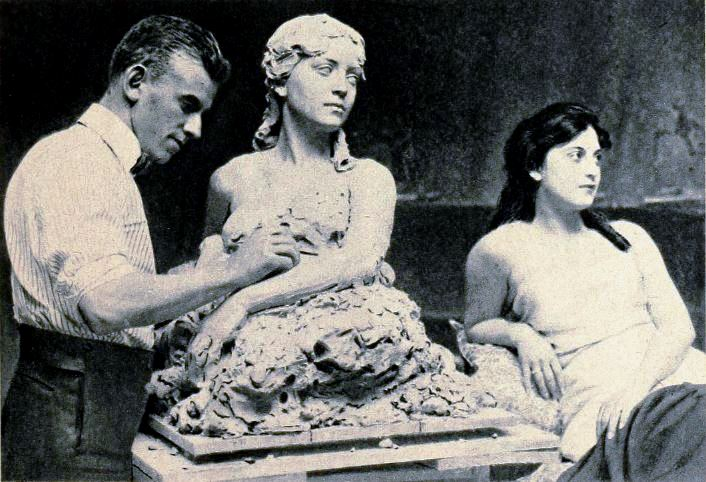
Derujinsky with his model Virginia Brown Faire in 1920

Gleb W. Derujinsky (Глеб Владимирович Дерюжинский; August 13, 1888 – March 9, 1975) was a Russian-American sculptor.

== Biography ==
Born in Otradnoye, in the Smolensky Uyezd of the Smolensk Governorate of the Russian Empire, he was related to Nikolai Rimsky-Korsakov on his father's side and the painter Mikhail Vrubel on his mother's. He completed his law degree at the University of Petrograd to meet his father's expectations, but devoted his entire life to sculpture.

His artistic studies began in the years 1896–1901 at the Drawing School of the Imperial Society for the Encouragement of the Arts in Saint Petersburg, his teacher being sculptor Giovanni Andreoletti, the talented pedagogue and professor at the Academy of Arts. Having finally decided in favour of art as his life-work, Derujinsky moved to Paris in 1912, where he continued his studies at the Académie Colarossi and at the Académie Julian, where he was befriended by Rodin.

He returned to Saint Petersburg in 1903 and continued his studies at the Imperial Academy of Arts, Sculpture department, where he received seven first prizes, the first to receive this distinction and was nominated for the Prix de Rome. He participated in the Academy exhibitions and those organized by the Society for the traveling art exhibitions (Peredvizhniki), and others. In 1918 he graduated from the Academy and emigrated to the United States in 1919.

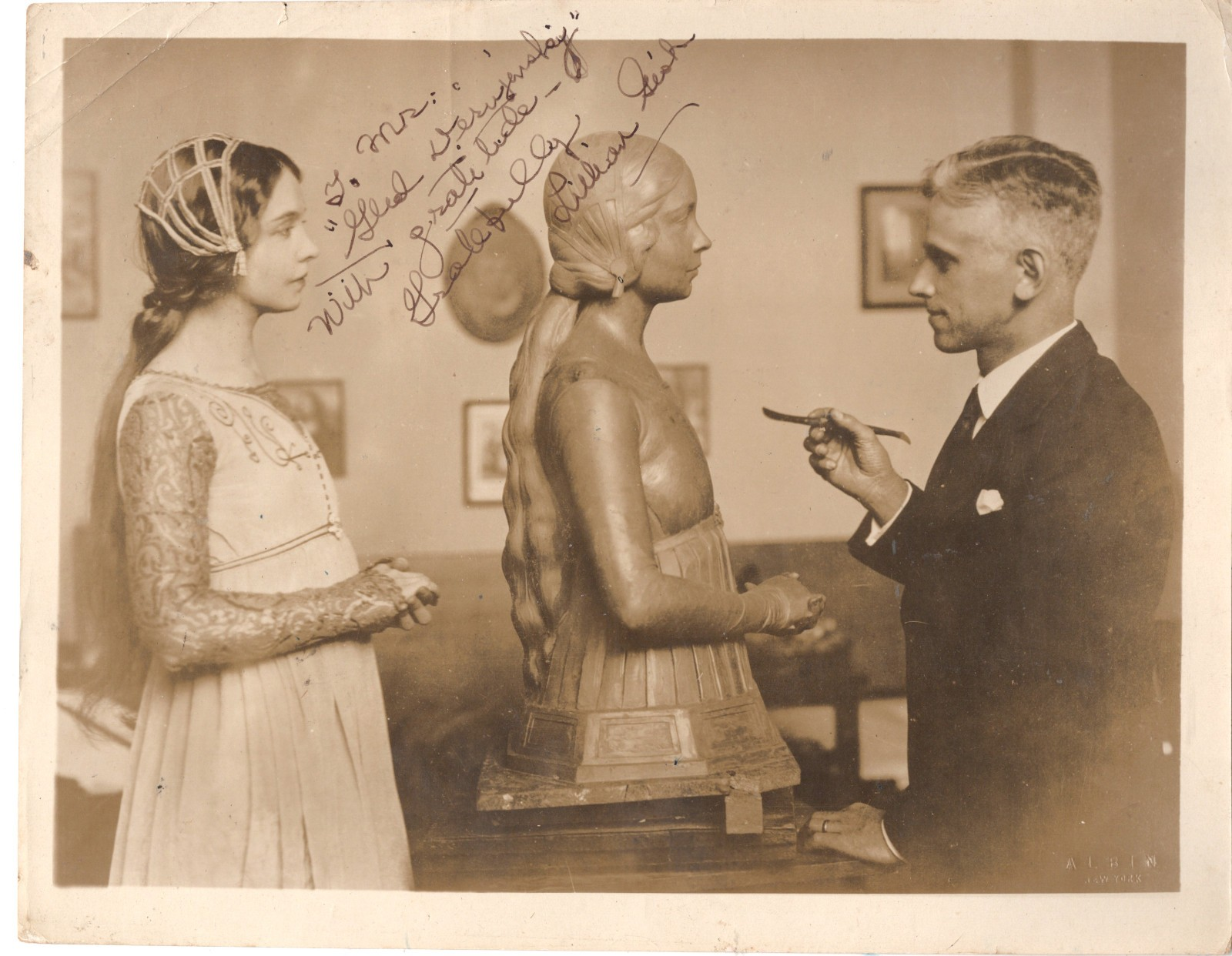
Lillian Gish Posing For Derujinsky

His original sculptures in plaster done from life include Theodore Roosevelt, Sergei Rachmaninoff, Sergei Prokofiev, Lillian Gish, Lady Diana Cooper, Rabindranath Tagore, Franklin D. Roosevelt, Adlai Stevenson, John F. Kennedy, José Raúl Capablanca and many others.

Derujinsky's works are in the permanent collections of major museums in the United States and Europe as well as many churches and public buildings. In 1925, he designed and patented the "Rearing Lion" hood ornament for the Franklin automobile. In 1933 he was elected into the National Academy of Design as an Associate member, and became a full Academician in 1953.

Derujinsky is credited with "The Letter" (1940) which is on display at the Logan Post Office in Logan in Logan County. The work was commissioned by the Treasury Section of Fine Arts as part of the New Deal.

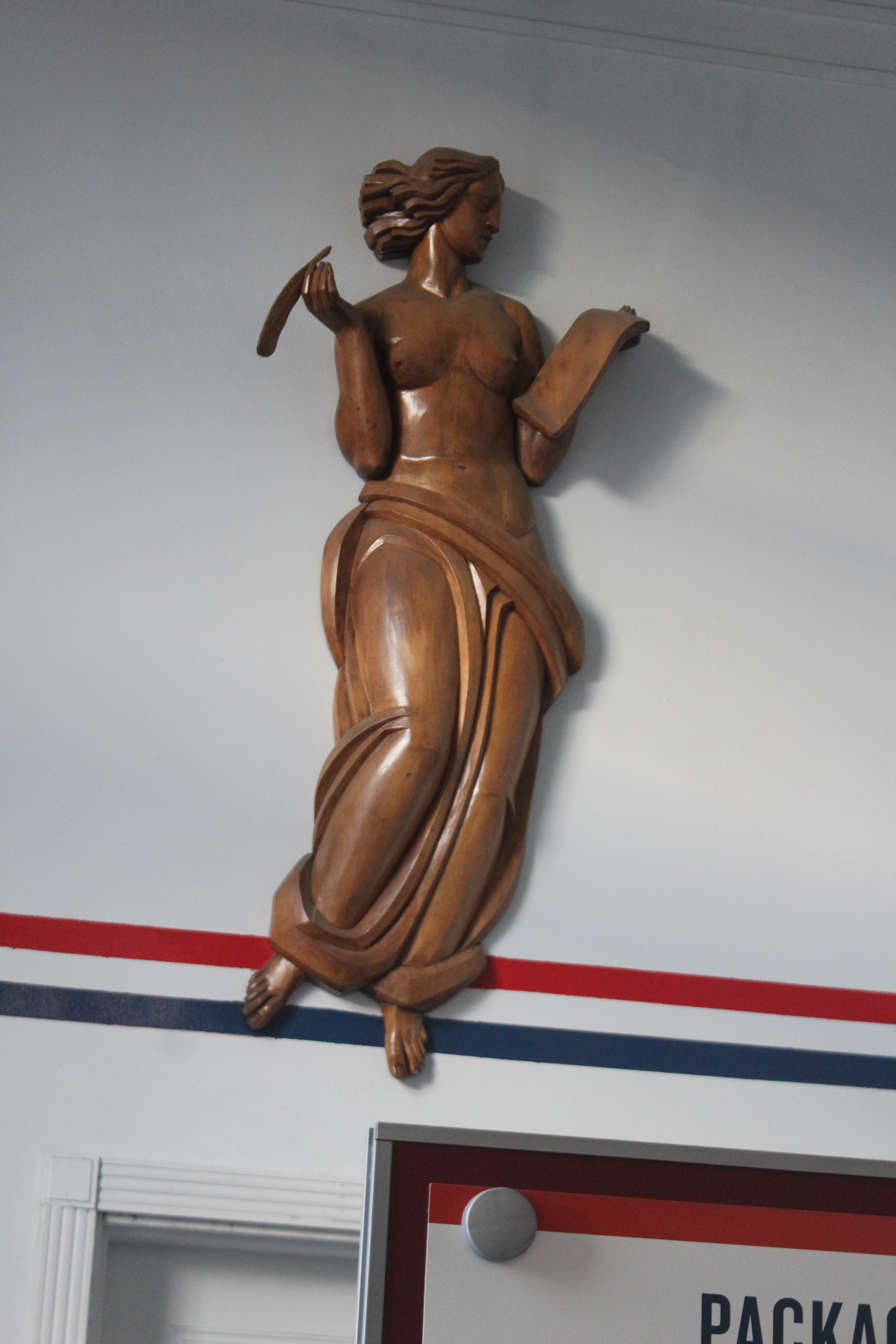
Derujinsky's "The Letter" Logan Post Office, Logan, West Virginia. Photographed 29 September 2018 by Ernest Everett Blevins, MFA

His son, Gleb Derujinsky (1925–2011), was one of the most in demand fashion photographers of his time.

He died on March 9, 1975, at the age of 86 in his New York home.

== See also ==
- Gleb Derujinsky
