= Blush (magazine) =

Canadian parenting magazine

- blush magazine #1, winter 2008
- Managing Editor: Gail Johnson
- Categories: Parenting
- Frequency: Biannual
- Publisher: Ryan Benn
- Founded: 2008
- Company: Teldon Publishing
- Country: Canada
- Based in: Richmond, British Columbia
- Language: English
- Website: blushmom.com

Blush (stylized as blush) is a Canadian magazine for urban mothers that focuses on pregnancy and the first three years of a child's life.

Blush features articles on topics such as prenatal tests, breastfeeding, postnatal fitness, nutritional supplements, and maternity clothing and fashion. The magazine promotes healthy living for moms, moms-to-be, and kids, all devoted to mommy's lifestyle. Stories on the hottest maternity clothes and lingerie, "getting your post-pregnancy body back," and "yoga for two" give readers the inside scoop.

Blush is distributed through retailers such as West Coast Kids, UC Baby and Please Mum, a national kids' clothing store with 91 locations in Canada. The magazine is also available at fertility clinics and hospitals across Canada. Blush is produced bi-annually by Teldon Publishing, a commercial printing company based in Richmond, British Columbia.

== Related services and publications ==
blushmom.com

The website for blush provides access to information about pregnancy and parenting. It features various categories for mothers, kids, pregnancy, fashion and beauty, health, fitness and food. blushmom.com also has exciting blog postings from experienced and new mothers, community discussion forums, new recipe ideas, and many contest giveaways.

Teldon Publishing Inc.

Teldon Publishing Inc. produces a wide range of publications, including natural health magazines and newsletters, as well as custom publishing. A major business division of Teldon is the alive Publishing Group, with operations in both Canada and Australia.
