= Levon Hawke =

American actor (born 2002)

- Hawke in 2024
- Born: Levon Roan Thurman-Hawke; January 15, 2002 (age 24)
- Education: Brown University (BA)
- Occupation: Actor
- Years active: 2020-Present
- Television: The Crowded Room
- Parents: Ethan Hawke (father); Uma Thurman (mother)
- Relatives: Maya Hawke (sister); Robert Thurman (maternal grandfather); Nena von Schlebrügge (maternal grandmother)

Levon Roan Thurman-Hawke (born January 15, 2002) is an American actor. He is the son of Ethan Hawke and Uma Thurman and younger brother of actress Maya Hawke.

== Early life ==
Hawke was born in 2002, the younger of two children born to actors Ethan Hawke and Uma Thurman. He was reportedly named after Levon Helm from the rock group The Band, a musical hero of his father. His parents met on the set of Gattaca (1997), married in May 1998, and divorced in 2005. Hawke has an older sister, Maya. He also has three half-sisters: two from his father and his father's second wife, Ryan Shawhughes, and one from his mother and her ex-fiancé, financier Arpad Busson. Through his mother, he has German and Swedish ancestry.

On his father's side, Hawke is a distant cousin of the playwright Tennessee Williams. On his mother's side, he is a grandson of Buddhist scholar Robert Thurman and model Nena von Schlebrügge. Schlebrügge's mother, Birgit Holmquist, was also a model, having posed for Axel Ebbe's statue Famntaget, installed in the harbour of Smygehuk in Sweden, in 1930.

Hawke attended Brown University, graduating with a degree in philosophy.

== Career ==
In 2020, Hawke was rumored to have joined the cast of Stranger Things. However, he was on-set to visit his sister Maya Hawke, but was dressed as an extra due to strict COVID-19 policies. Hawke has a role in the ensemble cast of Apple TV+ anthology series The Crowded Room alongside Tom Holland.

In July 2022, it was revealed he would make his feature film debut in the Zoë Kravitz directed Blink Twice. In March 2023, he was announced to be cast as Jack in the Peter Dinklage western project The Thicket. In September 2024, Hawke made his directorial debut with Picture Day, a play written by him and performed at Coffey Street Studios and produced by Quick & Dirty Theatre Company. In the 2025 Josh Safdie film Marty Supreme, he plays Christian, a man flimflammed by Marty Mauser.

Hawke has recently been cast in Hayley Kiyoko's film directorial debut Girls Like Girls, Molly Gordon's A24 comedy film Peaked, and the second season of Mr. & Mrs. Smith.

== Filmography ==
Key
†	Denotes works that have not yet been released

=== Film ===
Year	Title	Role	Notes
2023	Wildcat	Convict	
2024	Blink Twice	Lucas	
2024	The Thicket	Jack	
2025	Marty Supreme	Christian	
2026	Girls Like Girls	Trenton	
TBA	Peaked †		Filming

=== Television ===
Year	Title	Role	Notes	Ref.
2023	The Crowded Room	Johnny	Recurring role	
TBA	Mr. & Mrs. Smith †		Filming	

=== Music video ===
Year	Title	Artist
2022	Thérèse	Maya Hawke
