= List of Monsters, Inc. characters =

This is a list of characters from the Disney/Pixar media franchise Monsters, Inc., including the 2001 film Monsters, Inc., the 2013 film Monsters University, and the 2021 Disney+ series Monsters at Work.

== Appearing in both films ==
=== James P. Sullivan ===
James P. Sullivan
- Monsters, Inc. character
- First appearance: Monsters, Inc. (2001)
- Created by: Pete Docter; Jill Culton; Jeff Pidgeon; Ralph Eggleston
- Voiced by: John Goodman (films, Monsters at Work, Monsters, Inc. Scream Arena, Lego The Incredibles, Disney Dreamlight Valley); Brian Cummings (Monsters, Inc. PlayStation 2 video game, Monsters, Inc. Scream Team, Monsters, Inc. Wreck Room Arcade); Joel McCrary (Disney Infinity); Christopher Swindle (Kingdom Hearts III and Disney Speedstorm)

In-universe information
- Full name: James Patrick Sullivan
- Nickname: Sulley
- Species: Unnamed monster
- Gender: Male
- Occupation: Scarer (Monsters, Inc., excluding epilogue); Chief executive officer of Monsters, Incorporated (Monsters at Work onward, including the epilogue of Monsters, Inc.)
- Family: Bill Sullivan (father); Mrs. Sullivan (mother)

James Patrick "Sulley" Sullivan is a furry, cyan-and-purple-spotted monster with a humanoid bear face, short devilish horns, dark blue eyebrows, and a cat-like nose. He has muscular limbs, a reptilian tail, dorsal spikes, and feline fangs, and is capable of ferocious roaring. He excels at scaring children but is genial and sweet-natured.

In Monsters, Inc., he is named the best scarer at the company, and following the events of the film, he leads the company's restructuring of utilizing laughs instead of screams to harvest energy. By the end of the film, he and Mike are named the company's joint chief executive officers.

Monsters University depicts a younger Sulley as a gifted but arrogant student, whose father Bill had made a name for himself as a scarer. While attempting to capture a school pet, he meets Mike Wazowski. What begins as a rivalry between the two monsters becomes a friendship that endures after they both got disgracefully expelled from the school.

In Monsters at Work, he retains the title as CEO of the company.

=== Mike Wazowski ===
Mike Wazowski (voiced by Billy Crystal in the film series, shorts, and the Disney+ series, Carlos Alazraqui in the video games, merchandise, attractions, and commercials and Noah Johnston as his younger self) is a green one-eyed monster with a round body, two small horns, and thin arms. He has four fingers on each hand and three toes on each foot. Wazowski is depicted as diligent and intelligent, but also competitive, wise-cracking and stubborn.

During a childhood field trip to the energy company Monsters, Inc., Mike becomes inspired to become a professional scarer. He gets accepted into the Monsters University scare program years later, where he meets both James P. "Sulley" Sullivan and Randall "Randy" Boggs. Mike grows jealousy towards Sulley for his cocky personality and slacker attitude, but expresses a liking for Randall, his roommate. After failing one of the classes in the scaring program, Mike works out a deal with the Dean to re-enroll in the program on the stipulation that he wins the Scare Games, a competitive series of scare-based challenges. To participate, he joins the unpopular fraternity Oozma Kappa, which is later joined by Sulley, who also failed the class. Mike and Sulley begin to form a friendship as they compete in the games. During the final event, Sulley cheats on Mike's behalf. Frustrated with Sulley's lack of faith in him, Mike breaks into a door-lab to enter the human world in an attempt to find out if human children find him scary, which they do not.

Although Sulley rescues him, the incident results in both Sulley and Mike's expulsion from the school. The two apply as workers in the Monsters, Inc. mailroom. They advance through the ranks until Sulley becomes a scarer with Mike as his assistant.

In Monsters, Inc., Sulley and Mike operate a station on the titular factory's Scare Floor, where they successfully generate energy with Sulley's scaring ability. Mike is in a romantic relationship with Celia Mae at this time. Throughout the film, Mike helps Sulley in his newfound mission to rescue Boo, a human child who sneaks into the factory.

While Sulley bonds with Boo, Mike is initially more inclined to find any means of getting rid of her. Meanwhile, Randall, who is no longer on good terms with either of them, is concocting a plot to generate more energy using the Scream Extractor, a machine that requires the kidnapping of human children. Amidst the chaos resulting from Boo's unknown presence, he discovers that Mike knows information about her, and they both agree to return her to a designated location. Upon arriving there, mentioning Randall's involvement makes Sulley hesitant, and while trying to disprove his suspicion, Mike gets abducted by Randall and uncover of his plan. Following several further plot events, Sulley and Mike successfully return Boo home, expel Randall to the human world, and prove the orchestration of the scheme by Mr. Waternoose, the company's CEO, to Child Detection Agency (CDA) Agents.

Mike is portrayed as a comedian in Tomorrowland at the Magic Kingdom in Walt Disney World Resort attraction, Monsters, Inc. Laugh Floor. He has made cameo appearances in other Pixar films, such as Finding Nemo (2003) and Cars (2006).

By the events of Monsters at Work, he is serving as Monsters, Inc's co-CEO, and educates monsters on how to improve their humor.

=== Randall Boggs ===
Randall Boggs
- Monsters, Inc. character
- First appearance: Monsters, Inc. (2001)
- Created by: Pete Docter; Jill Culton; Jeff Pidgeon; Ralph Eggleston
- Voiced by: Steve Buscemi (films, first film's video game tie-ins, Monsters at Work, Monsters, Inc. Scream Team, Monsters, Inc. Scream Arena, Monsters, Inc. Wreck Room Arcade); Peter Kelamis (Disney Infinity); J. P. Manoux (Kingdom Hearts III); Piotr Michael (Disney Speedstorm)

In-universe information
- Nickname: Randy (Monsters University)
- Species: Unnamed monster
- Gender: Male
- Occupation: Scarer (Monsters, Inc.; formerly); Second-in-command at FearCo (Monsters at Work, formerly); Escaped convict (Monsters at Work)

Randall Boggs is a purple, eight-legged, reptilian monster who can change his skin color to blend in with his surroundings. He is Sulley's arch-rival and Mike's nemesis and former close friend.

In the prequel Monsters University, Randall enrolls at the same time as Mike and the two end up as friends and roommates. He is neurotic and timid at first, having difficulty controlling his camouflage abilities, but is a model bookworm. When Randall is accepted into Roar Omega Roar, the top fraternity in the university, he quickly abandons Mike in order to retain his standing with the fraternity. He becomes more confident, determined, and vicious. After an embarrassing loss to Sulley at the Scare Games, a furious Randall vows he will never be beaten by Sulley again.

In Monsters, Inc., he vies for the position as the area's top scream collector, a competition set up to encourage working. Randall and his assistant Jeff Fungus collaborate with Waternoose to save the company by kidnapping human children to solve the crisis and allow Randall to rise to a higher position, but also secretly planning to betray Waternoose and take over the company. Sometime after Randall had finished building the Scream Extractor, Randall leaves a door activated on the Scare Floor, and a human child (later named Boo) wanders out. After discovering that she is in the factory and learning that Sulley and Mike were involved, he makes a deal with Mike: he will bring Boo's door to his station during lunch, where they will be able to return Boo, but he secretly hides in Boo's room waiting to capture her. When a suspicious Sulley refuses to trust Randall's plan, Mike goes into the room instead to prove Sulley wrong, leading Randall to abduct Mike by mistake. He nevertheless decides to use Mike as a test subject for the machine, but Sulley rescues him and Fungus is put in front of the machine instead and is disfigured as a result. He is soon revealed to have Waternoose as his partner, who banishes Sulley and Mike to the Himalayas to ensure that they cannot interfere with their plan and expose it to the public. Before Randall could extract the scream from Boo, Sulley returns and destroys the machine (using it to pin Waternoose, Randall, and Fungus to the wall, but Randall was quick enough to dodge it), thus saving Boo. Randall attempts to stop Sulley's escape but is heroically thwarted by Mike. After a long chase through the doors in the factory's door storage facility, Boo eventually conquers her fear of Randall and stops him from pushing Sulley out of an open door, buying Sulley enough time to overpower him. Afterward, Randall is forcibly exiled to the human world and winds up in a mobile home where the inhabitants beat him senseless, thinking he is an alligator. Sulley and Mike then destroy the door to prevent Randall's return. Later, Waternoose is exposed and arrested for his crimes, while Fungus learns from his mistakes and forms a working relationship with Mike and Sulley.

In Kingdom Hearts III, which takes place sometime after the film, Vanitas repairs Randall's door, which allowed him to return. He plans on harnessing negative energy to have kids become permanently sad. After he creates an Unversed monster with the help of Vanitas, he hopes to bring down Sulley and Mike and take over as CEO of Monsters, Inc. a defeated Randall forced back through his door in disgrace, followed by Sora locking the door, causing it to disappear.

In Monsters at Work, it is revealed that Johnny Worthington from FearCo rescued Randall from the swamp and hired him as an inside man to sabotage Monsters, Inc. to make laugh power seem unreliable and have Monstropolis run on fear power forever. Randall was also the one responsible for framing Tylor for the missing items and vandalism. He attempts to stop MIFT from extracting the screams from FearCo's fake scream amplifier and gets close to it by destroying the plug, but his tail gets caught in the socket, powering up the extractor and saving Monstropolis. He and Johnny are arrested for their cover-up, but Randall escapes from his cell using his camouflage.

=== Roz ===
Roz (voiced by Bob Peterson) is a snail-like monster who is the key master and administrator of Scare Floor F. Near the end of the film, she is revealed to be Number One of the CDA Agents, having been on an undercover assignment to investigate the company and expose Randall and Waternoose's scheme. She appears briefly near the end of the prequel as a member of the CDA Agents squad that responds to the break-in at the Door Lab, although she wears a full-body protective suit that covers her face. She reappears in the first episode of Monsters at Work, informing Mike and Sulley that the board of directors were putting them in charge of Monsters, Inc. and that her old undercover job was being given to her sister Roze. It is revealed in the season finale that she also works for the Monstropolis Energy Regulatory Commission.

=== CDA Agents ===
CDA Agents are an assortment of different monsters in hazmat suits (variously voiced by Rodger Bumpass, Pete Docter, Bill Farmer, Teddy Newton, David Silverman, and Lee Unkrich) whose main job is to respond to any reported incidents of contact between monsters and children or their belongings, since it is believed that human objects are toxic. They isolate and destroy any items accidentally brought back into the monster world. Any monsters that come in contact with a human object are quickly and forcibly decontaminated and get a neck cone applied afterwards. They also appear to have law enforcement powers, as they arrest CEO Henry J. Waternoose III after his plot to kidnap children to forcibly extract their screams is uncovered.

=== Yeti ===
The Yeti (voiced by John Ratzenberger) is a white-furred monster from Monstropolis who got banished to the Himalayas in the human world. He is a friendly monster and an expert at making snow cones. The Abominable Snowman greets Sulley and Mike when Mr. Waternoose banish them to the Himalayas. While the Abominable Snowman tries to make Sulley and Mike feel at home in his abode, he understands Sulley must rescue Boo, and tells him of a Nepalese village at the foot of the mountain where they can regain access to the monster world. Despite everything, the Abominable Snowman seems to have made the most of his fate and genuinely seems to enjoy the human world.

In the end credits in Cars (2006), the Abominable Snowplow, based on him, makes a cameo appearance.

In Monsters University, he was shown to have worked as a mailroom supervisor at Monsters, Inc. He warns Mike and Sulley not to tamper with the mail which is a crime punishable by banishment.

In Monsters at Work, it is revealed that he was banished by Mr. Waternoose after stumbling across a letter detailing the Scream Extractor plot. Due to this Sulley invites him back to Monsters, Inc., and he agrees. Once that was done, the Abominable Snowman happily works as a snow cone salesman at Monsters, Inc. under the new name of Adorable.

== Appearing in Monsters, Inc. ==
=== Boo ===
Boo (voiced by Mary Gibbs) is a three-year-old human girl who encounters Sulley and Mike after inadvertently entering the world of monsters. Boo is initially believed to be toxic to the monsters, but Sulley and Mike quickly learn otherwise. After learning of Boo's presence, Randall tries to kidnap Boo by making a deal with Mike, but due to Sulley and Boo not trusting Randall's motive, he kidnaps Mike by mistake; Sulley later rescues him. Boo may not be afraid of Sulley, but when she was brought into the training room (which is a simulator where scare recruits do their training) after Mike and Sulley escaped from Randall, she ended up frightened by Sulley's roar. When Mike and Sulley tried to return Boo to her home, Waternoose had Mike and Sulley exiled to the Himalayas to keep them from causing further interference with his malevolent plan. Sulley returns to the factory and rescues Boo from Randall's Scream Extractor (a large machine that is capable of extracting and collecting a child's scream), destroying the machine in the process. During the chase through the large storage vault, Boo's laughter ends up causing all the doors to operate. Eventually, Boo gets over being afraid of Randall and helps to defeat him. Sulley and Mike are able to access Boo's door, but Waternoose and the CDA Agents send it back to the Scare Floor. Mike distracts the CDA Agents carrying what they think is Boo, while Sulley escapes with Boo and her door, although Mr. Waternoose follows after they accidentally get his attention. Waternoose is arrested after his plot is exposed; the CDA Agents's undercover leader is revealed to be Roz, and she allows Sulley and Mike five minutes to return Boo to her world. Once Sulley and Mike have returned Boo to her room, her door is put through the shredder to ensure her safety. Boo tries to see Sulley again, but only finds her ordinary closet behind her door. Sometime later, Mike rebuilds Boo's door, allowing Sulley to reunite with her.

=== Monsters, Inc. employees ===
==== Henry J. Waternoose III ====
Henry J. Waternoose III (voiced by James Coburn) is a spider-like monster with five eyes, seven claws on each hand, six crab-like legs, who wears a business suit. He is the former company president and the CEO of Monsters, Inc. The company has been in Waternoose's family for three generations as he had inherited the company from his father at the age of 142. Amidst an energy crisis, Waternoose plans to save the company by kidnapping human children to extract their screams with Randall's help. At this point, Waternoose exiles Sulley and Mike to the Himalayas to keep them from interfering with his plan any further, though he later regrets it since they were his top employees. Sulley and Mike manage to escape the human world and trick Waternoose into exposing his plan to the CDA agents, resulting in his arrest. Sulley is appointed as Waternoose's successor.

In Monsters University, Waternoose makes a cameo on an image where he shakes hands with Sulley and Mike, who are being promoted as scare team members. Waternoose also cameos in the first episode of Monsters at Work, where his image appears during the outdated orientation video. The Xenon processor, a CPU used in the Xbox 360, was codenamed "Waternoose" after the character.

In Monsters at Work, the arrest of Waternoose was mentioned frequently. By the end of the second season, it is stated that Johnny Worthington had been imprisoned with Waternoose.

==== Celia Mae ====
Celia Mae
- Monsters, Inc. character
- First appearance: Monsters, Inc. (2001)
- Created by: Pete Docter
- Voiced by: Jennifer Tilly (Monsters, Inc., Monsters at Work season one, video games before 2023); Roxana Ortega (Disney Speedstorm and Monsters at Work season two)

In-universe information
- Nickname: Schmoopsie-poo (by Mike Wazowski)
- Species: Unnamed monster
- Gender: Female
- Occupation: Receptionist (Monsters, Inc., except for epilogue); Floor supervisor (Monsters at Work, including the Monsters, Inc. epilogue)

Celia Mae is a pink cyclops gorgon-like monster with purple snakes for hair, tentacles for legs, who wears a slick sleeveless green dress, with a gill-print design and a blueish green furry collar. She works as a receptionist at Monsters, Inc. and is Mike Wazowski's girlfriend.

One evening after work, Mike takes Celia on a date to Harryhausen's, a Japanese sushi restaurant, to honor her birthday. But their night is cut short when Sulley brings a little child into the restaurant, who inadvertently makes herself known as the CDA Agents raid and subsequently quarantine the restaurant in a giant green plasma dome. Celia is among the monsters who are decontaminated at that time, which then forces her and her snakes hairs to wear neck cones after enduring the decontamination, much to her embarrassment. Mike tries to help her, but is stopped by Sulley. Celia, now furious with Mike for her ruined birthday, angrily confronts him the next day, and unintentionally slips Mike's involvement in the incident the previous night, which Randall overhears and subsequently discovers. Later, when Mike and Sulley are being chased by Randall, Celia grabs onto Mike, threatening to break up with him if he does not tell her what is happening. Mike quickly explains that they are trying to get Boo back to her room, but Celia does not believe him at first until Boo appears over Sulley's shoulder, startling her into letting go. Realizing Mike was telling the truth, and upon seeing Randall chasing the trio, Celia (whose anger has started to diminish) creates a diversion by announcing that Randall has broken the all-time scare record, confusing Randall and giving Mike and Sulley enough time to bring Boo's door down to the Scare Floor. She is seen again at the end of the film, having fully recovered and reconciled with Mike, and tells him that a box full of magazines has just arrived. Both she and Mike are surprised to see that Mike has made the cover of the magazine.

While Celia does not physically appear in Monsters University, she is seen in a photo in Mike's locker room, where he puts up a new photo of himself and Sulley on their first day as a Scarer Team, next to Celia's near the end of the movie.

In the television series Monsters at Work, Celia gets promoted to floor supervisor by Mike when the board of directors puts him and Sulley in charge of the company.

==== Fungus ====
Fungus (voiced by Frank Oz in the film and Christopher Swindle in Monsters at Work) is Randall's red three-eyed assistant. Despite being partnered with Fungus, Randall seems to be annoyed by his antics and would often abuse and boss him around. Fungus also is terrified by Randall's behavior and his involvement in Waternoose's plot to kidnap human children and extract their screams forcibly, but feels either blackmailed or too intimidated to confront Randall, and is inwardly glad that Mike and Sulley are sabotaging the sinister conspiracy. When Randall attempts to test the extraction machine on Mike, Sulley puts Fungus on the chair and rescues Mike. The scream machine renders Fungus nearly unconscious and blanches him white, showing that the machine asphyxiates its victims. In the end following Randall's defeat and Waternoose's arrest, Fungus is forgiven for his involvement and is now happily taking on a job as Mike's assistant and making children laugh to collect more power.

==== Needleman and Smitty ====
Needleman and Smitty (both voiced by Daniel Gerson in the film, and Stephen Stanton in Monsters at Work) are two goofy monsters who work as maintenance and errand workers at Monsters, Inc. Both worship Sulley and the ground that he walks on. One of their jobs at Monsters, Inc. is to operate the Door Shredder, a woodchipper-like device that shreds the doors of children that are not afraid of monsters.

==== Scarers of Floor F ====
The Scarers of Scare Floor F are the co-workers at Monsters, Inc. Apart from Sulley and Randall Boggs, among these are:

- Augustus "Spike" Jones is a red slug-like monster with retractable purple spikes on his back. In Monsters University, it is shown that Spike had graduated from Fear Tech and was a former worker at Fear Co.
- Light Blue Peterson (Monster) (voiced by Jack Angel in the film and Bob Peterson in Monsters at Work) is a light blue dinosaur-like monster with removable sharp teeth. He is named after the filmmaker of the same name.
- George Sanderson (voiced by Sam Black in the film and Stephen Stanton in Monsters at Work) is a chubby one-horned orange furry monster who is good friends with Mike, Sulley, Lanky Schmidt, and Claws Ward. In Monsters University, he was a member of the Jaws Theta Chi fraternity. In Monsters, Inc., when George emerges from one of the doors with a sock on him, Charlie Proctor, his assistant, sees the sock and shouts "23-19", which ends up calling in the CDA Agents to take care of the situation. After the sock is removed and destroyed, George is then shaved, showered, and put into a neck cone.
- Harley Gerson is an orange monster with a large mouth and two legs. He named after Pixar employees Harley Jessup and Dan Gerson.
- Harry "Bud" Luckey is a thin turquoise octopus-like monster with long shaggy purple hair covering his face. He is a friend of Sulley and Mike Wazowski. Harry "Bud" Luckey was named after Pixar employee Bud Luckey.
- Joe 'JJ' Ranft is a red velvet monster with large hands and three eyes. He is named after Pixar employee Joe Ranft.
- Lanky Schmidt (voiced by Bob Bergen) is a monster with a small head and long arms and legs who is good friends with Claws Ward and George Sanderson. When interviewed about the "kid-tastrophe", he exaggerates that Boo flew over him and used laser vision to blast a car. When the factory transfers to laughter, Schmidt adapts well and his talent, utilizing a spinning bow tie, rivals Mike's.
- Pete "Claws" Ward (voiced by Joe Ranft) is a blue crocodile-like monster with retractable sharp claws and horrifying breath who is good friends with his assistant. When working on one door, he runs out and tells his assistant that the child he tried to scare almost touched him, resulting in his assistant calling for a door shredder making it the 58th door lost that week.
- Ricky Plesuski is a green monster with a large mouth and eight legs. In Monsters University, it is shown that Ricky Plesuski had graduated from Fear Tech and was a former worker at Fear Co. and Scream Industries.
- Noodles Rivera (voiced by Lee Unkrich) is a tall, slender orange monster with six tentacles for arms and four shorter tentacles for legs.
- Ted Pauley (voiced by Katherine Ringgold in the film and Christopher Swindle in Monsters at Work) is a huge purple monster with a gorilla-like stature and 16 removable eyes. In Monsters at Work, he has a visible mouth and has an English accent. Due to his lack of sense of humour, Ted fails to transfer to being a comedian. He named after Bob Pauley.

==== Assistants to the Scarers of Floor F ====
- Betty (voiced by Teresa Ganzel) is a blue monster who is the assistant of Noodles Rivera.
- Charlie Proctor (voiced by Philip Proctor) is a light green monster with two round eyes and tentacles for arms who is the assistant of George Sanderson.
- Chuck (voiced by Danny Mann) is a pinkish-beige frog-like monster with four arms and also assists Claws Ward. In the movie, there are four varieties of Claws' Assistant including him.
- Harley's Assistant is a turquoise monster with crab-like legs and a stalk with one eye who assists Harley Gerson.
- Pauley's Assistant is a five-eyed slug-like monster who assists Ted Pauley.
- Marge (voiced by Mickie McGowan) is a starfish-like monster and the assistant of Lanky Schmidt.
- Ranft's Assistant is a light green slender monster with around 4 or 5 legs who assists Joe Ranft.
- Luckey's Assistant is a red five-eyed slug-like monster and assists Harry "Bud" Luckey.
- Waxford is a five-eyed monster with tentacles for legs who is the assistant of Augustus "Spike" Jones.
- Ricky's Assistant is a three-eyed pistachio-like monster who assists Ricky Plesuski.

==== Thaddeus Bile ====
Thaddeus Bile (voiced by Jeff Pidgeon in the film and Christopher Swindle in Monsters at Work) is a trainee Scarer who is also called "Phlegm". He is a dinosaur-like monster, with a coloration on each of his arms and hands, spikes on the back of his head, and a spiky tail club. He was seen at the beginning of the movie botching his training by leaving the door open as well as being scared by the simulation child (voiced by Lisa Raggio) causing him to slip on a soccer ball and fall on some jacks. He is also seen at the Harryhausen's sushi restaurant, where he flees with panic as Boo runs amuck in the restaurant. By the time Monsters Inc. begins transition to laugh power, he begins working on Scare Floor F where he has successfully made children laugh by slipping on a soccer ball and falling on some jacks, while additionally incorporating a skateboard into his routine.

==== Ms. Flint ====
Ms. Flint (voiced by Bonnie Hunt) is a female employee at Monsters, Inc. that manages the simulation tests that monsters must pass in order to become scarers. Ms. Flint is a tall monster with fins attached to her eyes, has long, sharp claws, wears a black jacket and a long, snake-like tail. In Monsters at Work, it is revealed that she has a daughter named Thalia (voiced by Hadley Gannaway).

==== Jerry Slugworth ====
Jerry Slugworth (voiced by Steve Susskind) is a red monster with blue strips on the center and thick maroon around his torso and legs, and seven fingers who works as a floor manager for Scare Floor F.

=== Tony ===
Tony (voiced by Guido Quaroni) is a tall, slender orange monster with a moustache, four tentacles for arms and five shorter tentacles for legs. He is a grocer that works at Tony's Grossery and was first seen telling Mike and Sulley that somebody is about to break the All-Scare Record and throws them blood oranges while wishing them the best of luck.

=== Ted ===
Ted is the largest monster in the movie; he is so big, only his elephant-like legs, covered with large, coarse brown scales, are shown at all. He mainly communicates using chicken sounds, yet he roars in one baseball-themed short featuring him. He is shown at a crossroads waiting for the light to change with Mike and Sulley. Sulley says "good morning" up at him, he crows back, then the light turns green, and Ted stomps across the road, causing an earthquake with every step. Mike is not happy with Sulley after the encounter since Sulley points out, ignoring Ted's size, that Ted was walking to work. His point being that they should too, only to be responded to by Mike who is frustrated since he wanted to drive his red sports car.

=== Other characters ===
- Baby Smitty – (voiced by Joe's daughter Sophia Ranft) An infant slug-like monster who attends daycare and bites Mike Wazowski's hand, who is credited under the film's "Additional Voices".

== Appearing in Monsters University ==
=== University staff ===
==== Dean Abigail Hardscrabble ====
Abigail Hardscrabble (voiced by Helen Mirren) is the strict dean of Monsters University. She is a red, dragon-like monster with centipede-like legs and red bat wings. When Hardscrabble attended Monsters University in her youth, she was a member of the Eta Hiss Hiss sorority and is the founder and a four-time consecutive champion of the Scare Games.

==== Professor Derek Knight ====
Professor Derek Knight (voiced by Alfred Molina) is a dinosaur-like monster who teaches SCARING 101: Intro to Scaring at the School of Scaring. He often weeds out the least worthy students so that the best of the best can move on to becoming Scarers. Professor Knight is also shown to be a fan of Bill Sullivan, Sulley's father. When he is first seen during the exam that would determine who will take part in the School of Scaring, Dean Abigail Hardscrabble "assists" him where she weeds out Mike for not being scary and Sulley for doing an incorrect scare

Professor Knight is later seen in the opening of the first episode of Monsters at Work, overseeing Tylor's exam. He appears again in the first episode of the series' second season, introducing the Scream Kings and Queens of Monsters University during MU's homecoming football game halftime show.

==== Professor William Brandywine ====
Professor William Brandywine is a round monster with yellow fur whose eyes are invisible. He works at Monsters University's School of Engineering where he teaches Scream Canister Designs to his students. Don Carlton's character model was used to make Professor Brandywine.

==== Librarian ====
The Librarian (voiced by Marcia Wallace) is an elderly female monster who works at the library at Monsters University. She is a large slug-headed teacher with six monstrous tentacles for legs and gray hair. The Librarian is involved in the "Avoid the Parent" challenge of the Scare Games where the Librarian's reaction to noise is made to emulate the danger of parents and how a Scarer has to get along without being caught by one. Any team who is caught by the Librarian is thrown out of the library and eliminated from the competition, which was the case for Slugma Slugma Kappa. The Oozma Kappa bypass her with the help of vocal distractions after Sulley accidentally alerts her by toppling a ladder.

==== Ed the Janitor ====
Ed (voiced by Philip Proctor) is a janitor at Monsters University.

=== Oozma Kappa students ===
Oozma Kappa (OΚ) is one of the six fraternities at Monsters University. It is mostly filled with good-natured misfits. Besides the protagonists Mike and Sulley, among the members of Oozma Kappa are:

- Don Carlton (voiced by Joel Murray) is a reddish-purple-skinned, mature monster with a bat-shaped mustache and octopus-like tentacles for arms who returned to Monsters University to learn how to use computers and maybe consider trying for scaring. He is the President of Oozma Kappa. Don later got engaged to Scott "Squishy" Squibbles' mother Sherri. During the credits, it is shown that Don had gotten a job as a scarer at Monsters, Inc. under the moniker "Dangerous Don Carlton".
- Art (voiced by Charlie Day) is a purple furry monster with an arch shape and a questionable background (in a scene he revealed that he was in jail before). It is shown during the credits that he got a job as a scarer at Monsters, Inc.
- Scott "Squishy" Squibbles (voiced by Peter Sohn) is a five-eyed, pink-skinned jelly monster whose mother owns the fraternity house. It is shown during the credits that he got a job as a scarer at Monsters, Inc., under the moniker 'Scott "Scary" Squibbles'.
- Terri (voiced by Sean Hayes) and Terry Perry (voiced by Dave Foley) are a two-headed orange monster with one eye on each head, four arms, and tentacles for legs. Terri's head has one horn while Terry's head has two horns. Terri, a dance major, is the naively optimistic one of the two while Terry, an English major, is more morose but has a fondness for close-up magic. They are very different personality wise but they work well together as shown in the Scare Games. It is shown during the credits that they got a job as a scarer at Monsters, Inc., under the moniker "Terrifying Terry and Terri Perry".

=== Roar Omega Roar students ===
Roar Omega Roar (RΩR) is one of the six fraternities at Monsters University. It is made up of the best of the best as they are the smartest, most-skilled, and scariest monsters at Monsters University. Besides Randall, among the members of Roar Omega Roar are:

- Johnny J. "The Jaw" Worthington III (voiced by Nathan Fillion) is the confident President of Roar Omega Roar who is a big bully to Mike Wazowski and Oozma Kappa as well is the rest of the RORs. He competes against Mike in the last round of the Scare Games. During the credits, it is shown that Johnny got a job as a Scarer at Fear Co. By season two of Monsters at Work, he is now the company's CEO, and it is also revealed that his father founded the company. One of the things he has done was returned Randall Boggs to Monstropolis. By the season two finale, Johnny and Randall are arrested when their crimes were exposed.
- Chet "The Claw" Alexander (voiced by Bobby Moynihan) is a one-eyed crab-like monster who is the vice president of Roar Omega Roar. During the credits, it is shown that Chet got a job as a scarer at Fear Co. He competes against Terri and Terry in the final round of the Scare Games. He returns in Monsters at Work in the second season as a MERC agent working undercover as Johnny's assistant.
- Chip Goff is a purple monster with two horns and large fangs. He is the only member of the fraternity (Sulley not included) to wear a fraternity letterman jacket: the rest of the fraternity wear cardigans or letter sweaters in accordance with their "elite" image. He competes against Squishy in the final round of the Scare Games.
- "Howling" Javier Rios is an insect-like monster with four arms and pink eyes. He competes against Art in the final round of the Scare Games. During the credits, it is shown that he got a job as a scarer at Monsters, Inc.
- Reggie "Bruiser" Jacobs is a dark green monster with three eyes and grass-like hair all over his body. He competes against Don Carlton in the first wave, final round of the Scare Games during the scare simulator and loses to him. Johnny tells Reggie to "take an easy on Grandpa!" So after Don Carlton wins, he sarcastically tells Reggie "Thanks for taking it easy on Grandpa!" while smiling.

=== Python Nu Kappa students ===
Python Nu Kappa (PΝΚ) is one of the six sororities at Monsters University. The female students here - aside from being near identical to each other with minor color differences - are smart, frozen-hearted, and merciless. Every time they get announced or tell Oozma Kappa they're "going to rip them to pieces", they all hiss and their eyes glow even in the dark. In the Scare Games, Python Nu Kappa was eliminated after they got lost in the maze and accidentally scared teenagers during the "Don't Scare the Teen" event. According to the "Monsters University Essential Guide", all of the members of Python Nu Kappa want to work at a crematorium. Among the members of Python Nu Kappa are:

- Carrie Williams (voiced by Beth Behrs) is a three-eyed pink monster with red hair who is the fearless President of Python Nu Kappa. During the credits, it is shown that Carrie got a job as a scarer at Scream Industries (although the Scare Card picture shown is actually that of Britney Davis, a differently colored member of the sorority).

=== Jaws Theta Chi students ===
Jaws Theta Chi (JΘΧ) is one of the six fraternities at Monsters University. The students here are big on brawn and small on brainpower. In the Scare Games, Jaws Theta Chi was disqualified for using a protective gel that would prevent them from painful swelling upon coming in contact with the "child's toys" (glowing sea urchins) during the "Toxicity Challenge" event. Besides George Sanderson, among the members of Jaws Theta Chi are:

- Roy "Big Red" O'Growlahan (voiced by John Cygan) is a big red monster with eye stalks who is the President of Jaws Theta Chi. He competed with Chris J. Hicks (an Omega Howl student) to get Sulley into their group. He later appears during the third episode of Monsters at Work.
- Dirk Pratt is a yellow furry monster with sharp teeth and a mace at the end of his tail.
- Omar Harris is a small bean-like monster with six legs and bat-like wings. During the credits, it is shown that he got a job at Scream Industries.
- Percy Boleslaw is a one-eyed purple monster with horns.
- Baboso Goretega is a blue slug-like monster who appears in promotional material for the film. He is never seen in the final film (except for a minor appearance in a Fear Tech jacket).

=== Slugma Slugma Kappa students ===
Slugma Slugma Kappa (ΣΣΚ) is one of the six Sororities at Monsters University. The students here spend most of their days working out and running drills to perfect their scaring skills. In the Scare Games, Slugma Slugma Kappa was eliminated after they were caught by the Librarian during the "Avoid the Parent" event and thrown out thanks to a distraction from Oozma Kappa. Among the members of Slugma Slugma Kappa are:

- Carla Delgado is a pink monster with tentacles for arms and legs who is the President of Slugma Slugma Kappa. According to the "Monsters University Essential Guide", she is an ace swimmer.
- Brynn Larson is a purple three-eyed bean-shaped monster who can run fast.
- Debbie Gabler is a turquoise monster with turquoise hair. She has one eyestalk on top of her hair.
- Donna Soohoo is a purple snake-like monster with hair all over her head that is covering her face. During the credits, she gets a job at Monsters, Inc.
- Maria Garcia is an orange monster with parted hair covering one eye.
- Violet Steslick is a one-eyed purple monster with brown twisted horns.

=== Eta Hiss Hiss students ===
Eta Hiss Hiss (ΗSS) is one of the six Sororities at Monsters University. The students here have a goth and emo style. This was the sorority that Dean Hardscrabble was a part of when she attended Monsters University. In the Scare Games, Eta Hiss Hiss was eliminated after they did not find good hiding places in the "Hide and Sneak" event where they were caught by the referee. According to the "Monsters University Fearbook" and the "Monsters University Extensive Guide", the members of Eta Hiss Hiss are an award-winning A Cappella group. Among the members of Eta Hiss Hiss are:

- Rosie Levin is a big grey monster with glasses who is the president of Eta Hiss Hiss. Monsters at Work reveals she started working at Monsters, Inc. as a comedy student.
- Nadia Petrov is a pink three-eyed bean-shaped monster with purple hair. She is interested in books.
- Sonia Lewis is a blue snail-like monster with blackish blue hair.
- Susan Jensen is a tall monster with pink hair.
- Rhonda Boyd is a one-eyed snail like-monster.
- Nancy Kim is a short one-eyed monster.

=== Brock Pearson ===
Brock Pearson (voiced by Tyler Labine) is a massive purple bird-like monster with two horns on his head and sharp claws on his hands. He is the vice-president of the Greek Council. Brock and Claire commentate on the Scare Games.

=== Claire Wheeler ===
Claire Wheeler (voiced by Aubrey Plaza) is a three-eyed grey monster who is a member of the Greek Council. She and Brock commentate on the Scare Games. Claire was credited as "Greek Council President". In Monsters at Work, she works at Fear Co. and is married to CEO Johnny Worthington III with 2 children.

=== Slug Student ===
The Slug Student (voiced by Bill Hader) is a snail-like student of Monsters University. When school starts, the Slug Student slithers to get to his class. By the time he gets to his classroom in the post-credits scene, he learns from Ed the janitor that the school year is over and returns home.

He later appears in the fourth episode of Monsters at Work.

=== Sherry Squibbles ===
Ms. Sherry Squibbles (voiced by Julia Sweeney) is a monster who is the mother of Scott Squibbles. She also owns the Oozma Kappa fraternity house. By the end of the film, Sherry gets engaged to Don Carlton. She is also a Metalhead as proven in one scene where she listens to Metal music in her van.

=== Ms. Karen Graves ===
Ms. Karen Graves (voiced by Bonnie Hunt) is a pink snail-like monster that was Mike's grade school teacher.

=== "Frightening" Frank McCay ===
"Frightening" Frank McCay (voiced by John Krasinski) is a superstar Scarer who inspires Mike to want to be a Scarer. He is a tall, light blue monster with retractable claws, numerous spikes on his head, and five tentacles as legs.

=== Archie ===
Archie is the mascot of Fear Tech (a rival school of Monsters University) that Sulley steals, He is an orange scare pig with six legs and goat-like horns on his head. Mike later catches Archie by tipping over a trash can and trapping him. The other students gave Sulley the credit for catching Archie much to the dismay of Mike.

=== The Smile Squad ===
The Smile Squad is the team that helped Mike get registered for his first day and give him information about Monsters University. All of their names rhyme with "ay". Among the members are:

- Jay is a pink monster with two eyes on his head and tentacles for hands and legs. He contacts incoming students and directs them to the registration hall.
- Kay is a yellow bean-shaped monster with three eyes. She works at the registration table.
- Trey is a blue snail-like monster. He is in charge of taking the photo for a student's I.D. card.
- Fay is a blue monster with blue hair, two eyes on top of her head and tentacles for arms and legs. She gives new students an orientation tour of the university's facilities.
- Ray is blue monster with two eyes on his head. He is stationed at the dormitories and assigns new students their room.

=== Monsters, Inc. Professional Scarers ===
During Mike's childhood, his class encountered various Scarers in their field trip to Monsters, Inc.. Besides Frank McCay, among the famous Scarers are:

- "Jumping" Jerry Jablonski is a light green monster who is a recolored version of Rivera.
- "Screaming" Bob Gunderson is a shaggy red muskox-like monster with curly horns, bushy eyebrows that conceal his eyes completely, and a large mustache.
- Betty Stevenson is a red one-eyed monster with two large cow-like horns.
- Carl Johnson is a purple one-eyed monster with a single horn on his head.
- Carla "Killer Claws" Benitez (voiced by Alanna Ubach in Monsters at Work) is a tall yellow monster with long purple claws who was seen during Oozma Kappa's "field trip" to Monsters, Inc.. She later appears in Monsters at Work as a comedy student and later promoted to jokester.
- Carol Dallmar is a yellow monster who is a recolored version of Ricky Plesuski.
- Clive Carver is a light blue monster who is a recolored version of Augustus "Spike" Jones.
- Darryl Payne is a green monster with long, thin arms and legs, three eyes, and sharp spikes covering his body.
- Dorothy "The Pink Widow" Newbern is a pink pompom spider-like monster.
- Earl "The Terror" Thompson is a blue monster with four eyes and a dark blue mustache resembling a tarantula. He was a famous scarer working at Monsters, Inc., who had a particularly long career, continuing to scare at old age.
- Hank "The Tank" Knapp is a dark green, frog-like monster. In the earlier parts of the film, Hank argues with Frank about the superiority between Monsters University and Fear Tech.
- Jason Chiang is a red-and-yellow-striped monster with bat-like wings.
- Raj Kapoor is a purple rhinoceros-like monster with spike-like "hair" and a short horn on his nose.
- Rufus Remerez is a maroon monster that is a recolored version of Ricky Plesuski.
- The Kowalski Sisters - Tracey, Stacey and Casey are a three-headed purple dragon-like monster.
- Tommy Gill is a rectangular yellow monster with one eye, scale-like hair, and dark yellow spots.
- Walter "Wailing Walt" Friedman is a shaggy yellow monster with three horns on his head and two upward-pointing fangs.
- Willy Nowicki is a blue slug-like monster with bat wings and two horns on his head.
- Sheldon "Lockness" Kayola is a yellow mug-like bat with oranges in his horns on top of his bald soft head.

== Appearing in Monsters at Work ==
=== Tylor Tuskmon ===
Tylor Tuskmon (voiced by Ben Feldman) is a recent graduate of Monsters University. He was accepted into Monsters, Inc. the same day Waternoose was outed as CEO and the company switched energy sources from screaming to laughter. He transferred to the maintenance team, Monsters, Inc. Facilities Team (MIFT), while training as a comedy student. When Monsters, Inc. changed its policy from scaring to joking following Waternoose's arrest, Tylor was uncomfortable with the transition. He is promoted to a full-time Jokester in the season 1 finale. In season 2, he enters a crossroads when Johnny Worthington offers him a job at Fear Co. In the end, he remains a Jokester and is now part of a comedy duo with his best friend Val Little.

=== Val Little ===
Val Little (voiced by Mindy Kaling) is a mechanic at MIFT, and Tylor's best friend. Val was briefly in the same class as Tylor at Monsters University before she dropped out. After college, she spent a year on an island, then enlisted at MIFT as a mechanic. She becomes Tylor's Jokester assistant. In Season 2, she discovers and follows a talent at being a Jokester and eventually becomes one and shortly later as Monsters, Inc. first comedy duo with Tylor.

=== Mr. Crummyham ===
Mr. Crummyham (voiced by Curtis Armstrong) is a Monsters, Inc. supervisor. He transfers Tylor to MIFT when he learns that Tylor's parents work at a hardware store.

=== Monsters, Inc. Facilities Team ===
The Monsters, Inc. Facilities Team (or MIFT for short) is a department in Monsters, Inc. that deals with technical problems in the company. Besides Tylor and Val, MIFT consists of:

- Fritz (voiced by Henry Winkler) is a one-eyed monster with a trunk who is the leader of MIFT.
- Katherine "Cutter" Sterns (voiced by Alanna Ubach) is a three-eyed crab-like monster and member of MIFT. A running gag is that she is always mentioning other workers who died on the job.
- Duncan P. Anderson (voiced by Lucas Neff) is the deputy supervisor of MIFT with four eyestalks. He does not trust Tylor and attempts to get him dismissed from MIFT.
  - Roto (vocal effects provided by Bobs Gannaway) is Duncan's hamster-like emotional support animal.
- Roger Rogers/Henry J. Waternoose IV (voiced by Rhys Darby) is a five-eyed monster with green fur and blue tentacles who becomes MIFT's newest member after Tylor and Val are promoted to the Laugh Floor. He is the son of Henry Waternoose III.
- Sunny Sunshine (voiced by Paula Pell) is a grey, frog-like monster with black lipstick. She is head of the receiving station at Monsters Inc. and is shown to be in a romantic relationship with Cutter.

=== Winchester ===
Winchester (vocal effects provided by Dee Bradley Baker) is a former member of MIFT. Due to his inability to talk (he can merely make raspberry noises), his co-workers never learned his name until he left the group; they had nicknamed him "Banana Bread", since he always brought banana cakes and pastries to the briefing room. While trying to get Tylor to return to MIFT, Winchester catches Ms. Flint's attention, who promotes him to comedian.

=== Roze ===
Roze (voiced by Bob Peterson) is Roz's identical twin sister who is given Roz's position as secretary after her investigation work is complete. She shares her sister's complete disdain for Mike.

=== Millie Tuskmon ===
Millie Tuskmon (voiced by Aisha Tyler) is Tylor's mother.

=== Bernard Tuskmon ===
Bernard Tuskmon (voiced by John Ratzenberger) is Tylor's father who runs a hardware store at the bottom of the apartment building the Tuskmon family live in.

=== Virginia Tuskmon ===
Virginia Tuskmon (voiced by Jenifer Lewis) is Tylor's paternal grandmother who lives with him, her son Bernard, and daughter-in-law Millie in season 2. She loved living in the Creaky Oaks retirement home but believed she was kicked out for being too loud and opinionated. However, in "It's Coming From Inside the House!", she learns after calling the home that she wasn't kicked out due to her behavior. This leads to her son finally admitting that he could no longer afford to have her stay there and cover the family's rent at the same time, so he moved her back in with him to save the family's meager finances.

=== Otis ===
Otis (voiced by Bobs Gannaway) is Monsters, Inc.'s new receptionist after Celia gets promoted to floor supervisor by Mike.

=== Gary Gibbs ===
Gary Gibbs (voiced by Gabriel Iglesias) is a dark-blue monster, and Mike's polar opposite who is talented at bowling.
