= Monsters, Inc. (franchise) =

Disney and Pixar media franchise

- Created by: Pete Docter; Jill Culton; Jeff Pidgeon; Ralph Eggleston
- Developed by: Andrew Stanton Dan Gerson
- Original work: Monsters, Inc. (2001)
- Owner: Pixar Animation Studios
- Years: 2001–present

Films and television
- Films: Monsters, Inc. (2001); Monsters University (2013); Untitled third film (TBA)
- Short films: Mike's New Car (2002); Party Central (2013)
- Animated series: Monsters at Work (2021–2024)

Games
- Video games: List of video games

Audio
- Soundtracks: Monsters, Inc. (Original Motion Picture Soundtrack) (2001); Monsters University (Original Score) (2013); Monsters at Work (Original Soundtrack) (2021)
- Original music: Monsters, Inc. Scream Factory Favorites (2002)

Miscellaneous
- Theme park attractions: Monsters, Inc. Mike & Sulley to the Rescue! (2006–present); Monsters, Inc. Laugh Floor (2007–present); Monsters, Inc. Ride & Go Seek (2009–present); Monstropolis (2027)

Monsters, Inc. (also known as Monsters, Incorporated and simply Monsters) is an American media franchise of Pixar. The franchise takes place in a world parallel to the Earth where monsters are the citizens of society and harness the energy of human children to power their cities. The company known as Monsters, Inc. accomplishes this with portal doors which lead to their bedrooms.

== Feature films ==
Film	Release date	Director	Screenplay by	Story by	Produced by
Monsters, Inc.	November 2, 2001	Pete Docter	Andrew Stanton & Daniel Gerson	Pete Docter, Jill Culton, Jeff Pidgeon & Ralph Eggleston	Darla K. Anderson
Monsters University	June 21, 2013	Dan Scanlon	Dan Scanlon, Dan Gerson & Robert L. Baird	Dan Scanlon, Dan Gerson & Robert L. Baird	Kori Rae

=== Monsters, Inc. (2001) ===
Monsters, Inc. introduces the monster world, where Monstropolis is powered by the screams of human children as monsters enter the human world at night and scare children through their bedroom closets. One evening when a little girl called "Boo" accidentally enters the monster world, friends James P. Sullivan and Mike Wazowski must find a way to hide her from the authorities and return her to her world and, in the process, they learn that not everything they have been led to believe about humans is true.

The film was released on November 2, 2001, in the United States, surpassing Toy Story 2 (1999) and peaked as the second highest-grossing animated film of all time, behind Disney Animation's The Lion King (1994) at the time. Monsters, Inc. was one of the first animated films to be nominated for the Academy Award for Best Animated Feature.

=== Monsters University (2013) ===
A prequel to the first film, Monsters University tells Sulley and Mike's backstory. The future friends meet at college and initially start off as enemies, but end up on the same team in the university's "Scare Games", where they and their team of misfits must beat the odds and win the competition, or be expelled from school. As the team struggles, the two learn to work together, and slowly become best friends. The film was released in the United States on June 21, 2013.

=== Untitled third film (TBA) ===
In March 2026, reports circulated that a third film in the franchise was in development.

== Television series ==
Monsters at Work is a sequel television series to Monsters, Inc. produced by Disney Television Animation for Disney+. It was announced in a Disney press release on November 9, 2017, as part of a list of in development series for the Walt Disney Company's then-upcoming streaming service. On April 9, 2019, it was revealed that the show would be titled Monsters at Work and premiere in spring 2021. Seven of the original cast would return, including John Goodman and Billy Crystal reprising their roles as Sulley and Mike, respectively. On February 24, 2021, it was announced that it would be released on July 2, followed by a delay to July 7. In September 2021, it was indicated that a second season is in development. It was later officially announced at Annecy International Animation Film Festival 2022, with Kevin Deters and Stevie Wermers replacing Bobs Gannaway and Stephen Anderson as showrunner and supervising director for season 2. The second season was released on April 5, 2024, on Disney Channel and was released on Disney+ on May 5, 2024.

The series begins the day after Monsters, Incorporated has switched to laugh power and follows Tylor Tuskmon (Ben Feldman), who hopes to be promoted to the Laugh Floor alongside Mike and Sulley.

== Short films ==
=== Party Central (2013) ===
Party Central is a six-minute short animated film, featuring characters from Monsters University. It premiered on August 9, 2013, at the D23 Expo. The short was set to be released theatrically with The Good Dinosaur in 2014, before the film was pushed back to 2015. Instead, it was theatrically released on March 21, 2014, with Muppets Most Wanted. The short was written and directed by Kelsey Mann, story supervisor on Monsters University. The cast consists of Billy Crystal, John Goodman, Peter Sohn, Julia Sweeney, Charlie Day, Nathan Fillion, Dave Foley, Sean Hayes, Bobby Moynihan, and Joel Murray.

Set shortly after the events of Monsters University, the Oozma Kappa fraternity organizes a party, but no one shows up. Mike and Sulley arrive and use door stations to steal visitors from another party at the Roar Omega Roar fraternity.

== Reception ==
=== Box office performance ===
The film series has grossed a total of $1,306,110,769, making the Monsters, Inc. franchise the 15th highest-grossing animated film franchise.

Monsters, Inc. ranked No. 1 at the box office its opening weekend, grossing $62,577,067 in North America alone. The film had a small drop-off of 27.2% over its second weekend, earning another $45,551,028. In its third weekend, the film experienced a larger decline of 50.1%, placing itself in the second position just after Harry Potter and the Philosopher's Stone. In its fourth weekend, however, there was an increase of 5.9%. Making $24,055,001 that weekend for a combined total of over $562 million. It is the seventh biggest (in US$) fourth weekend ever for a film.

Monsters University has earned $268,227,670 in North America, and $475,066,843 in other territories, for a worldwide total of $743,294,513. The film earned $136.9 million on its opening weekend worldwide. For unknown reasons, Disney declined to provide a budget for the film, although Boxoffice.com cites a budget of a total of $270 million. Entertainment Weekly speculated that it was higher than that of Brave ($185 million), mostly due to high cost of John Goodman and Billy Crystal reprising their roles. Shockya, a subsidiary website of CraveOnline, estimated the budget to be $200 million, on par with Toy Story 3 (2010) and Cars 2 (2011).

Film	U.S. release date	Box office gross			All-time ranking		Budget	Ref.
Film	U.S. release date	U.S. and Canada	Other territories	Worldwide	U.S. and Canada	Worldwide	Budget	Ref.
Monsters, Inc.	November 2, 2001	$289,916,256	$272,900,000	$562,816,256	#114	#196	$115,000,000	
Monsters University	June 21, 2013	$268,492,764	$475,066,843	$743,559,607	#125	#123	$200,000,000	
Total		$558,143,926	$747,966,843	$1,306,110,769			$315,000,000	

=== Critical and public response ===
Film	Critical		Public
Film	Rotten Tomatoes	Metacritic	CinemaScore
Monsters, Inc.	96% (191 reviews)	79 (35 reviews)	A+
Monsters University	80% (201 reviews)	65 (41 reviews)	A
Monsters at Work	65% (26 reviews)	55 (9 reviews)	—N/a

== Cast and characters ==
List indicators

This section includes characters who will appear or have appeared in the Monsters, Inc. franchise.

- An empty grey cell indicates the character was not in the film, or that the character's official presence has not yet been confirmed.
- ^{Y} indicates a younger version of the character.

Character	Feature films		Short films		Television series	
Character	Monsters, Inc.	Monsters University	Mike's New Car	Party Central	Monsters at Work	
Character	Monsters, Inc.	Monsters University	Mike's New Car	Party Central	Season 1	Season 2
James P. "Sulley" Sullivan	John Goodman	John Goodman	John Goodman	John Goodman	John Goodman	John Goodman
Michael "Mike" Wazowski	Billy Crystal	Billy Crystal Noah Johnston^{Y}	Billy Crystal	Billy Crystal	Billy Crystal	Billy Crystal
Boo	Mary Gibbs					Drawing
Randall "Randy" Boggs	Steve Buscemi	Steve Buscemi				Steve Buscemi
Henry J. Waternoose III	James Coburn	Photograph			Photograph	Photograph
Celia Mae	Jennifer Tilly	Photograph			Jennifer Tilly	Roxana Ortega
Roz CDA Agent #001	Bob Peterson	Bob Peterson			Bob Peterson	Bob Peterson
Jeff Fungus	Frank Oz				Christopher Swindle	Christopher Swindle
Smitty	Daniel Gerson				Stephen Stanton	Stephen Stanton
Needleman	Daniel Gerson				Stephen Stanton	Stephen Stanton
Jerry Slugworth	Steve Susskind		Silent cameo			
Yeti Abominable / Adorable Snowman	John Ratzenberger	John Ratzenberger			John Ratzenberger	John Ratzenberger
Mrs. Flint	Bonnie Hunt	Photograph			Bonnie Hunt	Bonnie Hunt
Thaddeus "Phlegm" Bile	Jeff Pidgeon				Christopher Swindle	Christopher Swindle
George Sanderson	Sam Black	Unspecified voice actor		Silent cameo	Stephen Stanton	Stephen Stanton
Charlie	Phil Proctor	Silent cameo			Christopher Swindle	Christopher Swindle
Peter "Claws" Ward	Joe Ranft	Silent cameo in end credits			Silent cameo	Silent cameo
Dean Abigail Hardscrabble		Helen Mirren				
Professor Derek Knight		Alfred Molina			Alfred Molina	Alfred Molina
Scott "Squishy" Squibbles		Peter Sohn		Peter Sohn		
Don Carlton		Joel Murray		Joel Murray		
Terry Perry		Dave Foley		Dave Foley		
Terri Perry		Sean P. Hayes		Sean P. Hayes		
Art		Charlie Day		Charlie Day		
Sherri Squibbles		Julia Sweeney		Julia Sweeney		
Johnny J. Worthington III		Nathan Fillion		Nathan Fillion		Nathan Fillion
Chet Alexander		Bobby Moynihan		Bobby Moynihan		Bobby Moynihan
Carrie Williams		Beth Behrs		Unspecified voice actress		
Brock Pearson		Tyler Labine				
Claire Wheeler		Aubrey Plaza				Aubrey Plaza
Mrs. Karen Graves		Bonnie Hunt				
"Frightening" Frank McCay		John Krasinski				Silent cameo
Rosie Levin		Colleen O'Shaughnessey			Alanna Ubach	Alanna Ubach
Referee		Bill Hader				
Vinny		Bill Hader			Silent cameo	
Carla "Killer Claws" Benitez		Silent cameo			Alanna Ubach	Alanna Ubach
Mom				Colleen O'Shaughnessey		
Henry				Kevin James Ward		
Timmy				Cristina Pucelli		
Tylor Tuskmon					Ben Feldman	Ben Feldman
Fritz					Henry Winkler	Henry Winkler
Val Little					Mindy Kaling	Mindy Kaling
Duncan P. Anderson					Lucas Neff	Lucas Neff
Katherine "Cutter" Sterns					Alanna Ubach	Alanna Ubach
Roze					Bob Peterson	Bob Peterson
Roto					Bobs Gannaway	
Winchester "Banana Bread"					Dee Bradley Baker	
Gary Gibbs					Gabriel Iglesias	
Otis					Bobs Gannaway	
Millie Tuskmon					Aisha Tyler	Aisha Tyler
Bernard Tuskmon					John Ratzenberger	John Ratzenberger
Mr. Crummyham					Curtis Armstrong	Curtis Armstrong
Virginia Tuskmon Grandma Tuskmon						Jenifer Lewis
Jack						Joe Lo Truglio
Jill						Ali Wong
Roger Rogers Henry J. Waternoose IV						Rhys Darby

== Crew ==
Role	Films	
Role	Monsters, Inc.	Monsters University
Director(s)	Pete Docter Co-Directors: Lee Unkrich; David Silverman	Dan Scanlon
Producer(s)	Darla K. Anderson	Kori Rae
Writer(s)	Screenplay by: Andrew Stanton; Daniel Gerson Story by: Pete Docter; Jill Culton; Jeff Pidgeon; Ralph Eggleston	Daniel Gerson; Robert L. Baird; Dan Scanlon
Executive Producer(s)	John Lasseter; Andrew Stanton	John Lasseter; Andrew Stanton; Pete Docter; Lee Unkrich
Composer	Randy Newman	Randy Newman
Editor(s)	Robert Grahamjones; Jim Stewart	Greg Snyder
Studio	Pixar Animation Studios	Pixar Animation Studios
Distributor	Walt Disney Studios Motion Pictures	Walt Disney Studios Motion Pictures

== Video games ==
- Monsters, Inc. (Game Boy Color, Game Boy Advance, PlayStation 2)
- Monsters, Inc. Scream Team (PlayStation, Microsoft Windows, PlayStation 2)
- Monsters, Inc. Scream Arena (GameCube)
- Monsters, Inc. Scream Team Training (Microsoft Windows, Mac OS X)
- Monsters, Inc. Bowling for Screams (Microsoft Windows, Mac OS X)
- Monsters, Inc. Eight Ball Chaos (Microsoft Windows, Mac OS X)
- Monsters, Inc. Monster Tag (Microsoft Windows, Mac OS X)
- Monsters, Inc. Pinball Panic (Microsoft Windows, Mac OS X)
- Mike's Monstrous Adventure (Microsoft Windows, Mac OS X)
- Cars Mater-National Championship (PlayStation 2, PlayStation 3, Xbox 360, Microsoft Windows, Nintendo DS, Game Boy Advance, Wii)
- Cars Race-O-Rama (PlayStation 2, PlayStation 3, Xbox 360, Wii, Nintendo DS, PlayStation Portable)
- Monsters, Inc. Run (iOS)
- Monsters University: Catch Archie (Android, iOS)
- Disney Infinity (PlayStation 3, Xbox 360, Wii, Wii U, Nintendo 3DS)
- Disney Magic Kingdoms (Android, iOS, Microsoft Windows)
- Lego The Incredibles (PlayStation 4, Xbox One, Nintendo Switch, Microsoft Windows, macOS)
- Kingdom Hearts III (PlayStation 4, Xbox One, Nintendo Switch, Microsoft Windows)
- Disney Heroes: Battle Mode (Android, iOS)
- Disney Mirrorverse (Android, iOS)
- Disney Dreamlight Valley (PlayStation 4, PlayStation 5, Xbox One, Xbox Series X/S, Nintendo Switch, Microsoft Windows, macOS)

== Theme park attractions ==
=== Monsters, Inc. Mike & Sulley to the Rescue! ===
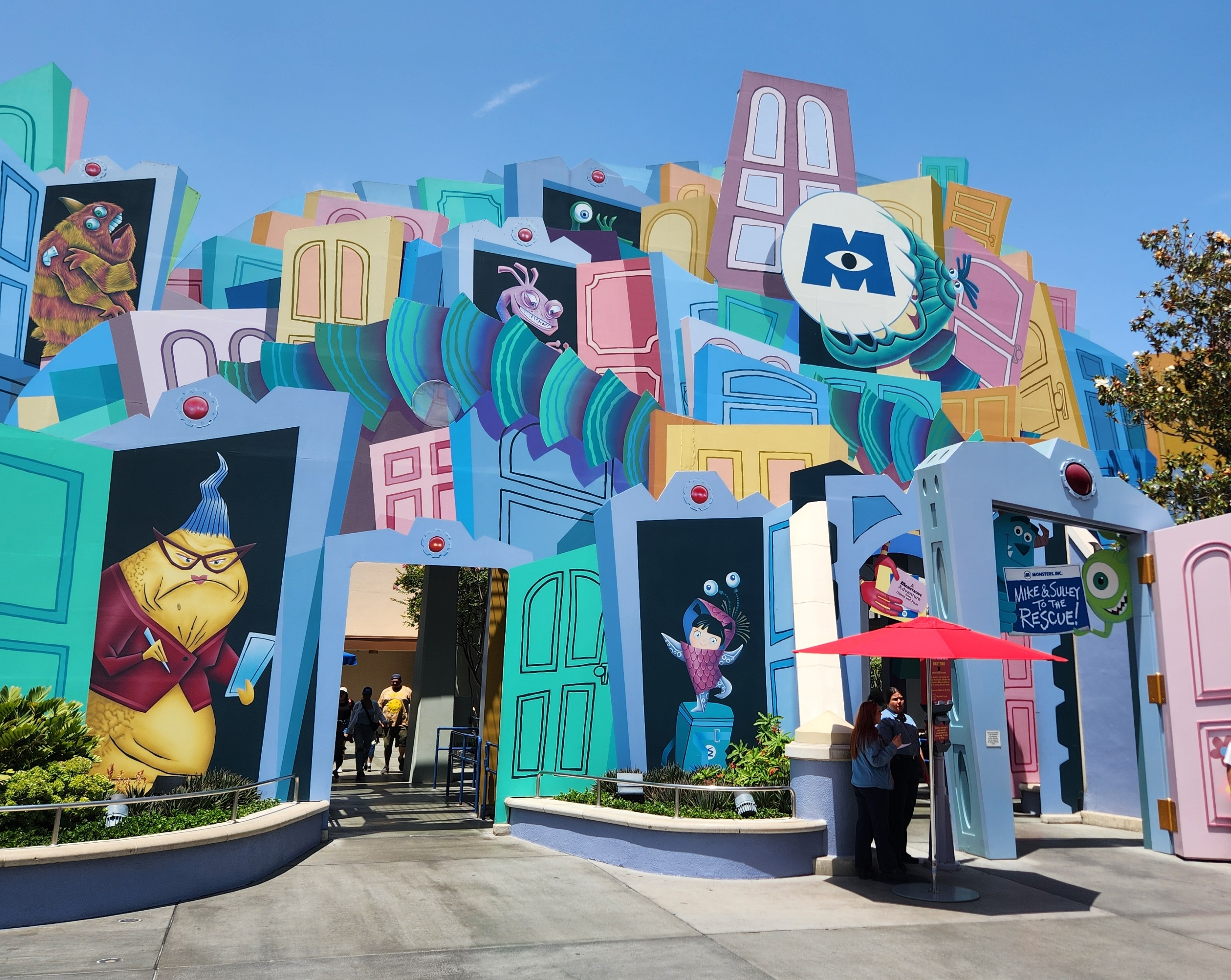
Monsters, Inc. Mike & Sulley to the Rescue! attraction facade

Monsters, Inc. Mike & Sulley to the Rescue! is a dark ride attraction in Hollywood Land at Disney California Adventure at the Disneyland Resort in Anaheim, California. It opened on January 22, 2006 and replaced the Superstar Limo dark ride, which permanently closed four years prior on January 11, 2002. The ride takes place during the events of the first Monsters, Inc. film. Guests board a taxi and go through the streets of Monstropolis, teaming up with Mike and Sulley to bring Boo home while hiding her from the CDA and Randall Boggs. The ride features a Harryhausen's restaurant scene with a ginger smell inside the room, a massive door vault featuring doors moving on conveyer belts, a pepper's ghost illusion of Randall appearing in the locker room, and an interactive finale, where Roz roasts you before you exit your taxi. In June 2025, Disney would officially announce that this attraction, along with the entirety of the Hollywood Pictures Backlot area, a small section located towards the back of Hollywood land, would be razed and demolished to make way for a new Avatar-themed land. Originally, the area was going to close in early 2026, as said in the announcement, but Disney would later announce that construction for the Avatar-themed area wouldn’t start until sometime in 2027.

=== Monsters, Inc. Laugh Floor ===
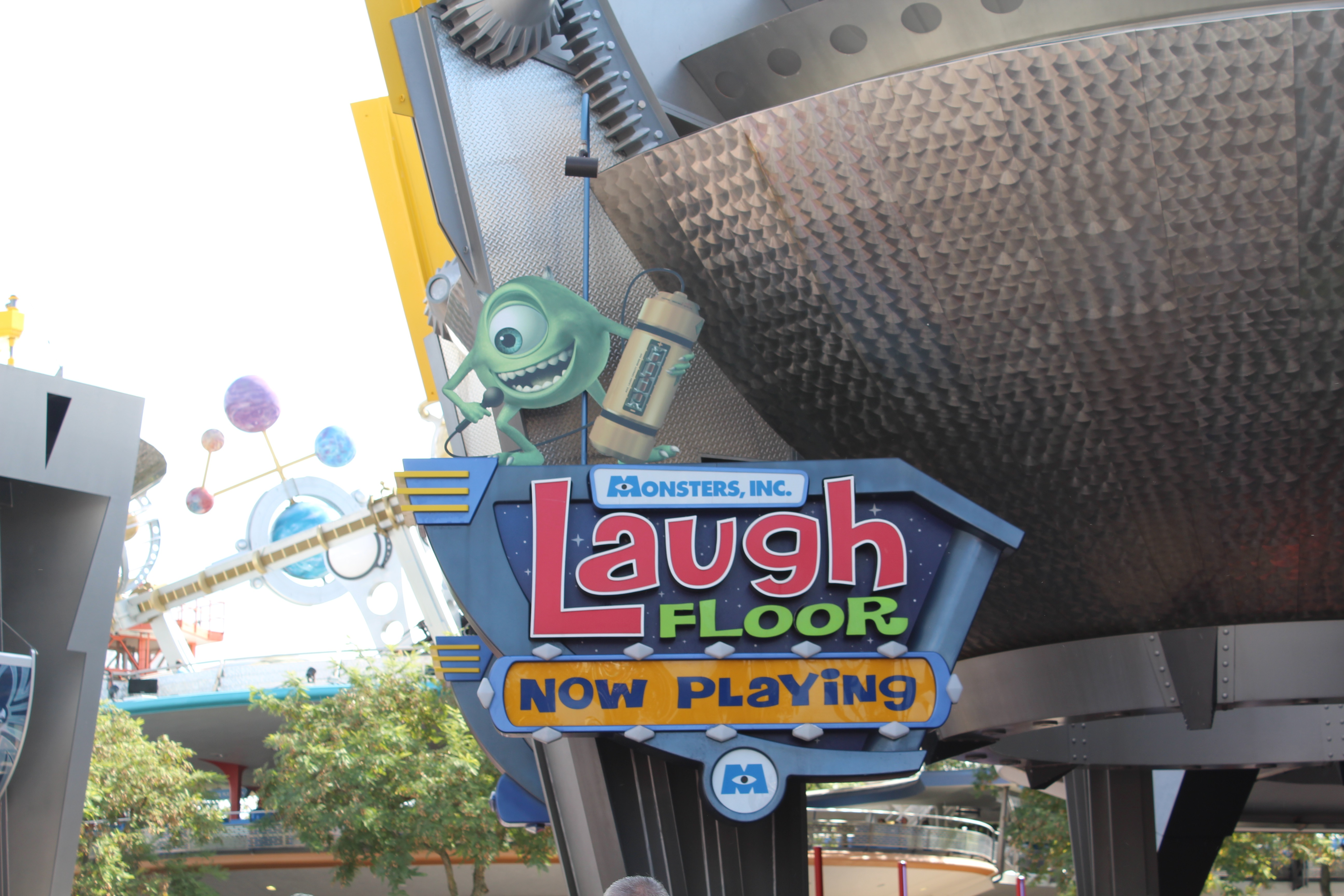
The original Monsters, Inc. Laugh Floor sign that was used between 2007 and 2019

Monsters, Inc. Laugh Floor is an interactive animated comedy club show attraction based on the Monsters, Inc. franchise in Tomorrowland at Magic Kingdom in Orlando, Florida.

It opened on April 2, 2007, replacing the Circle-Vision attraction The Timekeeper. Mike Wazowski and Roz make appearances. By November 2006, the attraction as Monsters, Inc. Laugh Floor Comedy Club was going through a testing phase, expecting regular operation in January 2007. The attraction was nominated for the 6th Annual VES Awards – Outstanding Visual Effects in a Special Venue Project in 2008.

Subsequent to the 2013 release of Monsters University, a new "commercial" sequence was added during the pre-show which has Monsters University student Art advertise the "Monsters University School of Laughter", replacing the "Comedy Detection Agency" sequence that Mike introduces.

On October 27, 2020, following Walt Disney World's reopening after its temporary closure due to the COVID-19 pandemic, the resort announced the layoff of several entertainment shows, including the Citizens of Hollywood at Disney's Hollywood Studios. These layoffs were the result of a dispute between the Actors' Equity Association and Walt Disney World, which also affected the cast providing live voices for Monsters, Inc. Laugh Floor. The attraction has since reopened with limited actors.

=== Monsters, Inc. Ride & Go Seek ===
Ride & Go Seek is an interactive dark ride attraction in Tokyo Disneyland at Tokyo Disney Resort. It opened on April 15, 2009 and replaced Meet the World.

=== Monstropolis ===
In August 2024, it was announced that a Monsters, Inc. themed land will be built at Disney's Hollywood Studios. The land will include Disney's first suspended roller coaster. In November 2024, it was announced that Muppet*Vision 3D would close to make room for the land. Construction began in 2025. In October 2025, it was revealed that the land will be called Monstropolis.

== Monsters Funday Football ==
On December 8, 2025, Monday Night Football hosted two distinct viewing options across eight platforms for the Week 14 matchup between the NFC East leading Philadelphia Eagles and the Wild Card-positioned Los Angeles Chargers played at Sofi Stadium in Inglewood, California. Monsters Funday Football was a complementary session for fans bringing them into the Monsters, Inc. universe, providing a real-time, animated, Monday Night Football viewing experience. Keeping with the kids' themed NFL broadcasts that Nickelodeon had originally popularized and ESPN had more recently utilized, this game was set in Monstropolis, with the entire broadcast being adjusted to have a Monsters Inc. theme. Sully was shown as a player for the Chargers and Mike as a player for the Eagles, with both rotating positions all throughout the game. The broadcast also incorporated many other characters, such as Roz and Archie the Scare Pig. Additionally, there was a cheer canister competition that pit Sully and Mike against each other that took place throughout the entirety of the game, including a three-event halftime competition between the two. Although Mike won this competition by 2 canisters, the Chargers won the game in overtime, 22-19.
