= Mary Gibbs (actress) =

American voice actress

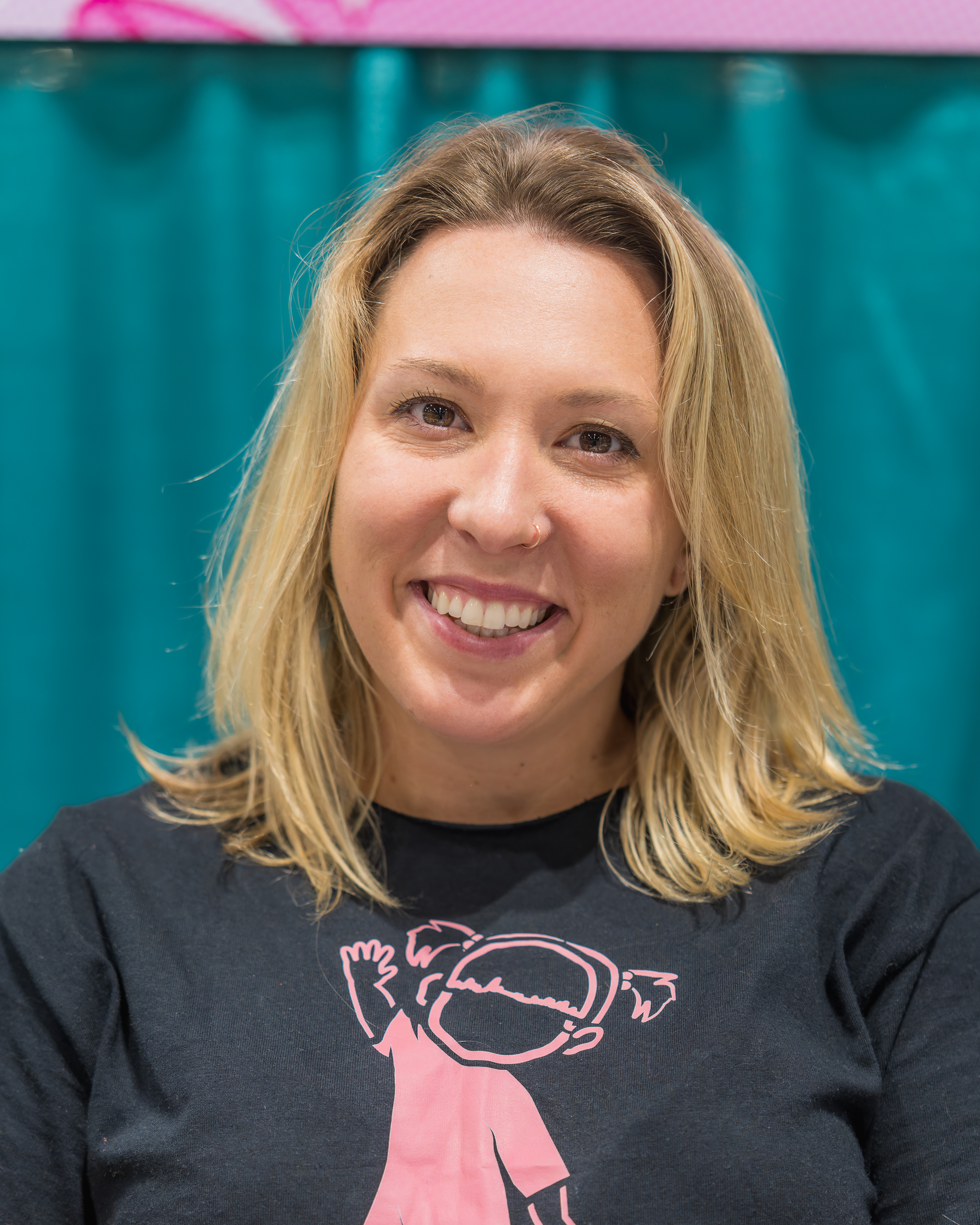
- Gibbs at Animate! Orlando in 2026
- Born: Pasadena, California, U.S.
- Occupations: Voice actress, YouTuber
- Years active: 1998–2004, 2013–present
- Known for: Voice of Boo in Monsters, Inc.

YouTube information
- Channel: @BooGrownUp
- Years active: 2020–present
- Genres: Lifestyle; Personal life experiences; Vlogs; Travel; Art; Music; Comic-Cons; Skin tutorials; Voice acting; Holistic health/yoga
- Subscribers: 2.29K thousand
- Views: 108.6K thousand

Mary Gibbs is an American voice actress and YouTuber. She is best known for voicing Boo in the Pixar animated film Monsters, Inc. (2001).

== Life and career ==
Mary Gibbs was born in Pasadena, California, to Pixar director and story artist Rob Gibbs (1964–2020) and his wife Susan (née Hollands). One of the production babies listed in the film credits of Toy Story 2 (1999) is Mary; Rob Gibbs was the story artist for that film.

As Gibbs was a toddler at the time she was recorded as the voice of Boo in Monsters, Inc. (2001), her parents helped the crew simulate scenarios that would elicit the required audio reactions that would be her lines; recording was difficult nevertheless because she would run all over the Pixar office. When Pixar's Inside Out (2015) was in production, the audio recordings of Gibbs' screams as Boo were reused for baby Riley. As a teenager, Gibbs suffered from scoliosis before she had surgery in 2012 to fix it.

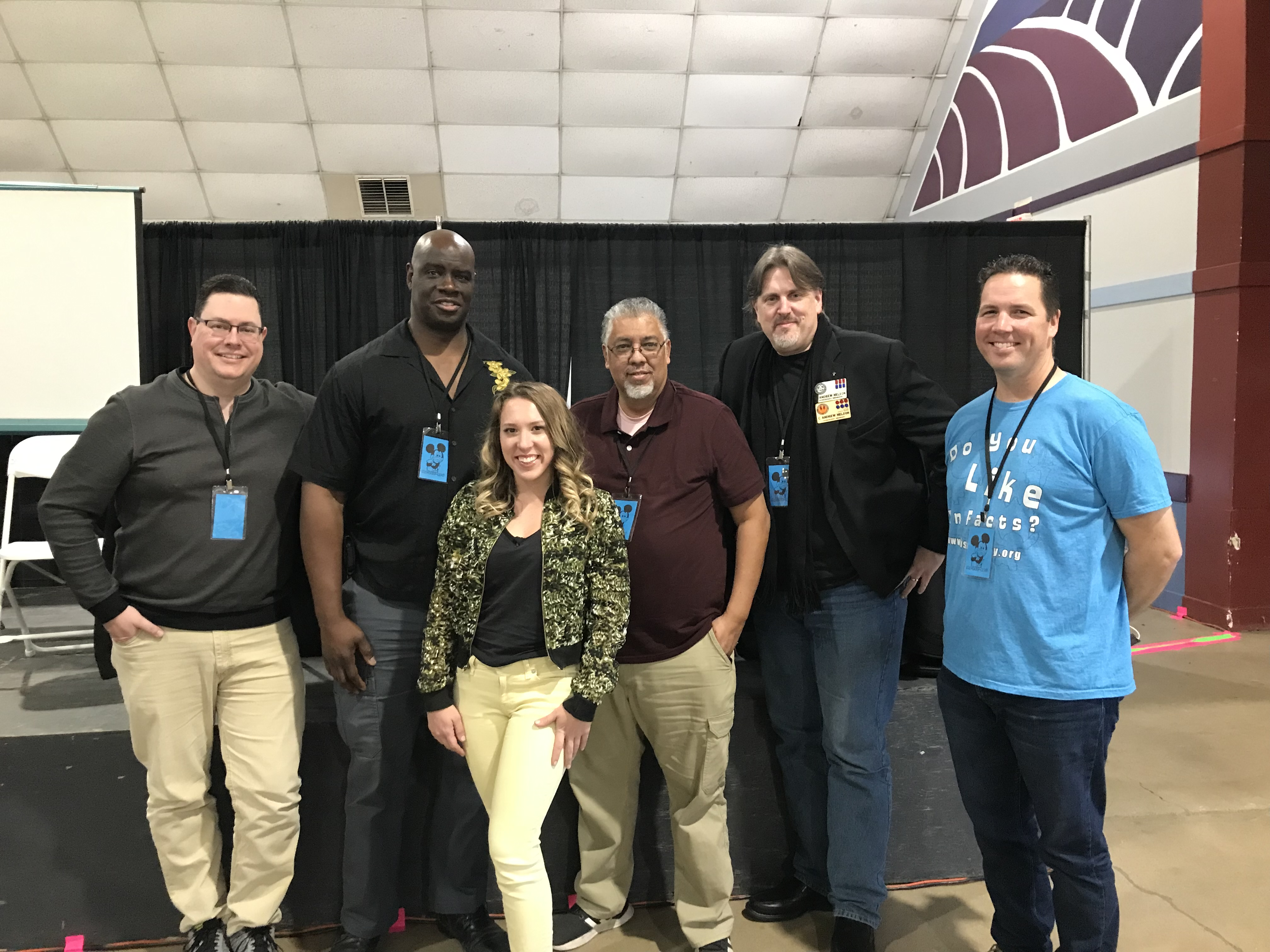
2022 Bakersfield Mouse-Con Heroes of Extinction panel

Gibbs returned to voice acting in 2022, voicing the character of Janessa Jensen in the audio-drama series Heroes of Extinction for Adventurous Ideas, LLC. In January 2022, Gibbs spoke on a panel at the Bakersfield Mouse-Con event about the project alongside other actors and producers of the series: Jason Braden, Isaac C. Singleton Jr., Jerry Cornell, C. Andrew Nelson, and Joshua C. Shaffer.

Gibbs has been documenting her life and time as Boo on her YouTube channel, Boo Grown Up.

== Filmography ==
=== Film ===
Year	Title	Voice role	Notes
1998	The Lion King II: Simba's Pride	Baby Kiara	Direct-to-video
2001	Monsters, Inc.	Boo	
2002	Monsters, Inc. DVD Read-Along	Boo	Video short/archive recordings
2013	Monsters University	Girl in cabin	Archive recordings
2015	Inside Out	Baby Riley	Archive recordings
2017	The Last Guest	Charlotte	English dub

=== Video games ===
Year	Title	Voice role	Notes
2001	Monsters, Inc.	Boo	Archive recordings
2001	Monsters, Inc. Scream Team Training	Boo	Archive recordings
2002	Mike's Monstrous Adventure	Boo	Archive recordings
2002	Monsters, Inc. Scream Arena	Boo	Archive recordings
2019	Kingdom Hearts III	Boo	Archive recordings

=== Attractions ===
Year	Title	Voice role	Notes
2006	Monsters, Inc. Mike & Sulley to the Rescue!	Boo	Archive recordings

=== Radio ===
Year	Title	Voice role	Notes
2022–2023	Heroes of Extinction	Janessa Jensen	7 episodes (audio drama)
2022	The Lowdown at the Down Low	Herself	1 episode
