= Monsters, Inc. Run =

2012 mobile game

Monsters, Inc. Run was a mobile game developed by Get Set Games and released in late 2012 based on Pixar's Monsters, Inc. franchise, based on their earlier game Mega Run. It was discontinued September 1, 2015.
