= WonderCon =

Annual convention

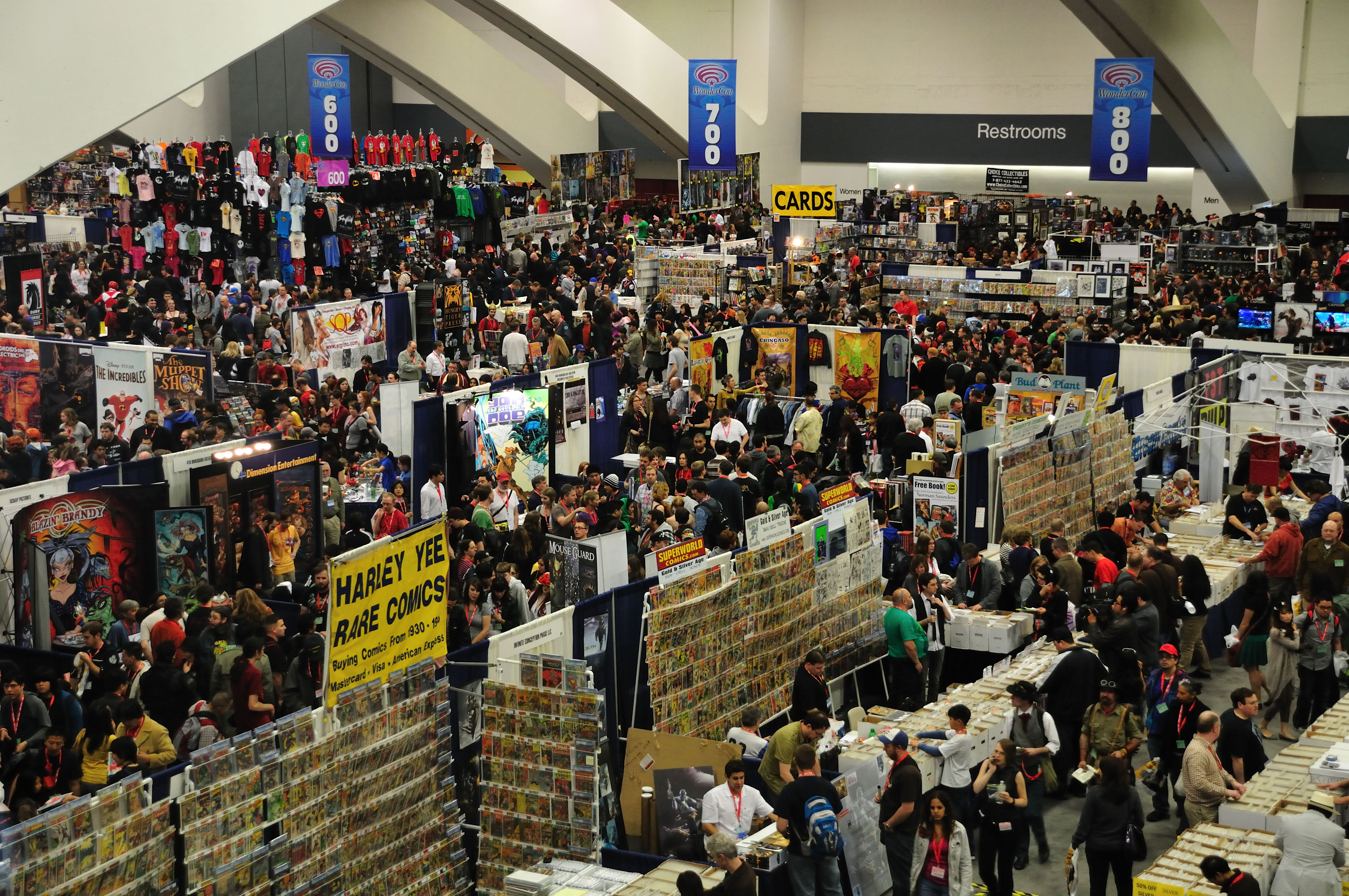
- The WonderCon 2010 main exhibit hall in the Moscone Center in San Francisco
- Status: Active
- Genre: Multi-genre
- Venue: 1987–2002: Oakland Convention Center; 2003–2011: Moscone Center; 2012–2015 Anaheim Convention Center; 2016: Los Angeles Convention Center; 2017–present: Anaheim Convention Center
- Location: California
- Coordinates: 37.8000°N 122.4000°W
- Country: United States
- Inaugurated: May 2, 1987; 39 years ago (as Wonderful World of Comics Convention)
- Most recent: March 27, 2026; 7 months ago
- Next event: March 26, 2027; 4 months' time
- Attendance: 60,000 (2016)
- Organizer: Comic-Con International
- Filing status: Nonprofit
- Website: www.comic-con.org/wc/

WonderCon is an annual comic book, science fiction, and film convention. It was originally held in the San Francisco Bay Area (1987–2011), before moving to Anaheim, California under the name WonderCon Anaheim (2012–2015, 2017–present). Due to construction at the Anaheim Convention Center, the convention was held in Los Angeles in 2016 under the name WonderCon Los Angeles.

The convention was conceived by retailer John Barrett (a founder of the retail chain Comics and Comix) and originally held in the Oakland Convention Center. In 2003, it moved to San Francisco's Moscone Center. The show's original name was the Wonderful World of Comics Convention.

== History ==
Retailer Joe Field (of Flying Colors Comics and Other Cool Stuff) and his partner Mike Friedrich owned and operated the convention for fifteen years. In 2001, they brokered a deal with the management team which runs San Diego Comic-Con to make it part of the Comic-Con International convention family. That gave the San Francisco show a wider audience and has made it a venue for previews and early screenings of major motion pictures, in particular ones based on comic books. The events have included Spider-Man 2 in 2004, Batman Begins and Fantastic Four in 2005, Superman Returns in 2006, 300 in 2007, Watchmen in 2009, and Kick-Ass in 2010. All of the events featured the stars of the movies fielding questions from the audience. WonderCon had 34,000 attendees in 2009, 39,000 in 2010, and 49,500 in 2011.

The show left the Bay Area after the 2011 convention, because San Francisco's Moscone Center was being remodeled. The convention moved to Anaheim in 2012, and was rebranded WonderCon Anaheim. When the move to Anaheim was first announced, Comic-Con International said they would be returning to San Francisco after the Moscone Center renovations were complete; however, the convention ultimately stayed in Southern California. In 2016, a new convention started in the Bay Area, called the Silicon Valley Comic Con.

WonderCon moved from Anaheim to Los Angeles in 2016, and is now called WonderCon Los Angeles and was held March 25–27, 2016 at the Los Angeles Convention Center. The 2017 edition of the convention returned to Anaheim and was held March 31 – April 2, 2017. The WonderCon logo was designed by Richard Bruning and Tim Zach.

Logo for WonderCon@Home

The 2020 edition of the show, scheduled for April 10–12, was cancelled due to the COVID-19 pandemic. The 2021 edition of the show, scheduled for March 26–27, was cancelled again due to the COVID-19 pandemic.

=== Event history ===
| Dates | Location | Guests |
|---|---|---|
| May 2–3, 1987 | Oakland Convention Center; Oakland, California | |
| April 23–24, 1988 | Oakland Convention Center; Oakland, California | |
| April 28–30, 1989 | Oakland Convention Center; Oakland, California | |
| May 11–13, 1990 | Oakland Convention Center; Oakland, Calif. | Dan Brereton, Erik Larsen, Jim Lee, Rob Liefeld, Ron Lim, Ken Macklin, Chris Marrinan, Trina Robbins, Jim Valentino, Tim Vigil, Marv Wolfman |
| April 24–26, 1992 | Oakland Convention Center; Oakland, California | |
| April 22–24, 1994 | Oakland Convention Center; Oakland, California | |
| April 26–28, 1996 | Oakland Convention Center; Oakland, California | |
| April 1–3, 2001 | Oakland Convention Center; Oakland, California | |
| April 19–21, 2002 | Oakland Convention Center; Oakland, Calif. | |
| April 25–27, 2003 | Moscone Center; San Francisco | |
| April 30 – May 2, 2004 | Moscone Center; San Francisco | |
| February 18–20, 2005 | Moscone Center North; San Francisco | |
| February 10–12, 2006 | Moscone Center West; San Francisco | |
| March 2–4, 2007 | Moscone Center South; San Francisco | |
| February 22–24, 2008 | Moscone Center South; San Francisco | |
| February 27 – March 1, 2009 | Moscone Center South; San Francisco | |
| April 2–4, 2010 | Moscone Center South; San Francisco | Peter S. Beagle, Geoff Johns, Adam Kubert, Jimmy Palmiotti, Tim Powers, Kevin Smith, Judd Winick |
| April 1–3, 2011 | Moscone Center South; San Francisco | Sergio Aragonés, Robert Kirkman, Francis Manapul, Joe Quesada, Frank Quitely, Amy Reeder, Bill Sienkiewicz, Judd Winick, Marv Wolfman |
| March 16–18, 2012 | Anaheim Convention Center; Anaheim, California | |
| March 29–31, 2013 | Anaheim Convention Center; Anaheim | |
| April 18–20, 2014 | Anaheim Convention Center; Anaheim | Tony Daniel, Jim Lee, Mark Waid |
| April 3–5, 2015 | Anaheim Convention Center; Anaheim | Neal Adams, Becky Cloonan, Sam de la Rosa, Steve Epting, Greg Horn, Phil Noto, Greg Weisman |
| March 25–27, 2016 | Los Angeles Convention Center; Los Angeles | Brian Michael Bendis, Amber Benson, Jason Faunt, Lou Ferrigno, Christopher Khayman Lee, Jim Lee, Humberto Ramos, John Romita, Jr., Bill Sienkiewicz, David Sobolov |
| March 31 – April 2, 2017 | Anaheim Convention Center; Anaheim | Sergio Aragonés, Kevin Eastman, Chad Hardin, Phil Jimenez, Jim Lee, Mark Waid |
| March 23–25, 2018 | Anaheim Convention Center; Anaheim | Sergio Aragonés, Larry Hama, Faith Erin Hicks, Jim Lee, Patrick Rothfuss, Gail Simone, Mark Waid |
| March 29–31, 2019 | Anaheim Convention Center; Anaheim | |
| ~~April 10–12, 2020~~ | Anaheim Convention Center; Anaheim | Canceled due to COVID-19 pandemic |
| ~~March 26–27, 2021~~ | Anaheim Convention Center; Anaheim | Canceled again due to COVID-19 pandemic |
| April 1–3, 2022 | Anaheim Convention Center; Anaheim | Rico E. Anderson, Michael Cho, Bobby Clark, Becky Cloonan, Tracee Lee Cocco, Michael W. Conrad, David Dastmalchian, Kevin Eastman, Ashley Eckstein, Mary Gibbs, Shannon Hale, Herbert Jefferson Jr., Neil Kaplan, Sarah Kuhn, Lex Lang, Cherami Leigh, Elliot S! Maggin, Deneen Melody, Amanda C. MIller, Trung Le Nguyen, David A. Robertson, Kevin Smith, Michael A. Stackpole, Babs Tarr, Larry Thomas, David F. Walker, Tula Lotay/Lisa Wood, Gene Luen Yang, Skottie Young |
| March 24–26, 2023 | Anaheim Convention Center; Anaheim | Jason Aaron, Alane Adams, Beau Billingslea, Steve Blum, Griffin Burns, Mingjue Helen Chen, Tom Cook, Ian James Corlett, Mark Evanier, Jenny Frison, Mitch Gerads, Kyle Herbert, Adam Hughes, Brian Hull, Phil Jimenez, Daniel Warren Johnson, Tom King, Jae Lee, Steve Leialoha, Mary Elizabeth McGlynn, Cynthia McWilliams, Annalee Newitz, Joe Ochman, Gary Phillips, Joe Quinones, Trina Robbins, Kaitlyn Robrock, James Rollins, Neil Ross, Tom Ruegger, Paul Rugg, Mark Russell, Evan "Doc" Shaner, Kaiji Tang, Greg van Eekhout, Marv Wolfman, Gene Luen Yang |
| March 29–31, 2024 | Anaheim Convention Center; Anaheim | Patrick Ballesteros, Irene Bedard, Susanne Blakeslee, Niketa Calame-Harris, Jeff Dekal, Colleen Doran, Ashley Eckstein, Grace Ellis, Steve Englehart, Mary Gibbs, Rachel Howzell Hall, Hugh Howey, Tony Isabella, Terry Kavanagh, Jae Lee, Jonathan Maberry, David W. Mack, Sarah Natochenny, Todd Nauck, Dustin Nguyen, Steve Oliff, Steve Orlando, Lisa Ortiz, Jimmie Robinson, Daniel Ross, Erica Schroeder, Stephen Silver, Gail Simone, Tracy Wolff, Marv Wolfman |
| March 28–30, 2025 | Anaheim Convention Center; Anaheim, Calif. | Denys Cowan, David Dastmalchian, Mark Evanier, Danny Fingeroth, Jessica Fong, Matt Forbeck, Mitch Gerads, Yaya Han, Derek Kirk Kim, Jim Lee, Todd McFarlane, Sam Maggs, Nicholas Meyer, Sean Murphy, Adam Nimoy, Neville Page, Brian Posehn, Darick Robertson, Dan Slott, Dan Veesenmeyer, Mark Waid |
| March 27–29, 2026 | Anaheim Convention Center; Anaheim, Calif. | Rico E. Anderson, Patrick Ballesteros, Gigi Banister, Eric Bauza, Ben Brode, Jamie Costa, Brittany Cox, Felicia Day, Mark Evanier, Sarah Gailey, Jenette Goldstein, Claudia Gray, Jasmine Guillory, Kendall Hale, Gloria Lynne Henry, Robin Hobb, Tini Howard, Willie Ito, Liana Kangas, Tom King, Crystal Lee, Joycelyn Lew, FM De Marco, Daniel Marin, Tohoru Masamune, James C. Mathis III, Piotr Michael, Candi Milo, Cassandra Lee Morris, Eliah Mountjoy, Minae Noji, Floyd Norman, Laura Post, Jordan Reynolds, Kaitlyn Robrock, Mark Rolston, William Salyers, Scott Snyder, Ash Sroka, Spenser Starke, Alpha Takahashi, Babs Tarr, Courtenay Taylor, Frank Todaro, Joshua Williamson |
| March 26–28, 2027 | Anaheim Convention Center; Anaheim, Calif. | |

== Features and events ==
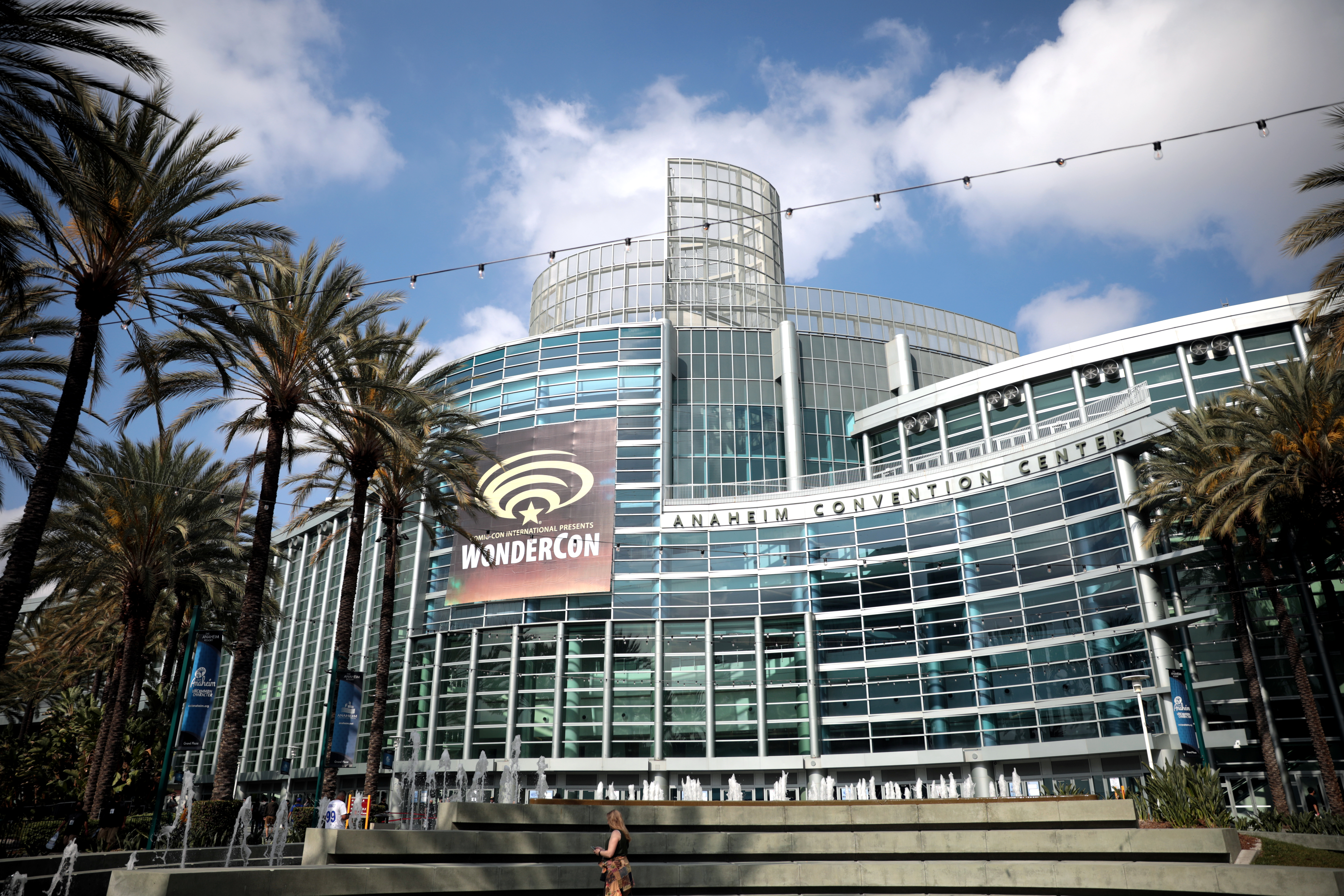
The exterior of WonderCon at the Anaheim Convention Center, April 2022

While the main attraction of WonderCon has always been various retailers selling back issues of comic books and action figures, the exhibitor list has grown to include retailers of specialty DVDs. There is also an "Artists Alley" featuring mainly comic book artists selling artwork, signing books, and doing sketches; and mainstream celebrities signing autographed pictures.

WonderCon hosted the Harvey Awards ceremonies from 1997 to 1999. Since 2007, academicians and comic industry professionals have held the Comics Arts Conference in conjunction with WonderCon. In addition, WonderCon features "Trailer Park", an event where trailers for upcoming films are shown. The WonderCon masquerade competition usually takes place on Saturday after the convention closes. Awards are given to those with the most creative performances, though anyone can participate.
