= Monsters, Inc. =

2001 film by Pete Docter

- Theatrical release poster
- Directed by: Pete Docter
- Screenplay by: Andrew Stanton; Daniel Gerson
- Story by: Pete Docter; Jill Culton; Jeff Pidgeon; Ralph Eggleston
- Produced by: Darla K. Anderson
- Starring: John Goodman; Billy Crystal; Steve Buscemi; James Coburn; Jennifer Tilly; Mary Gibbs
- Edited by: Robert Grahamjones; Jim Stewart
- Music by: Randy Newman
- Production company: Pixar Animation Studios
- Distributed by: Buena Vista Pictures Distribution (Note: Distributed under the Walt Disney Pictures banner. The 2012 reissue was distributed under its current name, Walt Disney Studios Motion Pictures.)
- Release dates: October 28, 2001 (El Capitan Theatre); November 2, 2001 (United States)
- Running time: 92 minutes
- Country: United States
- Language: English
- Budget: $115 million
- Box office: $579.7 million

Monsters, Inc. is a 2001 American animated fantasy comedy film directed by Pete Docter, and written by Andrew Stanton and Daniel Gerson. Produced by Pixar Animation Studios for Walt Disney Pictures, the film stars the voices of John Goodman, Billy Crystal, Steve Buscemi, James Coburn, Jennifer Tilly, and Mary Gibbs. It centers on two monsters, the hairy James P. "Sulley" Sullivan (Goodman) and his one-eyed partner and best friend Mike Wazowski (Crystal), who are employed at the titular energy-producing factory Monsters, Inc., which generates power by scaring human children. However, the monster world believes that children are toxic, and when a little human girl, Boo (Gibbs), sneaks into the factory, the duo must safely return her home while evading discovery.

Docter began developing the film in 1996, following an idea conceived in 1994 when Toy Story (1995) was nearing completion, and wrote the story with Jill Culton, Jeff Pidgeon, and Ralph Eggleston, while Stanton wrote the screenplay with Gerson. The characters went through many incarnations over the film's five-year production process. The technical team and animators found new ways to simulate fur and cloth realistically for the film. Randy Newman, who composed the music for Pixar's three prior films, returned to compose the score for its fourth.

Monsters, Inc. premiered at the El Capitan Theatre in Los Angeles on October 28, 2001, and was released in theaters in the United States on November 2. Upon its release, it received critical acclaim and was a commercial success, grossing over $528 million worldwide to become the third-highest-grossing film of 2001. The film won the Academy Award for Best Original Song for "If I Didn't Have You" and was nominated for the inaugural award for Best Animated Feature, as well as Best Sound Editing and Best Original Score. Monsters, Inc. saw a 3D re-release in theaters in 2012. A prequel titled Monsters University, directed by Dan Scanlon, was released in 2013. A sequel series titled Monsters at Work premiered on Disney+ in 2021. A third film is in development.

== Plot ==
In a world inhabited entirely by monsters, the city of Monstropolis harnesses the screams of human children for energy. At the Monsters Incorporated factory, monsters employed as "scarers" enter the human world through special doors that become portals to children's bedroom closets. They then frighten the children to harvest their screams. As human children are rumored to be toxic enough to kill a monster through physical contact, this work is considered dangerous. Furthermore, children are becoming harder to scare, causing a decline in production and a subsequent energy crisis that greatly concerns Monsters Inc. CEO Henry J. Waternoose III.

One evening after work, top scarer James P. "Sulley" Sullivan returns to the Scare Floor to retrieve forgotten paperwork for his best friend and assistant Mike Wazowski, when he discovers that an active door has been left at the station of his rival, Randall Boggs. Upon inspecting the door, Sulley accidentally lets a toddler girl into the factory. Frightened, Sulley unsuccessfully tries to return the girl, who escapes into Monstropolis, interrupting Mike on a date at a sushi restaurant in the process. Chaos erupts when other monsters see the girl, prompting Sulley and Mike to escape with her as the Child Detection Agency (CDA) arrives and quarantines the restaurant. Forced to keep the girl hidden in their apartment for the night, Sulley and Mike learn that she is not toxic and that her laughter generates more energy than her screams.

The next day, Sulley and Mike disguise the girl as a monster and attempt to send her home. While Mike seeks out her door, Sulley starts to grow attached to the girl and nicknames her "Boo". Randall, waiting in Boo's room to ambush her, kidnaps Mike by accident and reveals his plan to kidnap children and cruelly force screams from them using a machine called the Scream Extractor. Sulley and Boo save Mike, and they go to the simulator room to alert Waternoose of Randall's plot. There, Waternoose makes Sulley give a scare demonstration to some new recruits, and Boo becomes frightened. While attempting to comfort her, Sulley notices images on the monitors depicting him scaring, making him question his line of work. Boo inadvertently reveals herself to Waternoose, who turns out to be in league with Randall; he abducts Boo and banishes Mike and Sulley to the Himalayas in the human world.

Mike and Sulley are found by the Abominable Snowman, who takes them to his lair. When he reveals a nearby village, Sulley hopes to use its closets to return to Monstropolis, but Mike, feeling betrayed, initially refuses to go with him. Sulley returns to the factory and rescues Boo from the Scream Extractor. Mike returns to reconcile with Sulley, and Randall pursues them through the enormous door vault as the trio searches for Boo's door. Randall eventually kidnaps Boo, but she overcomes her fear of him and helps Sulley defeat him; Mike and Sulley then banish Randall to the human world and destroy his corresponding door.

Just when Mike and Sulley locate Boo's door, Waternoose calls it down to the Scare Floor, intending to have the CDA arrest them. Mike distracts the CDA while Sulley and Boo lure Waternoose into the simulator room. Sulley tricks Waternoose into revealing his plan to kidnap hundreds of children to save the company and solve the energy crisis, while Mike records the conversation and replays it to the CDA, who promptly arrest Waternoose. Scare Floor administrator Roz then reveals herself as an undercover CDA agent, and allows Sulley to send Boo home, but orders her door to be shredded.

Sometime later, Sulley retools the factory to harvest children's laughter rather than screams, since laughter is ten times more powerful. With the energy crisis solved, Sulley becomes the new CEO of Monsters Inc., while Mike becomes the company's top comedian. Mike then reveals to Sulley that he has painstakingly rebuilt Boo's door, allowing Sulley to reunite with Boo.

== Voice cast ==
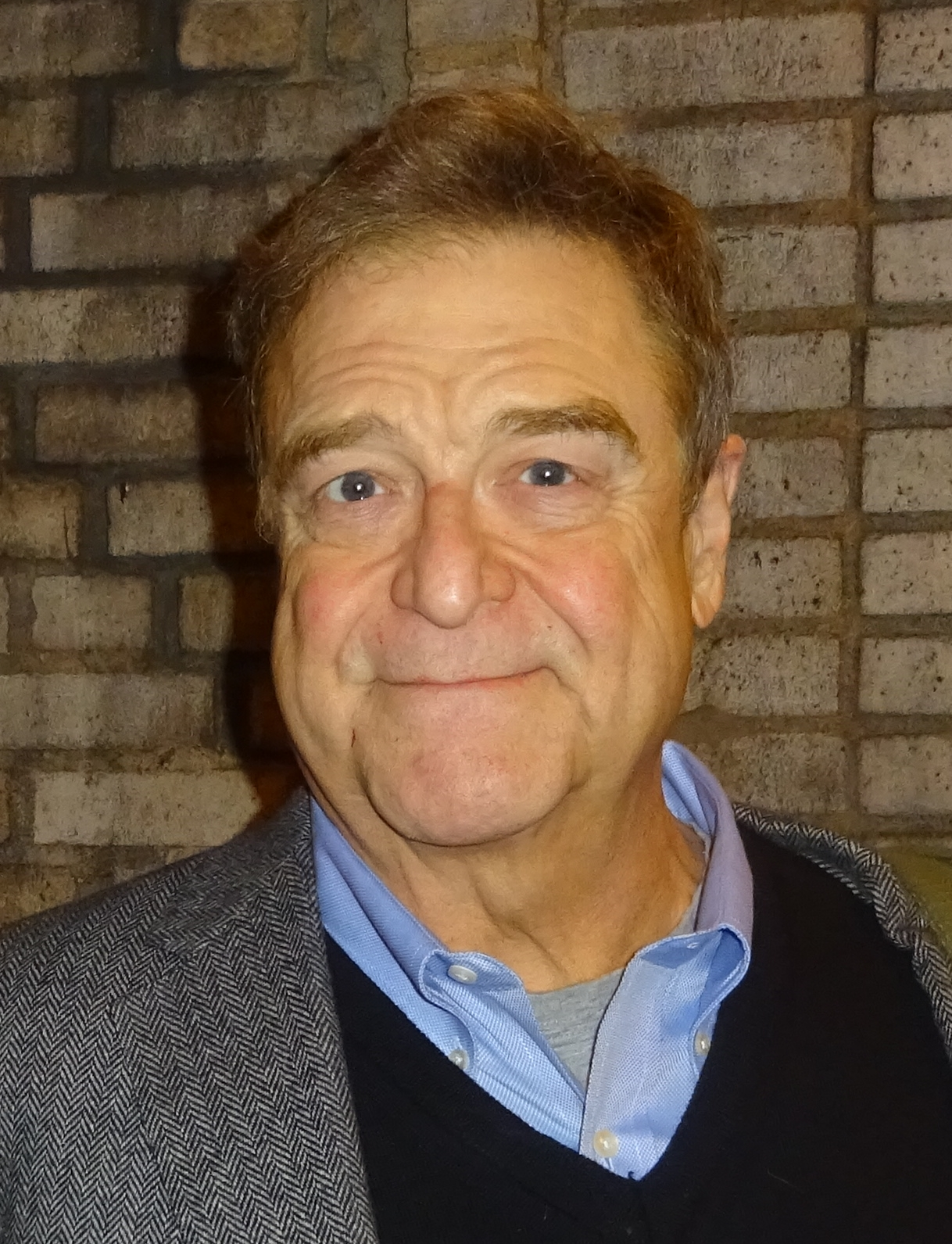
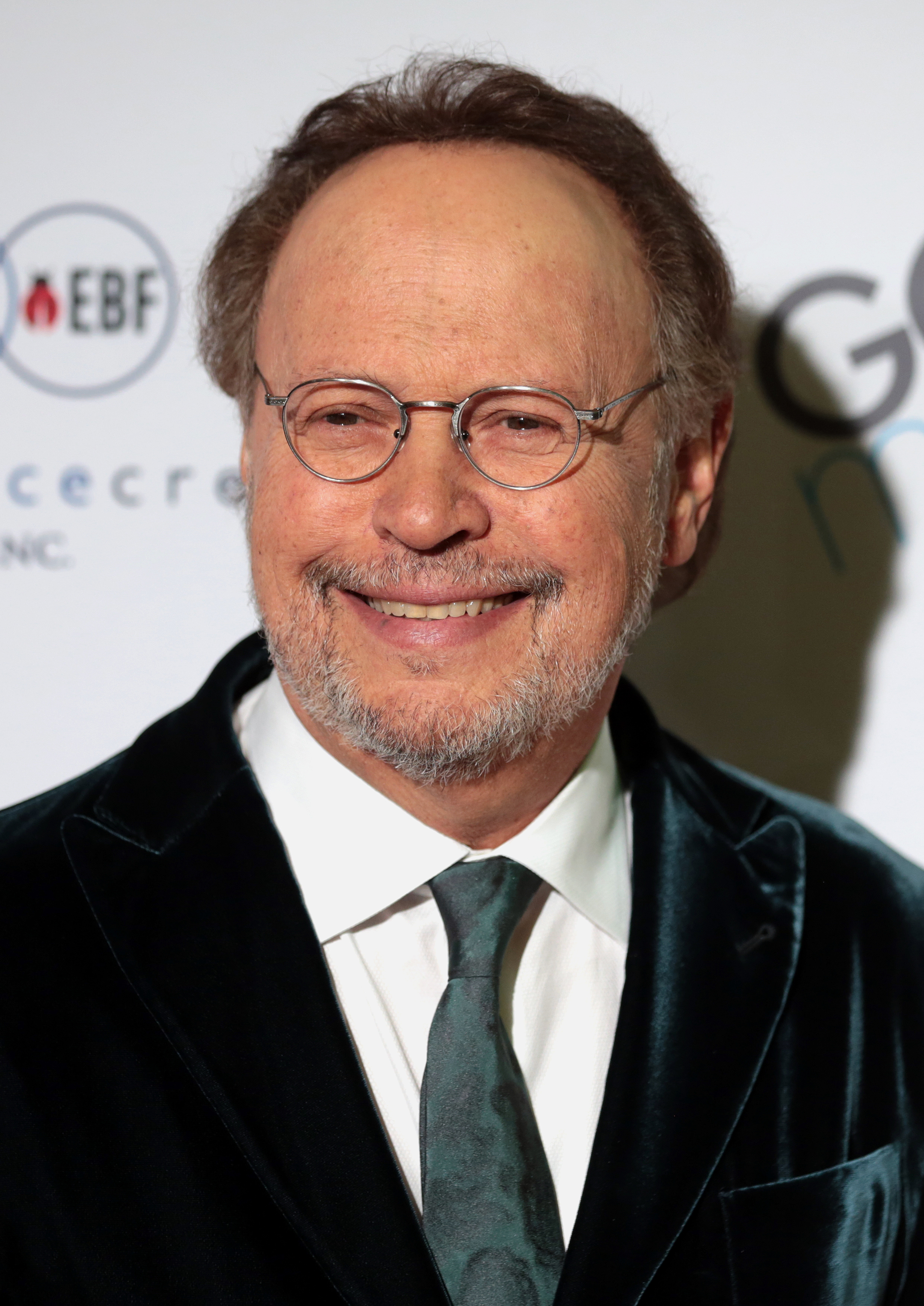
(Left-to-Right) John Goodman (pictured in 2016), and Billy Crystal (2018) lend their voices to Sulley and Mike
- John Goodman as James P. "Sulley" Sullivan, a huge, intimidating but well-meaning scarer at Monsters, Inc. At the film's beginning, he has been the "Best Scarer" at Monsters, Inc. for several months running.
- Billy Crystal as Mike Wazowski, a short, one-eyed scarer assistant who is Sulley's best friend, roommate, and coworker. He is charming and generally the more organized of the two, but he is prone to neurotics, and his ego sometimes leads him astray.
- Mary Gibbs as Boo, a three-year-old human girl who is unafraid of any monster except Randall, the scarer assigned to her door. She believes Sulley is a large cat and refers to him as "Kitty". The book based on the film gives Boo's "real" name as Mary Gibbs, the name of her voice actress, who is also the daughter of one of the film's story artists, Rob.
  - Gibbs was so young during production that most of her lines were captured via real or simulated play scenarios designed to elicit the required audio reactions, rather than any traditional line work, including being followed around the Pixar office with a microphone by the crew.
- Steve Buscemi as Randall Boggs, a snide and preening monster with a chameleon-like ability to change his skin color and blend in completely with his surroundings, who makes himself a rival to Sulley and Mike in the scream collection.
- James Coburn as Henry J. Waternoose, the CEO of Monsters, Inc., a job passed down through his family for three generations. He would later work in secret with Randall amidst the energy crisis.
- Jennifer Tilly as Celia Mae, a receptionist for Monsters, Inc. and Mike's girlfriend.
- Bob Peterson as Roz, the administrator for Scare Floor F, where Sulley, Mike, and Randall work. She is secretly the "Number One" of the CDA, operating undercover inside Monsters, Inc.
- John Ratzenberger as Yeti a.k.a. The Abominable Snowman, a former Monsters, Inc. employee who was banished to the Himalayas. His appearance is based on that of the Abominable Snowman in the 1964 Rankin/Bass animated special Rudolph the Red-Nosed Reindeer.
- Frank Oz as Fungus, Randall's beleaguered assistant.
- Daniel Gerson as Needleman and Smitty, two small janitor monsters who idolize Sulley and operate the Door Shredder when required.
- Steve Susskind as Jerry, a good friend of Waternoose who manages Scare Floor F.
- Bonnie Hunt as Flint, a talent recruiter who trains new monsters to scare children.
- Jeff Pidgeon as Bile, an accident-prone trainee scarer for Monsters, Inc.
- Sam Black as George Sanderson, a scarer at Monsters, Inc. In a running gag throughout the film, he repeatedly makes contact with objects from the human world, resulting in CDA agents tackling him, shaving his entire body, and sterilizing him.

== Production ==
=== Development ===
The idea for Monsters, Inc., along with ideas that would eventually become A Bug's Life, Finding Nemo, and WALL-E, was conceived in a lunch in 1994 attended by John Lasseter, Pete Docter, Andrew Stanton, and Joe Ranft near the completion of Toy Story. One of the ideas that came out of the brainstorming session was a film about monsters. "When we were making Toy Story", Docter said, "everybody came up to me and said, 'Hey, I totally believed that my toys came to life when I left the room.' So when Disney asked us to do some more films, I wanted to tap into a childlike notion that was similar to that. I knew monsters were coming out of my closet when I was a kid. So I said, 'Hey, let's do a film about monsters.'"

Docter began work on the film that would become Monsters, Inc. in 1996, while others focused on A Bug's Life (1998) and Toy Story 2 (1999). Its code name was Hidden City, after Docter's favorite restaurant in Point Richmond. By early February 1997, Docter, together with Harley Jessup, Jill Culton, and Jeff Pidgeon, had drafted a treatment that bore some resemblance to the final film. Docter pitched the story to Disney with some initial artwork on February 4 that year. He and his story team left with some suggestions in hand and returned to pitch a refined version of the story on May 30. At this pitch meeting, longtime Disney animator Joe Grant – whose work stretched back to Snow White and the Seven Dwarfs (1937) – suggested the title Monsters, Inc., a play on the title of the gangster film Murder, Inc. (1960), and the name stuck. The film would be the first Pixar feature not directed by Lasseter, helmed instead by Docter, as well as Lee Unkrich and David Silverman, who served as co-directors.

=== Writing ===
The storyline took on many forms during production. Docter's original idea featured a 30-year-old man dealing with monsters that he drew in a book as a child coming back to bother him as an adult. Each monster represented a fear he had, and conquering those fears eventually caused the monsters to disappear. Docter later scrapped this concept, and instead decided on a buddy story between a monster and a child titled simply Monsters, in which the monster character of Sulley (known at this stage as Johnson) was an up-and-comer at his workplace, where the company's purpose was to scare children. Sulley's eventual sidekick, Mike Wazowski, had not yet been added.

Between 1996 and 2000, the lead monster and child went through radical changes as the story evolved. As the story continued to develop, the child varied in age and gender. Ultimately, the story team decided that a girl would be the best counterpart for a furry, 8-foot-tall (2.4 m) co-star. After a girl was settled upon, the character continued to undergo changes, at one point being from Ireland and at another time being African American. Originally, the character of the little girl, known as Mary, became a fearless seven-year-old toughened by years of teasing and pranks from four older brothers. In stark contrast, Johnson is nervous about the possibility of losing his job after the boss at Monsters, Inc. announces a downsizing. He feels envious because another scarer, Ned (who later became Randall), is the company's top performer. Through various drafts, Johnson's occupation went back and forth between scarer and some other position such as a janitor or a refinery worker, until his final incarnation as the best scarer at Monsters, Inc.

Throughout development, Pixar worried that having a main character whose main goal was to scare children would alienate audiences and make them not empathize with him. Docter would later describe that the team "bent over backwards trying to create a story that still had monsters" while still attempting to solve the problem. A key moment came when the team decided, "Okay, he's the BEST scarer there. He's the star quarterback", with Docter noting that before that moment "design after design, we really didn't know what he was about." Disney noted to Pixar early on that they did not want the character to "look like a guy in a suit". To this end, Johnson was originally planned to have tentacles for feet; however, this caused many problems in early animation tests. The idea was later largely rejected, as it was thought that audiences would be distracted by the tentacles. Mary's age also differed from draft to draft until the writers settled on the age of three. "We found that the younger she was, the more dependent she was on Sulley", Docter said. Eventually, Johnson was renamed Sullivan. Sullivan was also planned to wear glasses throughout the film. However, the creators abandoned this idea as they found the eyes were a perfectly readable and clear way of expressing a character's personality.

The idea of a monster buddy for the lead monster emerged at a "story summit" in Burbank with employees from Disney and Pixar, held on April 6, 1998. A term coined by Lasseter, a "story summit" was a crash exercise that would yield a finished story in only two days. The group agreed that a buddy character would give the lead monster someone to talk to about his predicament. Development artist Ricky Nierva drew a concept sketch of a rounded, one-eyed monster as a concept for the character, and everyone was generally receptive to it. Docter named the character Mike, after the father of his friend Frank Oz, a director and Muppet performer (and the voice of Fungus). Jeff Pidgeon and Jason Katz story-boarded a test in which Mike helps Sulley choose a tie for work, and Mike Wazowski soon became a vital character in the film. Originally, Mike had no arms and had to use his legs as appendages; however, due to some technical difficulties, arms were soon added to him.

Screenwriter Daniel Gerson joined Pixar in 1999 and worked daily on the film with the filmmakers for almost two years. He considered it his first experience in writing a feature film. He explained, "I would sit with Pete [Docter] and David Silverman and we would talk about a scene and they would tell me what they were looking for. I would make some suggestions and then go off and write the sequence. We'd get together again and review it and then hand it off to a story artist. Here's where the collaborative process really kicked in. The board artist was not beholden to my work and could take liberties here and there. Sometimes, I would suggest an idea about making the joke work better visually. Once the scene moved on to animation, the animators would plus the material even further."

Docter has cited the 1973 film Paper Moon as inspiration for the concept of someone experiencing getting stuck with a kid who turns out to be the real expert, and he credits Lasseter for coming up with the "laughter is ten times more powerful than fear" concept.

=== Casting ===
Bill Murray was considered for the voice role of Sulley. He screen-tested for the role and was interested, but Docter was unable to make contact with him to formally offer the part. The voice role of Sulley eventually went to John Goodman, the longtime co-star of the comedy series Roseanne and a regular in the films of the Coen brothers. Goodman interpreted the character as the monster equivalent of a National Football League player. "He's like a seasoned lineman in the tenth year of his career," he said at the time. "He is totally dedicated and a total pro." Billy Crystal, having regretted turning down the part of Buzz Lightyear in Toy Story (1995) years prior, immediately accepted the role of Mike, which went on to become his favorite role.

=== Animation ===
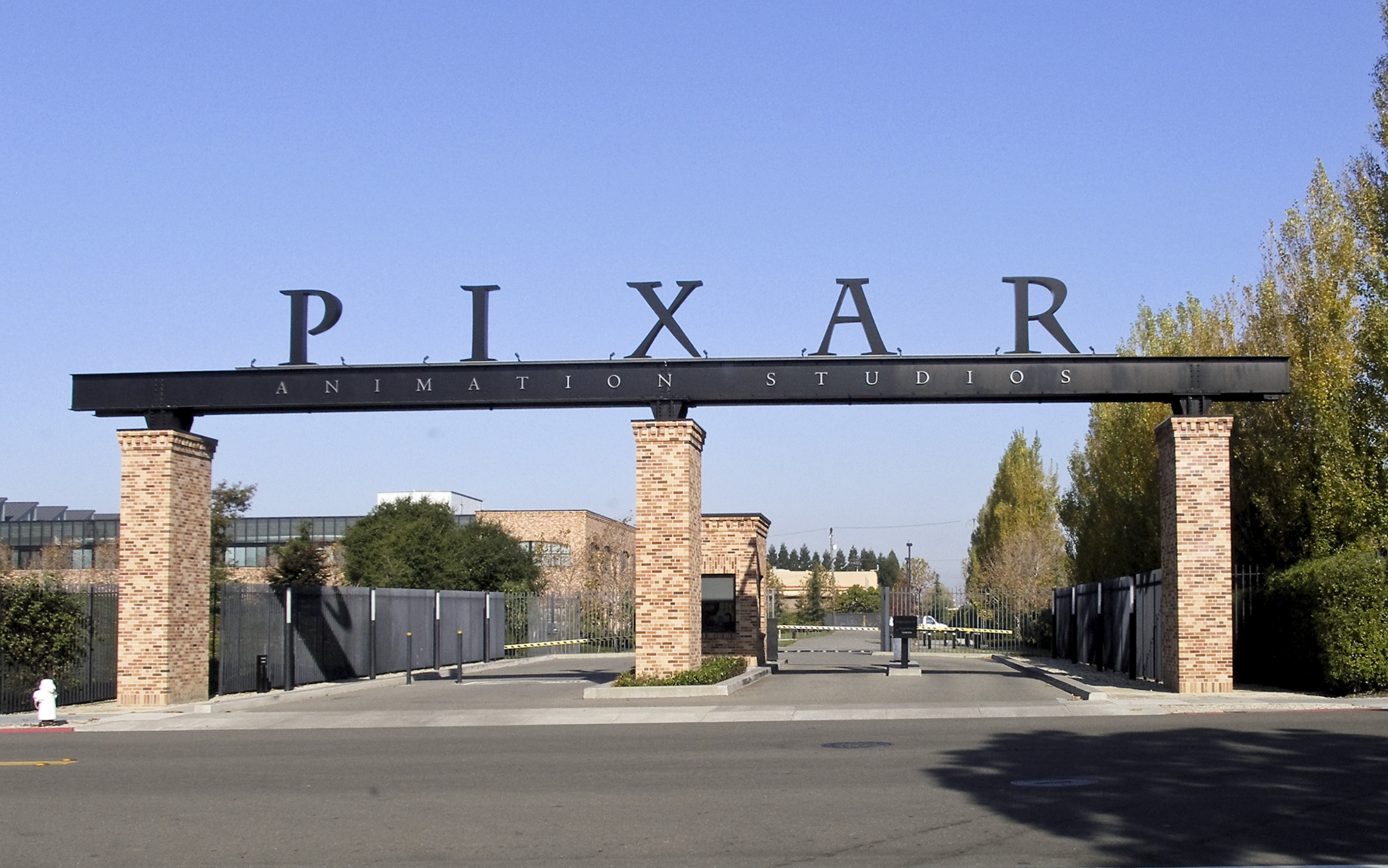
When production began in earnest on Monsters, Inc. in 2000, Pixar relocated to a larger building in Emeryville, California.

In November 2000, early in the production of Monsters, Inc., Pixar packed up and moved for the second time after its Lucasfilm Ltd. years. The company's 500 employees had become spread among three buildings, separated by a busy highway. The company moved from Point Richmond to a much bigger campus in Emeryville, co-designed by Lasseter and Steve Jobs.

In production, the film differed from earlier Pixar features, as every main character had its own lead animator: John Kahrs on Sulley, Andrew Gordon on Mike, and Dave DeVan on Boo. Kahrs found that the "bearlike quality" of Goodman's voice provided an exceptionally good fit with the character. He faced a difficult challenge, however, in dealing with Sulley's sheer mass; traditionally, animators conveyed a figure's heaviness by giving it a slower, more belabored movement, but Kahrs was concerned that such an approach to a central character would give the film a "sluggish" feel. Like Goodman, Kahrs came to think of Sulley as a football player whose athleticism enabled him to move quickly in spite of his size. To help the animators with Sulley and other large monsters, Pixar arranged for Rodger Kram, a University of California, Berkeley expert on the locomotion of heavy mammals, to lecture on the subject.

Adding to Sulley's lifelike appearance was an intense effort by the technical team to refine the rendering of fur. Other production houses had tackled realistic fur, most notably Rhythm & Hues Studios (R&H) in its 1993 polar bear commercials for Coca-Cola and in its talking animals' faces in the 1995 film Babe. However, rendering the characters of Monsters, Inc. required fur on a much larger scale. From the standpoint of Pixar's engineers, the quest for fur posed several significant challenges; one was to figure out how to animate a large number of hairs – 2,320,413 of them on Sulley – in a reasonably efficient way, and another was to make sure that the hairs cast shadows on other ones. Without self-shadowing, either fur or hair takes on an unrealistic flat-colored look (e.g., in Toy Story, the hair on Andy's toddler sister, as seen in that movie's opening sequence, is hair without self-shadowing).

The first fur test featured Sulley running an obstacle course. High motion caused objects to catch and stretch the fur, yielding poor results. Another similar test was also unsuccessful, because, this time, the fur went through the objects. Pixar then set up a Simulation department and created a new fur simulation program called "Fizt" (short for "physics tool"). After a shot with Sulley in it had been animated, the department took the data for that shot and added Sulley's fur. Fizt allowed the fur to react in a more natural way. Every time when Sulley had to move, his fur automatically reacted to his movements, thus taking the effects of wind and gravity into account as well. The Fizt program was also used to control the movement of Boo's clothes, which provided another "breakthrough". The deceptively simple-sounding task of animating cloth was a challenge because of the hundreds of creases and wrinkles that occur in clothing when the wearer moves. The team also had to solve the problem of how to keep clothes from passing through itself when parts of it intersect. Fizt applied the same system to Boo's clothes as to Sulley's fur. Boo was first animated shirtless; the Simulation department then used Fizt to apply the shirt over Boo's body, allowing her clothes to react to her movements in a more natural manner.

The "door vault" scene is one of the film's most elaborate sets.

To solve the problem of cloth-to-cloth collisions, Michael Kass, Pixar's senior scientist, was joined on Monsters, Inc. by David Baraff and Andrew Witkin and developed an algorithm they called "global intersection analysis" to handle the problem. The complexity of the shots in the film, including elaborate sets such as the door vault, required more computing power to render than any of Pixar's earlier efforts combined. The render farm in place for Monsters, Inc. was made up of 3500 Sun Microsystems processors, compared with 1,400 for Toy Story 2 and only 200 for Toy Story, both built on Sun's own RISC-based SPARC processor architecture.

The scene in which the Harryhausen's restaurant was decontaminated was originally going to feature the restaurant being blown up. Due to the September 11 attacks, the explosion was replaced by a plasma dome.

== Music ==
Randy Newman composed the score for Monsters, Inc. as his fourth feature film collaboration with Pixar. The end credits song "If I Didn't Have You" was sung by John Goodman and Billy Crystal.

The album was nominated for the Academy Award for Best Original Score and a Grammy Award for Best Score Soundtrack for Visual Media. The score lost both these awards to The Lord of the Rings: The Fellowship of the Ring, but after sixteen nominations, the song "If I Didn't Have You" finally won Newman his first Academy Award for Best Original Song. During his acceptance speech, he said "I don't want your pity". It also won a Grammy Award for Best Song Written for Visual Media.

== Release ==
=== Marketing ===
In October 2000, a teaser trailer of Monsters, Inc. was released, being distributed online and included on home video releases of Toy Story 2. This trailer would be attached to 102 Dalmatians theatrically and can later be seen on the DVD release of The Emperor's New Groove, which was released on May 1, 2001. Another Monsters, Inc. trailer premiered in theaters in June 2001 with the release of Atlantis: The Lost Empire.

Several Happy Meal toys based on the film were released by McDonald's. Meanwhile, Hasbro debuted their own Monsters, Inc. toys at the North American International Toy Fair event.

=== Theatrical ===
The film premiered on October 28, 2001, at the El Capitan Theatre in Hollywood, California. It was theatrically released on November 2, 2001 in the United States, along with Domestic Disturbance and The One. This was followed by its opening in Australia on December 26, 2001, and in the United Kingdom on February 8, 2002. The theatrical release was accompanied by the Pixar short animated film For the Birds.

As with A Bug's Life and Toy Story 2, a montage of "outtakes" and a performance of a play based on a line from the film were made and included in the end credits of the film starting on December 7, 2001.

After the success of the 3D re-release of The Lion King, Disney and Pixar re-released Monsters, Inc. in 3D on December 19, 2012, after it was previously scheduled for January 18, 2013.

=== Home media ===
Monsters, Inc. was released on VHS and DVD on September 17, 2002. Both releases are THX certified and feature the animated shorts Mike's New Car and For the Birds. The DVD release presents the film in widescreen and fullscreen, both taken from the digital source by Pixar. The widescreen version additionally includes filmmakers' commentary and a sound effects-only audio track. The second disc includes a variety of bonus features including animated shorts, outtakes, and the "If I Didn't Have You" music video. This release set a new record for the highest single-day DVD sales, with 5 million copies being sold on its first day. Although this record was surpassed by Spider-Man two months later, the film continued to hold the highest single-day record for an animated movie until it was overtaken by Finding Nemo in 2003. The film was released on Blu-ray on November 10, 2009, and on Blu-ray 3D on February 19, 2013. While the 2009 Blu-ray release featured a 5.1 DTS-HD Master Audio surround sound track, the 2013 re-release and its 3D counterpart feature a 7.1 channel Dolby TrueHD track. Monsters, Inc. was released on 4K Blu-ray on March 3, 2020.

== Reception ==
=== Box office ===
On its first day of release, Monsters, Inc. earned $17.8 million, then generated $26.9 million the following day, making the latter the second-highest Saturday gross of all time, behind The Mummy Returns. It ranked number one at the box office upon opening, beating out K-PAX, Thirteen Ghosts, Domestic Disturbance, and The One. Monsters, Inc. set the record for having the biggest opening weekend of an animated film, making $62.6 million and surpassing the previous record held by Toy Story 2. This achievement would last for two years until the release of Finding Nemo in May 2003. The film was ranked as the biggest three-day opening weekend for a Disney film, dethroning Pearl Harbor. It was even the fourth film of the year to reach $60 million within its first three days of release, just after The Mummy Returns, Planet of the Apes, and Rush Hour 2. The film had a small drop-off of 27.2% over its second weekend, earning another $45.6 million, while also outgrossing Shallow Hal and Heist to remain at the top spot. In its third weekend, the film experienced a larger decline of 50.1%, placing itself in the second position behind Harry Potter and the Sorcerer's Stone. In its fourth weekend, however, there was an increase of 5.9%, making $24.1 million that Thanksgiving weekend for a combined five-day gross of $32.5 million, thus remaining in second place and edging out newcomers Spy Game, Black Knight, and Out Cold. As of May 2013, it is the eighth-biggest fourth weekend ever for a film.

The film made $289.9 million in North America, and $287.5 million in other territories, for a worldwide total of $577.4 milliom. The film is Pixar's ninth-highest-grossing film worldwide and sixth-highest in North America. For a time, the film surpassed Aladdin as the second-highest-grossing animated film of all time, only behind 1994's The Lion King.

In the United Kingdom, Ireland, and Malta, it earned £37.3 million ($53.3 million), marking the sixth-highest-grossing animated film of all time in the country and the 32nd-highest-grossing film of all time. For its opening weekend, it reached the number one spot at the box office ahead of Vanilla Sky and From Hell, collecting £4.7 million ($6.7 million). In Japan, although earning $4.5 million during its opening and ranking second behind The Lord of the Rings: The Fellowship of the Ring for the weekend, it moved to first place on subsequent weekends due to exceptionally small decreases or even increases and dominated for six weeks at the box office. It finally reached $74.4 million, standing as 2001's third-highest-grossing film and the third-largest U.S. animated feature of all time in the country behind Toy Story 3 and Finding Nemo.

=== Critical response ===
Review aggregator Rotten Tomatoes gave the film an approval rating of 96% based on 191 reviews, with an average rating of 8.1/10. The website's critical consensus reads, "Clever, funny, and delightful to look at, Monsters, Inc. delivers another resounding example of how Pixar elevated the bar for modern all-ages animation." Metacritic assigned the film a weighted average score of 79 out of 100 based on 35 critics, indicating "generally favorable" reviews. Audiences polled by CinemaScore gave the film a rare "A+" grade, becoming the second Pixar film to gain the score after Toy Story 2.

Charles Taylor of Salon magazine stated, "[i]t's agreeable and often funny, and adults who take their kids to see it might be surprised to find themselves having a pretty good time." Elvis Mitchell of The New York Times gave it a positive review, praising the film's usage of "creative energy", saying "There hasn't been a film in years to use creative energy as efficiently as Monsters, Inc." Although Mike Clark of USA Today thought the comedy was sometimes "more frenetic than inspired and viewer emotions are rarely touched to any notable degree", he also viewed the film as "visually inventive as its Pixar predecessors".

ReelViews film critic James Berardinelli gave the film 3 1/2 stars out of 4 and wrote that the film was "one of those rare family films that parents can enjoy (rather than endure) along with their kids". Roger Ebert of the Chicago Sun-Times gave the film 3 out of 4 stars, calling it "cheerful, high-energy fun, and like the other Pixar movies, has a running supply of gags and references aimed at grownups". Lisa Schwarzbaum of Entertainment Weekly gave the film a "B+" grade and praised its animation, stating "Everything from Pixar Animation Studios – the snazzy, cutting-edge computer animation outfit – looks really, really terrific and unspools with a liberated, heppest-moms-and-dads-on-the-block iconoclasm."

In 2025, it was one of the films voted for the "Readers' Choice" edition of The New York Times' list of "The 100 Best Movies of the 21st Century," finishing at number 242.

=== Accolades ===
Monsters, Inc. won the Academy Award for Best Original Song (Randy Newman, after fifteen previous nominations, for "If I Didn't Have You"). It was one of the first animated films to be nominated for Best Animated Feature. It was also nominated for Best Original Score and Best Sound Editing. At the Kid's Choice Awards in 2002, it was nominated for "Favorite Voice in an Animated Movie" for Billy Crystal (who lost to Eddie Murphy in Shrek).

== Lawsuits ==
A drawing of a character for Stanley Mouse's "Excuse My Dust", a film that he had tried to sell to Hollywood in 1998

Shortly before the film's release, Pixar was sued by children's songwriter Lori Madrid of Wyoming, claiming that the company had stolen her ideas from her 1997 poem "There's a Boy in My Closet". Madrid mailed her poem to six publishers in October 1999, notably Chronicle Books, before turning it into a local stage musical in August 2001. After seeing the trailer for Monsters, Inc., Madrid concluded that Chronicle Books had passed her work to Pixar and that the film was based on her work. In October 2001, she filed the suit against Chronicle Books, Pixar, and Disney in a federal court in Cheyenne, Wyoming. Her lawyer asked the court to issue a preliminary injunction, that would forbid Pixar and Disney from releasing the film while the suit was pending. In a hearing on November 1, 2001, the day before the film's scheduled release, the judge refused to issue an injunction. On June 26, 2002, he ruled that the film had nothing in common with the poem.

In November 2002, Stanley Mouse filed a lawsuit in which he alleged that the characters of Mike and Sulley were based on drawings of Excuse My Dust, a film that he had tried to sell to Hollywood in 1998. The lawsuit also stated that a story artist from Pixar visited Mouse in 2000 and discussed Mouse's work with him. A Disney spokeswoman responded, saying that the characters in Monsters, Inc. were "developed independently by the Pixar and Walt Disney Pictures creative teams, and do not infringe on anyone's copyrights". The case was ultimately settled under undisclosed terms.

== Further films ==
=== Prequel ===
A prequel, titled Monsters University, was released on June 21, 2013. John Goodman, Billy Crystal, and Steve Buscemi reprised their roles of Sulley, Mike, and Randall, while Dan Scanlon directed the film. The prequel's plot focuses on Sulley and Mike's studies at Monsters University, where they start off as rivals but soon become best friends.

=== Sequel ===
In March 2026, a third film was announced to be in development.

== Other media ==
An animated short, Mike's New Car, was made by Pixar in 2002 in which the two main characters have assorted misadventures with a car Mike has just bought. This film was not screened in theaters, but is included with all home video releases of Monsters, Inc., and on Pixar's Dedicated Shorts DVD. In August 2002, a manga version of Monsters, Inc. was made by Hiromi Yamafuji and distributed in Kodansha's Comic Bon Bon magazine in Japan; the manga was published in English by Tokyopop until it went out of print.

Feld Entertainment toured a Monsters, Inc. edition of their Walt Disney's World on Ice skating tour from 2003 to 2007. Monsters, Inc. has inspired three attractions at Disney theme parks around the world. In 2006 Monsters, Inc. Mike & Sulley to the Rescue! opened at Disneyland Resort's Disney California Adventure in Anaheim, California. In 2007, Monsters, Inc. Laugh Floor opened at Walt Disney World Resort's Magic Kingdom in Lake Buena Vista, Florida, replacing The Timekeeper. The show is improvisational in nature, and features the opportunity for Guests to interact with the monster comedians and submit jokes of their own via text message. In 2009, Monsters, Inc. Ride & Go Seek opened at Tokyo Disney Resort's Tokyo Disneyland in Chiba, Japan.

In 2009, Boom! Studios produced a Monsters Inc. comic book mini-series that ran for four issues. The storyline takes place after the movie and focuses on Sulley and Mike's daily struggles to operate Monsters Inc. on its new laughter-focused company policy. At the same time, their work is impeded by the revenge schemes of Randall and Waternoose, as well as a human child (indirectly revealed to be Sid Phillips from the Toy Story franchise) who has hijacked the company's closet door technology to commit a string of toy thefts throughout the human world.

=== Video games ===
A series of video games were created based on the film. The video games included Monsters, Inc., Monsters, Inc. Scream Team and Monsters, Inc. Scream Arena. A game titled Monsters, Inc. Run was released on the App Store for iPhone, iPod Touch, and iPad on December 13, 2012.

Sulley, Mike, Boo, Randall, Celia and Roz appear as playable characters in the video game Disney Magic Kingdoms, being unlocked during the progress of the game's main storyline.

A world based on the film made its debut appearance in the Kingdom Hearts series in Kingdom Hearts III, making it the second Disney-Pixar movie featured in the series after Toy Story. The world takes place after the events of the first film.

=== Television series ===
In November 2017, Disney CEO Bob Iger spoke about plans to develop a television series spin-off of Monsters, Inc. among other properties owned by the company. By November of the following year the series was confirmed for Disney+, and would continue the story of the previous films. On April 9, 2019, it was announced that Goodman, Crystal, and Tilly would return as Mike, Sulley, and Celia, respectively for the series. Peterson returns as Roz and also voices her twin sister Roze. Additional cast members include Ben Feldman as Tylor Tuskmon, Mindy Kaling as Val, Henry Winkler as Fritz, Lucas Neff as Duncan, Alanna Ubach as Cutter, Stephen Stanton as Needleman and Smitty (replacing Gerson), and Aisha Tyler as Tylor's mother Millie. In addition, Ratzenberger returns as Yeti and also voices Tylor's father Bernard. It was released on Disney+ on July 7, 2021. The series begins the day after Waternoose's arrest and follows Tylor who hopes to be promoted to the Laugh Floor.

== See also ==
- List of animated feature films
- List of computer-animated films

== Bibliography ==
- Price, David (2008). The Pixar Touch. New York: Alfred A. Knopf. ISBN 978-0-307-26575-3.
