= Monsters, Inc. (video game) =

2001 video game

- North American PlayStation 2 cover art
- Developers: Vicarious Visions (Game Boy Color); Natsume (Game Boy Advance); Kodiak Interactive (PlayStation 2)
- Publishers: THQ (Game Boy Color, Game Boy Advance); Sony Computer Entertainment (PlayStation 2)
- Platforms: Game Boy Color, Game Boy Advance, PlayStation 2
- Release: Game Boy Color, Game Boy Advance; NA: October 26, 2001; EU: February 1, 2002; PlayStation 2; NA: March 20, 2002
- Genre: Platform
- Mode: Single-player

Monsters, Inc. is a 2001 platform video game based on the film of the same name. It was released for Game Boy Color, Game Boy Advance, and PlayStation 2. The Game Boy Color and Game Boy Advance versions were released on October 26, 2001 in North America and on February 1, 2002 in Europe. The PlayStation 2 version was only released in North America on March 20, 2002.

== Gameplay ==
=== PlayStation 2 version ===
Monsters, Inc. is a 3D platformer. Players control James P. "Sulley" Sullivan through 8 levels based on environments from the movie, including the scream factory Monsters Incorporated, the streets of Monstropolis, Sulley's apartment, the Himalayas, and more. In each level, the main goals might include picking up one or more special items, or finding the exit. Sulley has to make his way across platforms, ladders and conveyor belts by jumping, climbing, flipping switches and pushing crates around. To attack enemies, Sulley can use his tail to whip opponents. The game has no lives system, so levels can be attempted an unlimited number of times.

Each level also includes a number of collectibles and special tasks. There are 100 discarded screams to pick up; finding a certain percentage of them unlocks mini-game bonus levels. There are also five scream canisters to find and a small challenge involving scaring five mice within a time limit. If both are completed, clips from the movie are unlocked.

== Reception ==
Reception

Aggregate scores
Aggregator	Score		
Aggregator	GBA	GBC	PS2
GameRankings	64%	63%	54%
Metacritic	57/100	N/A	55/100

Review scores
Publication	Score		
Publication	GBA	GBC	PS2
AllGame	N/A	N/A	2.5/5
Electronic Gaming Monthly	N/A	N/A	4.5/10
EP Daily	7/10	N/A	7.5/10
Famitsu	19/40	N/A	N/A
Game Informer	5/10	N/A	5/10
GameRevolution	N/A	N/A	C−
GameSpot	N/A	N/A	5.5/10
GameSpy	N/A	N/A	43%
GameZone	7.9/10	7/10	7.5/10
IGN	N/A	N/A	2.9/10
Nintendo Power	2.5/5	2.8/5	N/A
Official U.S. PlayStation Magazine	N/A	N/A	3.5/5

The Game Boy Advance and PlayStation 2 versions received "mixed" reviews according to the review aggregation website Metacritic. In Japan, where the former version was ported and published by Tomy on March 1, 2002, Famitsu gave it a score of 19 out of 40.

Douglass C. Perry of IGN called the gameplay of the latter console version "formulaic, obvious, and occasionally cute." Game Informer said of the same console version, "It's tough to be impressed by a game based on a Pixar movie, when it's a given Pixar's CG is 2,000 times better than anything a current game system could offer."

Andrei Allupului of PlanetPS2 was scathing toward the same console version, saying, "It's also not an overly difficult game, nor an overly long game, nor an overly attractive game, nor an overly fun game." Ryan Davis of GameSpot cited the issues of the same console version, saying that it "will likely bore the older players and frustrate the young."

Even with the mixed reviews, the Academy of Interactive Arts & Sciences nominated Monsters, Inc. for the "Console Family" award in 2002, which was ultimately given to Mario Party 3.
