= Monsters, Inc. Scream Team =

2001 video game

- North American PlayStation cover art
- Developer: Artificial Mind and Movement
- Publishers: Sony Computer Entertainment (PS, PS2); Disney Interactive (Windows)
- Producer: Martin Rhéaume
- Designer: David García
- Programmers: Stéphane Leblanc; Martin Ross; Saray Pech
- Artist: Avi Winkler
- Composers: Thomas Sohet; Pierre Roger
- Engine: RenderWare (PS2)
- Platforms: PlayStation, Windows, PlayStation 2
- Release: Windows: NA: October 29, 2001; EU: January 25, 2002; PlayStation: NA: November 6, 2001; EU: February 1, 2002; PlayStation 2: EU: February 1, 2002
- Genre: Platform
- Mode: Single-player

Monsters, Inc. Scream Team (released as Monsters, Inc. Scare Island in Europe and on PC in the United States) is a 2001 platform video game developed by Artificial Mind and Movement and published by Sony Computer Entertainment for the PlayStation and PlayStation 2 and Disney Interactive for Microsoft Windows. The game is based on the 2001 film Monsters, Inc.. In 2011, the game was made available on the PlayStation Store.

== Gameplay ==
The game begins with an orientation program hosted by Roz, who shows the monsters the basics of their training. The levels are divided among three training grounds located on Scare Island. With names hinting at the nature of their design, the Urban Training Grounds, Desert Training Grounds and Arctic Training Grounds contain four areas to be explored. Each region ranges in scenery from a city park to a frozen lake, and players can choose to play as either Sulley or Mike, with each monster having different moves and scare abilities. Each level's loading screen features a picture of either Mike or Sulley to show who is recommended for the level.

The objective of the game is to successfully scare all the robot children (known as "Nerves") on the island and graduate from monster training with top honors. This is accomplished by collecting bronze, silver and gold medals that are awarded throughout the game. The bronze medal is required to complete a level and can be obtained by scaring five Nerves; this also unlocks a short clip from the movie. A silver medal can be obtained by finding and collecting 10 "Monsters, Inc." Tokens scattered through a level. A gold medal can be obtained by scaring all eight Nerves in a level. Obtaining the four bronze medals in each training ground unlocks a hidden item that may help the player reach previously unreachable areas. There are also races with Randall Boggs, which when won, also unlocks a short clip from the movie.

Items used include Extra Try Tokens (which give extra lives to the player), Monsters, Inc. Tokens (which earn silver medals for every ten collected) and Primordial Ooze (the substance that gives the monsters their scare power). The random Bag O' Calories increases health, while mailboxes provide tips and information to assist the player. Nerves and items may be hidden, but can be discovered by searching in and around boxes and other objects.

== Plot ==
Mike and Sulley are hand-picked by Waternoose to go to Waternoose's private training facility, Scare Island, in order to train to become top scarers. Scaring human children serves the purpose of generating energy for the monsters' society. As explored in the movie, human children are believed to be highly dangerous, even toxic, to monsters. This is the cause for the game's setting being a simulation.

== Release ==
Information about the game was first released in August 2001 on the gaming website GameSpot.

== Reception ==
Reception

Aggregate score
Aggregator	Score		
Aggregator	PC	PS	PS2
Metacritic	N/A	65/100	N/A

Review scores
Publication	Score		
Publication	PC	PS	PS2
4Players	N/A	N/A	67%
AllGame	3/5	2/5	N/A
Game Informer	N/A	5/10	N/A
GameRevolution	N/A	C	N/A
GameSpot	N/A	5.4/10	N/A
GameZone	N/A	9/10	N/A
IGN	N/A	7.5/10	N/A
Jeuxvideo.com	N/A	12/20	12/20
MeriStation	6/10	7.5/10	5/10
Official U.S. PlayStation Magazine	N/A	3.5/5	N/A

According to Metacritic, the PlayStation version received "mixed" reviews.
