= Monsters, Inc. Scream Arena =

2002 video game

- North American box art
- Developer: Radical Entertainment
- Publisher: THQ
- Director: Tom Legal
- Producer: Cam Weber
- Designer: Pete Low
- Programmer: Scott Andrews
- Artist: Jeremy McCarron
- Composer: Marc Baril
- Platform: GameCube
- Release: NA: September 19, 2002; EU: April 11, 2003
- Genre: Sports
- Modes: Single-player, multiplayer

Monsters, Inc. Scream Arena is a 2002 sports video game developed by Radical Entertainment and published by THQ for the GameCube. The game is based on the 2001 film Monsters, Inc. and was released in North America on September 19, 2002, and in Europe on April 11, 2003.

== Plot ==
The game begins after the events of the film, with a cutscene where several monsters are trying to make a child laugh. When they fail, another monster has a ball thrown at them causing an uproar of laughter, causing their laugh power meter to increase. This sparks an idea to start a dodgeball war to keep the power running throughout the monster world.

== Gameplay ==
The gameplay consists of basic dodgeball matches, with simplistic controls aimed at a young audience. The game contains both a single-player mode and multi-player mode for up to four players. In both modes, the winner is the first monster to knock off the opponents. Each player's goal is to throw "laugh balls" at competing players, while doing this each monster will react differently upon contact. The ultimate goal is to knock off your opponent and fill the laughter canister with children's laughter first.

The game contains thirteen playable monsters, seven arenas, bonus stages, and unlockable mini-games. Playable monsters and stages are unlocked throughout the game's single-player mode. Each arena is based on a scene from the movie and has five different objectives, like obtaining the most points from pure hits, hitting targets, holding on a special ball longest, and more. "Laugh balls" have different traits and abilities, such as being fast, slow, sticky and explosive.

The game contains a variety of modes and rulesets, including:

- Whoever gets hit the fewest times wins the round.
- Hit the targets that appear in the room the most to win.
- The player who is able to hold the special ball the longest before another player knocks it out of their hands wins.
- The team who has the fewest balls on their side of the room wins.

== Reception ==
Reception

Aggregate score
Aggregator	Score
Metacritic	39/100

Review scores
Publication	Score
Game Informer	5/10
IGN	2.5/10
Jeuxvideo.com	10/20
Nintendo Power	3.2/5

The game received "unfavorable" reviews according to the review aggregation website Metacritic. Game Informer rated it a 5 out of 10, stating that it had "little else to it other than chucking balls at opponents in various settings." Game Informer noted that the game "replicates the movie's charm wonderfully, but its lack of variety hardly qualifies it even as a game." Fran Mirabella III of IGN, who rated it a 2.5 out of 10, called the game "nothing more than basic dodgeball -- the kind you used to play in the schoolyard -- in a shiny Disney/Pixar package." Mirabella noted the game's young target audience and simplistic gameplay, calling it "mind-numbingly and laughably boring." Mirabella did praise the game's soundtrack as "splendid". Four out of five reviewers in Nintendo Power rated the game three-and-a-half out of five whereas the remaining reviewer rated it two out of five.
