= Jordan Nagai =

American child voice actor (born 2000)

- Born: February 5, 2000 (age 26); Los Angeles, California, U.S.
- Education: Washington University in St. Louis
- Occupation: Voice actor
- Years active: 2009

Jordan Nagai (born February 5, 2000) is an American retired child voice actor. He is best known for his voice role as Russell in Up.

== Career ==
Nagai's older brother, Hunter, originally auditioned for Russell in Up. Director Pete Docter has said, "As soon as Jordan's voice came on we started smiling because he is appealing and innocent and cute and different from what I was initially thinking." About 400 children had shown up for the auditions, but Nagai stood out because he would not stop talking the whole time. Nevertheless, Nagai was sometimes very shy, and Docter found it difficult getting him to recite all of his lines. Nagai's character in Up is the first Asian American figure in a movie by Pixar. Other than the movie, Nagai voiced Russell in all other media released in 2009 except for the short George and A.J., which featured Peter Sohn. In 2021, previously unused recordings from Nagai's earlier sessions were used for Russell in an episode of the television series Dug Days.

Nagai also lent his voice to an episode of The Simpsons called "O Brother, Where Bart Thou?" as the voice of Charlie, an orphan who befriends Bart in his quest for a baby brother. The program aired on December 13, 2009. Since retiring from acting, Nagai has opted to pursue a career in biology and healthcare management.

== Filmography ==
Year	Title	Role	Notes
2009	Up	Russell	Feature film; voice
2009	Up (video game)	Russell	Video game; voice
2009	Up: Upisodes	Russell	Miniseries; voice; 3 episodes
2009	Dug's Special Mission	Russell	Short film; voice; uncredited
2009	Schoolhouse Rock!	Additional voices	Television series; voice; 12 episodes
2009	The Simpsons	Charlie	Television series; voice; episode: "O Brother, Where Bart Thou?"
2021	Dug Days	Russell	Television series; episode: "Science"; voice; archive recordings

== Awards and nominations ==
- 2010 Breakout Performance Award, from the East West Players
