= Pete Docter =

American filmmaker (born 1968)

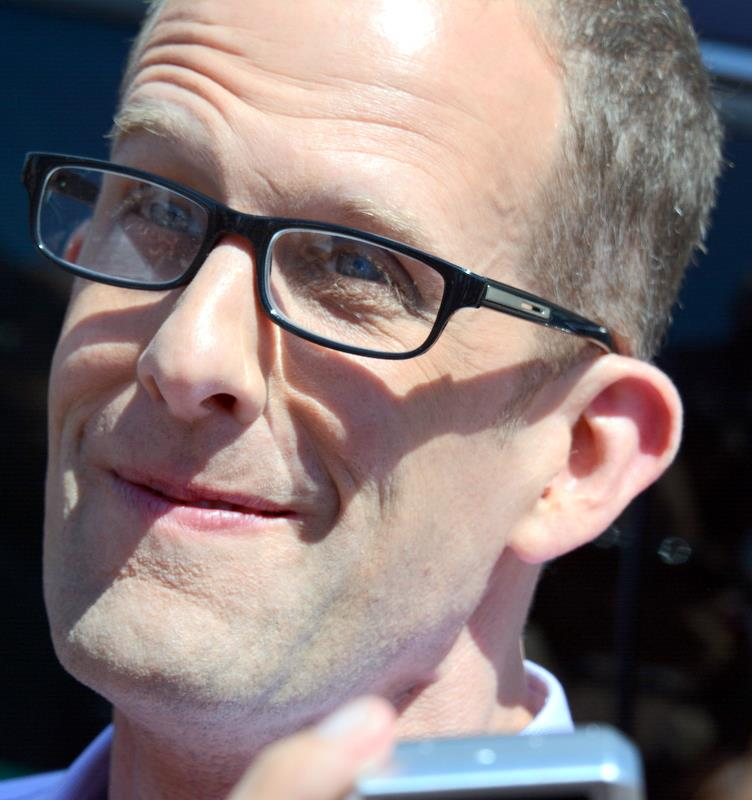
- Docter at the 2015 Cannes Film Festival
- Born: Peter Hans Docter; October 9, 1968 (age 58); Bloomington, Minnesota, U.S.
- Education: California Institute of the Arts (BFA)
- Occupations: Film director; screenwriter; producer; animator; voice actor
- Years active: 1985–present
- Employer: Pixar Animation Studios (1990–present)
- Known for: Monsters, Inc. (2001); Up (2009); Inside Out (2015); Soul (2020)
- Spouse: Amanda Docter
- Children: 2
- Awards: Academy Award for Best Animated Feature

Peter Hans Docter (born October 9, 1968) is an American filmmaker and animator. He has served as chief creative officer (CCO) of Pixar since 2018. Docter directed the company's animated films Monsters, Inc. (2001), Up (2009), Inside Out (2015), and Soul (2020). He was a writer and animator on Toy Story (1995) and also co-wrote Toy Story 2 (1999). From his nine Academy Award nominations, he is a record three-time recipient of Best Animated Feature for Up, Inside Out, and Soul. Docter has also won six Annie Awards from nine nominations, two Critics' Choice Awards, a BAFTA Award, a Satellite Award, and a Hochi Film Award. He has called himself a "geeky kid from Minnesota who likes to draw cartoons".

== Early life ==
Docter was born on October 9, 1968, in Bloomington, Minnesota, to Rita Margaret (Kanne) and David Reinhardt Docter. His mother's family is Danish American. He grew up introverted and socially isolated, preferring to work alone and having to remind himself to connect with others. He often played in the creek beside his house, pretending to be Indiana Jones and acting out scenes. A junior-high classmate later described him as "this kid who was really tall but who was kind of awkward, maybe getting picked on by the school bullies because his voice change at puberty was very rough."

Both his parents worked in education: his mother taught music and his father was a choral director and professor at Normandale Community College. Docter and his two sisters took music lessons at the MacPhail Center for Music, where they were taught the violin and viola in the Suzuki method. Unlike his two sisters—Kirsten, a violist and founding member of the Cavani String Quartet, and Kari, a cellist with the Metropolitan Opera—Docter was not particularly interested in music. He did not enjoy practicing, though he learned to play double bass and played with the orchestras on the soundtracks of Monsters, Inc. and Up.

Docter attended Nine Mile Elementary School, Oak Grove Junior High, and John F. Kennedy High School in Bloomington. He taught himself cartooning, making flip books and homemade animated shorts with a family movie camera. He later described his interest in animation as a way to "play God", making up nearly living characters. Cartoon director Chuck Jones, producer Walt Disney, and cartoonist Jack Davis were major inspirations.

He spent about a year at the University of Minnesota studying philosophy and making art before transferring to the California Institute of the Arts, where he won a Student Academy Award for his production "Next Door" and graduated in 1990 with a Bachelor of Fine Arts. Docter had planned to work for Walt Disney Animation Studios, but his best offers came from Pixar and the producers of The Simpsons. He did not think much of Pixar at the time, and later considered his choice to work there a strange and unusual one.

== Career ==
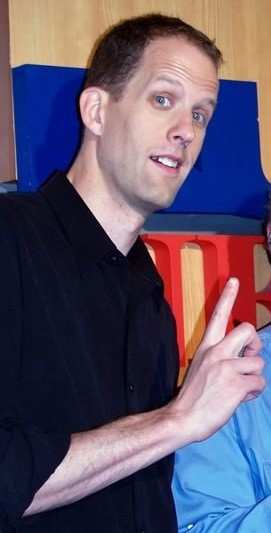
Docter in 2009 promoting the film Up

Before joining Pixar, Docter had created three short non-computer animations, Next Door, Palm Springs, and Winter. All three are preserved by the Academy Film Archive. Although he was a fan of Pixar's early short films, he knew little about the company. In a 2009 interview, he said: "Looking back, I kind of go, 'what was I thinking?'" He has said he had assumed he would be working on animated shorts but instead was assigned to animated commercials.

In 1990, at 21, Docter began working at Pixar after John Lasseter asked his former classmate, the late Joe Ranft—one of Docter's teachers at CalArts—to recommend promising students. Following his instincts and what "felt right" at the time, Docter accepted Pixar's offer and began work there the day after his college graduation as the company's animation group's tenth employee and third animator. Docter instantly felt at home in Pixar's tight-knit atmosphere. He has said: "Growing up ... a lot of us felt we were the only person in the world who had this weird obsession with animation. Coming to Pixar you feel like, 'Oh! There are others!'"

Docter had been brought in with limited responsibilities, but Lasseter quickly assigned him bigger roles in writing, animation, sound recording, and orchestra scoring. He was one of the three key screenwriters behind the concept of Toy Story, and partially based the character of Buzz Lightyear on himself. He had a mirror on his desk and made faces with it as he conceptualized the character.

Docter's fascination with character development was further influenced by a viewing of Paper Moon, he told journalist Robert K. Elder in an interview for The Film That Changed My Life.

I like the more character-driven stuff, and Paper Moon brought that home to me in a way that I had not seen in live action, really focusing on the whole story just about characters. It was almost theatrical in the same way you might see a stage show because you're locked in a room. It's got to be about characters, and yet it was so cinematic, a film that couldn't be done in any other medium. It just kind of blew my socks off.

Docter has been an integral part of some of Pixar's most seminal works, including Toy Story, Toy Story 2, A Bug's Life and Monsters, Inc., all of which received critical acclaim and honors. He contributed to these animated films as a co-author of the scripts, and worked with CGI stalwarts Lasseter, Ronnie del Carmen, Bob Peterson, Andrew Stanton, Brad Bird, and Joe Ranft. Docter has called his Pixar colleagues a bunch of "wild stallions". He is one of the five founding members of the Pixar Braintrust, which came together during the making of Toy Story (the others are Lasseter, Stanton, Ranft, and Unkrich).

Docter made his directorial debut with Monsters, Inc.—the first Pixar film not directed by Lasseter—right after the birth of his first child. He has said that the abrupt move from single-minded devotion to his career to parenting turned his life "upside down" and inspired the storyline. In 2004, Lasseter asked Docter to direct the English translation of Howl's Moving Castle. Docter then directed Up, released on May 29, 2009, to critical acclaim. He based its protagonist partially on himself, specifically his frequent feelings of social awkwardness and desire to get away from crowds to contemplate. After the success of Up, Docter, Lasseter, Stanton, Unkrich, and Bird received the Golden Lion Honorary Award for Lifetime Achievement at the 66th Venice International Film Festival. Docter directed the 2015 film Inside Out to critical acclaim. His next film, Soul, was released on Disney+ on December 25, 2020, to critical acclaim.

Docter appeared at Comic-Con 2008 and the 2009 WonderCon.

In 2009, Docter told Christianity Today that he had lived "a blessed life". The A.V. Club has called him "almost universally successful". He has been nominated for eight Oscars (winning three), three Annie Awards (winning two), four BAFTA Film Awards (winning two), a British Academy Children's Award (which he won), and a Hochi Film Award (which he won). Accepting his first Academy Award for Best Animated Feature, he said, "Never did I dream that making a flip book out of my third-grade math book would lead to this." Docter served as vice president of creativity at Pixar Animation Studios through 2018, and when Lasseter stepped down as chief creative officer, Docter took on the role. TheWrap reported that Docter planned to complete the film he began working on in 2016, which became Soul.

Docter received the Winsor McCay Award at the 2023 Annie Awards ceremony along with fellow animators Craig McCracken and Evelyn Lambart for his "unparalleled achievement and exceptional contributions to animation".

In a March 2026 interview, Docter defended the removal of the LGBTQ storyline from one of Pixar's films, Elio, including a reported scene where Elio imagined living with his male crush, saying "We're making a movie, not hundreds of millions of dollars in therapy" and asserting that Pixar had found that some parents did not want entertainment to pressure them into conversations they were not ready to have with their children. He called for extensive changes to the film, which were made by directors Madeline Sharafian and Domee Shi after the film's original director, Adrian Molina, left when the animation was mostly complete, leading to backlash among Pixar staff members. The San Francisco Chronicle reported that while Elio was being reworked, Docter ordered the removal of a transgender storyline from Win or Lose.

== Personal life ==
Docter is married to Amanda Docter and has two children, Nicholas and Elie. Elie has a speaking part in Up and inspired the character of Riley in Inside Out.

Docter has cited Frank Oz and Jim Henson as profound influences on his creative talents and career; Oz collaborated with Docter on Monsters, Inc., voicing a minor character.

Docter is a fan of anime, particularly the work of Hayao Miyazaki. He has said that Miyazaki's animation has "beautifully observed little moments of truth that you just recognize and respond to". He is also a fan of the filmography of DreamWorks. Of the competition, he has said: "I think it's a much healthier environment when there is more diversity".

In a 2009 interview, Docter said he is a Christian and that it influences his work, but did not envision himself ever making a Christian film. Of the relationship between his faith and his filmmaking, he has said:

I don't think people in any way, shape, or form like to be lectured to. When people go to a movie, they want to see some sort of experience of themselves on the screen. They don't come to be taught. So in that sense, and in terms of any sort of beliefs, I don't want to feel as though I'm ever lecturing or putting an agenda forth.

== Filmography ==
=== Films ===
Year	Title	Director	Writer	Animator	Executive Producer	Other	Voice Role	Notes
1995	Toy Story	No	Original Story	Supervising	No	Yes		Story Artist
1998	A Bug's Life	No	No	No	No	Yes		Additional Storyboarding
1999	Toy Story 2	No	Original Story	No	No	No		
2001	Monsters, Inc.	Yes	Original Story	Uncredited	No	Yes	CDA Agent 00002	
2003	Finding Nemo	No	No	No	No	No		Brain Trust, uncredited
2004	The Incredibles	No	No	No	No	Yes	Additional Voices	Brain Trust, uncredited
2005	Howl's Moving Castle	No	No	No	No	Yes		Director: English Dub, U.S. Version
2006	Cars	No	No	No	No	No		Brain Trust, uncredited
2007	Ratatouille	No	No	No	No	Yes		Pixar Productions
2008	WALL-E	No	Original Story	No	No	Yes	Additional Voices	Pixar Senior Creative Team - uncredited on Up and Inside Out
2009	Up	Yes	Yes	Uncredited	No	Yes	Campmaster Strauch, Kevin	Pixar Senior Creative Team - uncredited on Up and Inside Out
2010	Toy Story 3	No	No	No	No	Yes		Pixar Senior Creative Team - uncredited on Up and Inside Out
2011	Cars 2	No	No	No	No	Yes		Pixar Senior Creative Team - uncredited on Up and Inside Out
2012	Brave	No	No	No	Yes	Yes		Pixar Senior Creative Team - uncredited on Up and Inside Out
2013	Monsters University	No	No	No	Yes	Yes		Pixar Senior Creative Team - uncredited on Up and Inside Out
2015	Inside Out	Yes	Yes	No	No	Yes	Dad's Anger	Pixar Senior Creative Team - uncredited on Up and Inside Out
2015	The Good Dinosaur	No	No	No	No	Yes		Pixar Senior Creative Team - uncredited on Up and Inside Out
2016	Finding Dory	No	No	No	No	Yes		Pixar Senior Creative Team - uncredited on Up and Inside Out
2017	Cars 3	No	No	No	No	Yes		Pixar Senior Creative Team - uncredited on Up and Inside Out
2017	Coco	No	No	No	No	Yes		Pixar Senior Creative Team - uncredited on Up and Inside Out
2018	Incredibles 2	No	No	No	No	Yes		Pixar Senior Creative Team - uncredited on Up and Inside Out
2019	Toy Story 4	No	No	No	Yes	Yes		Pixar Senior Creative Team - uncredited on Up and Inside Out
2020	Onward	No	No	No	Yes	Yes		Pixar Senior Creative Team - uncredited on Up and Inside Out
2020	Soul	Yes	Yes	No	No	Yes		Disney+ Original films; Pixar Senior Creative Team
2021	Luca	No	No	No	Yes	Yes		Disney+ Original films; Pixar Senior Creative Team
2022	Turning Red	No	No	No	Yes	Yes		Disney+ Original films; Pixar Senior Creative Team
2022	Lightyear	No	No	No	Yes	Yes		Pixar Senior Creative Team
2023	Elemental	No	No	No	Yes	Yes		Pixar Senior Creative Team
2024	Inside Out 2	Uncredited	No	Uncredited	Yes	Yes	Dad's Anger	Pixar Senior Creative Team
2025	Elio	No	No	No	Yes	Yes		Pixar Senior Creative Team
2026	Hoppers	No	No	No	Yes	Yes		Pixar Senior Creative Team
2026	Toy Story 5	No	No	No	Yes	Yes		Pixar Senior Creative Team
2027	Gatto	No	No	No	Yes	Yes		Pixar Senior Creative Team
2028	Ghost Market	No	No	No	Yes	Yes		Pixar Senior Creative Team
2028	Incredibles 3	No	No	No	Yes	Yes		Pixar Senior Creative Team
2029	Coco 2	No	No	No	Yes	Yes		Pixar Senior Creative Team

=== Shorts and series ===
Year	Title	Director	Writer	Animator	Executive Producer	Other	Role	Notes
1985	Behind the Scenes at Camelot	No	No	No	No	Yes	Himself	
1988	Winter	Yes	Yes	Yes	Producer	No		
1989	Palm Springs	Yes	No	Yes	No	Yes	Sigmond Dinosaur	
1989	Cranium Command	No	No	Yes	No	No		
1990	Next Door	Yes	No	Yes	No	Yes	Old Man	Composer
1997	Geri's Game	No	No	Yes	No	No		
2002	Mike's New Car	Yes	Yes	No	No	No		Original Story
2005	Mr. Incredible and Pals	No	No	No	No	Yes	Mr. Incredible	
2009	Dug's Special Mission	No	No	No	Yes	No		
2009	George and A.J.	No	No	No	Yes	No		
2009	Let's Pollute	No	No	No	No	Yes		Musician: Bass
2013	Party Central	No	No	No	Yes	No		
2015	Riley's First Date?	No	No	No	Yes	Yes	Dad's Anger	
2017	Lou	No	No	No	Yes	No		
2018	Bao	No	No	No	Yes	No		
2019–2020	Forky Asks a Question	No	No	No	Yes	No		Disney+ Original short films
2020	Loop	No	No	No	No	Story Trust		Disney+ Original short films
2020	Lamp Life	No	No	No	Yes	No		Disney+ Original short films
2020	Dory's Reef Cam	No	No	No	Yes	No		Disney+ Original special
2021	Pixar Popcorn	No	No	No	Yes	No		Disney+ Original short films
2021	22 vs. Earth	No	No	No	Yes	No		Disney+ Original short films
2021	Dug Days	No	No	No	Yes	No		Disney+ Original short films
2023	Dug Days: Carl's Date	No	No	No	Yes	No		
2024	Dream Productions	No	No	No	Yes	Yes		Disney+ Original long-form limited series; Pixar Senior Creative Team
2025	Win or Lose	No	No	No	Yes	Yes		Disney+ Original long-form limited series; Pixar Senior Creative Team
2027	Loving Dory	No	No	No	Yes	No		

=== Other credits ===
Year	Title	Role
2003	Boundin'	Special Thanks
2007	Fog City Mavericks	Special Thanks
2007	The Pixar Story	Himself; Very Special Thanks
2008	Presto	Special Thanks
2009	Partly Cloudy	Special Thanks
2010	Day & Night	Special Thanks
2011	La Luna	Special Thanks
2013	The Blue Umbrella	Special Thanks
2013	Toy Story of Terror!	Extra Special Thanks
2014	Toy Story That Time Forgot	Extra Special Thanks
2014	Lava	Special Thanks
2015	Sanjay's Super Team	Special Thanks
2016	Piper	Special Thanks
2017	Baby Driver	Special Thanks - uncredited
2019	Purl	Special Thanks
2019	Kitbull	Special Thanks
2019	Float	Special Thanks
2019	Frozen II	Special Thanks
2019	Wind	Special Thanks
2020	Out	Special Thanks
2020	One Night in Miami...	Special Thanks
2020	Borat Subsequent Moviefilm	Special Thanks
2020	Canvas	Special Thanks
2020	Burrow	Special Thanks
2020–2021	Inside Pixar	Special Thanks
2021	Monsters at Work	Special Thanks
2021	Twenty Something	Special Thanks
2021	Nona	Special Thanks
2021	A Spark Story	Himself; Special Thanks
2021	Ciao Alberto	Special Thanks
2021	Pixar 2021 Disney+ Day Special	Himself
2022	Embrace the Panda: Making 'Turning Red'	Special Thanks
2022	Beyond Infinity: Buzz and the Journey to 'Lightyear'	Himself; Special Thanks
2022	Cars on the Road	Special Thanks; Pixar Senior Creative Team
2023	Good Chemistry: The Story of 'Elemental'	Special Thanks
2024	Self	Special Thanks

== Reception ==
Critical, public, and commercial reception to films Docter has directed as of January 9, 2021. Soul was released directly to Disney+ in 2020 primarily in response to the COVID-19 pandemic, a contributing factor to its box-office earnings. It had a limited theatrical run in 2024.

Film	Rotten Tomatoes	Metacritic	CinemaScore	Budget	Box office
Monsters, Inc.	96% (196 reviews)	79 (35 reviews)	A+	$115 million	$577.4 million
Up	98% (295 reviews)	88 (37 reviews)	A+	$175 million	$735.1 million
Inside Out	98% (369 reviews)	94 (55 reviews)	A	$175 million	$857.6 million
Soul	95% (309 reviews)	83 (55 reviews)	N/A	$150 million	$120.9 million

== Awards and nominations ==
Organizations	Year	Category	Work	Result	Ref.
Academy Awards	1995	Best Original Screenplay	Toy Story	Nominated	
Academy Awards	2001	Best Animated Feature	Monsters, Inc.	Nominated	
Academy Awards	2002	Best Animated Short Film	Mike's New Car	Nominated	
Academy Awards	2008	Best Original Screenplay	WALL-E	Nominated	
Academy Awards	2009	Best Animated Feature	Up	Won	
Academy Awards	2009	Best Original Screenplay	Up	Nominated	
Academy Awards	2015	Best Animated Feature	Inside Out	Won	
Academy Awards	2015	Best Original Screenplay	Inside Out	Nominated	
Academy Awards	2020	Best Animated Feature	Soul	Won	
Annie Awards	1996	Best Individual Achievement in Animation	Toy Story	Won	
Annie Awards	2000	Outstanding Achievement in Writing	Toy Story 2	Won	
Annie Awards	2002	Directing in a Feature Production	Monsters, Inc.	Nominated	
Annie Awards	2010	Directing in a Feature Production	Up	Won	
Annie Awards	2010	Writing in a Feature Production	Up	Nominated	
Annie Awards	2016	Directing in a Feature Production	Inside Out	Won	
Annie Awards	2016	Writing in a Feature Production	Inside Out	Won	
Annie Awards	2021	Directing in a Feature Production	Soul	Nominated	
Annie Awards	2021	Writing in a Feature Production	Soul	Won	
BAFTA Awards	2009	Best Animated Film	Up	Won	
BAFTA Awards	2009	Best Original Screenplay	Up	Nominated	
BAFTA Awards	2015	Best Animated Film	Inside Out	Won	
BAFTA Awards	2015	Best Original Screenplay	Inside Out	Nominated	
Critics' Choice Movie Awards	2001	Best Animated Feature	Monsters, Inc.	Nominated	
Critics' Choice Movie Awards	2009	Best Animated Feature	Up	Won	
Critics' Choice Movie Awards	2009	Best Original Screenplay	Up	Nominated	
Critics' Choice Movie Awards	2015	Best Animated Feature	Inside Out	Won	
Critics' Choice Movie Awards	2015	Best Original Screenplay	Inside Out	Nominated	
Critics' Choice Movie Awards	2015	Best Comedy	Inside Out	Nominated	
Hugo Awards	1995	Best Dramatic Presentation	Toy Story	Nominated	
Hugo Awards	2001	Best Dramatic Presentation	Monsters Inc.	Nominated	
Hugo Awards	2008	Best Dramatic Presentation, Long Form	Wall-E	Won	
Hugo Awards	2009	Best Dramatic Presentation, Long Form	Up	Nominated	
NAACP Image Awards	2021	Outstanding Writing in a Motion Picture	Soul	Nominated	
Nebula Award	2008	Best Script	WALL-E	Won	
Ray Bradbury Award	2009	Outstanding Dramatic Presentation	Up	Nominated	
Ray Bradbury Award	2015	Outstanding Dramatic Presentation	Inside Out	Nominated	
Satellite Awards	2009	Best Original Screenplay	Up	Nominated	
Satellite Awards	2015	Best Animated or Mixed Media Feature	Inside Out	Won	
Satellite Awards	2015	Best Original Screenplay	Inside Out	Nominated	

== Collaborators (actors) ==
Docter has cast certain actors and crew members in many of the films he has directed.

	Monsters, Inc.	Up	Inside Out	Soul
Mary Gibbs	X mark		X mark	
Bob Peterson	X mark	X mark		
John Ratzenberger	X mark	X mark	X mark	
Frank Oz	X mark		X mark	
Jeff Pidgeon	X mark	X mark		
Himself	X mark	X mark	X mark	
Danny Mann	X mark	X mark		
Mickie McGowan	X mark	X mark		
Josh Cooley		X mark	X mark	
John Cygan		X mark	X mark	
Ronnie del Carmen			X mark	X mark

== See also ==
- Directors with two films rated "A+" by CinemaScore
- List of Pixar films
- List of Pixar staff
