= Dug Days =

American series of animated short films

- Official release poster
- Genre: Slice of life Comedy
- Created by: Bob Peterson
- Written by: Bob Peterson
- Directed by: Bob Peterson
- Starring: Bob Peterson; Ed Asner
- Opening theme: "Opening (Spirit of Adventure)" by Andrea Datzman and Curtis Green
- Composers: Andrea Datzman; Curtis Green
- Country of origin: United States
- Original language: English
- No. of episodes: 6

Production
- Executive producers: Pete Docter; Mark Nielsen
- Producer: Kim Collins
- Cinematography: Arjun Rihan; Josée Lajoie
- Editor: Torbin Xan Bullock
- Running time: 6-9 minutes
- Production company: Pixar Animation Studios

Original release
- Network: Disney+
- Release: September 1, 2021 – June 16, 2023

Dug Days (also known as Up: Dug Days) is an American animated series of shorts created, written, and directed by Bob Peterson and produced by Pixar Animation Studios initially for Disney+. The series is set immediately after the 2009 film Up, following its main characters, dog Dug, voiced by Peterson, and his owner, 78-year-old Carl Fredricksen, voiced by Ed Asner in one of his last performances before his death.

The series was announced in December 2020, during Disney's Investor Day, with Peterson pitched the series centering on Dug following his work on Forky Asks a Question. The animators created new animation rigging, textures, and hair for the characters in order to update their original designs due to advances in CG animation ever since the original film's release. Due to the COVID-19 pandemic in the United States, most of the final results from the animating process were done from the crew's homes, and the cast remotely recorded their dialogue.

The first five episodes of Dug Days premiered on September 1, 2021, on Disney+. They received generally positive reviews for their voice performances, messages, role models, humor and emotional depth.

Carl's Date, the sixth and final episode, first premiered in theaters as a short film with Pixar's Elemental on June 16, 2023.

== Premise ==
After the events of Up, Golden Retriever Dug and his owner, Carl Fredricksen, move to a new house in the suburb after Carl sells the Spirit of Adventure dirigible to afford it. The miniseries revolves around the adventures of Dug and Carl experienced in their house and neighborhood.

== Voice cast ==
- Bob Peterson as Dug
- Ed Asner as Carl Fredricksen
- Jordan Nagai (unused archival recordings) as Russell (episode "Science")
- Neketia Henry as the Neighbor (episode "Puppies")
- Simon Helberg as the Squirrel (episode "Science")
- Jeff Pidgeon as the Fly (episode "Science")
- Sarayu Blue as the Bluebird/Blue jay (episode "Science")
- Heather Eisner as the Snail (episode "Science")
- Moon Choe as Russell's mother (episode "Science")
- Bob Peterson as Beta (formerly Alpha) (episode "Carl's Date")

== Episodes ==
All episodes are directed and written by Bob Peterson.

No.	Title	Storyboard by	Original air date	Original release
1	"Squirrel!"	Paula Assadourian	September 1, 2021	Disney+
Having returned to the suburbs after the adventure in Paradise Falls, Carl builds a birdhouse in his backyard for the birds. Dug takes it upon himself to guard the birdhouse so that the birds can feed from the seeds. However, a squirrel inhabiting a nearby tree steals the seeds, running corners around Dug. Dug resorts to feeding the bird with seeds from a bag. After pursuing the squirrel again, Dug ends up on the tree branch which breaks under his weight, causing all the seeds to flow out of the squirrel's nest. Taking pity on the squirrel, Dug shares Carl's peanut butter with him. Dug informs Carl of his efforts to guard the birdhouse. Though shocked at the damage, he compliments Dug for his efforts.
2	"Puppies"	Tony Rosenast	September 1, 2021	Disney+
Carl babysits five puppies for the day, enlisting Dug's help to look after them. The puppies are sleeping when they arrive, but Dug chooses to wake them up to play. Things start to go awry when the puppies chew on Dug's ears and tail. Dug laments that the puppies are not how he thought they would be. They then discover his toys, tearing one apart. He is able to keep the rest safe briefly, but ultimately all but his pig (his favorite) are torn apart. He constructs a wall of lawn furniture and other items to protect his pig from the puppies. When the squirrel encroaches on the bird feeder and the puppies cower from him, he teaches them not to be afraid and how to bark at him. When the puppies' owner arrives to take them home, Dug gives them his pig to take with them. As he falls asleep, he asks Carl if they can get some puppies of their own. Carl replies they can talk about it tomorrow.
3	"Smell"	Christian Roman	September 1, 2021	Disney+
Dug is enjoying smelling the smells in the neighborhood. When the wind changes, bringing more smells with it, there is a smell he has never smelled before. Digging through the azaleas (to Carl's annoyance) and under the fence, he goes along the street to find the smell belongs to a fire. Dug hurries back home to tell Carl, losing his collar in the process. He manages to convince Carl to come with him by going for a walk, and is subsequently awarded a Hero Dog medal.
4	"Flowers"	Alexander Pimwong	September 1, 2021	Disney+
After attending a town festival, Carl and Dug pass the night in the yard to watch the fireworks, that are described by Carl as "big flowers", then Dug gets panicked when hearing the explosion of the fireworks and runs around the yard and the house, Dug eventually faints and began dreaming about things he likes until the flowers become alive and his dream becomes a nightmare. Carl wakes up Dug and put him some headphones to prevent him from hearing the explosions, calming his dog so he can enjoy the rest of the show.
5	"Science"	Melody Cisinski	September 1, 2021	Disney+
Russell uses some of the special collars created by Charles Muntz to do experiments in other animals by allowing them to have their own voice, this makes the squirrel and a blue jay to be able to speak with Dug. When he learns about the needs each one has because they live in the wild, this makes Dug understand their feelings and remembers the days when he was expelled from Muntz's dog pack for being less competent than the others. He finally shares a sandwich Russell gave him while Russell and Carl watch him in approval. Later that night, Dug asks Carl if he is only a pet. While admitting that he is a pet, Carl affirms that to Dug that he is also his best friend.
6	"Carl's Date"	Bob Peterson	June 16, 2023	Theatrically with Elemental
Carl gets a phone call from Ms. Meyers, an elder who lives at the nursing home, and agrees to go on a date with her, only to immediately regret it. Carl reveals to Dug that he is nervous as he has not been with anyone since Ellie passed away and does not know what to do. Dug makes suggestions on what to do, most of which involves dog related things. Carl decides to go out and get some things to prepare for his date. When Carl attempts to call off the date, Dug tells Carl that he should go on the date and not worry. Dug then offers to go along as backup and Carl agrees. Before leaving, Carl speaks to Ellie's photo and tells her that he is going on a new adventure, and that she will always be his girl.

== Production ==
=== Development ===
The series was announced on December 10, 2020, during Disney's Investor Day. It was produced by Pixar, with Bob Peterson as its creator, director, and writer. It premiered on Disney+, with five episodes, on September 1, 2021. Peterson pitched the series following his work on Forky Asks a Question, as he wanted to revisit the characters from Up, and felt a short series centering on Dug was the appropriate format. Kim Collins joined as producer after Peterson wrote the series. Up director and Pixar chief creative officer Pete Docter was an executive-producer for the series; Docter supervised the series so it would be faithful to the original film.

=== Writing ===
Peterson said the idea behind the series was to explore Dug adapting to suburban life and Carl as he goes through new, smaller adventures that put in practice what he learned in the film, with Collins describing the series as, ultimately, "about how Carl and Dug take care of each other". Peterson said the episodic format allowed the filmmakers to explore "facets of a dog's life", such as "territoriality" via having him face a squirrel.

=== Casting ===
In addition to writing and directing the series, Peterson reprises his role as Dug from the film. Ed Asner, voice actor of Carl Fredricksen from both the film and the series, died on August 29, three days before the series premiere, making it his first posthumous performance ever released and is dedicated in his memory. Unused archive recordings of Jordan Nagai as Russell were used in the episode "Science", as Nagai had retired from acting by the time the series entered development.

Due to lockdowns product of the COVID-19 pandemic, the cast had to remotely record most of their dialogue, though Asner managed to have a physical recording session a month prior to the lockdown, according to Collins.

=== Animation ===
Due to the COVID-19 pandemic, the series was animated remotely, with approximately 100 animators working on the series, a smaller number than usual for a Pixar production. All episodes were produced simultaneously. The series also had a tighter production schedule than most Pixar productions, due to being released on streaming.

For Carl's new home, animators created a design reminiscent of his old home while also being different. They also used similar design aesthetics for Carl's neighborhood. The animators also used the Presto animation system to create new animation rigging, textures, and hair for the characters in order to update their original designs due to advances in CG animation ever since the original film's release, which used the Marionette animation system. Carl's animation and movement was altered to reflect the events of the original film.

=== Music ===
The score for Dug Days was composed by Andrea Datzman and Curtis Green. Up composer and longtime Pixar collaborator Michael Giacchino was approached to return for the series, but declined due to scheduling issues, and instead recommended Datzman, who in turn contacted Green to help with the score. The score references Giacchino's work for the original film. According to producer Kim Collins, the score for each episode features different tones and themes. The score for the series was released on September 1, 2021.

== Release ==
The first five episodes of Dug Days premiered on September 1, 2021 on Disney+. The sixth and final episode, "Carl's Date", was originally scheduled to debut on Disney+ on February 10, 2023, but instead premiered in theaters on June 16, 2023, along with Pixar's Elemental. Carl's Date was later released on Disney+ on September 13, 2023. Carl's Date was also released on September 26, 2023 as a bonus feature included on the Ultra HD Blu-ray and Blu-ray releases of Elemental.

== Reception ==
=== Critical response ===
Joel Keller of Decider found the humor of the series simple yet effective and praised the performances of the cast members, claimed that the interactions between the characters manage bring an emotional bond between them, while complimenting the animation. Joly Herman of Common Sense Media rated the series 4 out of 5 stars and complimented Dug Days for providing positive messages such as kindness and loyalty, while praising the depiction of diverse positive role models through the characters.

=== Accolades ===
Dug Days' fifth episode, "Science", received a nomination for Best Animated Television Production for Children at the 49th Annie Awards. At the 1st Children's and Family Emmy Awards, the series was nominated for Outstanding Directing for an Animated Program, Outstanding Writing for an Animated Program, and Outstanding Editing for an Animated Program (Torbin Xan Bullock). "Digged" won Best Animation/Family for a TV/Streaming Series at the 2022 Golden Trailer Awards.
