= Carl's Date =

2023 Pixar short by Bob Peterson

- Film poster
- Directed by: Bob Peterson
- Written by: Bob Peterson
- Produced by: Kim Collins
- Starring: Ed Asner; Bob Peterson
- Cinematography: Arjun Rihan; Ryan Michero
- Edited by: Torbin Xan Bullock; Catherine Apple
- Music by: Andrea Datzman
- Production company: Pixar Animation Studios
- Distributed by: Walt Disney Studios; Motion Pictures
- Release date: June 16, 2023 (with Elemental)
- Running time: 8 minutes
- Country: United States
- Language: English

Carl's Date (Note: Titled Dug Days: Carl's Date on Disney+) is a 2023 American animated short film produced by Pixar Animation Studios, written and directed by Bob Peterson and produced by Kim Collins. It acts as the sixth and final episode of the miniseries Dug Days, as well as the final entry in the Up franchise. It stars the voice of Ed Asner, in his final acting role before his death in 2021, and Peterson. The short film follows Carl Fredricksen (Asner), who reluctantly goes on his first date since his late wife Ellie's death, but has no idea how dating works. Originally planned for release on Disney+, Carl's Date premiered in theaters on June 16, 2023, along with Pixar's Elemental.

== Plot ==
While trying to train Dug at home, Carl gets a phone call from Ms. Meyers, an elder who lives at the nursing home, and Alpha (now named Beta) who declares his love for his new home. After Dug has a conversation with Beta, Carl speaks with Ms. Meyers again and agrees to something, only to immediately regret it after hanging up the phone. Carl reveals to Dug that he just agreed to go on a date with her. He is nervous as he has not been with anyone since Ellie passed away and does not know what to do. Dug makes suggestions on what to do, most of which involves dog related things. Carl decides to go out and get some things to prepare for his date.

Carl buys numerous boxes of chocolate and tries to get some flowers from his garden. He has a practice dance with Dug as well as a practice dinner afterwards. Carl then dyes his hair and eyebrows black, which confuses Dug. When Carl attempts to call Ms. Meyers to call off the date, Dug wrestles the phone away from him, destroying it in the process, and tells Carl that he should go on the date and not worry as Ms. Meyers will love him. Carl relaxes and gets himself ready. Dug then offers to go along as backup and Carl agrees. Before leaving, Carl speaks to Ellie's photo and tells her that he is going on a new adventure, and that she will always be his girl.

After the credits, a message reads, "In loving memory of Ed Asner. Thanks for the adventure".

== Voice cast ==
- Ed Asner as Carl Fredricksen
- Bob Peterson as Dug and Alpha

== Production ==
On December 19, 2022, it was announced that Dug Days would get a short film titled Carl's Date, originally set to stream on Disney+ during a montage of content coming in 2023. Prior to his death on August 29, 2021, Ed Asner recorded his dialogue in the spring of 2021. Animation took place entirely during the pandemic from 2021 to 2022, with a downsized crew of 30 to 35 people handling the project, which included roughly 10 animators. Nevertheless, the team utilized updated lighting and fur-rendering technology to give Carl and Dug a refreshed look than in Up (2009). Writer and director Bob Peterson conceived the story when he wanted to explore the nerves and humor of re-entering the dating world as an older adult while honoring a past marriage after watching his grandparents navigate dating later in life. Andrea Datzman, who co-scored Dug Days with Curtis Green, composed the short film.

At a screening of Carl's Date, ComicBook.com had a chance to speak with Peterson and Collins about the short film during a press day for Elemental at Pixar Animation Studios. Peterson stated, "No one will ever replace Ellie for Carl. This is just friendship. This is just honoring her, Ellie saying 'go have a new adventure.' And this really puts that to the test. Should he do this or not?". He also stated, "For now, I'm thinking of it as a bow on the story. You know, you never say never, things do ebb and get a great idea or whatever it is, but I think this ends up being a terrific way to end this little miniseries."

== Reception ==
Ethan Anderton of /Film says Carl's Date is not just a short film, but also a "charming epilogue for Pixar's Up that sends Carl off on a new kind of adventure." Anderton also says, "Like Pixar's best work, the short has a moving emotional core inspired by real life, mixed with some delightful comedy involving everybody's favorite, easily distracted, talking dog Dug." Anderton describes the story as "an amusing series of events where Dug tries to help Carl psyche himself to go on a date, something that is particularly daunting since it will be the first date he's gone on since his wife Ellie passed away." Anderton says, "This is a charming, wonderful short that is worthy of playing in theaters, and if you think you're going to get out of this one without shedding some tears, think again. Get those tissues ready!"

== Release ==
On January 17, 2023, it was announced that Carl's Date was scheduled to debut on Disney+ on February 10, 2023, before it was delayed. It ultimately debuted in theaters in front of Pixar's Elemental on June 16, 2023.

With the exception of Toy Story (1995) and Coco (2017) which were only preceded by a short film in a limited capacity in theaters or home video, each of Pixar's first 20 feature films from A Bug's Life (1998) to Cars 3 (2017) as well as Incredibles 2 (2018) were preceded by a new in-house Pixar short film for their entire initial worldwide theatrical runs and on their initial home video releases. Starting with their 21st film, Toy Story 4 (2019), Pixar broke their tradition of releasing a short before every new Pixar feature film. Following Toy Story 4, Luca (2021), Turning Red (2022), and Lightyear (2022) also released without an attached short film at any point in theaters or home video. In 2020, a Simpsons short film titled Playdate with Destiny (which is not a Pixar short film) played before Pixar's Onward in theaters, and later that year, Pixar released a short film (under their SparkShorts label) titled Burrow in front of their next film, Soul, theatrically in countries where Disney+ was not available. With the release of Carl's Date before Elemental in 2023, it marked the first and only pairing of a new Pixar short with a new Pixar feature film in a worldwide theatrical release since Bao, which was theatrically released before Incredibles 2 in 2018.

Carl's Date was released on August 15, 2023, as a bonus feature included on the digital release of Elemental, ahead of the Ultra HD Blu-ray and Blu-ray releases on September 26. It was also released on Disney+ on September 13.
