= Josh Cooley =

American filmmaker

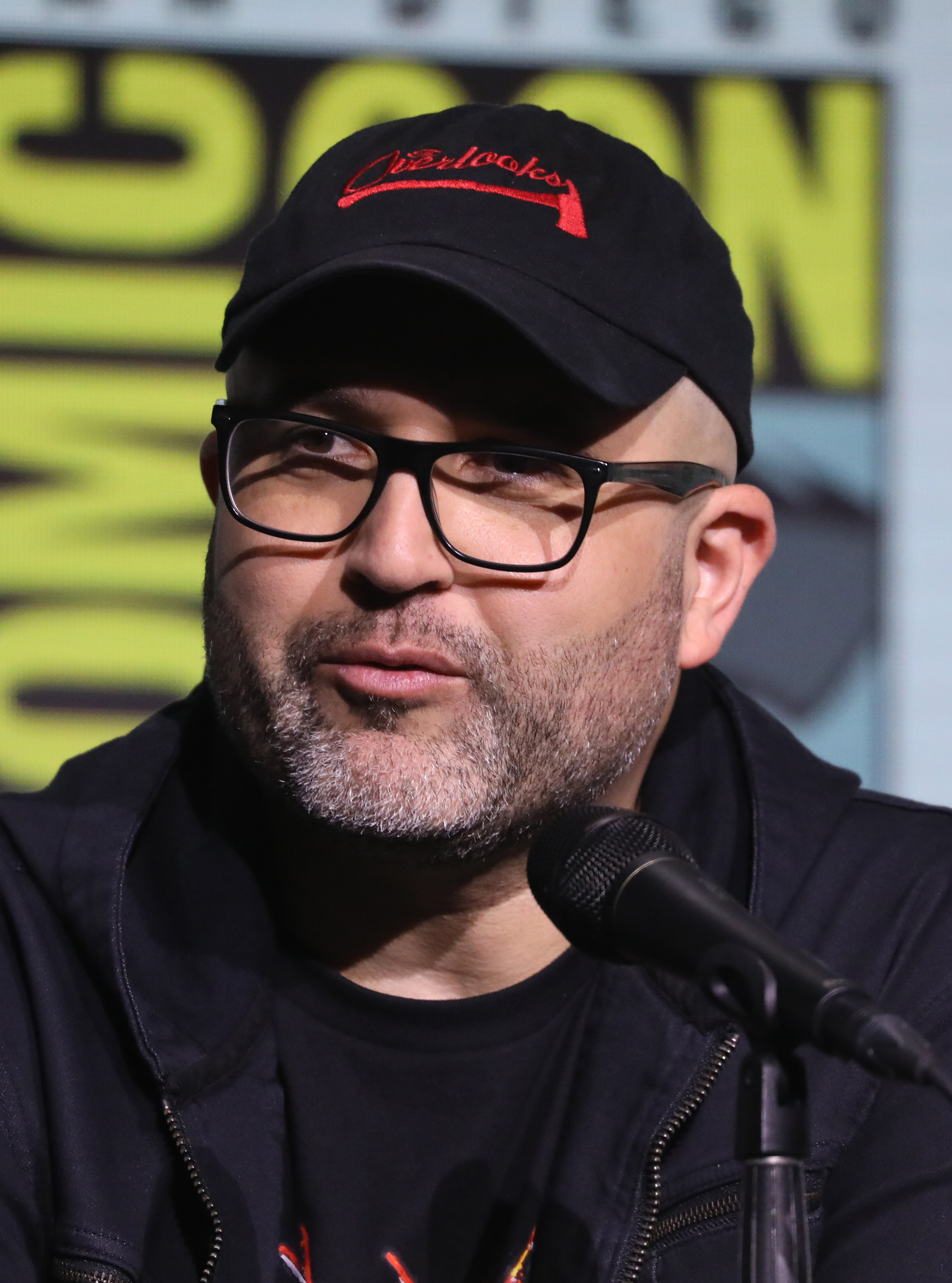
- Cooley at the 2024 San Diego Comic-Con
- Born: May 23; Berkeley, California, U.S.
- Occupations: Film director; screenwriter; storyboard artist; voice actor
- Years active: 2003–present
- Employers: Pixar Animation Studios (2003–2020); Paramount Animation (2020–present)
- Awards: Academy Award for Best Animated Feature; Toy Story 4 (2019)

Joshua Cooley (born May 23) is an American filmmaker, storyboard artist, and voice actor. He is best known for directing the animated films Toy Story 4 (2019) and Transformers One (2024), with the former winning the Academy Award for Best Animated Feature. He also co-wrote the screenplay for the film Inside Out (2015), which was nominated for the Academy Award for Best Original Screenplay.

== Career ==
Cooley was recruited by Joe Ranft at Pixar, where he started his career as an intern, mostly working as a storyboard artist on films including The Incredibles (2004), Cars (2006), Ratatouille (2007), Up (2009), and Cars 2 (2011). In 2009, Cooley wrote and directed a short film George & A.J. for Pixar and Walt Disney Pictures.

Cooley worked as a screenwriter and storyboard supervisor on the film Inside Out (2015), which was released to financial success with audiences. Cooley received an Academy Award nomination for Best Original Screenplay for his work on the film, alongside Pete Docter (the film's director), Ronnie Del Carmen (co-director), and Meg LeFauve. The same year, he wrote and directed another short film titled Riley's First Date?

Following completion of Cooley's work on Inside Out in 2015, he was tapped by John Lasseter and Andrew Stanton to co-direct Toy Story 4. In 2016, Cooley replaced Lasseter as the film's director. Toy Story 4 was Cooley's directorial debut. Upon release, the film received critical acclaim, and Cooley took home his first Academy Award for Best Animated Feature. Cooley left Pixar in March 2020.

In 2024, Cooley directed the animated Transformers film, titled Transformers One, for Paramount Pictures. The film is set on the Transformers home planet of Cybertron and focuses on the origins of Optimus Prime and Megatron.

On May 19, 2020, it was reported that Cooley will write and direct a live-action adaptation of the children's book Malamander by Thomas Taylor for Sony Pictures, marking his first live-action film. In addition, on July 10, 2020, it was announced that Cooley would be the writer and director of the film Little Monsters, starring Universal Monsters characters, for Universal Pictures. On June 23, 2021, Cooley was set to write a film based on the Disney Parks attraction Tower of Terror, with Scarlett Johansson starring and producing the project, after previously working together on Transformers One.

In June 2025, Cooley entered talks to direct a film adaptation of the children's book I Eat Poop: A Dung Beetle Story for Paramount Animation and Maximum Effort.

In October 2025, it was announced that Cooley was attached to direct a film titled London Ghost Tour for Miramax. Described as ""Night at the Museum meets An American Werewolf in London", Terry Rossio will write the screenplay. London Ghost Tour is intended to be the first film of a trilogy.

In June 2026, it was announced that Cooley would direct a live-action animation hybrid film based on the Lego brand with Keanu Reeves set to star.

In September 2026, it was announced that Cooley would write a film adaptation of 99 Nights in the Forest with Sam Raimi and Rob Tapert producing.

== Filmography ==
=== Films ===
| Year | Title | Director | Writer | Story Supervisor | Story Artist | Other | Voice Role | Notes |
|---|---|---|---|---|---|---|---|---|
| 2004 | The Incredibles | No | No | No | Uncredited | No | | |
| 2006 | Cars | No | No | No | Additional | No | | |
| 2007 | Ratatouille | No | No | No | Yes | No | | |
| 2009 | Up | No | No | No | Yes | Yes | Omega | |
| 2011 | Cars 2 | No | No | Additional | No | No | | |
| 2015 | Inside Out | No | Screenplay | Yes | No | Yes | Jangles | |
| 2019 | Toy Story 4 | Yes | Original Story | No | No | Yes | | Additional Screenplay Material; Pixar Senior Creative Team |
| 2020 | We Bare Bears: The Movie | No | No | No | No | Yes | Painting Elephant | Additional Voices |
| 2020 | Soul | No | No | No | No | Yes | | Additional Dialogue Contributions; Pixar Senior Creative Team |
| 2024 | Transformers One | Yes | No | No | No | Yes | Control Room Guys / PA System / Skywarp | |
| 2026 | Hoppers | No | No | No | No | Yes | Additional Voices | |

==== Shorts ====
| Year | Title | Director | Writer | Story Artist | Editor | Other | Voice Role | Notes |
|---|---|---|---|---|---|---|---|---|
| 2005 | Mindwalk | No | No | No | Film | No | | |
| 2009 | Calendar Confloption | No | No | Yes | No | No | | |
| 2009 | George and A.J. | Yes | Yes | No | No | No | | |
| 2010 | Cars Toons: Mater's Tall Tales | No | No | No | No | Yes | Additional Voices | Episodes 8-9 |
| 2011 | Toy Story Toons: Small Fry | No | No | No | Story | Yes | Cashier / Lizard Wizard | |
| 2013 | Cars Toons: Tales from Radiator Springs | No | No | No | No | Yes | Bug / Additional Voices | Episodes 1-3 |
| 2013 | Toy Story of Terror! | No | No | No | No | Yes | Officer Phillips | TV special |
| 2015 | Riley's First Date? | Yes | Yes | No | No | Yes | Dad's Sadness | |
| 2021 | 22 vs. Earth | No | Yes | No | No | No | | Disney+ Original Short Film |

==== Other credits ====
| Year | Title | Role |
|---|---|---|
| 2009 | Tracy | Cameraman #2, Extras, Camera Operator, Artist |
| 2015 | The Good Dinosaur | Special Thanks |
| 2017 | Coco | Pixar Senior Creative Team |
| 2018 | Incredibles 2 | Pixar Senior Creative Team |
| 2019-20 | Forky Asks a Question | Special Thanks |
| 2020 | Lamp Life | Special Thanks |
| 2020 | Onward | Special Thanks, Pixar Senior Creative Team |
