= O Brother, Where Bart Thou? =

- The Simpsons episode
- Episode no.: Season 21; Episode 8
- Directed by: Steven Dean Moore
- Written by: Matt Selman
- Production code: MABF01
- Original air date: December 13, 2009

Guest appearances
- Kim Cattrall as The Fourth Simpson Child; Huell Howser as himself; Cooper Manning as himself; Eli Manning as himself; Peyton Manning as himself; Jordan Nagai as Charlie; Dick Smothers as himself; Tom Smothers as himself

Episode features
- Couch gag: The living room furniture is dancing to disco music until the Simpsons come in and Homer yells, "Hey!" The furniture returns to normal and the Simpsons sit on the couch without incident.

Episode chronology
← Previous "Rednecks and Broomsticks"	Next → "Thursdays with Abie"
- The Simpsons season 21

"O Brother, Where Bart Thou?" is the eighth episode of the twenty-first season of the American animated television series The Simpsons. Being the last episode to air in the 2000s, it originally aired on the Fox network in the United States on December 13, 2009. In this episode, Bart goes on a quest to get a baby brother out of envy of the sisterly bond Lisa has with Maggie.

The episode, written by Matt Selman and directed by Steven Dean Moore, received positive reviews from critics. This was the last episode to air in the 2000s.

It was viewed in 7.11 million homes in its original airing in the United States.

== Plot ==
The entire Simpson family stays at home during a blizzard. The weather is too wild to play outside and the power goes out, so Bart participates in a pretend fashion show put on by his sisters, Lisa and Maggie. When he notices the bond shared by the two girls, Lisa suggests that he is jealous because he does not have a brother to share a similar bond with. That night, Bart dreams about being in a park (called Bro-Town USA) with the Smothers Brothers, the Marx Brothers, the Blues Brothers, the Smith Brothers, the Wright Brothers, the Mario Brothers, the Mannings (Cooper, Eli and Peyton), and even the Terwiliger brothers (Sideshow Bob and Cecil). Bart awakens with the realization that he actually wants a brother.

After getting turned down by Homer (who gives a lengthy monologue detailing why he feels daughters are better than sons), Bart consults with his friends at the bus stop (Which they resemble the four main South Park characters in this part). Nelson advises Bart to trick Marge and Homer into having a baby the same way Nelson's mom tried tricking former basketball player Charles Barkley. Bart's first attempt is to make them a romantic dinner, but Marge and Homer are too stuffed to feel amorous. In his second attempt, Bart leaves a Kama Sutra DVD in his parents' bedroom, but the two end up injuring themselves after emulating the sex positions. Frustrated, he seeks the advice of Dolph, Jimbo, and Kearney, who tell him to hide Marge's birth control pills.

Bart replaces Marge's birth control pills with Tic Tacs (just as he did with Mrs. Krabappel's in "Itchy & Scratchy: The Movie") and discards the Tic Tacs container that now has the birth control pills inside, which Nelson finds and eats (giving the bully mood swings due to the estrogen ingestion). Marge catches Bart tampering with her pills and he confesses that he wants a brother. While sympathetic to her son, Marge explains that she and Homer are fine with just three kids—she also notes that even if she and Homer do ever end up having a fourth child, the baby very well could end up being another girl instead of boy, resulting in Bart having three sisters. Bart goes to a local orphanage and tries adopting a child, but is ultimately turned away for being too young. However, a young boy named Charlie follows Bart home and Bart takes him in as his younger brother.

Bart and Charlie do brotherly things together, including playing pranks on Principal Skinner and hanging out at the Kwik-E-Mart. When Lisa insists that Charlie be returned to the orphanage, Bart disregards her and takes Charlie to see a horror movie titled Sever V. The movie terrifies Charlie, which makes Bart realize that being an older brother requires responsibility. On their way back from the movie, Chief Wiggum tries to apprehend Charlie, but the two boys escape and hide in a snowbank. Back in the snowbank, Lisa pleads with Bart to do the right thing and let Charlie be legally adopted by another family, even insisting that while he won't have a younger brother, he will still be a big brother to her. When the children are sealed in by a snowplow (by Barney riding on his Plow King truck), Bart and Charlie urinate on the snow to melt it and open an escape tunnel, much to Lisa's disgust. After taking Charlie back to the orphanage, Homer and Bart come to visit Charlie, but they find out that Charlie is now adopted by a family with six daughters, and, much to Charlie's dismay, all six of his new sisters treat him like their personal fashion doll. To cheer Bart up, Homer takes him to see Sever V.

== Production ==
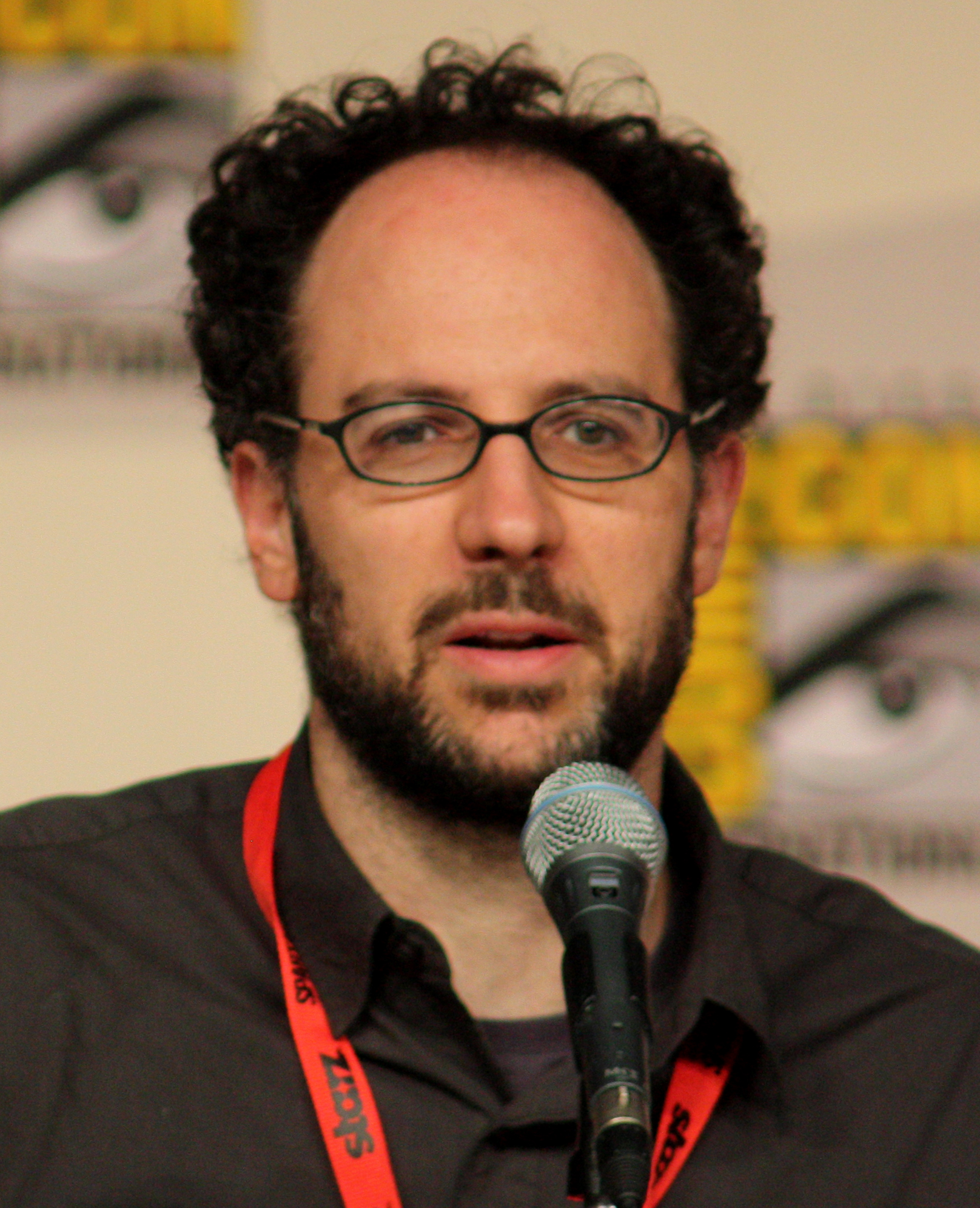
Matt Selman wrote the episode.

The Smothers Brothers (Tom and Dick), Peyton Manning, Eli Manning, Cooper Manning and Huell Howser all guest starred as themselves in this episode.

The three Mannings recorded their parts in New Orleans under the supervision of The Simpsons writer Tim Long. Jean said the staff liked Peyton's work on Saturday Night Live, "and Cooper is really funny, too. They were really good [in the episode]." Cooper commented on recording the episode: "It took 20 minutes tops. I did enjoy the experience. [...] You can screw up as much as you want. You just do your lines over and over for a couple of takes, then throw some fake laughs in there. All three of us doing it at the same time on three different microphones. Yeah, I thought it was a lot of fun."

Jordan Nagai appeared as Charlie. Nagai, who starred in the animated film Up (which was released the same year this episode premiered), recorded his dialogue alongside Nancy Cartwright, the voice of Bart. To date, he is the youngest guest star the show has had, being 9 years old at the time. He also holds the distinction of being the first guest star who was born after the show premiered.

Kim Cattrall voiced Bart's imaginary third sister. She previously appeared in the sixteenth season episode "She Used to Be My Girl" as a different character.

Creator Matt Groening was a fan of Howser's show California's Gold, and the show created a character named Howell Huser for the sixteenth season episode "There's Something About Marrying". Howser played himself in this episode because he was delighted by the homage.

Showrunner Al Jean said having the Smothers Brothers, who sing over the end credits, on the show was "a dream come true".

John Frink was promoted to executive producer in this episode.

== Cultural references ==
Bart's dream of famous brothers include Eli, Peyton and Cooper Manning, the Smothers Brothers, Jake and Elwood Blues from The Blues Brothers, the Wright Brothers, The Marx Brothers, the Smith Brothers, and Nintendo's Mario Brothers. Bart imagining having a three sisters is a parody of Sex and the City. The episode title references The Simpsons season 2 episode "Oh Brother, Where Art Thou?" The movie Bart and Charlie see is a parody of the Saw franchise with Billy the Puppet. The scene at the bus stop with Bart, Milhouse, Nelson, and Ralph is a reference to the animated series South Park, in which the four boys are dressed like Stan Marsh, Kyle Broflovski, Eric Cartman, and Kenny McCormick, respectively, with Otto Mann shouting, "Oh my God! I killed Kenny!", to which Milhouse replies, "Ralph," but Otto replies saying, "No, I killed Kenny yesterday. What did I do now?"

== Reception ==
The episode was viewed by 7.11 million people with a Nielsen Rating of 3.2/8 and came in second on the Animation Domination lineup slightly behind Family Guy. The Simpsons was the third most viewed episode on Fox, after Family Guy and Bones. The episode was 3rd ranked on Fox in the 18–49 rating after Family Guy and Glee and made it at 21 in all.

IGN's Robert Canning gave the episode a 7.6/10, saying "The episode did well by sticking to one main story instead of adding a weaker "B" storyline to fill the half hour."

Emily VanDerWerff of The A.V. Club gave the episode a B+ calling it "another fine outing."

Matt Selman was nominated for a Writers Guild of America Award for Outstanding Writing in Animation at the 63rd Writers Guild of America Awards for his script to this episode.
