= Bob Peterson (filmmaker) =

American animator, director and writer (born 1961)

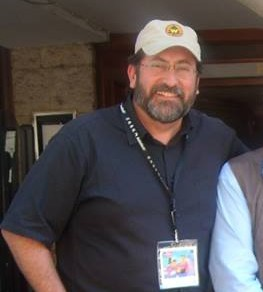
- Peterson in 2015
- Born: Robert Peterson; January 18, 1961 (age 65); Wooster, Ohio, U.S.
- Education: Ohio Northern University, Bachelor of Science in Mechanical Engineering, 1983; Purdue University, Master's degree in Mechanical Engineering, 1986
- Occupations: Cartoonist; animator; director; screenwriter; storyboard supervisor; voice actor
- Years active: 1979–present
- Employer: Pixar Animation Studios (1994–present)

Robert Peterson (born January 18, 1961) is an American cartoonist, animator, director, screenwriter, storyboard supervisor, and voice actor at Pixar. He was hired at Pixar by Roger Gould in 1994 as an animator for commercials, before subsequently becoming an animator on Toy Story (1995). He was the co-director, co-star, co-head, and co-writer for Up (2009). He conceived the idea of The Good Dinosaur (2015), and was the film's original director before being dismissed from it. His work as a writer for the films Up and Finding Nemo (2003) earned him nominations for the Academy Award for Best Original Screenplay. He was also a co-writer on Cars 3 (2017) and won the Primetime Emmy Award for Outstanding Short Form Animated Program for his work on Forky Asks A Question (2020).

== Career ==
Peterson's early career as an artist started when he was a mechanical engineering student at Ohio Northern University (1979-1983) and then as a graduate student at Purdue University (1983-1986). At Ohio Northern, Peterson drew a weekly cartoon "For Pete's Sake". At Purdue, Peterson drew the cartoon "Loco Motives" for the Purdue student newspaper, the Purdue Exponent. Prior to his graduation from Purdue in December 1986, the Exponent published "Loco Motives: Boilercoaster 84-86, The Best of the Purdue Exponent's Loco Motives Cartoon", a paper-back collection of Peterson's cartoons. In October 1986 Peterson autographed copies at a book-signing event in the Purdue Memorial Union. At least one copy of the book is known to have original, signed artwork inside the book cover which was drawn by Peterson during the book-signing.

Peterson has also voiced characters for various Pixar projects such as Geri in the short Geri's Game (1997), Roz in Monsters, Inc. (2001) and Monsters University (2013), Mr. Ray in Finding Nemo (2003) and Finding Dory (2016), and Dug and Alpha in Up (2009). His most recent vocal work is playing the Universal Users Manual in the film Elio (2025). Peterson also voiced Chick Hicks in Cars 3 since Chick's original voice actor Michael Keaton was unavailable to reprise the role.

Peterson conceived Pixar's The Good Dinosaur (2015) and served as the film's director until exiting the project in August 2013. He created, wrote, and directed two short-form series: Forky Asks a Question (2019–20) and Dug Days (2021–23).

In August 2015, Peterson voiced a dog named Derby for an E:60 profile on ESPN that chronicled the Trenton Thunder's minor league baseball team's tradition of using bat dogs.

== Filmography ==
=== Feature films ===
Year	Title	Director	Writer	Voice Actor	Pixar Senior Creative Team	Other	Voice Role	Notes
1995	Toy Story	No	No	No	No	Yes		Additional Animation and Layout
1998	A Bug's Life	No	No	No	No	Yes		Story Artist
1999	Toy Story 2	No	No	No	No	Yes		Story Artist
2001	Monsters, Inc.	No	No	Yes	No	Yes	Roz	Story Supervisor, Additional Story Material
2003	Finding Nemo	No	Screenplay	Yes	No	No	Mr. Ray / Pelican / Dolphin	
2004	The Incredibles	No	No	Additional	No	No	Oliver Sansweet's Lawyer	
2006	Cars	No	No	Additional	No	No	Wide Chick Pitty	
2007	Ratatouille	No	No	No	No	Yes		Additional Story Material
2008	WALL-E	No	No	No	Yes	No		
2009	Up	Co-Director	Yes	Yes	Yes	No	Dug / Alpha	
2010	Toy Story 3	No	No	Additional	Yes	No	Janitor	
2011	Cars 2	No	No	No	Yes	No		
2012	Brave	No	No	No	Yes	No		
2013	Monsters University	No	No	Yes	Yes	No	Roz	
2015	Inside Out	No	No	No	Yes	Yes		Additional Dialogue
2015	The Good Dinosaur	Removed	Story	No	Yes	Yes		Original Concept and Development, Additional Production Leadership
2016	Finding Dory	No	No	Yes	Yes	Yes	Mr. Ray / Additional Voices	Additional Screenplay Material
2017	Cars 3	No	Screenplay	Yes	Yes	No	Chick Hicks / Dr. Damage	Replacing Michael Keaton
2017	Coco	No	No	No	Yes	Yes		Story Consultant
2018	Incredibles 2	No	No	No	Yes	No		
2019	Toy Story 4	No	No	Additional	Yes	No	Additional Voices	
2020	Onward	No	No	No	Yes	Yes		Special Thanks
2020	Soul	No	No	No	Yes	Yes		Additional Story Contributions
2021	Luca	No	No	No	Yes	Yes		Additional Story Contributions
2022	Turning Red	No	No	No	Yes	No		
2022	Lightyear	No	No	No	Yes	No		
2023	Elemental	No	No	No	Yes	No		
2024	Inside Out 2	No	No	No	Yes	No		
2025	Elio	No	No	Yes	No	No	Universal Users Manual	
2026	Hoppers	No	No	No	No	Yes		Special Thanks
2026	Toy Story 5	No	No	No	No	Yes		Special Thanks

=== Short films ===
Year	Title	Director	Writer	Story Artist	Other	Voice Role
1997	Geri's Game	No	No	No	Yes	Geri
2003	Exploring the Reef	No	Yes	No	No	
2008	Cars Toons: Mater's Tall Tales	No	No	No	Yes	Additional Voices
2009	Dug's Special Mission	No	Yes	No	Yes	Alpha and Dug
2009	George and A.J.	No	No	No	Yes	Dug
2016	Marine Life Interviews	No	Yes	No	No	
2017	Miss Fritter's Racing Skoool	No	No	No	Yes	Dr. Damage
2019–20	Forky Asks a Question	Yes	Yes	No	Yes	Voice Over Announcer
2021–23	Dug Days	Yes	Yes	Carl's Date	Yes	Dug (all episodes) and Alpha (Carl's Date)

=== Television ===
Year	Title	Voice Role	Notes
2021–24	Monsters at Work	Roz, Roze, Bob "Dentures" Peterson	Creative Consultant (season 1) Special Thanks (season 2)
2025	Monsters Funday Football	Roz	alternate telecast of Monday Night Football
2027	Cars: Lightning Racers	Chick Hicks	

=== Video games ===
Year	Title	Voice Role
2001	Monsters, Inc. Scream Team Training	Roz
2001	Monsters, Inc. Scream Team	Roz
2002	Monsters, Inc.	Roz
2003	Finding Nemo	Mr. Ray/Krill
2009	Up	Dug/Alpha/Newsreel Announcer
2012	Kinect Rush: A Disney-Pixar Adventure	Dug

=== Other credits ===
Year	Title	Role
2000	For the Birds	Thanks
2008	Presto	Special Thanks
2009	Tracy	Terry Cane
2009	George and A.J.	Special Thanks
2011	Toy Story Toons: Small Fry	Special Thanks
2017	Lou	Special Thanks
2019	Purl	Kristen Lester's Story Trust
2020	Lamp Life	Special Thanks
2020	Burrow	Special Thanks
