= Riley's First Date? =

2015 Pixar short film

- Film poster
- Directed by: Josh Cooley
- Written by: Josh Cooley
- Story by: Yung-han Chang; Bobby Alcio Rubio
- Produced by: Mark Nielsen
- Starring: Kaitlyn Dias; Diane Lane; Kyle MacLachlan
- Edited by: Jason Brodkey
- Music by: Michael Giacchino
- Production company: Pixar Animation Studios
- Distributed by: Walt Disney Studios; Home Entertainment
- Release dates: August 14, 2015 (D23 Expo); November 3, 2015; (with Inside Out Blu-ray)
- Running time: 5 minutes
- Country: United States
- Language: English

Riley's First Date? is a 2015 animated romantic comedy short film produced by Pixar Animation Studios. It was written and directed by Josh Cooley. The short premiered on August 14, 2015, at the D23 Expo in Anaheim, California, and was included in the October 13 Digital HD release of Inside Out (2015), as well as the November 3 Blu-ray release. Riley's First Date? follows the events of Inside Out and involves Riley's parents and their emotions, suspecting that Riley is going out on a date with a boy named Jordan.

== Plot ==
Riley, now being 12 years old, is relaxing with her parents Jill and Bill at home when a school friend, a boy named Jordan (seen briefly at the end of Inside Out), shows up to go skating with her and her friends. Riley's parents suspect their daughter is going out on a date, and their emotions react hysterically to this assumption. Jill unsuccessfully attempts to get the information out of Riley by using slang she believes children her age would use, to her and her emotions' chagrin. Meanwhile, Bill tries to intimidate and interrogate Jordan. His patience wanes with Jordan's absentmindedness, which he and his emotions believe is backtalk, and he almost expels Jordan from the house when Jordan mentions he is the bass player in a band. Riley's father recalls his own memories of being in a band as lead guitarist, and the two begin to bond over their shared love of AC/DC. Riley comes downstairs to see her father and Jordan dancing to AC/DC's "Back in Black", knocking over a table and some chairs in the process. Embarrassed, Riley quickly rushes Jordan out the door as her parents watch, concluding that Jordan is good-natured and feeling nostalgic about their own love. Riley's parents share a kiss, which causes Bill's emotions to rejoice once again to "Back in Black." In a post-credits scene, Jill's emotions enjoy the kiss to Berlin's "Take My Breath Away". After a moment, she breaks off the kiss, and Bill goes to fix the table he knocked over.

== Voice cast ==
- Amy Poehler as Joy
- Phyllis Smith as Sadness
- Bill Hader as Fear and Jordan's Joy
- Lewis Black as Anger
- Mindy Kaling as Disgust
- Kaitlyn Dias as Riley Andersen
- Diane Lane as Jill Andersen
- Kyle MacLachlan as Bill Andersen
- Ben Cox as Jordan
- Sherry Lynn as Jill's Joy and Jill's Disgust
- Lori Alan as Jill's Sadness
- Laraine Newman as Jill's Fear
- Paula Pell as Jill's Anger. Pell voiced Dream Director in Inside Out.
- Patrick Seitz as Bill's Joy
- Josh Cooley as Bill's Sadness. Cooley voiced Jangles the Clown in Inside Out.
- Pete Docter as Bill's Anger
- Carlos Alazraqui as Bill's Fear
- Flea as Jordan's Fear. Flea voiced Mind Worker Cop Jake in Inside Out.
- Mona Marshall as Jordan's Disgust
- Gregg Berger as Jordan's Anger
- Keith Ferguson as Jordan's Sadness and Bill's Disgust

== Production ==
If this kid just shows up and dad has no idea who he is, your mind goes crazy. 'Who is this person? What are they doing here?' Already the voices in your head are talking.

— Josh Cooley, summing up how the plot was created.

During the final year of Inside Out's production, Pixar got together to discuss a short based on the film. According to Josh Cooley, "We had so much fun with the boy at the end of the movie that I wanted to put them in a situation and see what would happen there. I treated Riley's First Date? as if you were just watching more of Inside Out."

Given most of Pixar's crew are fathers with daughters, and that Inside Out editor, Kevin Nolting, stated at the meeting that "Just wait until the first boy shows up", the plot was then developed into how Riley's parents would react to the boy, now named Jordan.

Cooley started off from a personal anecdote, as the first time he met his father-in-law: "he was a little standoffish" until Cooley told he was in a band, and both started to connect as the father-in-law played drums. Jordan's emotional immaturity was played for comedy and also in how "boys are behind. It felt right to have him be catching up, to have his mind act like a kid does."

Riley's First Date? was done in about ten months, employing the same character models and scenery from the feature, to the point the same camera shot is used in the take where Riley's mother's head is visited.

While exploring various song choices, the producers eventually settled on AC/DC, which Cooley considered a band that connected generations: "I went to their concert and there was a seven-year-old in front of me and an eighty-year-old behind me".

== Reception ==
CineMagazine rated the short 4 stars.
