= Mike's New Car =

- Film poster
- Directed by: Pete Docter; Roger L. Gould
- Written by: Pete Docter; Jeff Pidgeon; Roger L. Gould; Rob Gibbs
- Produced by: Gale Gortney
- Starring: Billy Crystal; John Goodman
- Edited by: Robert Grahamjones
- Music by: Randy Newman
- Production company: Pixar Animation Studios
- Distributed by: Walt Disney Home Entertainment
- Release dates: September 17, 2002 (with Monsters, Inc. DVD and VHS)
- Running time: 5 minutes
- Country: United States
- Language: English

Mike's New Car is a 2002 American animated comedy short film, starring the protagonists from Pixar's Monsters, Inc., Mike Wazowski and James P. "Sulley" Sullivan. Directed by Pete Docter and Roger L. Gould, it is the first Pixar short to use dialogue and the first to take characters and situations from a previously established work.

The short premiered on September 17, 2002, and was included in the DVD and VHS release of Monsters, Inc. It was nominated for a 2002 Academy Award for Best Animated Short Film.

== Plot ==
After the events of Monsters, Inc., Mike buys a new six-wheel drive car and shows it to Sulley, who is confused about what happened to his old car. Once inside the car, Sulley tries to make himself comfortable with the adjustable power seat. He starts to play with it until Mike annoyingly snaps at him to stop. After Mike starts the engine, the seatbelt reminder sound chimes.

Although Sulley buckles up easily, Mike realizes that his seatbelt is stuck. He accidentally locks himself out of the car while attempting to unstick it. He instructs Sulley to push the door unlock button in order for him to reenter, but Sulley, who is confused by the massive amount of buttons on the dashboard, pushes the one that opens the hood instead.

Mike tries to close the hood but it is too high for him to reach. When Sulley tries to help, he accidentally closes it on Mike's fingers. He helps Mike get free by pushing the button again, but he accidentally sends him flying onto the engine motors and has him trapped inside the engine compartment after the hood closes. Mike calls Sulley on his cell phone to open the hood again, letting him escape and close the hood.

When Mike reenters the car, the seatbelt reminder sound still chimes. He manages to put his seatbelt on but the windshield wipers randomly turn on. Sulley tries to push a button, but Mike tells him not to touch anything. Mike pushes a button that loudly plays Latin music. When he pushes more buttons, it launches the car into chaotic malfunction.

Mike ends the chaos by pulling the key out of the ignition. Sulley tries to realign the rearview mirror but he accidentally breaks it, causing Mike to force him out of the car before speeding away, resulting in its destruction. When Sulley realizes that the airbag did not go off, it bursts afterwards. Mike is sent flying but he is caught by Sulley before admitting that he misses his old car.

During the credits, Mike reminisces about his old car before agreeing to walk to work.

== Voice cast ==
- Billy Crystal: Mike
- John Goodman: Sulley

== Home media ==
Mike's New Car was released on September 17, 2002, attached as a bonus feature on the Monsters, Inc. DVD and VHS release. The DVD release features commentary by "Docter and Gould", which turn out to be the directors' young children, Nicholas Docter and Liam Gould. The short was also released on November 10, 2009, on the Monsters, Inc. Blu-ray.
