= 22 vs. Earth =

2021 animated short film by Pixar

- Official poster
- Directed by: Kevin Nolting
- Written by: Josh Cooley
- Produced by: Lourdes Marquez Alba
- Starring: Tina Fey; Richard Ayoade; Alice Braga
- Cinematography: Andy Grisdale; Luke Martorelli
- Edited by: Noah Newman
- Music by: Trent Reznor; Atticus Ross
- Production company: Pixar Animation Studios
- Distributed by: Disney+
- Release date: April 30, 2021
- Running time: 6 minutes
- Country: United States
- Language: English

22 vs. Earth is a 2021 American animated short film produced by Pixar Animation Studios. Directed by Kevin Nolting and written by Josh Cooley, the short stars 22, a character who originated in the 2020 Pixar feature film Soul, as she forms a short-lived rebel alliance to stop souls from reaching Earth. It was released on Disney+ on April 30, 2021.

== Plot ==
Prior to the events of Soul, 22 unsuccessfully attempts to dissuade a fellow soul from leaving the Great Before and going to Earth. Resenting Earth for taking away every friend she has ever had, 22 decides to abduct five souls and indoctrinate them into a secret resistance movement called the "APOCALYPSE" (Anonymous Provocateurs and Other Culprits that are Against Leaving Your friends to go to Pathetic Stupid Earth).

To stop others from finding their inspiration, 22 leads the other five souls (whom she nicknames Macaroni, Zimmy, Peanut, D-Pac, and Moonbeam), but her recruits quickly find theirs and leave for Earth. Soon the only remaining recruit is Macaroni, who gives 22 a hug as her only remaining friend, but their devotion completes their inspiration. 22 throws Macaroni to Earth, vowing that Earth will never take her like it has taken her friends.

The two soul counselors observe 22 and wonder when she will go to Earth and discover the meaning of life. One of them asks what that meaning is, but the other's response is cut off by the closing credits.

In a post-credits scene, the soul counselor is seen having learned the meaning of life, stating their feelings of being underwhelmed.

== Cast ==
- Tina Fey as 22
- Alice Braga and Richard Ayoade as two soul counselors in the Great Before who are each named Jerry
- Juliana Alcorn as New Soul
- Micah Chen as Moonbeam
- Adela Drabek as Peanut
- Aiyanna Miorin as Zimmy
- Karee Ducharme as Macaroni
- Samantha Ho as D-Pac
- Azriel Dalman as Neptune
- Angelica Pascoe (voice)

== Production ==
According to 22 vs. Earth director Kevin Nolting, who also served as the editor for Soul, the short was created to provide an explanation for why 22 did not want to go to Earth. He defined the short film by saying, "if we were making a movie about her, [22 vs. Earth] would be the mid-point and Soul would be the third act". Soul director Pete Docter instructed Nolting to make the short "more kid-friendly" than what Nolting was used to making.

== Reception ==
Gray Houser of Monorail News praised the short, calling it "laugh out loud" and "perfect", while seeing potential for a series of short films following 22 in the Great Before. Jinal Bhatt of Hauterrfly awarded the film four out of five stars, calling it "a nice little insight into why 22 is a loner and despises Earth so much". Tanzim Pardiwalla of Mashable rated the film 3.5/5, saying that while the short did not answer many questions, it was a welcome addition to Soul.
