= Dug's Special Mission =

2009 American film

- Title screen
- Directed by: Ronnie del Carmen
- Written by: Ronnie del Carmen; Bob Peterson
- Based on: Characters by Pete Docter
- Produced by: Galyn Susman
- Starring: Bob Peterson; Delroy Lindo; Jerome Ranft
- Narrated by: Bob Peterson
- Edited by: Steve Bloom
- Music by: Michael Giacchino
- Production company: Pixar Animation Studios
- Distributed by: Walt Disney Studios; Home Entertainment
- Release date: November 10, 2009 (with Up Blu-ray/DVD)
- Running time: 4:40
- Country: United States
- Language: English

Dug's Special Mission is a 2009 American animated short film, directed by Ronnie del Carmen. It is tied into and included on the Blu-ray/DVD releases of Up and Pixar Short Films Collection: Volume 2.

According to Jonas Rivera, the producer of Pixar's film Up, Dug's Special Mission "is a little bit of the backstory of what Dug was actually doing out there on this mysterious mission when we meet him [in Up]". In the short, Dug is instructed on how to catch the bird (which he names Kevin) by Alpha, Beta, and Gamma, but their instructions are really intended to keep Dug away from them.

== Plot ==
The short is set during the events of Up. It is Dug's birthday. This ordinary Golden Retriever wishes that it will be the happiest day of his life, when suddenly, Kevin runs over him and the pack leaders – Alpha (a Doberman Pinscher), Beta (a Rottweiler) and Gamma (a Bulldog) – run into Dug. Irritated with Dug for getting in their way, they come up with "special missions" for Dug to help capture the bird. However, these are just plots to keep Dug out of their way.

First, Alpha assigns Dug to watch a large rock and make sure it doesn't move, because it is "the bird's favorite rock". Dug accidentally causes a pebble to roll down an incline and topple the large boulder, which nearly crushes Alpha, Beta, and Gamma.

Next, Dug is told to sit in a hole, which Alpha claims is the "bird's favorite hole," and not to leave it. Dug sits in it, but the sand he's sitting on is quicksand; he and the sand land on Alpha, Beta, and Gamma at the spot where they were trying to catch the bird.

Dug is then assigned to sit on a rock; when he jumps onto the rock, following Alpha's orders, Alpha, Beta, Gamma, and the rock they're standing on all start to fall. Numerous scenes follow of Alpha, Beta, and Gamma getting caught or captured by traps intended for Kevin, due to actions of Dug as a result of commands given to him by Alpha: Alpha tells Dug to stand aside, in which they get trapped in a net, Alpha tells Dug to move, but Dug accidentally steps on a pebble, which fires tranquilizer darts (one of them hits Beta), last, Dug and the dogs step on tall rock statues, but they all fall over. Dug, Beta and Gamma make it, but Alpha falls down with the statues.

Angered, Alpha vows revenge on Dug, contacting Charles F. Muntz in his airship to report that Dug has prevented them from catching the bird. Dug suddenly sees Muntz's Spirit of Adventure dirigible in the sky. Fearful of how Muntz will punish him, Dug runs away and stumbles into a mist-laden rocky area. Beta sarcastically tells Dug to have a happy birthday. He sees a rock that resembles a turtle, followed by one that looks like a man. When he hears a voice saying "I see you back there," he asks if the man is okay. Dug then realizes that he has received his birthday wish: a new master (Carl Fredricksen). The clouds clear, the sun comes out, and Dug sits proudly on a flat rock. From here, the short comes full circle, reflecting the point when Dug is introduced in the film; Russell notices him and briefly thinks Dug is a rock. After the credits are shown, Dug is told to speak; he replies "Hi there!," surprising Carl and Russell.

== Cast ==
- Bob Peterson as Dug and Alpha
- Delroy Lindo as Beta
- Jerome Ranft as Gamma

Ed Asner and Jordan Nagai make uncredited cameo appearances as Carl Fredricksen and Russell, respectively.

== Production ==
Ronnie del Carmen explained "Dug was created very early in the development of the movie idea, even earlier than Russell", but little was known about his character on top of his supporting role, such as how or why he spoke. It was kept this way in Up because the writers wanted to keep the focus on Carl. After further developing Dug, it was decided that stories could be told about him beyond the film due to his lovable personality. The purpose of Dug's Special Mission was to tell Dug's story, as he "arrives in Up talking about being on a special mission, and we never talked about it again in the movie", which made Carmen inquisitive. He worked with Pete Docter and Bob Peterson on the film, and noted "their involvement was crucial since the three of us were always part of telling the larger story of the movie", and so they had similar sensibilities toward the Up universe. While Docter offered suggestions on the direction the short could go, Peterson provided insight into how Dug should be animated through his "funny nuances" because, Carmen explains, "as animators we gravitate to communicating visually and through behavior". Peterson was the person who created, voiced, and wrote most of Dug, and during the recording he improvised and experimented, with many of these humorous takes ending up in the final film. Carmen noted "there were many lines and quips that Bob Peterson did during recording that I could have used but had to leave out." An extra reference for the animation was Carmen's own German Shepherd when he was growing up. Added inspiration for the Dug scenes came from various Pixar crew members, including John Lasseter.

Carmen wrote the story and dialogue for Dug's Special Mission. He "had the idea for the short as soon as the movie was in production, right around the layout phase [and] storyboarded a rough version quickly and pitched it to Jonas Rivera and Pete Docter around late spring 2008". He assumed once finishing working on the story for Up, he could move into a short. However, the third act of the film ran into plot issues, causing him to simultaneously remain on the staff to iron these out, start work on the short, and illustrate a tie-in book My Name Is Dug (about Dug searching for the bird, which was described as "a great companion to Dug's Special Mission because both happen before Carl and Russell show up"). Project approval for the short was given by Disney during January 2009, and production ended in June of that year. A favourite scene that Carmen fought for (though it was eventually cut) was where "Dug falls into an airplane and flies it down to the other dogs, dive bomber style", as they wanted to ensure every frame of animation was used efficiently. As the short takes place in the events leading up to Carl and Russel finding Doug, a scene that takes place in the main feature, so the ending has "Carl and Russell's dialogue and acting [being] lifted from Up, because deviating from that would affect continuity and make it more expensive. The music was restricted to the score that Michael Giacchino had already written for the movie. Another challenge was "working with the time constraint of making a film that's only 4.5 minutes".

On the prospect of further Up-related shorts, Carmen said "'I definitely would love to do the continuing stories of Dug. I had a scene in the original storyboard of Dug's Special Mission that had him flying an airplane. We cut it because of the length, and it seemed out of place with the other gags. But I still want to see him in a plane someday. There are stories in my head that tell how he got into Muntz's pack. Dug in that pack looks like a mistake – an oversight. I would love to tell that earlier story of how he got there. Certainly Muntz and Dug, Russell and Dug... Carl and Dug too!"

== Critical reception ==
In a review of Pixar Short Films Collection: Volume 2, Common Sense Media notes "There is some mild cartoonish violence in a few of the shorts, but it's of the slapstick variety that is more humorous than upsetting (like when a rock nearly flattens the dogs in Dug's Special Mission)". Total Film said "All are fun in their own derivative right, Dug's Special Mission particularly for its insights into Up's fractious canine relations." DVD Talk wrote "Burn-E and Dug's Special Mission play out more like deleted scenes than anything else". IGN said "kids and adults alike should enjoy the Looney Tunes-inspired cartoon that finds the hapless Dug trying to earn the respect of his pack." CBBC said "it's great".
