= George and A.J. =

- Poster
- Directed by: Josh Cooley
- Written by: Josh Cooley
- Produced by: Galyn Susman; Pete Docter (executive); Jonas Rivera (executive)
- Starring: Jason Topolski; A.J. Riebli III; Steve Purcell; Peter Sohn; Bob Peterson
- Edited by: Tim Fox; Jon Vargo (assistant editor)
- Music by: Michael Giacchino
- Production company: Pixar Animation Studios
- Distributed by: Walt Disney Studios; Home Entertainment
- Release date: November 12, 2009
- Running time: 4 minutes
- Country: United States
- Language: English

George and A.J. is a 2009 American animated short film, directed and written by Josh Cooley which uses characters from the film Up. Taking place during the events of the film, it follows what nurses George and A.J. did after Carl Fredricksen left with his house tied to balloons. Due to its budget, all of the animation was done in a limited "storyboard" style, with some objects moving by keyframes, while other things like characters and their mouths barely move at all; however, the characters' expressions and the story are still conveyed.

== Plot ==
The short starts out with a scene from Up, where two nurses from the Shady Oaks Retirement Village knock on Carl Fredricksen's door to escort him to the nursing home. As seen in the film, Carl instead takes off in his house, while Russell braces himself underneath it. George and A.J. stare dumbfounded at the sky while their van's alarm goes off (it had been bumped by Carl's house).

They continue to stare dumbfounded when they return to the van, and in bed during the night. The next day, a news reporter does a story about sightings of a floating house. She attempts to get George and A.J.'s opinion, but they are still staring dumbfounded. Meanwhile, other senior citizens around the city, including at Shady Oaks, are watching the news report and celebrating Carl's "escape".

A week later, George and A.J. are back at their task of escorting elderly citizens to Shady Oaks in their van. Unfortunately, the seniors have been inspired by Carl in performing similar ideas, and every time George and A.J. come to a house to take a person away, the senior living there escapes with their house somehow. Finally, they arrive back at the Shady Oaks Retirement Village, only to find an old man outside the door who yells "So long, suckers!" and hits his cane against one of many canisters attached to the outside of the building; the other canisters soon follow and spew out a powerful gas. After the man goes inside, the entire building launches into the sky. Still dumbstruck, George and A.J. stare up. A few canisters fall down, and one lands on their van, setting off its alarm again. Suddenly, from behind them, a giant blimp starts to descend. It turns out to be Charles Muntz's Spirit of Adventure dirigible, and Carl is flying it with Russell next to him. The airship lands on top of the van, crushing it and causing to effectively stop its alarm. Carl and Russell climb out, and George incredulously says "Mr. Fredricksen?" They walk past the nurses, and Russell mentions that next time he would like to steer. A.J. turns to George and says, "That was the craziest thing I've ever seen!" They look down to find Dug in front of them. Dug speaks "Hi there!" through his translation collar, and George and A.J. are even more shocked than before.

== Cast ==
- Jason Topolski as George
- A.J. Riebli III as A.J.
- Steve Purcell as Carl Fredricksen
- Peter Sohn as Russell
- Bob Peterson as Dug
- Kim Donovan as Reporter
- Claire Munzer as Old Lady
- Valerie LaPointe as Mrs. Peterson

== Home media ==
Instead of being released on DVD like Partly Cloudy, Dug's Special Mission, or any other Pixar short film, George and A.J. was initially released on iTunes as an extra feature that came with a purchase of the film. It was later released to fans of Disney/Pixar on their Facebook page and later to the official Disney/Pixar YouTube page. It was later released on Pixar Short Films Collection Volume 2 and is available to stream on Disney+ as of January 2026.

The short also features a humorous commentary track in which Josh Cooley gives up in the first 30 seconds and asks Tom Kane to make it sound more exciting. Unfortunately for Cooley, Kane begins to make up epic false facts about the film to of which Cooley is annoyed by.

== Reception ==
Animation Views said, "As flippant with the film’s core idea as it is funny, this was an online “extra” for a long while, animated with a budgetary concern (perhaps it was a proposal for the disc’s extra short before Dug’s Mission was chosen instead?) in a limited color storyboard animatic style."
