= Smith Brothers =

Brand of cough drops

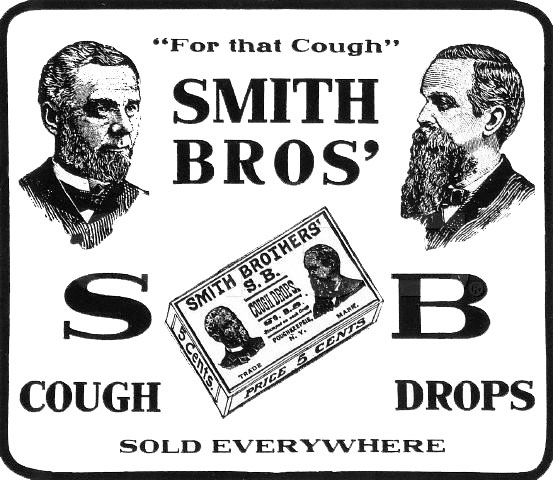
Smith Brothers

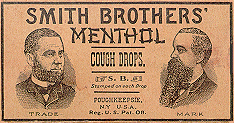
Smith Brothers menthol introduced in 1922

The Smith Brothers were makers of the first cough drops produced and advertised in the United States, becoming one of the most famous brands in the country in its day.

== History ==
William Wallace Smith I (1830–1913) and Andrew Smith (1836–1895) were the sons of James Smith (c. 1800–1866) of Poughkeepsie, New York. James' family had emigrated from Fife, Scotland, to Canada in 1831, and James from St. Armand, Quebec, to the U.S. in 1847.

In New York, James opened an ice cream shop called "James Smith and Son." James Smith bought a cough drop recipe from a journeyman peddler named Sly Hawkins and in 1852 made his first batch of "Smith Brothers Cough Drops". The September 24, 1934 issue of Time Magazine featured the story on the rise of the Smith Brothers.

William and Andrew took over the business after their father died in 1866.

Originally the drops were sold from glass jars on countertops. To prevent drug stores from selling generic versions the company began packaging drops in branded boxes in 1872. To distinguish their drops from imitators, the bearded brothers created a logo featuring their portraits and stamped it on their boxes. When the logo was trademarked in 1877 the word "Trade" appeared under the picture of William and the word "Mark" under Andrew's. As a result, the brothers became known as Trade and Mark, nicknames that stick to this day.

Of the brothers, William Smith was dominant, community-minded and a prohibitionist. He was known for such quirks as keeping financial records on the backs of used envelopes. He ran for public office several times and was a generous local philanthropist who assessed his brother Andrew for half of all charitable donations whether he knew of them or not.

Andrew, on the other hand, was known as the more amiable brother and not a tee-totaller.

The company's staunch defense of its trademark made the Smiths' faces among the most famous in America, the subject of editorials, comics, and cultural references.

Andrew Smith died in 1895, and William continued as company president until he died in 1913. William was succeeded by his son, Arthur G. Smith (c1875-1936), who expanded the company by adding menthol drops in 1922, cough syrup in 1926, and wild cherry drops in 1948. Arthur G. Smith had two sons: William Wallace Smith II (1888–1955) and Robert Lansing Smith (1891–1962). William Wallace Smith II was born in Poughkeepsie N.Y.

== Sales ==
In 1963, the Smith family sold the company to Warner-Lambert.

F & F Foods of Chicago purchased it in 1972 and production left Poughkeepsie. The iconic Smith Brothers logo was diminished in favor of the F&F Foods logo and the brothers' name recognition declined.

Though the product became scarce, it continued to make appearances in pop culture references such as the season 1, 1986 of The Golden Girls episode, "The Flu”. Rose politely declines a Sucrets cough drop from her date, and tells him that she's “sucking on a Smith Brothers”. In the 1997 Seinfeld episode "The Van Buren Boys", Jerry references "Smith Brothers cough drops" in a discussion about thick beards. Later in the 2009 Simpsons episode, "O Brother, Where Bart Thou?". The expression, "When the Smith Brothers shave..." was used in popular culture to mean something that was never expected to happen. In Victor Herbert's 1906 operetta The Red Mill, two heavily bearded men appear on stage, while one of the Vaudevillians yells, "Pipe the Smith Brothers!" Smith Brothers cough drops also get a prominent reference in Laurel and Hardy's 1932 comedy, Pack Up Your Troubles, when Stan makes a trip to Poughkeepsie to see if one of the Smith Brothers is the father of their deceased friend Eddie Smith, whose orphaned daughter was left in their care and until the pair could return her to relatives. In the 1963 film Beach Party, the character Deadhead suggests that if the bearded Professor Sutwell had a twin he'd make a good cough drop.

In 2011, F & F sold the brand to GemCap, a private equity fund in Santa Monica, California.

In 2014, GemCap sold the company to hedge fund York Capital Management, who once again attempted to revive the brand which had largely disappeared from store shelves. However, in 2016, the Smith brothers cough drop brand folded due to declining sales. Smith Brothers Cough Drops remained available on some retail shelves and online sources, due to previously purchased unexpired back stock.

== Comeback ==
In May 2016, Lanes Brands of Bedford, New Hampshire, acquired the Smith Brothers brand. Lanes is the United States subsidiary of Lanes Health based in Gloucester, United Kingdom. According to the Lane Brands website, the Smith Brothers brand of cough drops returned to the American and worldwide markets later in 2017. According to the homepage of the company website, the cough drop flavors Black Licorice, Honey Lemon, Wild Cherry and Warm Apple Pie cough drop flavors were being offered again in the form of packets filled with sealed drops, and two tee-shirts, with the former flavor Menthol Eucalyptus, and the classic small boxes of cough drops not yet available.

In July 2021, Lanes Brands appointed BT Remedies LLC of Trevose, PA the exclusive importer and marketer of Jakemans Throat & Chest Lozenges and Smith Bros. Throat Drops. At that time, Lanes Brands closed its US offices. According to the Smith Brothers website, it currently has four flavors available: Honey Lemon, Wild Cherry, Warm Apple Pie and Black Licorice, and all products are offered for sale on the company website. The cough drops are offered in zipper-sealed bags filled with 30 wrapped drops.

== Timeline ==
- 1830 Birth of William Wallace Smith I
- 1831 Emigration of Smith family from Scotland to Canada
- 1836 Birth of Andrew Smith
- 1847 Emigration from Canada to Poughkeepsie, New York
- 1852 Cough drops advertised in newspapers
- 1866 Death of James Smith
- 1870 Trademark bill defeated
- 1872 Prepackaged cough drops introduced
- 1876 Trademarks recognized
- 1877 Smith Brothers trademark registered
- 1888 William Wallace Smith II born
- 1891 Birth of Robert Lansing Smith
- 1894 Death of Andrew Smith
- 1913 Death of William Wallace Smith I
- 1922 Menthol drops introduced
- 1926 Cough syrup introduced
- 1936 Death of Arthur G. Smith
- 1948 Wild cherry drops introduced
- 1955 Death of William Wallace Smith II
- 1962 Death of Robert Lansing Smith
- 1964 Brand is sold to Warner-Lambert
- 1977 Manufacturing moved to Chicago, Illinois
- 2016 The Smith Brothers brand is acquired by Lanes Brands, the United States subsidiary of Lanes Health in Gloucester, United Kingdom
- 2017 Lane Brands, New Hampshire subsidiary, brings the Smith Brothers Cough Drops line back to retail shelves
- 2021 BT Remedies LLC appointed as the exclusive marketer of Smith Brothers
