= Jeff Pidgeon =

American animator

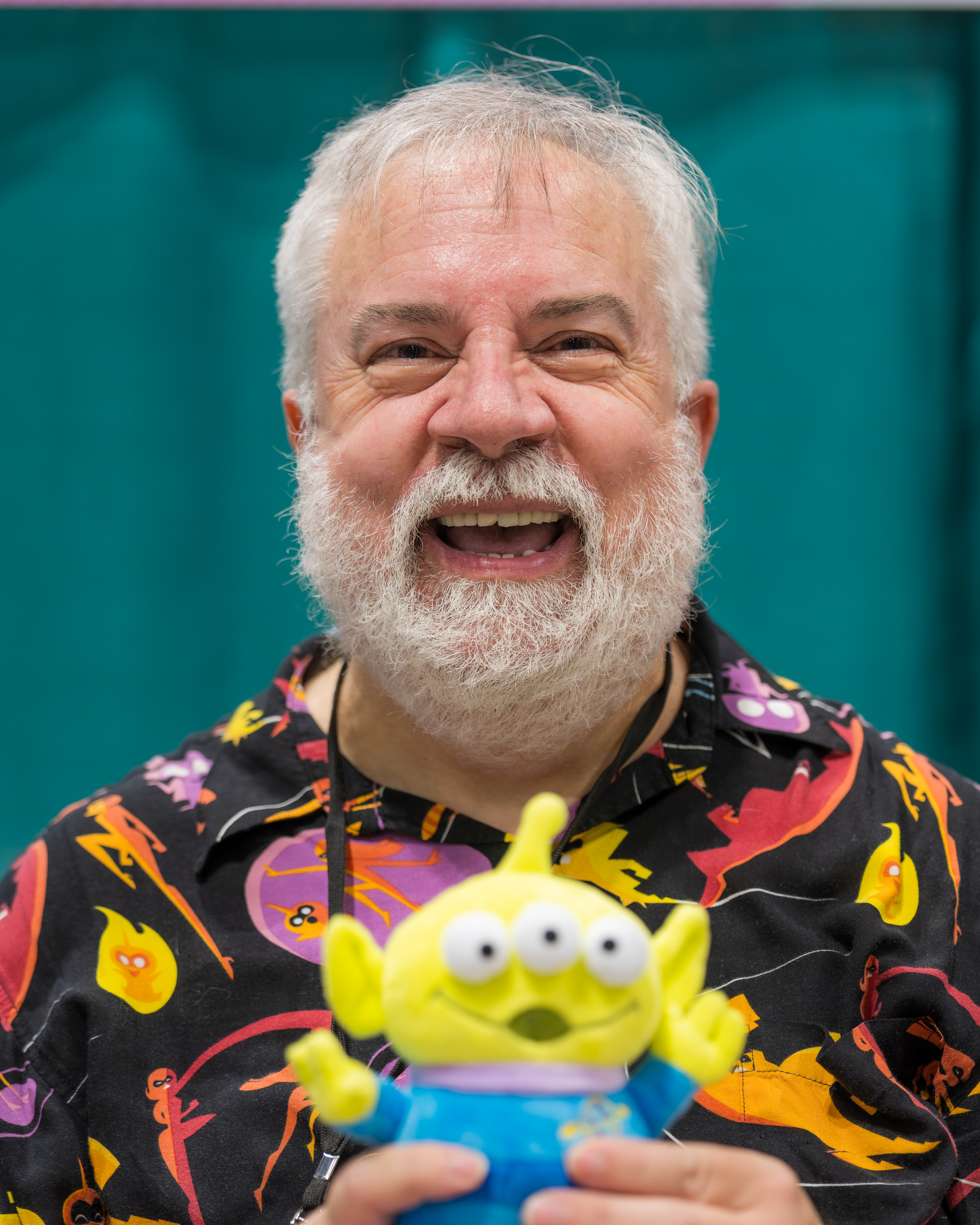
- Pidgeon at Animate! Orlando in 2026
- Education: California Institute of the Arts
- Occupations: Animator; screenwriter; storyboard artist; voice actor
- Years active: 1981–present
- Employer: Pixar (1991–2024)
- Notable work: Toy Story (1995); Toy Story 2 (1999); Monsters, Inc. (2001); Toy Story 3 (2010); Toy Story 4 (2019); Toy Story 5 (2026)
- Spouse: Anita Coulter (m. 2005)

Jeff Pidgeon is an American animator, screenwriter, storyboard artist and voice actor, formerly at Pixar.

== Early life ==
Influenced by Charles M. Schulz's comic strip Peanuts, Jeff Pidgeon dreamed of becoming a newspaper cartoonist. He studied and graduated with a BFA degree from the California Institute of the Arts. He currently lives in Northern California.

== Career ==
In 1991, he began working for Pixar Animation Studios, where he worked as a writer, animator, and voice actor for 32 years. He has worked behind the scenes on films such as FernGully: The Last Rainforest, Toy Story, A Bug's Life, Toy Story 2, Monsters, Inc., and WALL-E, as well as many US TV shows. He also provided the voice for the "Aliens" in the Toy Story films and the Toy Story Toons short, Hawaiian Vacation. Pidgeon was laid off by The Walt Disney Company as part of an ongoing company-wide restructuring in July 2024.

He is the designer of Hamton J. Pig in Tiny Toon Adventures.

Pidgeon has also manufactured his own toys.

== Filmography ==
=== Production work ===
- Toy Story 5 (2026) - Story artist
- Turning Red (2022) - Additional storyboard artist
- Toy Story 4 (2019) - Story artist
- Monsters University (2013) - Story artist
- Toy Story 3 (2010) - Story artist
- Up (2009) - Story artist
- WALL-E (2008) - Story artist
- Your Friend the Rat (2007) - Writer
- Lifted (2006) - Story artist
- Mike's New Car (2002) - Writer
- Monsters, Inc. (2001) - Original Story, Story artist
- Buzz Lightyear of Star Command (2000-2001) - Creative consultant
- Buzz Lightyear of Star Command: The Adventure Begins (2000) - Creative consultant
- Toy Story 2 (1999) - Story artist, additional story material
- A Bug's Life (1998) - additional storyboard artist
- Toy Story (1995) - Animator, story artist
- FernGully: The Last Rainforest (1992) - Additional character designer
- Taz-Mania (1991) - Animation layout artist, concept artist
- The Simpsons (1990-1991) - Character layout artist
- Tiny Toon Adventures (1990-1991) - Model designer, character layout artist
- Bart Simpson: Do the Bartman (1990) - Character layout artist
- The Butter Battle Book (1989) - Concept artist
- Hound Town (1989) - Character concept designer, layout artist
- Christmas in Tattertown (1988) - Character designer, layout artist
- Mighty Mouse: The New Adventures (1987-1988) - Character designer

=== Voice acting ===
- Hoppers (2026) - Beaverton Citizen, Owl, Deer
- Dug Days (2021) - Fly
- Forky Asks a Question (2020) - Mr. Spell
- Toy Story 4 (2019) - Aliens
- Kingdom Hearts III (2019) (video game) - Aliens
- Disney Infinity: Marvel Super Heroes (2014) (video game) - Aliens
- Disney Infinity (2013) (video game) - Aliens
- Monsters University (2013) - Additional Voices
- Kinect: Disneyland Adventures (2011) (video game) - Aliens
- Toy Story Toons: Hawaiian Vacation (2011) - Aliens
- Toy Story 3: The Video Game (2010) (video game) - Aliens
- Toy Story 3 (2010) - Aliens
- Toy Story Mania! (2009) (video game) - Aliens
- Tracy (2009) - Justin Pooge
- Up (2009) - Additional Voices
- WALL-E (2008) - Additional Voices
- Toy Story Midway Mania! (2008) - Aliens
- The Incredibles (2004) - Additional Voices
- Finding Nemo (2003) - Additional Voices
- Monsters, Inc (2001) - Bile
- Toy Story Racer (2001) (video game) - Little Green Man
- Buzz Lightyear of Star Command: The Adventure Begins (2000) - Toy Aliens
- Toy Story 2 (1999) - Aliens
- A Bug's Life (1998) - Grasshopper
- Toy Story Treats (1996) - Aliens
- Disney's Animated Storybook: Toy Story (1996) (video game) - Aliens
- Toy Story (1995) - Aliens/ Robot / Mr. Spell
- A Story (1987) - Ted / The Goon Squad
- Bring Me the Head of Charlie Brown (1986) - Great Pumpkin
- Somewhere in the Arctic (1986) - Uhk
