= Up (video game) =

2009 video game

- Developers: Heavy Iron Studios (PS3/X360/Wii); Asobo Studio (PS2/PSP/PC/Mac); Altron (DS)
- Publisher: THQ
- Director: Kirk Tome
- Producers: Brian Wiklem; Sonoko Ishioka
- Designers: Kraig Horigan; Matt Ekins
- Programmer: Chris Masterton
- Artists: Sean Ro; St. John Colon
- Writer: Randolph Heard
- Composer: Michael Giacchino (Note: Additional music by Chad Seiter and Andrea Datzman.)
- Platforms: iOS; Mac OS X; Microsoft Windows; Nintendo DS; PlayStation 2; PlayStation 3; PlayStation Portable; Wii; Xbox 360
- Release: NA: May 26, 2009; AU: August 27, 2009; EU: October 2, 2009; JP: December 3, 2009 (Note: Released exclusively on Nintendo platforms.)
- Genre: Action-adventure
- Modes: Single-player, multiplayer

Up is an action-adventure video game developed by Heavy Iron Studios and published by THQ. It is based on the Pixar film of the same name.

== Plot ==
The story centers on an elderly widower named Carl Fredricksen and an earnest young Wilderness Explorer named Russell who fly to South America in a house suspended by helium balloons.

The PlayStation 3, Wii and Xbox 360 versions of the game follow the film's plot more tightly, spanning eleven levels, with some liberties taken. The Microsoft Windows, Mac OS X, PlayStation 2 and PlayStation Portable versions of the game are a looser adaptation, in which Carl and Russell take detours through the jungle. Consequently, these versions of the game have over 20 levels.

== Gameplay ==
Up follows the storyline of the film, featuring Carl, Russell, and Dug walking through the jungles of Venezuela. All of the mentioned characters are playable in the game, and in all versions, the player must switch between them to take advantage of their unique abilities to overcome obstacles, while being careful to avoid injury as all playable characters (depending on the version) share a single health bar.

The PlayStation 3 version of the game was the first game based on a Pixar film to support the trophy system. This version and the Xbox 360 version feature online achievements themed after Wilderness Explorer badges. All versions feature multiplayer aerial combat in addition to the main story mode.

=== Version differences ===
The PlayStation 3, Wii and Xbox 360 versions of the game are fast-paced platformers with some puzzle scenarios. The Wii version is slightly different than the PlayStation 3 and Xbox 360 versions in that it uses more artfully rendered visuals to accommodate that system's graphical constraints (for example, rocks have purplish textures and the sky is represented with a cartoony skybox in the Wii version, while rocks have brownish, more realistic textures and the sky is represented by a fluid skydome in the PlayStation 3 and Xbox 360 versions). The Wii version also supports optional motion controls to perform certain actions, such as shaking the Wii Remote to launch rocks as missiles or tilting it down to reach over ledges to help a partner up. Carl and Russell can also use special abilities for a limited number of times to scare off or distract enemies or bosses, accessed by pressing certain directions of the directional pad. Cutscenes are presented in newsreel format, similar to Spotlight on Adventure in the film's first scene. Character health is measured discretely in these versions, and the characters' survivability gradually increases automatically as the game progresses. These versions also have the fewest bosses, which are simply a giant anaconda, a crocodile, and The Spirit of Adventure, Muntz's airship. There are two biplane sequences, one at the start of the game that takes place immediately before a final battle over Paradise Falls, and another for the actual battle, and in both of them, a second player can "man the guns" and fire at incoming enemies and ground artillery with an on-screen reticule, while sharing the first player's camera view. This feature also takes advantage of the Wii Remote pointer in the Wii version to control Player 2's reticule. Loading screens in these versions also displays hints and trivia about the real wildlife near the tepui.

The Microsoft Windows, Mac OS X, PlayStation 2 and PlayStation Portable versions of the game are longer, giving the player more opportunities to explore the various terrain atop the tepui as the characters take longer detours to reach their destination. At the beginning of these versions, the player is exclusively required to stop the house from floating away. These versions also exclusively feature side areas that cannot be accessed the first time around without acquiring a certain tool, as well as fast-moving linear levels (namely on-rails chase sequences played from a reverse angle or river canoeing courses), where players cannot backtrack and must carefully avoid accidents that instantly require a restart from a checkpoint. Health is measured in a continuous gauge. There are four bosses in these versions, which are three battles against some of Muntz's top dogs, along with The Spirit of Adventure.

The Nintendo DS version is only six levels long, but they usually consist of one or more large areas and players are required to have Carl and Russell together at the end of each level (and at the end of each part of some levels), which becomes a challenge as the characters are easily separated in this version. There is also a boss at the end of each level. Exclusively in this version, players must acquire and use certain tools to overcome obstacles (although the use of such tools is constrained by an energy meter), and are encouraged to finish levels as fast as possible, but must be careful not to arouse too much suspicion from Muntz's dogs, who patrol the jungle and will engage Carl and Russell in battle if they move around too often. A special time attack mode is available for each level that unlocks rare bugs for a collection. Characters also share a continuous health bar as in the Microsoft Windows, PlayStation 2 and PlayStation Portable versions, although total loss of health would require a full restart of the current level due to a lack of checkpoints. However, levels that are divided into multiple sections offer a fresh spring in between areas that can fully replenish health and a checkpoint is available at the start of each boss battle. In between levels, players are taken to a campsite where they can purchase health upgrades and consumable supplies for power-ups, examine acquired tools, save progress and more. Some sequences involve using touch screen gestures, such as pulling a lever to extend a bridge, turning a crank to operate an elevator or repeatedly scribbling on the screen to break free of traps. This version has exclusive mini-games that can be played with a friend who has a copy of the game.

== Reception ==
Reception

Aggregate score
Aggregator	Score					
Aggregator	DS	PC	PS2	PS3	Wii	Xbox 360
Metacritic	N/A	N/A	N/A	65/100	62/100	61/100

Review scores
Publication	Score					
Publication	DS	PC	PS2	PS3	Wii	Xbox 360
Famitsu	24/40	N/A	N/A	N/A	27/40	N/A
GameSpot	N/A	N/A	N/A	N/A	5/10	5.5/10
GameZone	N/A	N/A	N/A	N/A	5/10	7.4/10
IGN	N/A	N/A	5.8/10	7/10	7/10	7/10
NGamer	40%	N/A	N/A	N/A	N/A	N/A
Nintendo Power	N/A	N/A	N/A	N/A	6.5/10	N/A
Official Xbox Magazine (UK)	N/A	N/A	N/A	N/A	N/A	6/10
Official Xbox Magazine (US)	N/A	N/A	N/A	N/A	N/A	7/10

The PlayStation 3, Wii, and Xbox 360 versions received "mixed or average" reviews according to the review aggregator Metacritic. In Japan, where the game was published by E Frontier exclusively on Nintendo platforms on December 3, 2009, Famitsu gave it a score of all four sixes for the DS version, and three sevens and one six for the Wii version.
