= Carl Fredricksen =

Protagonist of the 2009 film Up

- Carl as he appears in Up
- First appearance: Up (2009)
- Created by: Pete Docter; Bob Peterson
- Voiced by: Ed Asner (2009–2023); Jeremy Leary (child); Steve Purcell (George & A.J.); Piotr Michael (Disney Speedstorm; 2025-present)

In-universe information
- Species: Human
- Gender: Male
- Occupation: Balloon vendor (formerly)
- Family: Dug (pet golden retriever); Russell (son/grandson figure)
- Spouse: Ellie Fredricksen
- Home: United States
- Nationality: American

Carl Fredricksen is a fictional character and protagonist of the 2009 film Up. He was created by its director Pete Docter and co-director, Bob Peterson, who was inspired by a design of a grumpy old man holding balloons. He was voiced by Ed Asner.

== Concept and creation ==
Carl was created by Pete Docter and Bob Peterson, one of two directors of the film Up. The inspiration for his design, as well as the film, was a drawing of a grumpy old man holding balloons. While Pixar usually designs their characters to be caricatured, Carl was more so caricatured, being only three heads high. He was not given elderly features such as liver spots or hair in his ears to keep him appealing, yet giving him wrinkles, pockmarks on his nose, a hearing aid, and a cane to make him appear elderly. Originally, his intention was to be with his wife, and he floats into the air in the first act. However, the writers did not know where to go with the story after this, so they added the plot of going to South America. The location was chosen due to both director Pete Docter's love of tropical locations, but also in wanting a location that Carl could be stuck with a kid due to the inability to leave him with an authority such as a police officer or social worker. They implemented a child character as a way to help Carl stop being "stuck in his ways". The directors had various rules for Carl's movements: He could not turn his head more than 15–20 degrees without turning his torso as well, nor could he raise his arms very high. However, they also wanted him to grow more flexible near the end of the film, transforming into an "action hero". The directors used various people as inspirations for Carl, including Spencer Tracy, Walter Matthau, James Whitmore, and their own grandparents. Peterson described the love story between Carl and his wife Ellie as the spine of the film. The story was used to define the "adventure" in the film. Docter stated that he related to Carl the best, jokingly stating that he complains about the way things are these days and how current day music is just noise. Two of Docter's favourite scenes were the scene depicting Carl and Ellie aging, stating that it hit home with people, and the scene depicting Carl looking through Ellie's adventure book.

=== Portrayal ===
Carl was portrayed by Ed Asner. Asner describes the love between Carl and Ellie as wonderful, also describing him as a dreamer who is willing to fight for his dreams, which he holds great respect for. When shown a sculpture of Carl by Docter, Asner commented that it looked nothing like him, which Docter found ideal. The dialogue was tailor-made for Asner's speech patterns, looking for words that had more consonants and shortened sentences. They used this to make Carl seem like a hibernating bear who was just awoken.

== Reception ==
Carl has received mostly positive reception for his appearance in Up. Bill Capodagli, author of Innovate the Pixar Way, praised Carl for his ability to be a jerk and likable at the same time. Wall Street Journal editor Joe Morgenstern described Carl as gruff, comparing him to Buster Keaton, but adds that this begins to wear thin as the movie progresses. He has been compared to Spencer Tracy, an influence on the character, by Washington Post editor Ann Hornaday and Empire Online editor Ian Freer, who describes him as similar to a "Guess Who's Coming to Dinner-era" Tracy. Entertainment Weekly editor Lisa Schwarzbaum described his appearance as a cross between Tracy and an eccentric out of a George Booth cartoon. Time editor Richard Corliss also makes the comparison, calling him a "trash compacted version" of Tracy. He has also been compared to Walter Matthau, another inspiration for the character's design, by LA Weekly editor Scott Foundas, suggesting that actor Ed Asner was channeling him while performing the role of Carl. Variety editor Todd McCarthy described Carl as a combination of both Tracy and Matthau.

The relationship between Carl and his wife Ellie has been praised in several media outlets. In his book Disney, Pixar, and the Hidden Message of Children's Films, author M. Keith Booker described the love between Carl and Ellie as touching. While also describing the scene of the two of them aging as a "masterpiece of its own kind", he was not sure how much children would appreciate the scene, commenting that his son was squirming in his seat during the scene. Reelviews editor James Berardinelli praised their relationship, stating that it brought a tear to his eye in a way no animated film has done, including anything by famed anime director Hayao Miyazaki. Ann Hornaday praised the prologue, describing it as "worthy of Chaplin in its heartbreaking poignancy". Chicago Tribune editor Michael Phillips praised the scene, describing it as an emotional and cinematic powerhouse. However, Salon.com editor Stephanie Zacharek criticized the love between Carl and Ellie, describing their marriage as resembling a dental adhesive commercial more than a real relationship.

Edward Asner has been praised in several media outlets for his portrayal of Carl. San Francisco Chronicle editor Mick LaSelle praised Carl's voice actor, Ed Asner, as a great choice due to having a grumpiness to his voice that is not truly grumpy, but rather coming from a protective stance. Entertainment Weekly editor Lisa Schwarzbaum praised Asner's acting, stating that he has a "Lou Grant authority" to his voice. Time editor Richard Corliss stated that Asner had the "gruffness and deadpan comic timing to bring Carl to life". The Boston Globe editor Ty Burr concurred with this, stating that his Lou Grant-like voice had not diminished with time. USA Today editor Claudia Puig praised Asner's delivery, describing it as superb.
