= Burrow (film) =

2020 Pixar short film by Madeline Sharafian

- Official poster
- Directed by: Madeline Sharafian
- Written by: Madeline Sharafian
- Produced by: Michael Capbarat
- Cinematography: Andrew Jimenez
- Edited by: Anna Wolitzky
- Production company: Pixar Animation Studios
- Distributed by: Walt Disney Studios; Motion Pictures
- Release dates: December 25, 2020 (Disney+); January 12, 2024 (with Soul)
- Running time: 6 minutes
- Country: United States
- Language: English

Burrow is a 2020 American animated short film written and directed by Madeline Sharafian, produced by Michael Capbarat at Pixar Animation Studios, and distributed by Walt Disney Studios Motion Pictures. The plot features a young rabbit as she tries to build the burrow of her dreams, becoming embarrassed each time she accidentally digs into a neighbor's home. The eighth short film in the SparkShorts series, the short was released on Disney+ and in theaters with Soul in countries where Disney+ was not available on December 25, 2020. It re-released with Soul in theaters in the United States on January 12, 2024. The short was nominated for the Academy Award for Best Animated Short Film at the 93rd Academy Awards.

== Plot ==
A little brown rabbit is making a burrow in the English countryside. She has drawn a rough, childish sketch of her dream home on a piece of lined paper. When she starts to dig, two of her new neighbors, a mole and a field mouse, both eagerly offer their assistance, showing off the elaborate blueprints and floor plans of burrows they have constructed for their families. Embarrassed at the simplicity and inexperience of her own drawing, the rabbit hides it from them, pretends she has somewhere to be, and starts frantically digging deeper to get away from them, leaving them confused.

During the course of her dig, she keeps bursting in on other underground neighbors by accident, including some frogs who own a library, some hedgehog bakers who offer her muffins, some bathing newts who offer her towels, and some partying beetles and ants who think she is their entertainment for the evening. These incidents further her embarrassment, despite the fact none of the neighbors seem to mind her intrusions. After accidentally waking up a grumpy-sounding animal in a dark cave, she flees down to the bedrock. Finally away from the others, she attempts to widen the hole and form some sort of burrow, only to hit the water table. The released water starts to flood up her hole towards the neighbors' burrows.

In tears, the rabbit flees up to the dark cave and wakes the animal again, to explain her mistake. The scary-sounding animal turns out to be an easy-going, sleepy badger, who roars to summon the other neighbors. Together with the rabbit, they dig a side tunnel to divert the water to the surface, forming a spring and saving their homes. Grateful, the rabbit shows her drawing to the neighbors, who help her improve it logistically but still build a home like what she imagined, even down to the disco ball she drew in the bathroom.

== Production ==
In September 2020, Pixar announced a 2D animated short film titled Burrow would have premiered in theaters before the feature film Soul and would have been the first Pixar short to do so since Bao. The short is directed by Madeline Sharafian and produced by Mike Capbarat. On October 9, 2020, it was announced the short would instead premiere on Disney+.

== Music ==
While no composer has been officially credited, the music in the short was based on that of Wolfgang Amadeus Mozart (including the third movement of his Oboe Concerto & The Magic Flute Overture), who was listed as a Special Thanks.

== Release ==
=== Theatrical and streaming ===
Burrow was released on Disney+ on December 25, 2020. The short was originally scheduled to be released theatrically in front of Soul on November 20, 2020. However, the theatrical release of Soul and Burrow was cancelled in North America and they instead both premiered on Disney+. In other countries where Disney+ was not available, the short was released theatrically alongside Soul as planned. Burrow eventually debuted in theaters in front of Soul on January 12, 2024 in the United States.

=== Reception ===
Liz Kocan, of Decider, gave Burrow a positive review, saying "Stream It! Burrow was set to appear ahead of Soul in theaters, but now that both are debuting directly on Disney+, it's still well worth your six minutes. It's sweet and charming, beautifully animated, and, as many other Pixar shorts are, full of heart", while Tara Bennett, of Syfy Wire, also gave a positive review by saying the short's "warm, illustrative style looks like it's been plucked from the pages of a favorite storybook, much like the Winnie-the-Pooh animated films".

=== Awards ===
Burrow was nominated for a Ursa Major Award in the Best Dramatic Short Work category. The Ursa Major Awards are given in the field of furry fandom works and are the main awards in the field of anthropomorphism. It was nominated for an Academy Award for Best Animated Short, losing to the Netflix short film If Anything Happens I Love You. In 2021, the short was nominated for Best Short Film at the 4th Hollywood Critics Association Film Awards.

== Other appearances ==
- The bunny protagonist from this film appears as an Easter egg in the 2022 Pixar film Turning Red. She can be seen as a sticker on the front of Meilin's notebook. Madeline Sharafian, the director of Burrow, served as a storyboard artist on Turning Red.
- The bunny protagonist from this film also appears as an Easter egg in the 2025 Pixar film Elio. She can be seen as the mascot on a sunscreen bottle. Sharafian served as one of the story writers and lead directors of Elio.
