= Forky Asks a Question =

Series of animated short films by Pixar

- Genre: Animation
- Created by: Bob Peterson
- Developed by: Pete Docter
- Written by: Bob Peterson
- Directed by: Bob Peterson
- Starring: Tony Hale
- Narrated by: Bob Peterson
- Composer: Jake Monaco
- Country of origin: United States
- Original language: English
- No. of seasons: 1
- No. of episodes: 10

Production
- Executive producers: Pete Docter; Jim Morris
- Producer: Mark Nielsen
- Running time: 3–4 mins
- Production company: Pixar Animation Studios

Original release
- Network: Disney+
- Release: November 12, 2019 – January 10, 2020

Forky Asks a Question is an American animated television series of short films produced by Pixar Animation Studios based on the Toy Story franchise, and is set after the events of Toy Story 4. It is the third Pixar short series, following the Cars Toons and Toy Story Toons. The series focuses on the character of Forky (voiced by Tony Hale) as he asks his friends different questions about life.

The short series was announced in June 2019 during Disney+ Investor Day 2019, before the release of Toy Story 4. Bob Peterson created, wrote, directed and narrated the series, and was produced by Mark Nielsen. Jake Monaco provided the score for all ten episodes.

Forky Asks a Question aired from November 12, 2019, to January 10, 2020, on Disney+. The series received positive reviews who praised the humor, animation, and script.

== Premise ==
Set sometime after the events of Toy Story 4, handmade toy Forky asks his friends (the characters of the Toy Story franchise) different questions about life.

== Cast and characters ==
- Tony Hale as Forky, a homemade toy who, having been recently created, asks his friends questions about life.
- John Ratzenberger as Hamm, a piggy bank.
- Wallace Shawn as Rex, a toy tyrannosaurus rex.
- Kristen Schaal as Trixie, a toy triceratops.
- Carol Burnett as Chairol Burnett, a toy chair, whom Bonnie used to play with. Chairol was named after her voice actress Carol Burnett.
- Mel Brooks as Melephant Brooks, a toy elephant, whom Bonnie used to play with. Melephant was named after his voice actor Mel Brooks.
- Carl Reiner as Carl Reineroceros, a toy rhino, whom Bonnie used to play with. This was Reiner's last time reprising this role before his death in June 2020.
- Betty White as Bitey White, a toy tiger teether, whom Bonnie used to play with. This was White's last time reprising this role, as well as her final television role before her death in December 2021.
- Robin Atkin Downes as Mr. Pricklepants, a stuffed hedgehog toy, with a fascination with acting and theater. Downes replaces Timothy Dalton, who voiced the character in previous media of Toy Story.
- Alan Oppenheimer as Old Timer, a toy alarm clock, with the face of an old man.
- Aloma Wright as Rib Tickles, a toy dog Pet Patrol officer. A male version of the character was originally set to appear in Toy Story 4, though it was ultimately deleted.
- Bonnie Hunt as Dolly, one of Bonnie's most beloved toys, and the leader of them.
- Jeff Garlin as Buttercup, a toy unicorn.
- Addison Andrews, Mika Crespo and Imani Prior as Peas in a Pod, a toy version of actual peas in a pod.
- Jeff Pidgeon as Mr. Spell, a toy with a built in keyboard, who speaks words that are typed in. Forky Asks a Question marks Mr. Spell's first appearance since Toy Story 2.

== Episodes ==
All episodes were directed and written by Bob Peterson.

No.	Title	Original release date
1	"What Is Money?"	November 12, 2019
Hamm explains to Forky what money is.
2	"What Is a Friend?"	November 15, 2019
Forky "befriends" a mug, which he thinks is named "What? No!", but he accidentally knocks the mug off a dresser and breaks it.
3	"What Is Art?"	November 22, 2019
Mr. Pricklepants teaches Forky how to act.
4	"What Is Time?"	November 29, 2019
Rex explains the concept of time to Forky, using the age of dinosaurs, as an example.
5	"What Is Love?"	December 6, 2019
Bonnie's old toys explain to Forky the meaning of love.: This episode marked the final acting role for Betty White before her death on New Year's Eve of 2021 and the last performance of Carl Reiner released in his lifetime before his death on June 29, 2020.
6	"What Is a Computer?"	December 13, 2019
Trixie explains to Forky what a computer does, as they experience the common stresses of technology.
7	"What Is a Leader?"	December 20, 2019
Dolly teaches Forky about the qualities of a good leader, and he puts those qualities to the test.
8	"What Is a Pet?"	December 27, 2019
Forky meets Rib Tickles, and is schooled on the dangers of law enforcement.
9	"What Is Cheese?"	January 3, 2020
Buttercup, annoyed with all of Forky’s questions, speed teaches everything there is.
10	"What Is Reading?"	January 10, 2020
The energetic Peas in a Pod siblings teach Forky about reading, with a little help from Mr. Spell.

== Production ==
=== Development ===
On Disney Investor Day 2019, Pixar's chief creative officer, Pete Docter, revealed that a new series of shorts, based on Toy Story 4's Forky, titled Forky Asks a Question, was in development for Disney+, with Tony Hale set to reprise his role from Toy Story 4. Hale said that the series is about "these questions that maybe people are embarrassed maybe to ask, but they really don't know". Bob Peterson wrote and directed the series, and was produced by producer of Toy Story 4, Mark Nielsen.

The series is produced at Pixar Animation Studios.

=== Casting ===
On June 12, 2019, when the series was announced, it was confirmed that Tony Hale would reprise his role from Toy Story 4 in the series. On June 18, Hale revealed during an interview that he already recorded his lines as Forky for the series. A week later, Nielsen revealed that Carol Burnett, Mel Brooks, Carl Reiner and Betty White would reprise their roles from Toy Story 4, as Chairol Burnett, Melephant Brooks, Carl Reineroceros, and Bitey White, respectively, during the series. Nielsen said the characters have "considerable screen time" compared to their appearances in the film.

During the D23 Expo on August 23, 2019, it was revealed that John Ratzenberger would reprise his role as Hamm in the series. On October 30, 2019, Wallace Shawn and Kristen Schaal were revealed to be reprising their roles as Rex and Trixie, respectively.

=== Music ===
Jake Monaco composed the series' score. Monaco said that "Forky's character is so animated ... There are so many movements and facial expressions and the voice acting that Tony Hale does is just incredible. He is enough to carry any scene by himself". He also said that Peterson "wanted the music to simply disappear into the background", to which he gave the score "a little bit of a jazz vibe".

A soundtrack for the series' first season, featuring Monaco's score, and two tracks written by Monaco and Toby Sherriff, was released on February 28, 2020.

== Release ==
Forky Asks a Question was released on November 12, 2019, on Disney+. The series consists of ten episodes released weekly, with each episode being 3 to 4 minutes long. A clip from the series was shown at the D23 August 2019. The series' first trailer was released on October 30, 2019.

== Reception ==
=== Critical response ===
On Rotten Tomatoes, the series holds an approval rating of 83%, based on twelve reviews, with an average rating of 7.95/10. Its critical consensus reads, “Short and sweet, Forky Asks a Question is fun and funny enough to work for fans.” On Metacritic, the series has a weighted average score of 64 out of 100, based on five critics, indicating “generally favourable reviews.”

Joel Keller of Decider praised the humor of the series, acclaimed the quality of the animation, and found that the script manages to be entertaining for both adults and kids. David Griffin of IGN rated the first episode of the series 9 out of 10, found the show to be very amusing and educational, stated that the animation reaches the level of Pixar's theatrical movies, and praised the performance of Tony Hale as Forky. Emily Ashby of Common Sense Media rated the show 4 out of 5 stars, stating: "Forky Asks a Question centers on the breakout star character of Toy Story 4 as he ponders the big questions about the world and how it works. Each of the 10 short episodes sees one of his toy friends helping Forky learn things like what it means to be a friend, what defines art, and what time is. Forky absorbs information at a preschooler's pace, which means his focus changes a lot and he gets distracted at times, but he always manages to sum up the main point succinctly and thoughtfully. This hilarious extension of a beloved character is a must-see for Forky fans of all ages".

=== Accolades ===
Year	Award	Category	Nominee(s)	Result	Ref.
2020	Primetime Emmy Awards	Outstanding Short Form Animated Program	Bob Peterson, Mark Nielsen (for "What Is Love?")	Won	
