= Bao (film) =

2018 American short film by Domee Shi

- Film poster
- Directed by: Domee Shi
- Written by: Domee Shi
- Produced by: Becky Neiman-Cobb
- Cinematography: Patrick Lin (camera); Ian Megibben (lighting)
- Edited by: Katherine Ringgold
- Music by: Toby Chu
- Production company: Pixar Animation Studios
- Distributed by: Walt Disney Studios; Motion Pictures (Note: Distributed under the Walt Disney Pictures banner.)
- Release dates: April 21, 2018 (Tribeca Film Festival); June 15, 2018 (with Incredibles 2)
- Running time: 8 minutes
- Country: United States

Bao is a 2018 American animated short film written and directed by Domee Shi and produced by Pixar Animation Studios. It is the first Pixar short film to be directed by a female director. It was screened at the Tribeca Film Festival before being released with Incredibles 2 on June 15, 2018. The film is about an aging and lonely Chinese Canadian mother suffering from empty nest syndrome, who receives an unexpected second chance at motherhood when she makes a steamed bun (baozi) that comes to life. The film won the Academy Award for Best Animated Short Film at the 91st Academy Awards.

== Plot ==
In Toronto, a Chinese-Canadian woman cooks a meal of baozi for her and her husband. One of her buns comes alive, much to her shock. She raises the steamed bun as a child, feeding and caring for it, as it enjoys the time spent with her. Eventually, the bun wishes to play with other children, but his overprotective mother refuses to allow it, much to his ire. As the bun grows, he desires increasing amounts of independence, which creates tension between the two of them that gradually alienates them from each other. When the bun introduces the mother to his new fiancée, with whom he will leave home, the mother protests. She tries to stop the steamed bun from leaving, and in a fit of desperation, she eats the bun, after which she cries over what she has done.

Later, as the mother lies in bed, her real son enters the room, revealing that the whole sequence was an allegorical dream. His father urges him to talk to his mother, but she rebuffs her son's attempts to do so. As he and his mother sit on the edge of her bed, he offers her the same treat he once refused on the bus, which they share in an emotional moment. Later, after reconciling, the son and his fiancée join his mother in making buns, as his father looks on with approval.

== Production ==
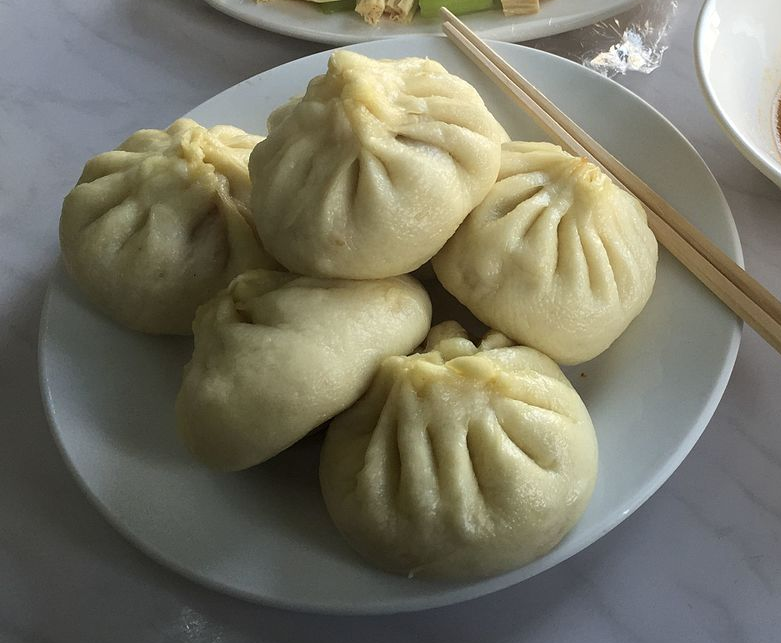
A plate of baozi

Bao was directed by Domee Shi and produced by Becky Neiman-Cobb. Bao was the first of 35 Pixar shorts to be directed by a woman, made more significant as well as the fact that the animation industry is male-dominated as a whole. Shi first began working on Bao as a storywriter on the film Inside Out, and says she wanted to work creatively on a project on her own. The earliest sketches of Bao date back to January 2014, when Shi began work on it as a side project, drawing inspiration from classic fairy tales and her experience as an only child. It began as a brainstorm of different steamed bun ideas and characters with Shi recalling, "This image popped into my head of this mom nuzzling her little baby steamed bun to death, and I had to draw it down." Having been an only child while growing up in Toronto, she identified herself with the metaphor of the "overprotected little steamed bun." Shi worked on Bao alone for two years before bringing in a crew.

When asked why the film has no dialogue, Shi explained that she wanted it to be understood universally by audiences, without any language barrier. She also said that she wanted to challenge herself to tell the story visually, given the visual nature of animation as a medium, and rely solely on elements such as acting, set design, color and lighting to evoke emotions. The only recorded dialogue in the short film is a scene in which the Father is watching television. The Mandarin dialogue in the details of that scene is an homage to old Cantonese soap operas that Shi watched with her mother growing up.

The Mother character eating the steamed bun was one of the first choices made when creating the film. She wants to keep the steamed bun character to herself so bad that she eats it, though she regrets it immediately. This was itself based on something Shi's mother would say: "Oh I wish I could put you back in my stomach so I knew exactly where you were at all times." Shi herself had frustrations while growing up about being coddled so she talked to her mom as well as other parents to see the other perspective. Shi very much uses the short to step outside of her own point of view in order to identify with the mother who is the main character. It was told with the theme of primal love, as Shi explains, "the type of love you would destroy so it would not disappear and go away."

A driving motivation for Shi's desire to tell the story in Bao was her experiences of being Asian in a country with lack of Asian-American media. Her influences include those derived from having grown up watching Asian films and animation, including those of Studio Ghibli. Initially Shi was worried that the ending was too dark, and would be out of place for a Pixar film, which prompted her to write a watered down version. However, when she pitched it to her mentor, Pete Docter, who became an executive producer on Bao, he encouraged Shi to pitch the darker version, and stay true to her original idea and preferred style, saying, "Don't be afraid to push it, be as culturally specific as you want it to be."

Although Shi did go with the darker ending that she had anticipated, there were multiple different drafts of the way that the ending would be properly executed. She wanted to portray this idea of the mother eating her steamed bun child, but in a way that was both viscerally appropriate for children and with a clear motive. Shi stated that earlier drafts of the scene contained more disturbing images. One draft in particular showed the Mother actually chewing on the steamed bun for a couple of moments while crying before swallowing her son. Shi explained how she would show this particular version to others and "they would be really, really upset by it." Shi took this feedback and created the final produced version that made it into the short in which the Mother takes the dumpling and swallows the son in one gulp without chewing, in order to show "a quick crime of passion."

Shi went on to say that Bao was an example of a children's story that involved darker elements and themes that she believed were important, and a modern-day interpretation of some of the darker-themed folk tales that inspired her, such as The Gingerbread Man and Asian fables about finding babies in food such as peaches. She wanted to experiment with these ideas since she "always loved how they play with light and dark elements. These little characters are so cute, but the world wants to eat them." Shi believes that society should embrace children's films with darker elements like Something Wicked This Way Comes and The Dark Crystal because they can be as educational as lighter-themed films. Shi believes that children's films need to introduce more of these themes and show them as equally as these lighter elements of storytelling. She wants children to be able to understand how common dark elements are in day-to-day life and equip them with the tools they need for the real world.

Although Bao was approved for production in 2015, Shi knew it would be a long and uncertain journey, equating short films to an indie wing of Pixar, which would have to borrow people who are free for a couple weeks at a time in between feature films. Bao thus had to be worked on more slowly, creatively and flexibly, with the production only finding out that it would be paired with Incredibles 2 a year before that film's release. Shi found the pairing thematically appropriate, as both films, in her view, celebrated mothers. Fitting her story into the eight-minute running time forced Shi to be economical with the shots of food.

Shi viewed the film as an example of stories Pixar had come to embrace featuring greater diversity and cultural perspectives, a road that had been paved by previous Pixar films including the Pixar short, Sanjay's Super Team and the 2017 feature film Coco.

=== Animation ===
In order to research the cuisine presented in the short (many of which were inspired by favorite dishes that Shi's parents made), the crew took many steamed bun and Sichuan restaurant trips in San Francisco and Oakland's Chinatown. Shi's mother even acted as a consultant, as she was a creative immigrant woman who made her own recipes and steamed bun shapes. She came in twice to Pixar to hold steamed bun-making classes for the crew, which also provided video reference for kneading dough and making wrappers for the opening shots of the film.

While the final product looked appetizing, animating the food proved particularly challenging for the FX artists involved. The food is organic and squishy, which made it difficult to render. The kneading and wrapping were some of the most expensive and complicated shots of the film, and the steamed bun shot with pork filling took an entire two months to complete, as getting raw pork to look appetizing was difficult.

Animating the food involved similar principles to food photography: exaggerating and emphasizing things that are not there. Colors had to be saturated and bigger chunks of carrots and onions had to be added. It was difficult to get the physics and consistency of fillings right, as making it too watery ran the risk of it resembling paste or hummus. Another complicated shot involved the folding of the steamed bun itself, as the filling has to collide with the wrapper in a realistic way as the Mother's fingers pinch the wrapper closed.

Shi described the animation as exhibiting a very organic overarching style. The animators were given cartoon-like Japanese animations as reference, with extremely pushed expressions. The steamed bun character is made out of dough, so the animation was made to highlight his squishy and organic qualities. This can be seen in his extremely flexible mouth, which opens both very big and goes very small. His limbs stretch out and he is bouncy. "Squishy and round and simple" was a principle that applied to the film as a whole, including the humans, the world and the set design. Everything was set thick and very low to the ground, while the produce in Chinatown was oversized. No edges in the film are completely straight. She explained, "We wanted there to be this perfect imperfection in the world to feel more handmade and personal and warm."

Shi explained how she worked with a good number of female supervisors on her team for Bao. In particular, production designer, Rona Liu, who is Chinese American, helped ensure that the film's designs exhibited authenticity in their depiction of Chinese culture, drawing on her own personal life, much as Shi did. Photos of their parents' houses, as well as research trips taken by the entire staff to shops and dim sum restaurants, including those in San Francisco's Chinatown and Oakland, provided reference for the film's production design.

Shi made Toronto the setting for Bao to pay homage to her hometown, and to facilitate a sense of realism. To further capture this authenticity, Liu helped keep track of cultural details, such as tin foil covering the burners on the stove, tchotchkes on the television, the rice cooker in the background, and soy sauce bottles. Some details, such as the toilet paper on the kitchen table, faced some confusion from non-Asian crew members. This is a common practice amongst immigrants because it is more practical than buying two kinds of paper, and Shi ensured that this was included. Other members of the production crew were also instructed to visit specific locations in Chinatown to shop and eat at in order to given the film a sense of authenticity.

== Release ==
The film premiered at the Tribeca Film Festival on April 21, 2018, and subsequently accompanied Incredibles 2 in theaters. Prior to the Christmas holiday in 2018, Pixar made Bao freely available to stream on YouTube for a week, the first time that the studio has offered a short in this manner.

== Reception ==
=== Critical response ===
Bao has an approval rating of 88% on the review aggregator website Rotten Tomatoes, based on eight reviews, with an average rating of 8.4/10.

In The Verge's review of Incredibles 2, Tasha Robinson described Bao as an "extremely emotional little film" and a "perfect complement" to the main feature. Inkoo Kang of Slate called the film a "moving encapsulation of the Asian-immigrant experience". Jess Lee for Digital Spy said that the film "hit extremely close to home", and added that the story exhibits "universal themes which should resonate with most cultures".

Petrana Radulovic of Polygon says the film was well received by "many" Asian Americans, although some non-Asian viewers found the short confusing.

Lisa Wong Macabasco of Vogue saw Bao as a story whose emotional resonance is derived from how it fuses its themes of food and family. Considering the empty nest syndrome presented by the mother character, Shi had to relate her own experiences as a daughter of Chinese immigrants. In making the Mother the main character, Shi places herself in her own mother's shoes to show her emotional journey as she dedicates her life to raising a child, and for whom the idea of a primal love prompts her to destroy something to prevent it from escaping her. Macabasco also thought the film was culturally significant for being an example of how Pixar came to embrace stories from diverse cultural backgrounds.

=== Accolades ===
At the 91st Academy Awards, Bao won Best Animated Short Film.
