= Matías Pérez (balloonist) =

Portuguese-born Cuban balloonist

- Born: Unknown; Portugal
- Disappeared: 28 June 1856; Campo de Marte, Havana, Captaincy General of Cuba
- Occupation: Balloonist

Matías Pérez (disappeared 28 June 1856) was a Portuguese-born Cuban resident who started a canopy business in Havana in the 19th century. He was fascinated with the ever-increasing popularity of hot-air balloons and became a balloon pilot, ascending at least three times before he disappeared while attempting a balloon ascent from Havana's Campo de Marte on 28 June 1856.

A few days earlier Pérez had made a successful attempt at ascending in a balloon, flying several miles. His second try, however, became part of Cuba's folklore: when somebody or something disappears into thin air, Cubans say: "Voló como Matías Pérez" (flew away like Matías Pérez).

== Early career ==
Matías Pérez, originally a Portuguese citizen, moved to Cuba and started a successful business selling canopies and awnings. He was known as the "king of the canopies" at the time. But it is said that Pérez always had an interest in aeronautics. Before buying a balloon from the French pilot Eugène Godard, with whom he had a friendly relationship, the two men had taken flight together from Havana on 21 May 1856.

== Interest in aeronautics and famous flights ==
Pérez was not the first aeronautic pilot on Cuban soil. Before him were Frenchman Eugenio Robertson, who took flight on 19 March 1828, French-born Adolfo Theodore, who made three ascents in 1830, and Cuban Domingo Blineau (credited as the first Cuban to build a balloon from scratch and personally produce hydrogen gas for fuel).

The list goes on, and includes the famous French pilot Eugène Godard, who flew his balloon Ville de París (City of Paris) many times in the island, before selling it to Matías Pérez for 1,200 hard pesos. Godard was a reputed balloon pilot and builder. He built his first prototype in 1845, and launched several models within the following year. Godard had constructed a balloon called Ville de París in 1850, in which he gained notoriety on 6 October by flying from Paris to Gits. The aircraft Matías Pérez would buy in 1856 was also called Ville de París. Whether this was the same balloon is disputed since there exists an eyewitness report that the original was destroyed by fire in Marseille just a month after its famous flight.

Once Pérez procured the ship, he sought permission to fly it in a letter to Captain General José Gutiérrez de la Concha. The first flight took place on 12 June 1856 with excellent atmospheric conditions.

The second flight took place on 28 July 1856. Local newspapers reported that the wind was strong the day the flight was scheduled, causing Pérez to delay his ascent. He finally decided to ascend at sunset around 7:00 p.m. and was never seen again. His disappearance earned him a place in Cuban history and popular culture.

== In popular culture ==
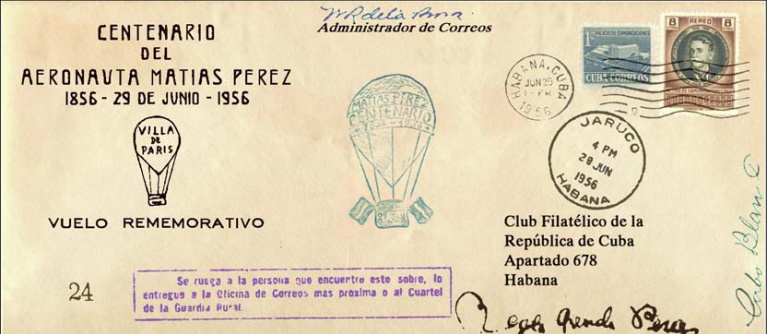
First Day envelope dedicated to Matías Pérez

His disappearance coined the popular century-old phrase "Voló como Matías Pérez" (Flew like Matías Pérez) used in occasions when a person refers to a missing person or object.

Coprefil, the Cuban official agency responsible for design, production and sales of stamps, celebrated Matías Pérez 100th anniversary flight with a First Day Edition, on 29 June 1956, and honored him again as one of Cuba's first pilots with a 3-cent and a 13-cent postage stamp, showing Plaza de Marte, from where he departed, and the Chorrera Fort, where he landed after his first successful trip in 1856.

In 1969, the story of Matías Pérez was translated into a recurring comic series by artist Luis Lorenzo Sosa. This science fiction adventure claims the pilot was abducted by an alien race and taken to the far-away planet of Strakon. It was released by Abril Publishing House on a weekly basis, in the Pionero Magazine.

== See also ==
- Cluster ballooning
- List of missing aircraft
- List of people who disappeared mysteriously at sea
- Other intrepid balloonists:
  - Adelir Antônio de Carli (a.k.a. Padre Baloneiro), Brazilian priest, human-rights defender, lost in the Atlantic Ocean in Brazilian offshore water during his second cluster balloon attempt on 20 April 2008.
  - Bartolomeu de Gusmão, a priest and naturalist born in the Portuguese colony of Brazil, recalled for his first balloon flight in Lisbon in 1720 (the balloon burned).
  - Danny Deckchair, a 2004 Australian comedy film inspired by the story of the Lawnchair Larry flight.
  - Larry Walters, an American truck driver who took flight in California on 2 July 1982 in a homemade aircraft consisting of an ordinary patio chair with 45 helium-filled weather balloons attached to it.
  - Thomas Leigh Gatch Jr., an American balloonist who disappeared while attempting to cross the Atlantic in a self-made balloon in 1974 and was never found.
