= Adelir Antônio de Carli =

Brazilian priest and balloonist (1967–2008)

- Carli being interviewed by a TV station shortly before his last flight
- Born: 8 February 1967; Pelotas, Rio Grande do Sul or Ampére, Paraná, Brazil
- Disappeared: 20 April 2008; Brazilian territorial waters, Atlantic Ocean
- Died: 2008 (aged 41); Brazilian territorial waters, Atlantic Ocean
- Resting place: Ampére, Paraná, Brazil
- Occupation: Catholic priest
- Known for: Human rights activism, cluster ballooning

Adelir Antônio de Carli (8 February 1967 – between 20 April 2008 and 4 July 2008), also known as Padre Baloeiro or Padre do Balão (Brazilian Portuguese for 'Balloon Priest'), was a Brazilian Catholic priest who died after a cluster-ballooning attempt on 20 April 2008. Carli undertook the exercise to raise money to fund a spiritual rest area for truck drivers in the port city of Paranaguá.

== Biography ==
Adelir Antônio de Carli was born on 8 February 1967. (Note: Sources differ over whether he was born in Pelotas, Rio Grande do Sul, or Ampére, Paraná.) He was the third child of Salete Gundalin and Aurélio de Carli, and had three siblings. His parents divorced when he was four years old. He lived with his mother in Paraguay until her death due to a throat tumor when he was fifteen years old, after which he returned to Brazil to live with his father. Carli worked as a tire repairman with him and later as a gas station attendant at his uncle's gas station, while also painting tablecloths as a side job. He was described as a quiet and humble person, and was an excellent student. Carli unexpectedly joined a seminary in Paranaguá, being ordained in August 2003. He worked in Ampére before being appointed as the head of the Paróquia de São Cristóvão – a parish in Paranaguá – in 2004.

At Paranaguá, Carli created the Pastoral Rodoviária, a rest area for truckers. Fuelled by a "necessity to spread God's message", he conceived the project with the intent of assisting and evangelizing the truck drivers who would pass by the port. Carli held masses in the port patio and try to bring comfort to the drivers. He also fought to protect the human rights of the city residents, often clashing with city officials, earning Carli a reputation as a troublemaker. For example, in 2006, Carli denounced human rights violations against homeless people in Paranaguá. The Municipal Guard agents of the city would forcibly take homeless people from the streets, usually at night, and dump them in neighboring towns. These denunciations led to the arrest of seven Municipal Guard agents and the municipal security secretary. That same year, Carli successfully prevented the forced removal of several small diners from the port patio by staging a protest against the port managers.

To bring more visibility and funding to the Pastoral, Carli decided to attempt to break the 19-hour flight record for cluster ballooning. Six months before the flight, he had enrolled in a paragliding course in Curitiba. Carli refused to attend the theory classes, and after two incidents where he disobeyed his instructor, he was expelled from the school. His first attempt was on 13 January 2008, during which he successfully completed a four-hour flight from Ampére, Paraná, Brazil, to San Antonio, Misiones, Argentina, over a total distance of 25 kilometres (16 mi). Using 600 balloons, he reportedly reached heights of 5,300 metres (17,400 ft).

== Cluster ballooning attempt ==
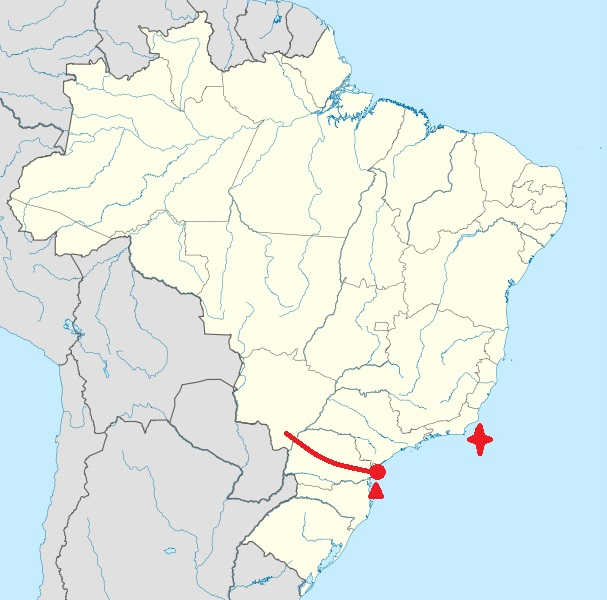
Trajectory of Carli's cluster balloon flight. Red dot: departure. Red line: expected course. Red triangle: last radio contact. Red cross: body found.

In preparation for the flight, Carli took jungle-survival and mountain-climbing courses. On 20 April 2008, shortly before his flight, Carli celebrated Mass, attended by some churchgoers, onlookers and the media. Despite overcast weather and rain, he took off from Paranaguá at 13:00 (UTC−3) in a chair attached to 1,000 balloons. He planned to land at Dourados in Mato Grosso do Sul, where his brother Marcos lived, 20 hours later. Carli reached an altitude of 5,800 metres (19,000 ft), almost twice as high as he expected. Carli's flight equipment included a parachute, helmet, waterproof coveralls, GPS device, mobile phone, satellite phone, flotation device chair, aluminum thermal flight suit, and at least five days of food and drinking water.

Eu preciso entrar em contato com o pessoal para que eles me ensinem a operar esse GPS aqui para dar as coordenadas de latitude e longitude que é a única forma que alguém por terra possa saber onde eu estou. O celular via satélite fica saindo de área e além do mais a bateria está enfraquecendo.

I need to get in touch with the staff so they can teach me how to operate this GPS here to give the latitude and longitude coordinates, which is the only way anyone on the ground can know where I am. The satellite cell phone keeps going out of range and furthermore the battery is getting low.

— Carli, 20 minutes after taking off, RPC TV report.

Carli's last contact with the Paranaguá port authority occurred at 20:45, after he had flown around 90 kilometres (56 mi) and was about 30 miles (48 km) off the coast. He made a call from his cell phone to pass his location to the Brazilian Navy. After his last contact, the Navy, the Brazilian Air Force and firefighters started searching the Santa Catarina coast, with the help of a small plane rented by Carli's family. The Air Force called off the search by 24 April. Two days after the flight, a Penha fire department commander familiar with the situation put Carli's chances of still being alive at 80 per cent. The Brazilian Navy called off the ocean search on 29 April, saying the chances of finding Carli alive in the ocean were "very remote". Pieces of balloon were later reported floating in the sea off the coast.

On 4 July, the lower half of a human body was found floating on the ocean surface by an offshore oil rig support vessel about 100 km (62 mi) from Macaé. The remains were initially identified as Carli's from the clothing, later confirmed by DNA tests on 29 July after comparison with samples provided by Carli's brother. Carli's remains were taken to Paranaguá, and were received with a round of applause from churchgoers. A mass was held in his honor, and he was later buried in a special chapel in Ampére.

== See also ==
- Bartolomeu de Gusmão
- Danny Deckchair
- Lawnchair Larry flight
- List of people who disappeared mysteriously at sea
- List of unusual deaths in the 21st century
- Matías Pérez (balloonist)
