= Lawnchair Larry flight =

Homemade aerostat using weather balloons

Coordinates: 33.7380°N 118.3130°W

External image
- Undated photo of Larry's lawnchair.

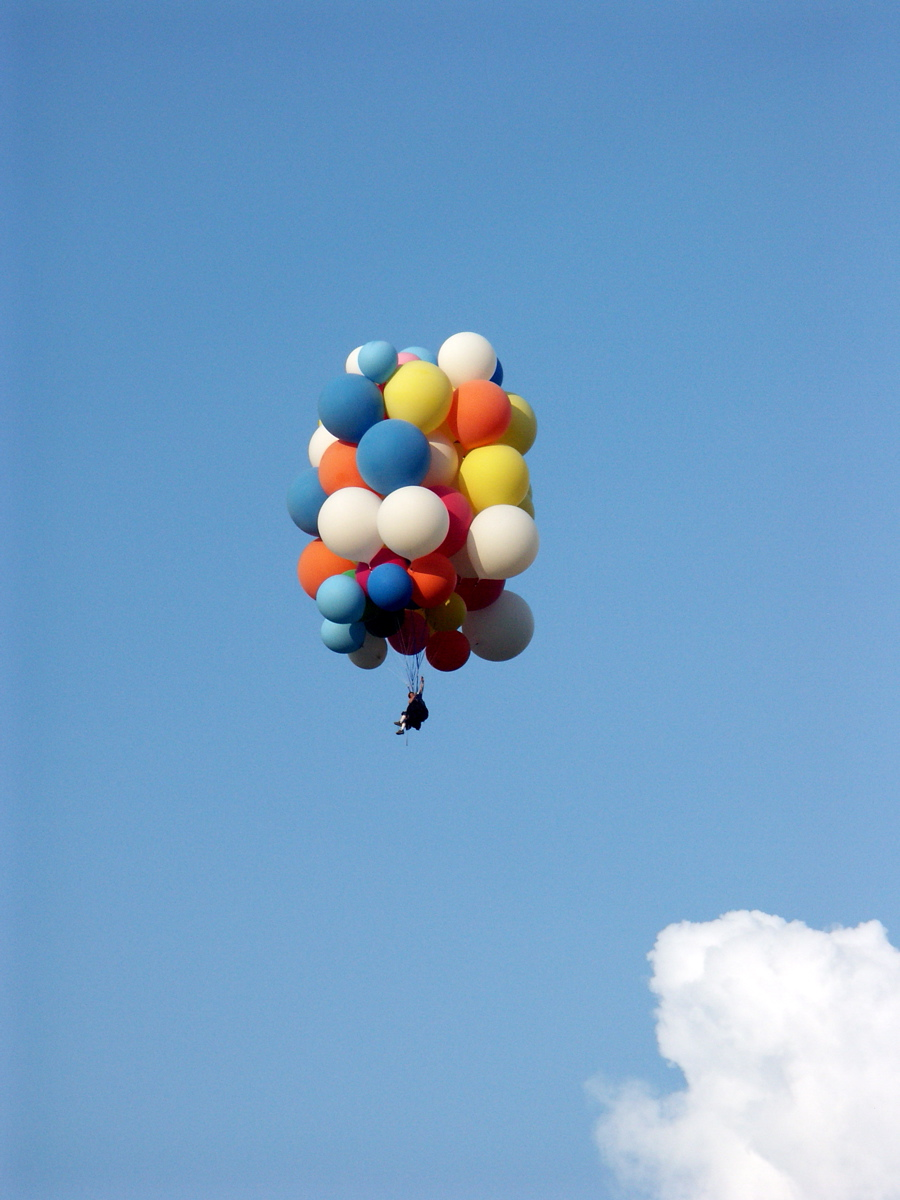
Cluster ballooning was inspired by Larry Walters's experience, although his was not the first.

On July 2, 1982, Larry Walters (April 19, 1949 – October 6, 1993) made a 45-minute flight in a homemade aerostat made of an ordinary lawn chair and 42 helium-filled weather balloons. The aircraft rose to an altitude of about 16,000 feet (4,900 m), drifted from the point of liftoff in the San Pedro neighborhood of Los Angeles, California, and entered controlled airspace near Long Beach Airport. During the final descent, the aircraft became entangled in power lines, but Walters was able to climb down safely. The flight attracted worldwide media attention and inspired a movie (Danny Deckchair), a musical, and numerous imitators.

== Background ==
Walters's high school yearbook photo, 1966

Lawrence Richard "Larry" Walters was born in Los Angeles, and attended Hollywood High School. He had often dreamed of flying, but was unable to become a pilot because of his poor eyesight. He served as a cook in the Vietnam War, and eventually became a truck driver after he was discharged. He first thought of using weather balloons to fly at age 13, after seeing them hanging from the ceiling of a military surplus store.

== Preparation and flight ==
In mid-1982, he decided to try his flying idea. He intended to float over the Mojave Desert and then use a pellet gun to burst some of the balloons in order to descend safely. Walters and his girlfriend, Carol Van Deusen, purchased 45 eight-foot (2.4 m) weather balloons from a military surplus store.

On July 2, 1982, Walters attached 42 of the balloons (although he sometimes quoted 43 in interviews) to his lawn chair, filled them with helium, put on a parachute, and strapped himself into the chair in the backyard of a home at 1633 West 7th Street in San Pedro owned by Carol's mother. He took his pellet gun, a Citizens band radio, sandwiches, 2 liters of Coca-Cola, a pack of beer, and a camera. When the cord that tied his lawn chair to his Jeep broke prematurely, before the end of a planned delay for notifying the authorities, Walters's lawn chair rose rapidly to a height of about 16,000 feet (4,900 m) and was spotted from two commercial airliners. At this altitude, far greater than he had intended, Walters experienced freezing temperatures and lower oxygen levels.

He was in contact with the Radio Emergency Associated Communication Teams (REACT), a citizens band radio monitoring organization, which recorded their conversation:

REACT: What information do you wish me to tell [the airport] at this time as to your location and your difficulty?
Larry: Ah, the difficulty is, ah, this was an unauthorized balloon launch, and, uh, I know I'm in a federal airspace, and, uh, I'm sure my ground crew has alerted the proper authority. But, uh, just call them and tell them I'm okay.

After 45 minutes in the sky, Walters shot several balloons with a pellet gun, taking care not to unbalance the load. He then accidentally dropped his pellet gun overboard. Despite having taken a camera, he did not take any photos. He descended slowly, until the balloons' dangling cables became caught in a power line at 423 E 44th Way in Long Beach. The power line broke, causing a 20-minute electricity blackout. He landed unharmed.

== Aftermath ==
Walters was immediately arrested by waiting members of the Long Beach Police Department. Regional safety inspector Neal Savoy was reported to have said, "We know he broke some part of the Federal Aviation Act, and as soon as we decide which part it is, some type of charge will be filed. If he had a pilot's license, we'd suspend that, but he doesn't." Walters initially was fined $4,000 ($13,345 in 2025) for violations under U.S. Federal Aviation Regulations, including operating an aircraft within an airport traffic area "without establishing and maintaining two-way communications with the control tower". Walters appealed, and the fine was reduced to $1,500 ($5,004 in 2025). A charge of operating a "civil aircraft for which there is not currently in effect an airworthiness certificate" was dropped, as it was not applicable to his class of aircraft.

Just after landing, Walters spoke to the press, saying: "It was something I had to do. I had this dream for twenty years, and if I hadn't done it, I think I would have ended up in the funny farm." "Since I was 13 years old, I've dreamed of going up into the clear blue sky in a weather balloon […] By the grace of God, I fulfilled my dream. But I wouldn't do this again for anything." He has also been credited as explaining his flight by saying, "A man can't just sit around."

The aircraft was dubbed Inspiration I. Lawn Chair Larry was awarded the title of "At-Risk Survivor" in the 1993 Darwin Awards.

Ten days after his flight, Walters appeared on Late Night with David Letterman. He was briefly in demand as a motivational speaker, and quit his job as a truck driver. He was featured in a Timex print ad in the early 1990s, but never made much money from his fame.

The lawn chair used in the flight was reportedly given to an admiring boy named Jerry Fleck, though Walters regretted doing so when the Smithsonian Institution asked him to donate it to its museum. Twenty years later, Fleck sent an email to Mark Barry, a pilot who had documented Walters's story and dedicated a website to it. Fleck still had the chair, attached to some of the original tethers and water jugs used as ballast. The chair was placed on loan to the San Diego Air and Space Museum, where it was exhibited in 2014. It was later donated to the Smithsonian. After being displayed at the Steven F. Udvar-Hazy Center in Virginia, the lawn chair is now on display at the National Air and Space Museum in Washington, DC.

=== Later life and death ===
Later in his life, Walters hiked the San Gabriel Mountains and did volunteer work for the United States Forest Service. He later broke up with his girlfriend of 15 years and could only find work sporadically as a security guard. On October 6, 1993, at the age of 44, Walters died by suicide after shooting himself in the heart in Angeles National Forest.

== Other cluster ballooning events ==
In 1937, Al Mingalone, an American photographer for Paramount News, used 32 weather balloons for a feature photography assignment at Old Orchard Beach in Maine. While he hung suspended from the balloons by a parachute harness in order to take aerial film footage, Mingalone's mooring rope broke and he was lifted approximately 700 feet (210 m) into the air. A clergyman, Father James J. Mullen, spotted the incident, and after a chase of some 13 miles (21 km), used a .22-caliber rifle to shoot out two of the balloons, thus allowing the photographer to return safely to the ground.

Walters's flight spawned imitators and allegedly inspired the extreme sport of cluster ballooning.

- On New Year's Day, 1984, in Stow, Massachusetts, Kevin Walsh made a flight to 9,000 feet (2,700 m) with 57 helium balloons and descended by parachute. He was cited with four violations of FAA regulations and fined $4,000 ($12,396 in 2025).
- On July 7, 2007, Kent Couch, a 47-year-old American gas station owner from Bend, Oregon, reportedly flew 240 miles (390 km) in his lawn chair, landing in a field about 3 1/2 miles (6 km) NNW of North Powder, Oregon, about 30 miles (50 km) from the Idaho border. Traveling an average of 22 mph (35 km/h), Couch used plastic bags filled with 75 litres (20 US gal) of water as ballast against the 105 large helium balloons tied to his lawn chair. Like Walters, Couch had a BB gun on hand to shoot the balloons in order to initiate descent. After the flight, he developed a way to release helium from the balloons, allowing for a more controlled descent. During a second flight on July 5, 2008, Couch realized his goal of interstate travel when he landed safely in western Idaho. The trip totaled 240 miles (390 km) and took 9 hours and 12 minutes.
- On January 13, 2008, the Brazilian Roman Catholic priest and human-rights defender Adelir Antônio de Carli lifted off from Ampére, Brazil, suspended under 600 helium-filled party balloons, and reached an altitude of 5,300 metres (17,400 ft) before landing safely in Argentina. On April 20, 2008, lifting off from Paranaguá, Brazil, in an attempt to fly 725 km (450 mi) inland to Dourados, Brazil, he flew using a chair suspended under 1,000 party balloons, reaching an altitude of 6,100 metres (20,000 ft). Not having checked the weather forecast, he got caught in a storm. He had a GPS but did not know how to operate it. He was last heard on the radio eight hours after liftoff approaching the water after flying off the coast, unable to give his position, and crashed in the Atlantic Ocean; the lower half of his body was found by the Brazilian Navy near an offshore oil platform on July 4, 2008.
- On May 28, 2010, the American adventurer Jonathan Trappe crossed the English Channel by cluster balloon, departing near Challock, England, and crossing over the White Cliffs of Dover at St. Margarets Bay. He made landfall again over Dunkirk, France, and then tracked inland, landing in a farmer's cabbage patch in France. Trappe continued to experiment in cluster ballooning flights. In 2011, he replicated the floating house from the animated film Up for a National Geographic television program.
- On July 6, 2015, Daniel Boria of Calgary, Alberta, Canada, tied about 100 helium balloons to a garden chair and flew over his city in a publicity stunt. He escaped his balloon pod by cutting himself loose and deploying his parachute.
- On October 20, 2017, Tom Morgan of Bristol, England, reached heights of 8,000 ft (2,438 m) using 100 color helium balloons and flew 25 km (15.5 miles) over South Africa.
- On September 2, 2020, David Blaine reached 24,900 feet (7,600 m) via helium-filled balloons, suspended by harness attached to a cable routed through his sleeve to appear as if holding the balloons by one hand. He had all necessary licenses and permissions, carried an oxygen supply, ADS-B transponder, and remote control of ballast and balloon-popping squibs. He released himself from the balloons and free-fell until his parachute automatically opened at 7,000 feet (2,100 m). The balloon was then remotely piloted by the ground team to a safe landing.

== In popular culture ==
- The song "Walters" by the American band Pinback from their 2007 album Autumn of the Seraphs is about the event and Walters's life after it.
- A comedy musical based on the events, 42 Balloons, debuted at The Lowry in Salford, UK in April 2024. It had its North American premiere in Chicago on June 10, 2025 at Chicago Shakespeare Theater.
- 2003 Australian comedy film Danny Deckchair was inspired by Walters’s story. A documentary called Larry’s Lawnchair is in production as of 2024 by filmmaker Nirvan Mullick, using long-lost footage from Walters’ flight.
- The 2003 episode of King of the Hill, "The Miseducation of Bobby Hill", features a subplot in which Bill Dauterive attempts to fly on a lawnchair with weather balloons attached to it, only to be swept away and become lost for several days.
- The 2003 episode of Malcolm in the Middle, "Day Care", features a subplot where Reese is inspired to join the heavens by flying on a lawnchair and balloons, only to later crash through the church window.
- The song ’Up’ by Australian band the Lucksmiths retells the story in a very condensed and catchy way.

== See also ==
- Balloon boy hoax
- Jetpack man, alleged unauthorized aerial vehicle and possible balloon in 2020s California
- Up (2009 film)
- Wan Hu
