= Kent Couch =

American cluster balloonist

Kent Couch is an American cluster balloonist who drew international interest for his flights across the state of Oregon.

== Cluster balloon flights ==
Couch, a 47-year-old gas station owner, first flew 193 miles (311 km) in July 2007 riding a lawnchair elevated by 105 large helium balloons. Using amateur instruments to measure altitude and speed, a GPS device to track his location, and 5 gallons (19 litres) of water for ballast, he controlled his descent by releasing water. The flight began in Bend, Oregon and ended in Union, short of Couch's goal of reaching Idaho.

Couch began another flight at dawn on Saturday, July 5, 2008. That afternoon he successfully crossed the desert border, landing near Cambridge, Idaho.

== See also ==
- Cluster ballooning
- Larry Walters
