= Jetpack man =

Unidentified object observed in Los Angeles

Jetpack man (also described as guy in a jetpack and Iron Man) is an unknown person or object observed flying what appeared to be an unauthorized jetpack around the Los Angeles area at least five times from 2020 to 2022. Multiple airplane pilots reported seeing the jetpack man at altitudes around 5,000 feet (1,500 m).

It is unknown whether each sighting was the same person, or whether it might have been a drone designed to look like a person with a jetpack. Neither jetpacks or large drones are commonly flown at that altitude or at that distance from land, and there were no sightings of a takeoff or landing. It was theorized by the FBI and the Federal Aviation Administration that the jetpack man was a novelty helium balloon.

== Sightings ==
=== First sighting ===
On August 30, 2020, two different airline pilots reported seeing a "guy in a jetpack" hovering near Los Angeles International Airport (LAX) at 3,000 feet (910 m), 300 yards (270 m) from the course of planes on a 10 miles (16 km) final approach.

American 1997: "Tower, American 1997, we just passed a guy in a jetpack... Off the left side, maybe 300 yards (270 m) or so, about our altitude."
Skywest pilot: "We just saw the guy passing by us in the jetpack."

=== Second sighting ===
In November 2020, a Los Angeles Police Department helicopter crew recorded a video of what appeared to be a balloon of the fictional character Jack Skellington from the film The Nightmare Before Christmas. The video was recorded over the Beverly Hills area. A balloon is believed by many to be the explanation for the phenomenon. The behavior of the balloon was similar in the footage to the jetpack man as it was and would later be described.

The LAPD later released the footage in November 2021. The Federal Bureau of Investigation released a statement on the matter, remarking that "the FBI has worked closely with the FAA to investigate reported jet pack sightings in the Los Angeles area, none of which have been verified," and later adding that "One working theory is that pilots might have seen balloons."

=== Third sighting ===
On October 14, 2020, a China Airlines flight reported seeing "a flying object like a flight suit jetpack" at 6,000 feet (1,800 m) during the approach to LAX.

=== Fourth sighting ===
On December 21, 2020, a pilot and flight instructor with Sling Pilot Academy captured the first video of such a flying object, at around 3,000 feet (910 m) near Palos Verdes and Catalina Island (south of Los Angeles). The academy posted the video to their Instagram account, commenting:

The video appears to show a jet pack, but it could also be a drone or some other object. If it is a 'guy in a jet pack' then it remains to be seen whether it is a legal test flight... or related to the jet pack sightings near LAX recently that caused disruptions to air traffic.

=== Fifth sighting ===
On July 28, 2021, a pilot reported seeing a flying object that looked like a man in a jetpack, roughly 15 miles (24 km) off the California coast, at 5,000 feet (1,500 m). In air traffic control chatter, the flying object was referred to variously as "the UFO" and "Iron Man".

747 pilot: "Possible jetpack man in sight... about 5000 ..."
LAX Tower: "Skywest 3626, did you see the... did you see the UFO?"
Skywest 3626 pilot: "We were looking but we did not see Iron Man."
LAX Tower: "Attention, all aircraft, use caution for the jetpack. He is just north of the final, around 5000 at Gate C, last reported [...]"
747 pilot: "Where'd you say Iron Man was flying around again?"
LAX Tower: "Around 5000, reported by a heavy 74 on a 15-mile final."

=== Sixth sighting ===
A sixth sighting of jetpack man occurred in June 2022 15 miles east of LAX at about 4,500 ft (1,400 m).

== See also ==
- Balloon boy hoax
- Lawnchair Larry flight
- 2010 California contrail incident
