= Balloon boy hoax =

2009 publicly stunt in Colorado, U.S.

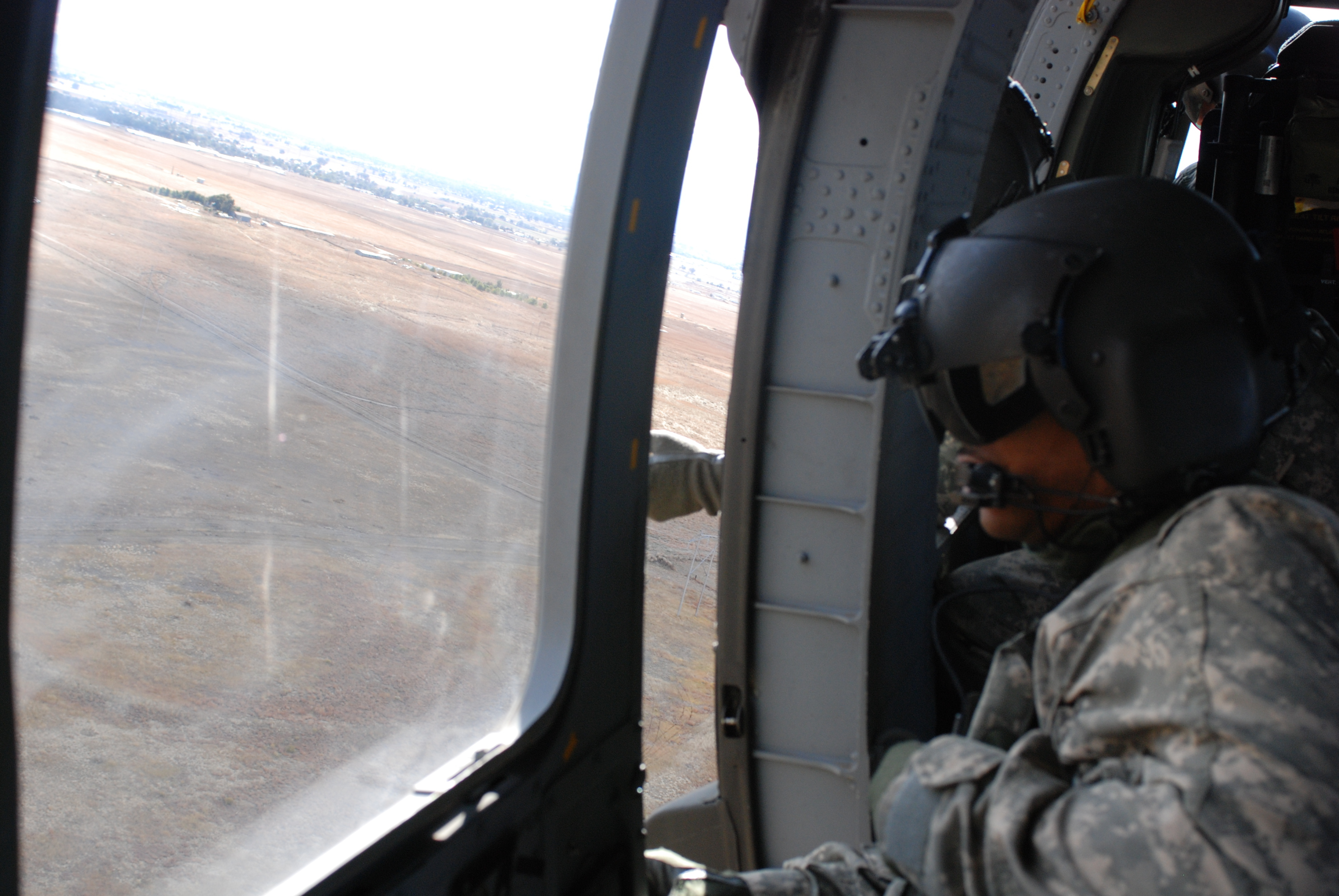
- A Colorado Army National Guard aviator searching for 6-year-old Falcon Heene
- Date: October 15, 2009
- Time: 11:29 a.m. – 1:35 p.m. MDT; (17:29 – 19:35 UTC)
- Location: Fort Collins, Colorado, U.S.; 40°30′38″N 105°4′27″W

On October 15, 2009, a homemade helium-filled gas balloon shaped to resemble a silver flying saucer was released into the atmosphere above Fort Collins, Colorado, by Richard and Mayumi Heene. They then claimed that their six-year-old son Falcon was trapped inside it. Authorities confirmed the balloon reached 7,000 feet (2,100 m) during its 90-minute flight. The event attracted worldwide attention, and Falcon was nicknamed "Balloon Boy" in the media.

National Guard helicopters and local police pursued the balloon. After flying for more than an hour and approximately 50 miles (80 km), the balloon landed about 12 miles (19 km) northeast of Denver International Airport. When Falcon was not found inside and it was reported that an object had been seen falling from the balloon, a search was begun. Later that day, the boy was found hiding in the attic of his home, where he had apparently been the entire time.

Suspicions of a hoax soon arose, particularly after an interview with Wolf Blitzer on Larry King Live that same evening. Asked why he was hiding, Falcon said to his father, "You guys said that, um, we did this for the show," apparently revealing that the Heenes had staged the incident as a publicity stunt. On October 18, 2009, Larimer County sheriff Jim Alderden announced his conclusion that the incident was a hoax and that the parents would likely face several felony charges. On November 13, 2009, Richard Heene pleaded guilty to attempting to influence a public servant. He was sentenced to 90 days in jail and ordered to pay $36,000 in restitution, and Mayumi Heene was sentenced to 20 days of weekend jail.

Following the incident, the Heene family has maintained their innocence, claiming that they were pressured into a guilty plea under the threat of Mayumi Heene's deportation. On December 23, 2020, the Heenes were pardoned by Governor Jared Polis.

== Background ==
Richard Heene (/ˈhiːni/) and Mayumi Iizuka met at an acting school in Los Angeles, and married in 1997. Heene had tried acting and stand-up comedy without success and, for a time, he and his wife ran a home business producing demo reels for actors. Heene is also a handyman. Associates described him as a "shameless self-promoter who would do almost anything to advance his latest endeavor". Heene became a storm chaser in the 1970s after a storm took the roof off a building he was working on. Heene's storm chasing has included riding a motorcycle into a tornado and reportedly flying a plane around the perimeter of Hurricane Wilma in 2005. He regularly involved his children in his endeavors, taking them along on UFO-hunting expeditions and storm-chasing missions. The Heenes have three sons named Falcon, Bradford and Ryo.

A domestic violence investigation was launched at the Heenes' home in February 2009, after Mayumi was seen with a mark on her cheek and broken blood vessels in her left eye. No charges were filed due to lack of evidence.

The family had been featured on the reality television show Wife Swap on two occasions, the second time as a fan-favorite choice for the show's 100th episode. During his time on the show, Heene expressed his alleged belief that humanity descended from aliens and spoke of launching home-made flying saucers into storms. Heene had unsuccessfully sought the media's interest in a proposed reality show called The PSIence Detectives, which he envisioned as a documentary series "to investigate the mysteries of science". Months before the balloon incident Heene had pitched a reality show idea to the television channel TLC, but the network passed on the offer. After the balloon incident, the producer of Wife Swap said that a show involving the Heenes had been in development, but that the deal was now off. The producer declined to provide specifics. The Lifetime channel had been set to air one of the Wife Swap episodes involving the Heenes on October 29, 2009, but the station pulled the episode because of the balloon incident.

=== Helium balloon ===
Richard Heene said the saucer-shaped balloon was an early prototype of a vehicle which "people can pull out of their garage and hover above traffic". He also stated that, once "the high voltage timer" was switched on, the balloon "would emit one million volts every five minutes for one minute" in order to "move left and right—horizontal".

The balloon, 20 feet (6.1 m) in diameter and 5 feet (1.5 m) high, was constructed from plastic tarps taped together, covered with an aluminum foil and held together with string and duct tape. Its base, in which Falcon allegedly rode, was a box made from a very thin piece of plywood and cardboard on the side, also held together by string and duct tape.

Fully inflated, a balloon of this size would contain just over 1,000 cubic feet (28 m^{3}) of helium. Helium's lift capacity at sea level and 0 °C is 1.113 kg/m^{3} (0.07 lbs/ft^{3}) and decreases at higher altitudes and at higher temperatures. The volume of helium in the balloon has been estimated as being able to lift a total load, including the balloon material and the structure beneath it, of 65 pounds (29 kg) at sea level and 48 pounds (22 kg) at 8,000 feet (2,400 m).

Fort Collins is at an elevation of about 5,000 feet (1,500 m) and the balloon was estimated to have reached 7,000 feet (2,100 m).

== Incident ==
Location of Fort Collins in Larimer County in Colorado

The family said they first suspected Falcon Heene was missing when, immediately after the balloon had taken off, Falcon's brother told them that he had seen the six-year-old climb into the balloon's basket beforehand. A home video released the following day shows the launch of the balloon. Richard inspects the basket, then his family count down in unison "three, two, one" before releasing the cord. Apparently believing the balloon to be tethered a few feet from the ground, the family starts screaming in distress when it floats off into the sky. Richard Heene, who can be seen kicking the wood frame that supported the balloon, yelled amidst myriad obscene words, "You didn't put the fucking tether down!" Falcon is nowhere to be seen and nobody mentions the possibility of Falcon being in the balloon.

According to initial reports from the sheriff, the family first called the Federal Aviation Administration, although later the sheriff's office stated that "they had no confirmation that Richard Heene actually made the call to the FAA." They then called Denver NBC affiliate KUSA-TV; they reportedly requested that the station send a news helicopter to track the balloon's progress, and then called emergency services. During the call to 911 at 11:29 a.m. local time (MDT) Richard Heene said, "I don't know whether it's possible you guys could detect the electricity that it emits ... it emits a million volts on the outer skin."

The balloon, tracked by helicopters, drifted for 60 miles (97 km), passing through Adams County and Weld County. Planes were rerouted around the balloon's flight path. Reports that Denver International Airport was briefly shut down were later determined to be incorrect. The balloon finally landed two hours later at around 1:35 p.m. local time near Keenesburg, 12 miles (19 km) northeast of Denver International Airport.

When the boy was not found inside the balloon, officials expressed concern that he might have fallen out during the flight. Although it was reported that it did not appear breached, Margie Martinez of the Weld County Sheriff's Office said that the door was unlocked in the balloon. A sheriff deputy reported seeing something fall from the balloon near Platteville, Colorado, and a photograph of the balloon in flight with a small black dot below was said to suggest the boy may have fallen out or that something had detached from the balloon. Search and rescue crews in Colorado searched for the boy.

At approximately 4:14 p.m., CNN and other news reported that the boy was found hiding in a cardboard box in rafters above the garage, but county sheriff Jim Alderden later said, "For all we know he may have been two blocks down the road playing on the swing in the city park."

The total cost of the search and rescue efforts was estimated at over $40,000. The helicopter flights alone during the rescue operation cost about $14,500. The Colorado National Guard assisted the effort with UH-60 Black Hawk and OH-58 Kiowa helicopters.

== Hoax allegations and criminal investigation ==
=== Investigation ===
After the incident, several news agencies began questioning whether it was a hoax. Editor & Publisher pointed out that "few had raised the issue of whether such a balloon could even lift off with a 50-pound (23 kg) kid inside and then float the way it did" during the flight. The police initially said it did not appear to be a hoax, but when Falcon and his family were being interviewed later in the day by Wolf Blitzer on CNN's Larry King Live he asked Falcon, "Why did you not come out of the garage?" After his parents repeated the question, he responded, "You guys said that, um, we did this for the show." Blitzer questioned Heene and Falcon further after the statement was made. The next day, during interviews on ABC's Good Morning America and NBC's Today, the boy vomited when he was asked about his comment and again when his father was asked about it, fueling more suspicion.

Falcon's answers prompted the sheriff's office to pursue further investigations as to whether the incident was part of a publicity stunt. On October 16, Alderden said that "the suggestion that the boy [...] was coached to hide seems inconceivable."

Researcher Robert Thomas sold a story to Gawker alleging that he had helped plan a publicity stunt involving a weather balloon and investigators expressed a desire to interview him. Larimer County Sheriff's officials had consulted a Colorado State University physics professor, Brian Jones, who initially determined, based on the dimensions provided by Richard Heene, that the balloon could plausibly lift off with a boy of Falcon's reported size (37 pounds or 17 kilograms). However, when authorities later measured the balloon, they concluded it was not large enough to lift the child. Upon inspecting the balloon, authorities learned it weighed 18 pounds (8.2 kg) more than Heene had said. Alderden said the base of the balloon could have handled 37 pounds (17 kg) without breaking, but to get airborne with those 37 pounds (17 kg) inside it would have to have been attached to a larger balloon.

After viewing the home video of the balloon launch, Alderden said the balloon appeared to have been rising very quickly.

During a press conference on October 18, Alderden called the incident a hoax, stating "we believe we have evidence at this point to indicate that this was a publicity stunt in hopes to better market themselves for a reality show." He also said that charges in the case have not yet been filed but that the parents could face both misdemeanor and felony charges, including conspiracy to commit a crime, contributing to the delinquency of a minor, filing a false report with authorities and attempting to influence a public servant. Alderden stated that his comments on October 16 were part of a "game plan" to keep the Heenes' trust.

Richard Heene's lawyer, David Lane, announced on October 19 that Richard and Mayumi Heene would surrender to police as soon as charges were filed, and plead not guilty.

Throughout the Balloon boy hoax investigation, the couple had a list of potential fines and penalties before the sentencing began. The Federal Aviation Administration (FAA) proposed a fine of $11,000 USD for the "launching of an unauthorized aircraft." An FAA spokesman, Mike Fergus, later revealed that they had completed their investigation, but no details were released after the investigation. The couple also had proposed fines for Richard Heene for committing a class 4 felony; he could have received two to six years in prison and fines between $2,000 to $500,000. Mayumi Heene was also facing a potential penalty; by committing a class 3 misdemeanor, she could receive up to six months in prison and a fine ranging from $50 to $750.

According to the supporting affidavit that law enforcement submitted with their application for a search warrant, Mayumi later admitted that she "knew all along that Falcon was hiding in the residence." The affidavit alleges that the couple planned the hoax about two weeks before releasing the balloon on October 15 and "instructed their three children to lie to authorities as well as the media regarding this hoax", for the purpose of making the family "more marketable for future media interests."

=== Guilty plea ===
Richard Heene's attorney announced on November 12, 2009, that both parents intended to plead guilty to the charges filed against them, for which the prosecutor would recommend probation. The attorney's statement said that the threat of deportation of his wife, Mayumi Heene, who is a Japanese citizen, was a major factor in the plea negotiations. On November 13, Richard Heene pleaded guilty to a felony charge of attempting to influence a public servant. Mayumi Heene did not appear with him, but still faced a misdemeanor charge of false reporting to authorities.

On December 23, 2009, a judge sentenced Richard Heene to 90 days in jail and 100 hours of community service. He was also ordered to write a formal apology to the agencies that searched for Falcon. Mayumi Heene was sentenced to 20 days in jail, to be served through jail-supervised community service for two days a week. Mayumi was also allowed to begin her sentence after her husband's ended in order to ensure her children would be cared for, and the Heenes were also banned from receiving any profits from the hoax for several years. Richard Heene was also ordered to pay $36,000 in restitution. Governor Polis issued pardons to the Heenes in 2020, saying they had already "paid the price in the eyes of the public" and that it was time for Colorado to move on from the case as it was a waste of precious time of the law enforcement, military enforcement, and the general public. Polis eventually removed Mayumi's misdemeanor charge and Richard's felony charge from their records, stating they deserved a second chance and still have the burden of guilt on them. Polis said, "It's time to no longer let a permanent criminal record from the balloon boy saga follow and drag down the parents for the rest of their lives."

=== Post-conviction developments ===
On January 7, 2010, Richard Heene began to claim in media interviews that he only pleaded guilty to prevent his wife's potential deportation. In a 2015 interview with Today, Heene repeated the claim that the incident was not a hoax. In a 2019 interview with ABC News, the Heene family continued to maintain that the incident was not a hoax, with Mayumi Heene claiming to have confessed out of fear of deportation.

In an interview with the family for 5280, Mayumi brought forth handwritten notes for her attorney recounting the days preceding the event. In them, she details the original plan was to have Falcon hide in the basement, where the family would discover him and call off the search. However, Falcon instead hid in the attic above the garage, creating genuine confusion and genuine tearfulness at their reunion. When 5280 confronted Richard about the existence of the notes, he reacted angrily towards Mayumi, during which she admitted to fabricating the story in the handwritten notes to save her family's reputation.

== Media attention ==
For hours, the incident received extensive media coverage in many parts of the world, with local TV helicopters broadcasting live video of the balloon and rescue operation. The incident also sparked a "balloon boy" Internet meme, as the events were closely followed in blogs and social networking sites in real time, generating speculation, image editing jokes and parodies of the story, which started even when the boy's safety was uncertain. "Balloon boy" became the No. 1 search on Google within hours of the event and 34 of the top 40 searches on Google were related to Falcon Heene and the incident. On Saturday Night Live's Weekend Update, the balloon was interviewed by Seth Meyers.

In July 2011, Richard Heene auctioned the balloon, selling it to Mike Fruitman—an Aurora, Colorado businessman—for $2,502. Heene said that proceeds would go to victims of the March 2011 Tohoku earthquake and tsunami.

=== Criticism ===
Editor & Publisher noted that "only after the crash did TV hosts stress that reports of [a] boy in it were 'unverified' and raise the possibility of a hoax."

Experts and commentators also criticized the media's vetting process, questioned the separation between journalism and reality television and raised concerns about the exploitation of children for news stories. Robert Thompson, of the Bleier Center for Television and Popular Culture at Syracuse University, said that the incident "was a wake-up call to the media but it's a wake-up call that every single one of us is going to sleep through." Thompson blamed technology rather than the media for the problem: "There are two technological phenomena driving this—one is television satellite trucks and the ability to broadcast from anywhere and two is an unlimited number of platforms to place this stuff."

== Documentary ==
The hoax is the subject of Balloon Boy, a documentary short film directed by Arlin Golden and Brian Gersten. It consists of archival news footage.

A Netflix documentary film about the hoax titled Trainwreck: Balloon Boy which was written and directed by Gillian Pachter was released on July 15, 2025.

== See also ==
- Jetpack man, alleged unauthorized aerial vehicle and possible balloon in 2020s California
- Lawnchair Larry flight
