= Trainwreck: Balloon Boy =

2025 American documentary film by Gillian Pachter

- Film poster
- Directed by: Gillian Pachter
- Produced by: Cheryl Hockey
- Starring: Richard Heene
- Cinematography: Ryan Earl Parker
- Distributed by: Netflix
- Release date: July 15, 2025
- Running time: 52 minutes
- Country: United States
- Language: English

Trainwreck: Balloon Boy is a 2025 American documentary film directed by Gillian Pachter regarding the Balloon boy hoax. It premiered on Netflix on July 15, 2025, as part of the Trainwreck series.

== Background ==
The film documents the 2009 "Balloon Boy" incident in Fort Collins, Colorado, when Richard and Mayumi Heene claimed that their six-year-old son Falcon had floated away in Richard's homemade helium balloon. The event sparked a nationwide panic and live international news coverage before Falcon was found safe at home, hiding in the attic.

== Synopsis ==
The documentary reexamines the case sixteen years later through new interviews with the Heene family, journalists and investigators. The Heenes continue to maintain their innocence, arguing the event was misunderstood and not a publicity stunt, while others in the film argue that the Heenes only did it for viral fame. By August 2025, the documentary received 7 million views.

== Cast ==
- Richard Heene
- Mayumi Heene
- Bradford Heene
- Tina Chavez
- Dean Askew
- Bob Heffernan
- Jimmy Negri
- Robert Sanchez
- Brian Willie
- Jim Alderden
- Falcon Heene
- Sheree Silver
- David Lane
- Ryo Heene
- Tim Masters
- Kim Christiansen
- Diane Sawyer

=== Archival footage ===
- Wolf Blitzer
