= Cluster ballooning =

Form of ballooning

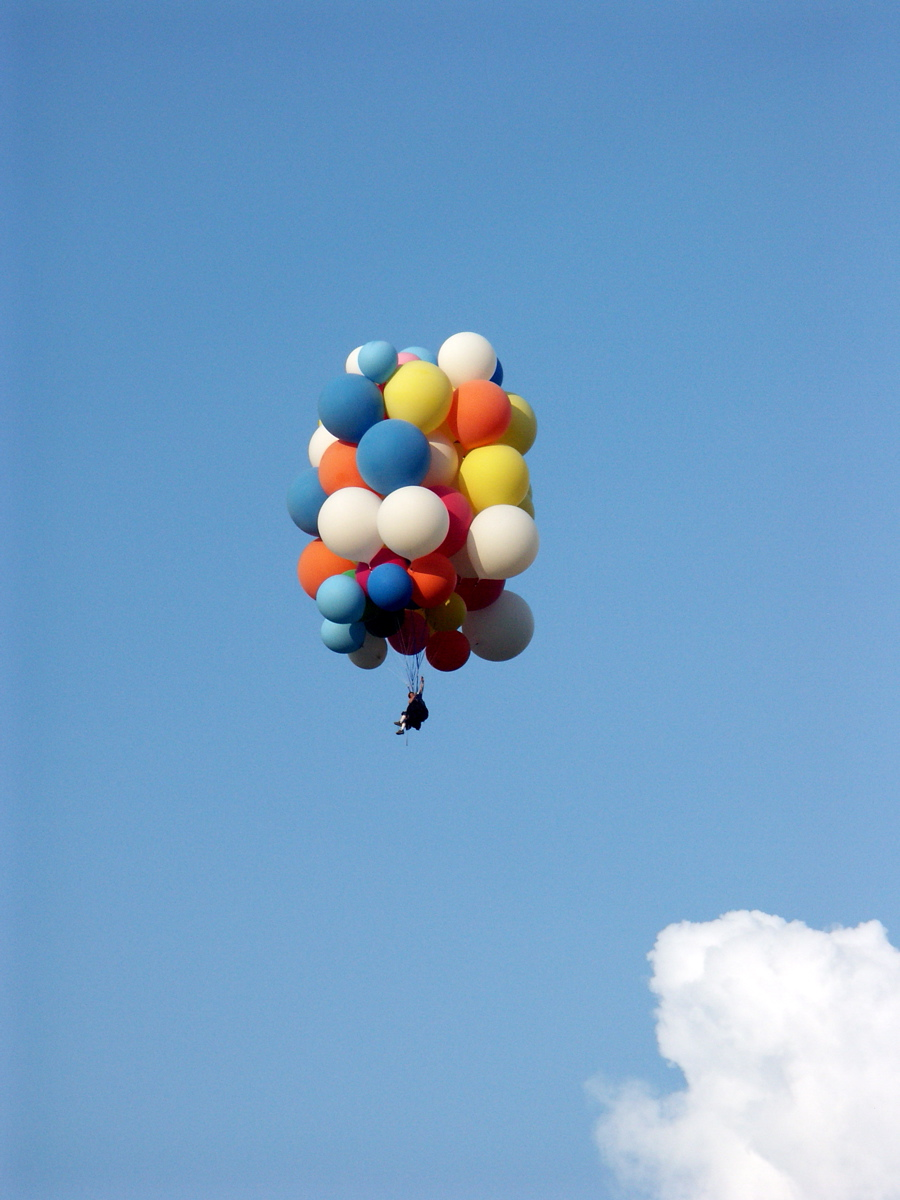
Cluster ballooning

Cluster ballooning is an extreme sport and a form of ballooning where a harness attaches a balloonist to a cluster of helium-inflated rubber balloons.

Unlike traditional hot-air balloons, where a single large balloon is equipped with vents enabling altitude control, cluster balloons are multiple, small, readily available and individually sealed balloons. To control flight, arrest a climb or initiate a descent, the pilot incrementally jettisons or deflates balloons. Ballast, e.g., bottled water, can also be jettisoned to facilitate ascent.

== Notable flights and balloonists ==
The Swiss adventurer Jean Piccard experimented with cluster balloon flight in Rochester, Minnesota, in July 1937.

In September of the same year, inspired by Piccard, an American photographer for Paramount News used 32 weather balloons for a feature photography assignment near Old Orchard Beach in Maine. Suspended from the balloons by a parachute harness in order to take aerial film footage, his mooring rope broke and he was lifted approximately 700 feet (210 m) into the air. A clergyman, Father James J. Mullen, spotted the incident, and after a chase of some 13 miles (21 km), used a .22 caliber rifle to shoot out three of the balloons, thus allowing the photographer to return safely to the ground.

In the Lawnchair Larry flight, Larry Walters, without any prior ballooning experience, attached 43 helium-filled weather balloons to a lawn chair and lifted off in 1982. In defending against charges later filed against him by the FAA, he stated that he intended to rise just a few hundred feet (about 100 metres), but underestimated helium's lifting power, causing his tethering strap to break prematurely. Walters quickly rose to nearly 3 miles (5 km), over 50 times his intended maximum altitude. Walters reportedly had planned to control his altitude by using a pellet gun to selectively pop some of the balloons. However, he was initially hesitant to shoot any balloons, as he was concerned about falling out due to a loss of stability. Reaching a high altitude and seeing no other way of getting down, he eventually shot several of the balloons, initiating his descent.

John Ninomiya's flights made on May 28, 2006 have been featured on The Science Channel, The History Channel, TechTV, TLC, and MTV.

The Guinness Book of World Records recognizes the highest altitude attained via cluster ballooning to be that achieved by Mike Howard (UK) and Steve Davis (US), who on August 4, 2001, over Los Lunas, New Mexico, US, used 400 helium balloons to reach a height of over 18,300 feet (5,600 m). Larry Walters is estimated to have reached 16,000 feet (4,900 m) in 1982. His record is not recognized, however, because he did not carry a proper altimeter. On June 8, 2013, Joe Barbera, of La Center, Washington, launched a lawn chair with cluster balloons and recorded a new altitude record of 21,194 feet (6,460 m). This is a pending world record being considered by Guinness World Records.

Yoshikazu Suzuki launched from the shore of Lake Biwa, Japan, on 23 November 1992 in a small gondola lifted by helium-filled balloons, attempting a long-distance flight toward the United States. After an SOS signal from his emergency beacon, a Japan Coast Guard search aircraft sighted him on the morning of 25 November at about 2,500 metres altitude off Miyagi Prefecture; he reportedly indicated he intended to continue, the distress signal ceased, and he was never seen again.

In April 2008, in Brazil, Roman Catholic priest Adelir Antonio de Carli ascended with 1000 balloons. Ground observers lost track of him when he floated out above the ocean, and he was missing until part of his body was recovered by an offshore oil rig support vessel on 5 July 2008. Carli at one point reached an altitude of 6,000 metres (19,685 ft) before losing contact with authorities.

Just two months later, in June 2008, FAA licensed pilot Jonathan Trappe attached a cluster of balloons to his standard, unmodified office chair and flew it to an altitude of 14,783 feet (4,506 m). The flight reportedly lasted for four hours and covered 50 miles (80 km) before Trappe returned to earth, retired the chair, and returned it to his workplace. On May 28, 2010, Sky News reported on Trappe's crossing of the English Channel by cluster balloon. Trappe departed near Challock, England, crossed over the White Cliffs of Dover at St. Margarets Bay, and made landfall again over Dunkirk, France. Trappe then tracked inland, and landed safely in a farmer's cabbage patch. Three years later, Trappe attempted a trans-Atlantic crossing, but his journey stopped short when he was forced to land in Newfoundland.

On September 2, 2020, illusionist David Blaine reached 24,900 feet (7,600 m) via 52 helium-filled balloons, suspended by harness attached to a cable routed through his sleeve to appear as if holding the balloons by one hand. He had all necessary licenses and permissions, carried an oxygen supply, ADS-B transponder, and remote control of ballast and balloon-popping squibs. He released himself from the balloons and free-fell until his parachute automatically opened at 7,000 feet (2,100 m). The balloon rig was then remotely piloted by the ground team to a safe recovery.

== Other applications ==
Smaller balloon clusters consisting of several toy balloons are sometimes used for creating flying light effects by using them as a carrier for lightsticks or other small light sources. They can be also used for other amateur scientific experiments, such as making aerial photographs or atmospheric measurements.

Such toy balloons, with or without helium filling, are more readily available than bigger balloons.

In 1975, students at the University of Connecticut built and flew the Lumpy blimp, the envelope of which contained three weather balloons.

== See also ==
- Hopper balloon
- Kent Couch
- The Red Balloon, 1956 film
- Napoleon, 1995 film
- Danny Deckchair, 2003 film
- Up, 2009 film
