= List of accolades received by Up =

Up awards and nominations
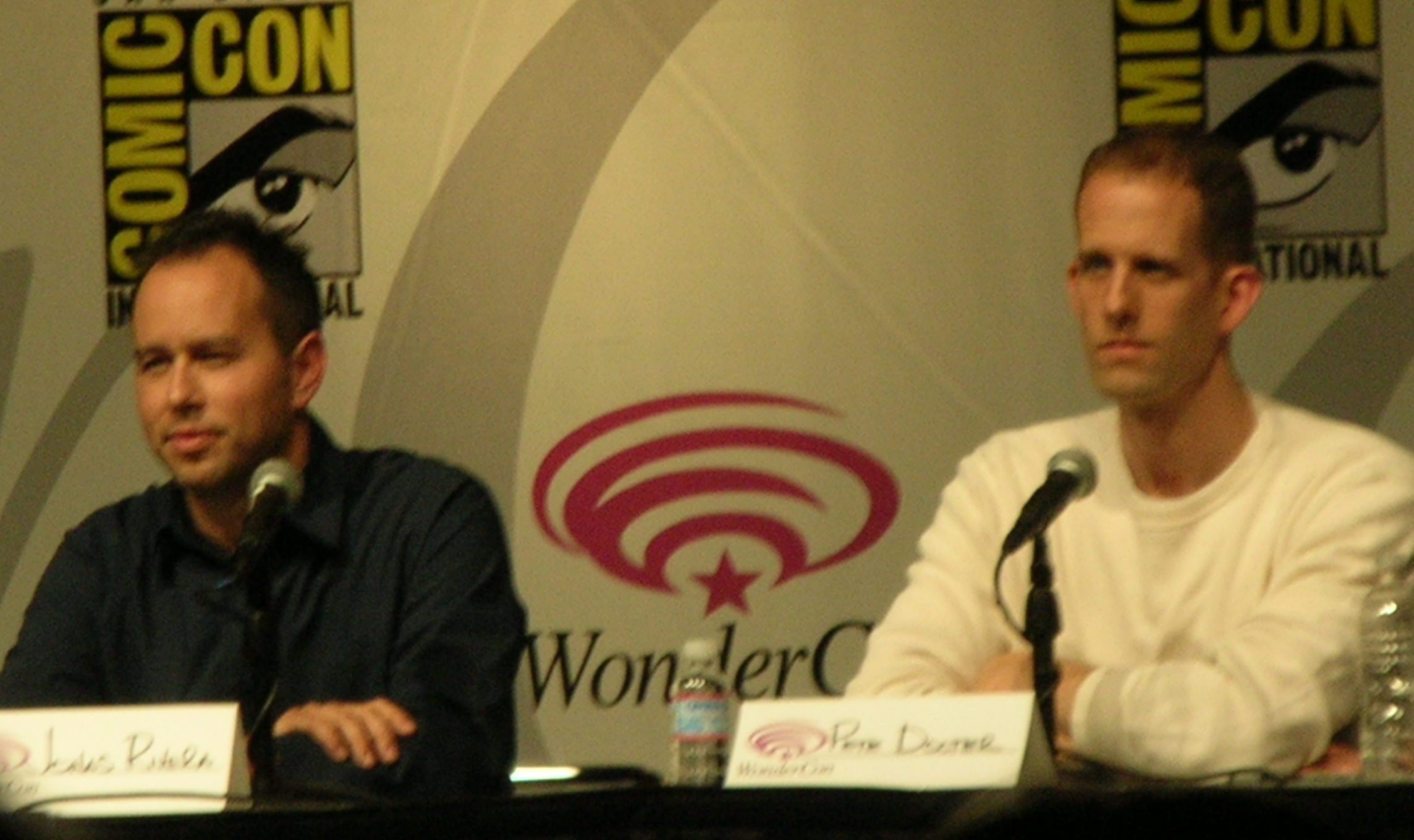
- Pete Docter (right) won the Academy Award for Best Animated Feature while Jonas Rivera (left) was nominated for the Academy Award for Best Picture.
Awards and nominations
Award	Wins	Nominations
Academy Awards	2	5
Annie Awards	2	9
Artios Awards	1	1
Austin Film Critics Association Awards	2	2
BAFTA Awards	2	4
Blimper Award	1	1
Chicago Film Critics Association Awards	2	3
Columbus Film Critics Association Awards	2	2
Critics' Choice Awards	2	4
Dallas-Fort Worth Film Critics Association Awards	1	1
East West Players	2	2
Eddie Awards	1	1
Florida Film Critics Circle Awards	1	1
Golden Eagle Award	0	1
Golden Globe Awards	2	2
Golden Reel Awards	1	1
Golden Tomatoes Awards	1	1
Grammy Awards	2	3
Hugo Awards	0	1
Irish Film and Television Awards	0	1
Kansas City Film Critics Circle Awards	1	1
Motion Picture Producer of the Year Award	1	2
National Board of Review Awards	1	1
Online Film Critics Society Awards	2	4
Palm Dog Award	1	1
Phoenix Film Critics Society Awards	3	3
Satellite Awards	0	3
Saturn Awards	0	2
Southeastern Film Critics Association Awards	1	1
Teen Choice Awards	1	1
Visual Effects Society	3	3
Washington D.C. Area Film Critics Association Awards	1	3
Women Film Critics Circle	1	1

Totals (Note: Certain award groups do not simply award one winner. They acknowledge several different recipients, have runners-up, and have third place. Since this is a specific recognition and is different from losing an award, runner-up mentions are considered wins in this award tally. For simplification and to avoid errors, each award in this list has been presumed to have had a prior nomination.)
- Wins: 43
- Nominations: 70

Up is a 2009 American animated film directed by Pete Docter, who co-wrote the script with Bob Peterson. It stars the voices of Ed Asner, Christopher Plummer, Jordan Nagai, and Peterson. The film centers on elderly widower Carl Fredricksen (Asner) and Wilderness Explorer Russell (Nagai), who go on a journey to South America to fulfill a promise that Carl made to his late wife Ellie. Along the way, they encounter a talking dog named Dug (Peterson) and a giant bird named Kevin, who is being hunted by the explorer Charles Muntz (Plummer).

Up premiered at the 62nd Cannes Film Festival on May 13, 2009, and was released in theaters in the United States on May 29. It earned $735 million worldwide, making it the sixth highest-grossing film of 2009. On the review aggregator website Rotten Tomatoes, Up holds an approval rating of 98% based on 291 reviews.

Up garnered various awards and nominations, primarily in the Best Animated Picture and Best Music categories, the latter composed by Michael Giacchino. Up was nominated for five Academy Awards at the 2010 ceremony, winning two: Best Animated Feature and Best Original Score. It was the second fully animated film to be nominated for the Academy Award for Best Picture, following Beauty and the Beast (1991). Up became the third consecutive Pixar film to win the Academy Award for Animated Feature, after Ratatouille (2007) and WALL-E (2008). The film also won the Golden Globe for Best Animated Feature Film and Best Original Score at the 67th Golden Globe Awards. Up received nine nominations for the Annie Awards in eight categories, winning Best Animated Feature and Best Directing in a Feature Production. It also was selected as the Summer Movie Comedy at the 2009 Teen Choice Awards, and received three Grammy Award nominations at 52nd Grammy Awards, winning two. Rivera received the Producer of the Year Award from the Producers Guild of America, while Docter, Peterson and Giacchino were honored with British Academy of Film and Television Arts (BAFTA) awards for their work on the film.

== Accolades ==
Award	Date of ceremony	Category	Recipients	Result	Ref.
Academy Awards	March 7, 2010	Best Picture	Jonas Rivera	Nominated	
Academy Awards	March 7, 2010	Best Original Screenplay	Pete Docter (screenplay/story), Bob Peterson (screenplay/story), and Tom McCarthy (story)	Nominated	
Academy Awards	March 7, 2010	Best Animated Feature	Pete Docter	Won	
Academy Awards	March 7, 2010	Best Original Score	Michael Giacchino	Won	
Academy Awards	March 7, 2010	Best Sound Editing	Tom Myers and Michael Silvers	Nominated	
Annie Awards	February 6, 2010	Best Animated Feature	Pete Docter and Bob Peterson	Won	
Annie Awards	February 6, 2010	Best Animated Effects	Eric Froemling	Nominated	
Annie Awards	February 6, 2010	Best Character Animation in a Feature Production	Daniel Nguyen	Nominated	
Annie Awards	February 6, 2010	Best Character Design in a Feature Production	Daniel López Muñoz	Nominated	
Annie Awards	February 6, 2010	Best Directing in a Feature Production	Pete Docter	Won	
Annie Awards	February 6, 2010	Best Music in a Feature Production	Michael Giacchino	Nominated	
Annie Awards	February 6, 2010	Best Storyboarding in a Feature Production	Ronnie Del Carmen	Nominated	
Annie Awards	February 6, 2010	Best Storyboarding in a Feature Production	Peter Sohn	Nominated	
Annie Awards	February 6, 2010	Best Writing in a Feature Production	Pete Docter, Tom McCarthy, and Bob Peterson	Nominated	
Artios Awards	November 2, 2009	Outstanding Achievement in Casting – Animation Feature	Natalie Lyon and Kevin Reher	Won	
Austin Film Critics Award	December 15, 2009	Best Animated Film		Won	
Austin Film Critics Award	December 15, 2009	Best Music	Michael Giacchino	Won	
British Academy Film Awards	February 21, 2010	Best Animated Film	Pete Docter and Bob Peterson	Won	
British Academy Film Awards	February 21, 2010	Best Film Music	Michael Giacchino	Won	
British Academy Film Awards	February 21, 2010	Best Original Screenplay	Pete Docter and Bob Peterson	Nominated	
British Academy Film Awards	February 21, 2010	Best Sound	Tom Myers, Michael Semanick, and Michael Silvers	Nominated	
Chicago Film Critics Association Awards	December 21, 2009	Best Animated Feature		Won	
Chicago Film Critics Association Awards	December 21, 2009	Best Original Score	Michael Giacchino	Won	
Chicago Film Critics Association Awards	December 21, 2009	Best Original Screenplay	Bob Peterson	Nominated	
Columbus Film Critics Association Awards	January 7, 2010	Best Score	Michael Giacchino	Won	
Columbus Film Critics Association Awards	January 7, 2010	Best Animated Feature	Up	Won	
Critics Choice Awards	January 15, 2010	Best Animated Feature		Won	
Critics Choice Awards	January 15, 2010	Best Picture		Nominated	
Critics Choice Awards	January 15, 2010	Best Score	Michael Giacchino	Won	
Critics Choice Awards	January 15, 2010	Best Original Screenplay	Pete Docter and Bob Peterson	Nominated	
Dallas-Fort Worth Film Critics Association Awards	December 16, 2009	Best Animated Film		Won	
Eddie Awards	February 14, 2010	Best Edited Animated Feature Film	Kevin Nolting	Won	
East West Players	April 19, 2010	Breakout Performance Award	Jordan Nagai	Won	
East West Players	April 19, 2010	EWP Visionary Award	Pixar	Won	
Florida Film Critics Circle Awards	December 21, 2009	Best Animated Feature		Won	
Golden Eagle Award	January 21, 2011	Best Foreign Language Film	Up	Nominated	
Golden Globe Awards	January 17, 2010	Best Animated Feature Film	Pete Docter and Bob Peterson	Won	
Golden Globe Awards	January 17, 2010	Best Original Score	Michael Giacchino	Won	
Golden Reel Awards	February 20, 2010	Best Sound Editing – Sound Effects, Foley, Music, Dialogue and ADR Animation in a Feature Film		Won	
Golden Tomatoes Awards	January 10, 2010	Wide Release		Won	
Grammy Awards	January 31, 2010	Best Instrumental Arrangement	Michael Giacchino and Tim Simonec	Nominated	
Grammy Awards	January 31, 2010	Best Instrumental Composition	Michael Giacchino	Won	
Grammy Awards	January 31, 2010	Best Score Soundtrack Album	Michael Giacchino	Won	
Hugo Awards	September 5, 2010	Best Dramatic Presentation, Long Form	Pete Docter, Tom McCarthy, and Bob Peterson	Nominated	
Irish Film and Television Awards	February 20, 2010	Best International Film		Nominated	
Kansas City Film Critics Circle Awards	January 3, 2010	Best Animated Film		Won	
National Board of Review of Motion Pictures Awards	January 14, 2010	Best Animated Feature		Won	
Nickelodeon Kids' Choice Awards	March 27, 2010	Favorite Animated Movie		Won	
Online Film Critics Society Awards	January 6, 2010	Best Animated Film	Pete Docter	Won	
Online Film Critics Society Awards	January 6, 2010	Best Original Score	Michael Giacchino	Won	
Online Film Critics Society Awards	January 6, 2010	Best Picture		Nominated	
Online Film Critics Society Awards	January 6, 2010	Best Original Screenplay	Bob Peterson	Nominated	
Palm Dog Award	May 22, 2009	Best Canine Performance during the Cannes Film Festival	"Dug"	Won	
Phoenix Film Critics Society Awards	December 22, 2009	Best Animated Film		Won	
Phoenix Film Critics Society Awards	December 22, 2009	Best Original Score	Michael Giacchino	Won	
Phoenix Film Critics Society Awards	December 22, 2009	Best Screenplay Written Directly for the Screen	Pete Docter and Bob Peterson	Won	
Producers Guild of America Award	January 24, 2010	Animated Theatrical Motion Pictures	Jonas Rivera	Won	
Producers Guild of America Award	January 24, 2010	Theatrical Motion Pictures	Jonas Rivera	Nominated	
Satellite Awards	December 20, 2009	Best Animated or Mixed Media Feature	Pete Docter and Bob Peterson	Nominated	
Satellite Awards	December 20, 2009	Best Original Screenplay	Pete Docter and Bob Peterson	Nominated	
Satellite Awards	December 20, 2009	Best Original Score	Michael Giacchino	Nominated	
Saturn Awards	June 24, 2010	Best Animated Film	Pete Docter	Nominated	
Saturn Awards	June 24, 2010	Best Music	Michael Giacchino	Nominated	
Southeastern Film Critics Association Awards	December 13, 2009	Best Animated Feature		Won	
Teen Choice Awards	August 9, 2009	Choice Summer Movie: Comedy		Won	
Visual Effects Society	February 10, 2010	Outstanding Animation in an Animated Feature Motion Picture	Gary Bruins, Pete Docter, Steve May, and Jonas Rivera	Won	
Visual Effects Society	February 10, 2010	Outstanding Animated Character in an Animated Feature Motion Picture	Ed Asner, Carmen Ngai, Brian Tindall, and Ron Zorman	Won	
Visual Effects Society	February 10, 2010	Outstanding Effects Animation in an Animated Feature Motion Picture	Alexis Angelidis, Eric Froemling, Jason Johnston, and Jon Reisch	Won	
Washington D.C. Area Film Critics Association Awards	December 7, 2009	Best Animated Feature		Won	
Washington D.C. Area Film Critics Association Awards	December 7, 2009	Best Film		Nominated	
Washington D.C. Area Film Critics Association Awards	December 7, 2009	Best Original Screenplay	Pete Docter and Bob Peterson	Nominated	
Women Film Critics Circle	December 9, 2009	Best Family Film		Won	
