= Adrian Nicholas =

British skydiver (1962–2005)

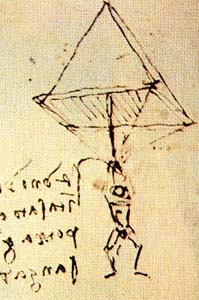
Da Vinci's pyramidal design of c. 1485, successfully tested in 2000 by Adrian Nicholas

Attended Aldenham School (1975 - 1980)

Adrian Nicholas (4 March 1962 – 17 September 2005) was a British skydiver who completed more than 8,000 jumps in 30 countries.

He is best known for his successful test in July 2000 of Leonardo da Vinci's (1452–1519) parachute design, proving it to be in retrospect the world's first working parachute. A modified pyramidal design was later also successfully tested by his Swiss colleague Olivier Vietti-Teppa.

== World records ==
On 12 March 1999, Nicholas stepped out of an aeroplane at 35,850 feet (10,930 m). He flew for 4 minutes, 55 seconds and covered a distance of 10 miles (16 km), establishing new world records for the longest sky dive and the furthest human flight. During the attempt the exhaust valve of his oxygen mask froze preventing him from breathing properly for about four minutes.

== Death ==
On 17 September 2005 Nicholas was jumping in Texel, the Netherlands. While performing a high speed landing manoeuvre, his automatic activation device fired at approximately 750 feet (230 metres) above the ground and deployed his reserve parachute. He attempted to correct the situation by releasing his main parachute, however, he still hit the ground hard enough that he died at the scene as a result of his injuries.
