= Up (2009 film) =

2009 animated film directed by Pete Docter

- Theatrical release poster
- Directed by: Pete Docter
- Screenplay by: Bob Peterson; Pete Docter
- Story by: Pete Docter; Bob Peterson; Tom McCarthy
- Produced by: Jonas Rivera
- Starring: Ed Asner; Christopher Plummer; Jordan Nagai; Bob Peterson
- Cinematography: Patrick Lin; Jean-Claude Kalache
- Edited by: Kevin Nolting
- Music by: Michael Giacchino
- Production company: Pixar Animation Studios
- Distributed by: Walt Disney Studios; Motion Pictures (Note: Distributed under the Walt Disney Pictures banner.)
- Release dates: May 13, 2009 (Cannes); May 29, 2009 (United States)
- Running time: 96 minutes
- Country: United States
- Language: English
- Budget: $175 million
- Box office: $735 million

Up is a 2009 American animated adventure film directed by Pete Docter who co-wrote it with Bob Peterson. Produced by Pixar Animation Studios for Walt Disney Pictures, the film centers on Carl Fredricksen (voiced by Ed Asner), an elderly widower who, by attaching numerous helium balloons to his house, travels to Venezuela with youngster Russell (voiced by Jordan Nagai) in order to fulfill a promise that he made to his late wife. Along the way, they befriend a talking dog (voiced by Peterson) as well as an exotic bird and encounter Carl's childhood idol Charles Muntz (voiced by Christopher Plummer), who has sinister plans to capture the bird.

Originally titled Heliums, Docter conceived the outline for Up in 2004 based on fantasies of escaping from life when it became too irritating. He and eleven other Pixar artists spent three days in Venezuela for research and inspiration. The designs of the characters were caricatured and stylized considerably, and animators were challenged with creating realistic cloth. Composer Michael Giacchino composed the film's score. It was Pixar's first film to be presented in Disney Digital 3-D format.

Up debuted at the 62nd Cannes Film Festival on May 13, 2009, and was released in the United States on May 29. It received critical acclaim for its screenplay, animation, characters, themes, narrative, emotional depth, humor, Asner's performance, Giacchino's musical score and its opening montage. The National Board of Review and the American Film Institute named Up one of the top-ten films of 2009. Up grossed $735 million worldwide, finishing its theatrical run as the sixth-highest-grossing film of 2009. It was nominated for five awards at the 82nd Academy Awards, winning two, and received numerous other accolades. Among its Academy Award nominations, it became the second of three animated films ever to receive a nomination for the Academy Award for Best Picture (after 1991's Beauty and the Beast and before 2010's Toy Story 3). Since then, it has been and continues to be regarded as one of the greatest animated films of the 21st century and of all time. A short-form sequel series, Dug Days, premiered on Disney+ on September 1, 2021.

== Plot ==
Eight-year-old Carl Fredricksen idolizes famed explorer Charles Muntz, who is discredited when a giant bird skeleton he brought back from Paradise Falls in Venezuela is deemed fake. Muntz travels back to the falls, vowing not to return until he brings back a live specimen.

Carl befriends Ellie, another young Muntz fan, who keeps a scrapbook of her adventures and dreams of moving her "clubhouse" (an abandoned house) to Paradise Falls and having adventures of her own. Carl and Ellie eventually marry, renovate the clubhouse and move in, working at the city zoo as a balloon salesman and zookeeper, respectively. Ellie suffers a miscarriage, and they learn they cannot have children. The couple saves money for a trip to Paradise Falls, but are repeatedly forced to spend their savings on more pressing needs. Many years later, a now elderly Carl decides to surprise Ellie with tickets to Venezuela, but she falls ill and is hospitalized, giving Carl her scrapbook before she dies.

Now in his late 70s, Carl holds out while the neighborhood around him is redeveloped. After unintentionally injuring a construction worker who accidentally damaged his mailbox, Carl is ordered by a court to move into an assisted living facility. However, Carl resolves to keep his promise to Ellie to move their house to Paradise Falls and attaches numerous balloons to it in order to fly there. Russell, a young "Wilderness Explorer" scout attempting to earn his final merit badge for assisting the elderly, becomes an accidental stowaway. Before Carl can land and send Russell home, a storm propels the house all the way to a tepui in Venezuela.

Carl and Russell harness themselves to the still-buoyant house and tow it across the mesa. Along the way, they encounter a giant flightless bird that Russell names Kevin (though the bird is later revealed to be female) and Dug, a Golden Retriever whose collar has a device that translates his thoughts into human speech. After failed attempts to evade the animals, Carl reluctantly allows both to join the party.

Dug's pack, all wearing collar translators, surrounds them. The dogs' master is revealed to be an elderly Charles Muntz, who invites Carl and Russell aboard his airship and discusses his quest to capture the bird. However, Carl's initial excitement over meeting him fades as he realizes that Muntz's obsession has driven him insane. After Muntz shows them the bird skeleton, Russell notes its resemblance to Kevin. Becoming hostile, Muntz reveals that he has murdered other travelers he suspected of also seeking the bird. Carl, Russell and Dug flee, pursued by Muntz's dogs; they are rescued by Kevin, who gets injured in the process.

Hearing Kevin call out to her chicks, Carl agrees to take her home. However, Muntz captures her and starts a fire beneath Carl's home. Forced to choose, Carl saves his home, allowing Muntz to take Kevin away and losing Russell's respect. Disheartened, Carl looks through his wife's scrapbook and discovers that she had filled in blank pages with photos of their life together and written "Thanks for the adventure – now go have a new one!". Reinvigorated, he goes outside, only to see Russell flying after Kevin using balloons and a leaf blower. Carl lightens his house by emptying it completely, enabling it to fly again.

Russell arrives at Muntz's airship but is caught. Carl and Dug, the latter of whom stowed away, board the dirigible and free him and Kevin. Muntz pursues them and traps Russell, Kevin, and Dug inside the house, but Carl saves them just as the tether breaks. Muntz leaps after them, but gets his leg tangled in balloon strings and falls to his death. Carl's house, having lost several balloons, descends out of sight beneath the clouds.

Carl, Dug, and Russell reunite Kevin with her chicks before returning home to the United States in Muntz's airship. Russell receives his badge for assisting the elderly, and Carl presents Russell with a bottle cap Ellie gave Carl when they first met as kids years ago, which he dubs "The Ellie Badge". Meanwhile, unbeknownst to Carl, the tepui his house landed on overlooks Paradise Falls, fulfilling his promise to Ellie.

== Voice cast ==
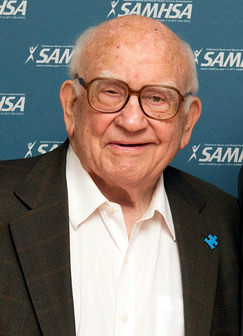
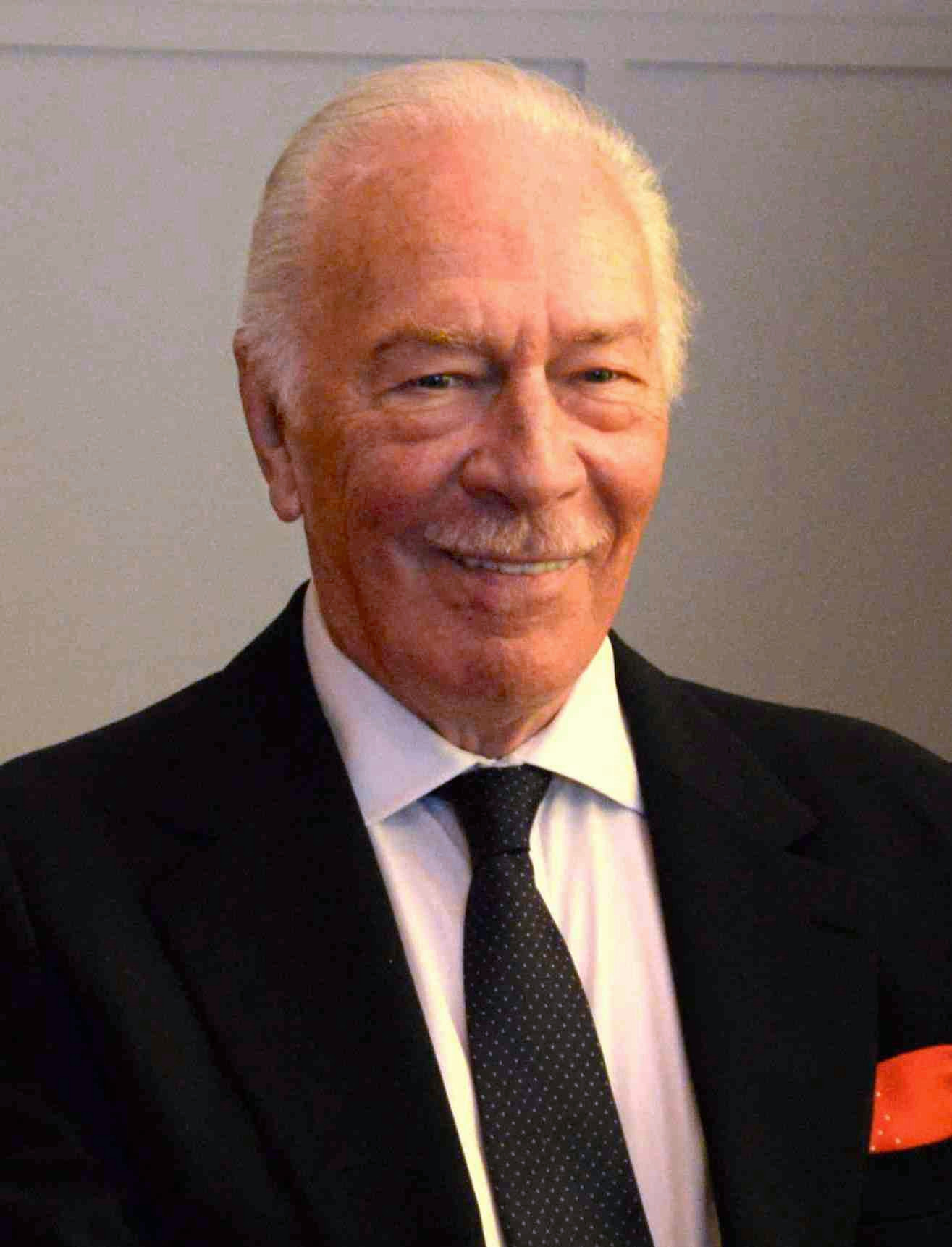
Ed Asner (left) in 2015 and Christopher Plummer in 2014
- Ed Asner as Carl Fredricksen, an elderly widower and retired balloon salesman. Docter and Rivera noted Asner's television alter ego, Lou Grant, had been helpful in writing for Carl because it guided them in balancing likable and unlikable aspects of the curmudgeonly character. The appearance of Carl was designed to resemble Spencer Tracy as he appeared in his final film, Guess Who's Coming to Dinner. When they met Asner and presented him with a model of his character, he joked, "I don't look anything like that." They tailored his dialogue for him, with short sentences and more consonants, which "cemented the notion that Carl, post-Ellie, is a disgruntled bear that's been poked awake during hibernation".
- Jordan Nagai as Russell, a young "Wilderness Explorer". Throughout most of the film, he makes several comments to Carl that suggest that Russell's father and mother are divorced.
- Christopher Plummer as Charles Muntz, an elderly explorer and Carl's childhood idol. The name of his airship, the Spirit of Adventure, may have been inspired by Charles Lindbergh's airplane, Spirit of St. Louis. In various interviews, Pete Docter mentioned Howard Hughes and real-life adventurers Lindbergh and Percy Fawcett as inspirations for Muntz. Reviewers noted his resemblance to Kirk Douglas.
- Bob Peterson as Dug, a talking Golden Retriever. Peterson knew he would voice Dug when he wrote his line "I have just met you, and I love you", which was based on what a child told him when he was a camp counselor in the 1980s. The DVD release of the film features a short called Dug's Special Mission, which follows Dug just before his first meeting with Carl and Russell. Dug previously appeared in Ratatouille as a shadow on a wall that barks at Remy.

Additionally, Delroy Lindo, Jerome Ranft, and Peterson voiced Muntz's dogs Beta, Gamma, and Alpha, respectively. John Ratzenberger played construction foreman Tom, and David Kaye the newsreel announcer. Pete Docter's daughter Elie and Jeremy Leary voiced younger versions of Ellie and Carl, respectively. Other cast members include Mickie T. McGowan as police officer Edith, Danny Mann as construction worker Steve, Donald Fullilove (credited as "Don") and Jess Harnell as Shady Oaks nurses George and A.J., Josh Cooley as Muntz's dog Omega, and Docter himself, credited as camp master Strauch and uncredited as Kevin.

== Production ==
=== Development ===
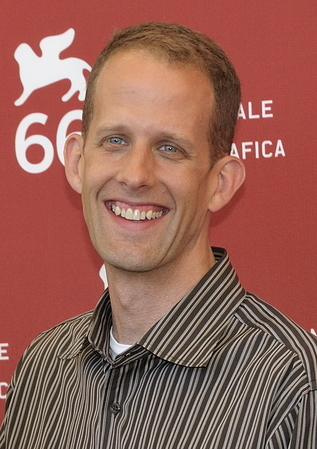
Director Pete Docter in 2009

Originally titled Heliums, Up was conceived in 2004 by director Pete Docter. He developed the fantasy of a flying house based on the idea of escaping from life when it becomes too irritating, which stemmed from his difficulty with social situations growing up. When Bob Peterson left the project for three months to co-direct Ratatouille, actor and writer Tom McCarthy stepped in to work with Docter on the story for Up. It was McCarthy who came up with the character Russell. Docter selected an old man for the main character after drawing a picture of a grumpy old man with smiling balloons. In addition, Docter and McCarthy wanted the protagonist to be an elderly man because they felt the worldview of someone Carl's age would be a rich source of humor. Despite Up being ostensibly a children's movie, Docter was not concerned about featuring an elderly protagonist, stating that children would relate to Carl the way they relate to their grandparents.

Early concepts differed from the final film. The initial version featured a floating city on an alien planet populated with muppet-like creatures, with two brothers vying to inherit their father's kingdom, and when the brothers fell to Earth, they encountered a tall bird who helped them understand each other. Unable to make this version of the story work, Docter and Peterson realized that the most intriguing element was the isolation of the floating city. So the whole city was stripped down to a single flying house with just a single occupant, where balloons replaced the magic which kept the floating city up. After that they got the idea to use an old person, and found the contrast between the elderly grumpy man and the cheerful, colorful balloons in Docter's drawing appealing. With Carl and Russell as the main characters, Docter and Peterson imagined the house landing on a Soviet-era spy airship camouflaged as a giant cloud, rather than on a tepui, but according to Docter, this concept was rewritten due to its similarity to another idea Pixar was developing at the time. Another idea Docter added, and then removed, was magic fountain-of-youth eggs laid by the bird, in order to explain the age discrepancy between Muntz and Carl, but they decided this subplot was too distracting, and people would forgive the minor inconsistency. Also, the biggest single influence on Up early on was The Station Agent, by Tom McCarthy.

Docter noted the film reflects his friendships with Disney veterans Frank Thomas, Ollie Johnston, and Joe Grant (who all died before the film's release and thus the film was dedicated to them). Grant gave the script his approval as well as some advice before his death in 2005. Docter recalled that Grant would remind him the audience needed an "emotional bedrock" because of how wacky the adventure would become; this "bedrock" would become Carl's mourning for his wife. Docter felt Grant's personality influenced Carl's deceased wife Ellie more than the grouchy main character. Carl was primarily based on Spencer Tracy, Walter Matthau, and James Whitmore, as well as the grandparents of Docter and his team, because there was "something sweet about [those] grumpy old guys". Docter and Jonas Rivera noted that Carl's charming nature in spite of his grumpiness derives from the elderly "hav[ing] this charm and almost this 'old man license' to say things that other people couldn't get away with ... It's like how we would go to eat with Joe Grant and he would call the waitresses 'honey'. I wish I could call a waitress 'honey'."

Docter revealed the filmmakers' first story outline had Carl "just want[ing] to join his wife up in the sky. It was almost a kind of strange suicide mission or something. And obviously that's [a problem]. Once he gets airborne, then what? So we had to have some goal for him to achieve." As a result, they added the plot of going to South America. The location was chosen both because of Docter's love of tropical locations, and because he wanted a location remote enough that Carl would be stuck with Russell, without social authorities (e.g., a police officer or social worker) able to intervene. Docter and Peterson decided that a child character would be the most effective way to help Carl stop being "stuck in his ways".

Dug was created by Docter and Peterson for a different project that never materialized. Docter felt it would be refreshing to show what a dog thinks, rather than what people assume it thinks. Docter and the film's artists and animators consulted with Dr. Ian Dunbar, a veterinarian, dog behaviorist, and trainer, to better understand canine communication, body language and pack behaviors. The idea for Alpha's voice derived from thinking about what would happen if someone broke a record player and it always played at a high pitch. Because Dug and Kevin were added to the story at an earlier stage than Russell, Docter and Peterson invented the talking dog collars to give Carl someone to talk with in the absence of other human companions. Russell, as well as that of the construction workers, helped make the story feel less "episodic".

Docter auditioned 400 boys in a nationwide casting call for the part of Russell. Nagai, who is Japanese American, showed up to an audition with his brother, who was actually the one auditioning. Docter realized Nagai behaved and spoke non-stop like Russell and chose him for the part. Nagai was eight years old when cast. Docter encouraged Nagai to act physically as well as vocally when recording the role, lifting him upside down and tickling him for the scene where Russell encounters Kevin. East Asian Americans have positively noted Pixar's first casting of an East Asian lead character, in contrast to the common practice of casting non-East Asians in East Asian parts, particularly in the role of an "all-American" boy without any stereotypes typically seen with East Asian characters, such as martial arts.

Carl's relationship with Russell reflects how "he's not really ready for the whirlwind that a kid is, as few of us are". Docter added he saw Up as a "coming of age" tale and an "unfinished love story", with Carl still dealing with the loss of his wife. He cited inspiration from Casablanca and A Christmas Carol, which are both "resurrection" stories about men who lose something, and regain purpose during their journey. Docter and Rivera cited inspirations from the Muppets, Hayao Miyazaki, Dumbo, and Peter Pan. They also saw parallels to The Wizard of Oz and tried to make Up not feel too similar. There is a scene where Carl and Russell haul the floating house through the jungle. A Pixar employee compared the scene to Fitzcarraldo, and Docter watched that film and The Mission for further inspiration.

Charles Muntz comes from Howard Hughes and Errol Flynn. In the DVD extra "The Many Endings of Muntz", Docter and his team talked about their struggle to figure out the character's ultimate fate. They considered having him redeem himself or survive unrepentant, but eventually decided that, "as almost a representation of Carl's old self, Muntz has to die."

Overall, the budget was approximately $175 million.

=== Animation ===
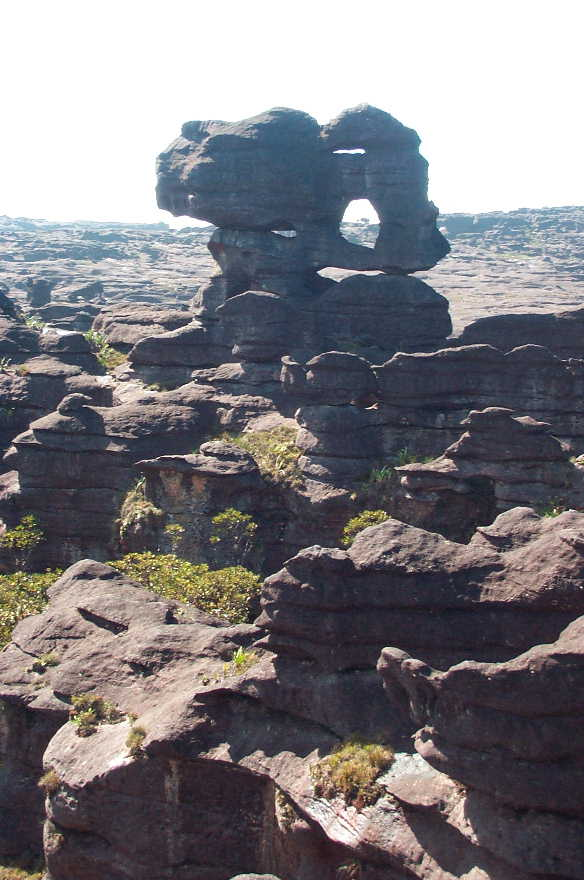
Docter and eleven other Pixar artists visited tepuis in Venezuela in 2004 for research.

Docter made Venezuela the film's setting after Ralph Eggleston gave him a video of the tepui mountains of Canaima National Park; tepuis were previously featured in another Disney film, Dinosaur. In 2004, Docter and eleven other Pixar artists spent three days reaching Monte Roraima by airplane, by jeep, and by helicopter. They also spent three nights there painting and sketching, and encountering ants, mosquitoes, scorpions, frogs, and snakes. They then flew to Matawi Tepui and climbed to Angel Falls. Docter felt "we couldn't use [the rocks and plants we saw]. Reality is so far out, if we put it in the movie you wouldn't believe it." The film's creatures were also challenging to design because they had to fit in the surreal environment of the tepuis, but also they had to be realistic because those mountains exist in real life. The filmmakers then visited the Sacramento Zoo to observe a Himalayan monal for Kevin's animation. The animators designed Russell as an Asian-American, and modeled Russell after similar looking Peter Sohn, a Pixar storyboard artist who is Korean-American. The Pixar employees frequently sketch each other during meetings, and a drawing of Sohn became the model for Russell.

While the studio usually designs their characters to be caricatured, Carl was even more so, being only at least three heads high. He was not given elderly features such as liver spots or hair in his ears to keep him appealing, yet giving him wrinkles, pockmarks on his nose, a hearing aid, and a cane to make him appear elderly. Docter wanted to push a stylized feel, particularly the way Carl's head is proportioned: he has a squarish appearance to symbolize his containment within his house, while Russell is rounded like a balloon. The challenge on Up was making these stylized characters feel natural, although Docter remarked the effect came across better than animating the realistic humans from Toy Story, who suffered from the "uncanny valley". Cartoonists Al Hirschfeld, Hank Ketcham, and George Booth influenced the human designs. Simulating realistic cloth on caricatured humans was harder than creating the 10,000 balloons flying the house. New programs were made to simulate the cloth and for Kevin's iridescent feathers. To animate old people, Pixar animators would study their own parents or grandparents and also watched footage of the Senior Olympics. The directors had various rules for Carl's movements: he could not turn his head more than 15–20 degrees without turning his torso as well, nor could he raise his arms high. However, they also wanted him to grow more flexible near the end of the film, transforming into an "action hero".

A technical director calculated that to make Carl's house fly, he would require 23 million balloons, but Docter realized that such a high number made the balloons look like small dots. Instead, the balloons created were made to be twice Carl's size. There are 10,297 balloons for shots of the house just flying, 20,622 balloons for the lift-off sequence, and a varying number in other scenes.

== Music ==
Up is the third Pixar film to be scored by Michael Giacchino, after The Incredibles and Ratatouille. What Pete Docter wanted most importantly out of the music was the emotion, so Giacchino wrote a character theme-based score that producer Jonas Rivera thought enhanced the story. At the beginning of the movie, when young Carl is in the movie theater watching a newsreel about Muntz, the first piece of music heard is "Muntz's Theme", which starts out as a celebratory theme, and echoes through the film when Muntz reappears 70 years later. "Ellie's Theme" is first heard when she is introduced as a little kid and plays several times during the film in different versions; for instance, during the sequence where Carl lifts his house with the balloons, the theme is changed from a simple piano melody to a full orchestral arrangement. Giacchino has compared the film to opera since each character has a unique theme that changes during a particular moment in the story.

The score was released as a digital download on May 26, 2009, three days before the film opened in theaters. It won the Academy Award for Best Original Score, the Grammy Award for Best Score Soundtrack Album, the Golden Globe Award for Best Original Score, and the 2010 BAFTA Award for Best Film Music. It is the first score for a Pixar film to win the Academy Award (Randy Newman also won for Monsters, Inc. and Toy Story 3, in the category of Best Original Song).

== Release ==
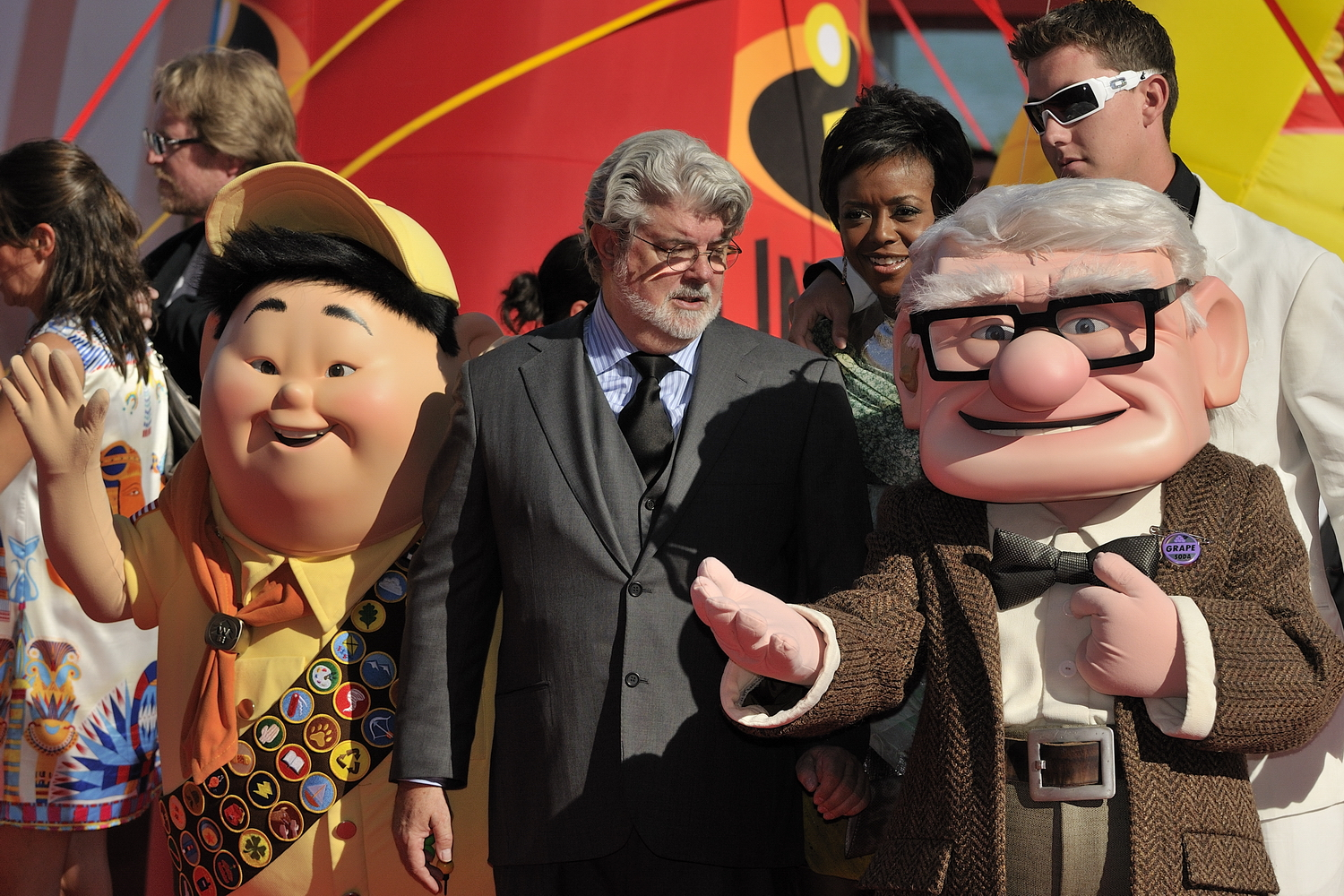
George Lucas with performers in Carl and Russell suits at the 66th Venice Film Festival

The 96-minute film Up opened the 62nd Cannes Film Festival on May 13, 2009, the first animated film to do so, followed by a premiere on May 16 at the El Capitan Theatre in Hollywood, Los Angeles. Up was initially scheduled for release on June 12, but was later moved up to May 29. The film was also released in 3D format, a first for a Pixar film. Despite Pixar's track record, Target Corporation and Walmart stocked few Up items, while its regular collaborator, Thinkway Toys, did not produce any merchandise, claiming the film's story was unusual and would be hard to promote. Disney acknowledged not every Pixar film would have to become a franchise. In Colombia, unexpected publicity for the film was generated due to the uncanny resemblance between Carl and Colombian ex-president Julio César Turbay Ayala. Docter intended for audiences to take a specific point from the film, saying:

Basically, the message of the film is that the real adventure of life is the relationship we have with other people, and it's so easy to lose sight of the things we have and the people that are around us until they are gone. More often than not, I don't really realize how lucky I was to have known someone until they're either moved or passed away. So, if you can kind of wake up a little bit and go, "Wow, I've got some really cool stuff around me every day", then that's what the movie's about.

Walt Disney Studios Home Entertainment released Up on Blu-ray and DVD on November 10, 2009. Physical copies contain two short films Partly Cloudy and Dug's Special Mission, audio commentary, a documentary Adventure is Out There, an unseen and alternate take The Many Endings of Muntz, and a digital copy. Blu-ray bonus features exclusively include a Cine-Explore, Global Guardian Badge and Geography games, and eight documentaries. On iTunes, it was later accompanied by a short film as an extra, George and A.J., which was also released on YouTube. In 2020, Up was released on 4K Ultra HD Blu-ray.

== Reception ==
=== Box office ===
Up earned $293 million in the United States and Canada and $442 million in other countries, for a worldwide total of $735 million. It was the sixth-highest-grossing film of 2009.

In the United States and Canada, exit polling showed extensive family attraction across a variety of audiences; 53% were female and 57% were under 17. The film was released with Drag Me to Hell on May 29, 2009. Up earned $21.4 million on its first day. The film debuted earning $68.2 million from 3,766 theaters (1,530 in 3D). It would hold the record for having the highest opening weekend for a 3D film until it was surpassed by James Cameron's Avatar later that year. Its earnings dropped by 37 percent to $44.3 million the second weekend, and another 31% to $30.5 million the third weekend; this was the slowest decline for a Pixar animated film since Finding Nemo. Up completed its theatrical run in the United States and Canada on December 5, 2009.

=== Critical response ===
Up received critical acclaim. (Note: Attributed to multiple references:) On the review aggregator website Rotten Tomatoes, 98% of 291 critics' reviews are positive, with an average rating of 9.1/10. The website's consensus reads: "An exciting, funny, and poignant adventure, Up offers an impeccably crafted story told with wit and arranged with depth, as well as yet another visual Pixar treat." Metacritic (which uses a weighted average) assigned Up a score of 88 out of 100 based on 37 critics, indicating "universal acclaim". Audiences polled by CinemaScore gave the film a rare grade of "A+" on an A+ to F scale.

In a four-star (out of four) review, film critic Roger Ebert called it "a wonderful film", and "another masterwork from Pixar". The Hollywood Reporter lauded the film as "Winsome, touching and arguably the funniest Pixar effort ever, this gorgeously rendered, high-flying adventure is a tidy 90-minute distillation of all the signature touches that came before it." Although the San Francisco Chronicle noted that the film "contains many boring stretches of mindless freneticism and bland character interaction," it also declared that there are scenes in Up of "such beauty, economy and poetic wisdom that they belong in any anthology of great movie moments ... to watch Up with any attention is to be moved and astonished by the economy with which specific visuals are invested with emotion throughout [the film]." Variety enthused that "Up is an exceptionally refined picture; unlike so many animated films, it's not all about sensory bombardment and volume ... Unsurprisingly, no one puts a foot wrong here. Vocal performances ... exude a warm enthusiasm, and tech specifications could not be better. Michael Giacchino's full-bodied, traditional score is superlative". The Globe and Mail stated that Up is "the kind of movie that leaves you asking 'How do people come up with this stuff?'" along with an overall positive review of the film, despite it being predictable.

The character of Carl Fredricksen has received mostly positive reception. Bill Capodagli, author of Innovate the Pixar Way, praised Carl for his ability to be a jerk and likable at the same time. Wall Street Journal editor Joe Morgenstern described Carl as gruff, comparing him to Buster Keaton, but adds that this begins to wear thin as the movie progresses. He has been compared with Spencer Tracy, an influence on the character, by The Washington Post editor Ann Hornaday and Empire editor Ian Freer, who describes him as similar to a "Guess Who's Coming to Dinner-era" Tracy. Entertainment Weekly editor Lisa Schwarzbaum described his appearance as a cross between Tracy and an eccentric out of a George Booth cartoon. Time editor Richard Corliss also makes the comparison, calling him a "trash compacted version" of Tracy. He has also been compared to Walter Matthau, another inspiration for the character's design, by LA Weekly editor Scott Foundas, suggesting that actor Ed Asner was channeling him while performing the role of Carl. Variety editor Todd McCarthy described Carl as a combination of both Tracy and Matthau.

The relationship between Carl and his wife Ellie has been praised in several media outlets. In his book Disney, Pixar, and the Hidden Message of Children's Films, author M. Keith Booker described the love between Carl and Ellie as touching. While also describing the scene of the two of them aging as a "masterpiece of its own kind", he was not sure how much children would appreciate the scene, commenting that his son was squirming in his seat during the scene. Reelviews editor James Berardinelli praised their relationship, stating that it brought a tear to his eye in a way no animated film has done, including anything by famed anime director Hayao Miyazaki. Ann Hornaday praised the prologue, describing it as "worthy of Chaplin in its heartbreaking poignancy." Chicago Tribune editor Michael Phillips praised the scene, describing it as an emotional and cinematic powerhouse, and that he also was nearly moved to tears. However, Salon editor Stephanie Zacharek criticized the love between Carl and Ellie, describing their marriage as resembling a dental adhesive commercial more than a real relationship.

Asner was praised in several media outlets for his portrayal of Carl. San Francisco Chronicle editor Mick LaSalle praised Asner as a great choice due to having a grumpiness to his voice that is not truly grumpy, but rather coming from a protective stance. Entertainment Weekly editor Lisa Schwarzbaum praised Asner's acting, stating that he has a "Lou Grant authority" to his voice. Time editor Richard Corliss stated that Asner had the "gruffness and deadpan comic timing to bring Carl to life." The Boston Globe editor Ty Burr concurred with this, stating that his Lou Grant-like voice had not diminished with time. USA Today editor Claudia Puig praised Asner's delivery, describing it as superb.

The formulation of Russell as an Asian-American character, along with the casting of an Asian-American in the role was met positively as well. Both Nagai and the film were awarded by the East West Players for the depiction of Russell. EWP lauded Pixar for the creation of the character, stating, "We are proud to honor a very progressive film company like Pixar who cast an Asian-American character alongside an elderly one to play the leads in a feature film." The character is noted as Pixar's first lead Asian character, and was further positively received within the added context of historical non-Asian castings for Asian roles in entertainment. Asian-American organizations and entertainment websites, such as media watchdog Media Action Network for Asian Americans (MANAA), Racebending.com, and Angry Asian Man praised the character and Pixar for its diverse character depictions, noting the general lack of Asian-American lead characters and Asian actors cast in entertainment. In an interview with NPR in 2013, Angry Asian Man's Phil Yu reflected on the character's lack of typical Asian stereotyping, stating, "You know, he just happens to be Asian and he's, you know, really adorable character. But that kid could've been of any ethnicity but they made the effort to make him Asian—just a little color, you know, and it's really wonderful when that kind of thing happens where they don't have to play that up and make it like a thing or a joke, which happens a lot."

Up was included on a number of best-of lists. It appeared on professional rankings from Empire based on retrospective appraisal, as one of the greatest films of the twenty-first century. Several publications have listed it as one of the best animated films, including: Entertainment Weekly (2009), IGN (2010), Time (2011), Insider, USA Today (both 2018), Rolling Stone (2019), Esquire (2020), Parade, Time Out New York, and Empire (all 2021). In December 2021, the film's screenplay was listed number thirty-three on the Writers Guild of America's "101 Greatest Screenplays of the 21st Century (So Far)". The February 2020 issue of New York Magazine lists Up as among "The Best Movies That Lost Best Picture at the Oscars." In 2025, the film ranked number 50 on The New York Times' list of "The 100 Best Movies of the 21st Century" and number 85 on the "Readers' Choice" edition of the list.

=== Accolades ===
At the 82nd Academy Awards, Up received nominations for Best Picture, Best Original Screenplay, and Best Sound Editing and won Best Animated Feature and Best Original Score. Its other nominations include nine Annie Awards (winning two), four British Academy Film Awards (winning two), four Critics' Choice Awards (winning two), and two Golden Globe Awards (winning both). The National Board of Review and the American Film Institute named Up one of the ten-best films of 2009; it also won the National Board of Review's Best Animated Film award. It also won the inaugural American Cinema Editors Award for Best Edited Animated Feature Film.

== Other media ==
=== Short films ===
==== Dug's Special Mission (2009) ====
Dug's Special Mission is a short film released in 2009 as part of the Blu-ray/DVD releases of Up. The plot shows Dug's actions before his meeting with Carl and Russell.

==== George and A.J. (2009) ====
George and A.J. is a short film released in 2009 focused on the nurses George and A.J. after seeing Carl's house fly away and their reaction after it.

==== Carl's Date (2023) ====
Carl's Date is a short film released theatrically in 2023 along with Pixar's Elemental. Serving as the finale for the Dug Days series, the short focuses on Carl preparing for his first date since Ellie's death.

=== Video games ===
In 2009, an adventure video game, Up, was released for multiple platforms.

Kinect Rush: A Disney–Pixar Adventure (2012) features characters and worlds from five of Pixar's films, including Up.

In the world-building video game Disney Magic Kingdoms, Carl Fredricksen, Russell, Kevin, Dug, and Charles Muntz appear as playable characters to unlock for a limited time, along with attractions based on Carl's house and Paradise Falls, with the characters involved in new storylines that serve as a continuation of the events of the film.

=== Spin-off television series ===
A streaming microseries of short films following Up, Dug Days, was released on Disney+ on September 1, 2021. It is set some time after the events of the film and focuses on Dug and Carl as they reside in suburbia. The short film Carl's Date, released theatrically on June 16, 2023, acted as the sixth and final episode of Dug Days.

=== Theme parks ===
Russell and Dug appear at Disney California Adventure and Walt Disney World as meet-and-greet characters, with Kevin being a free-roaming character at Disney's Animal Kingdom, while Carl only appears on special occasions and events.

The Redwood Creek Challenge Trail play area at Disney's California Adventure is themed after the Wilderness Explorers scouting organization from the film.

On April 12, 2025, it was reported that a new ride based on Disney and Pixar's Up, which will be built in Adventure Way at Disney Adventure World at Disneyland Paris. On April 12, 2026, it was announced that the name of the attraction is Wilderness Explorers Sky Swings and it will be opening in 2027 at Disney Adventure World at Disneyland Paris.

== In popular culture ==
In the episode "Loan-a Lisa" from the television series The Simpsons, the opening sequence of the film is parodied in a short of The Itchy & Scratchy Show titled "P.U.", with Scratchy and his wife in the role of Carl and Ellie.

The fourth episode of the seventh season of the ABC fairytale drama Once Upon a Time, titled "Beauty" features a rendition of Up, with the characters of Rumplestiltskin and Belle taking the place of Carl and Ellie. It contains many references to the animated film, including the process of building of the house, the design of the house itself, the twin chairs, and the picnics as many years go by, culminating in Belle's collapse and death as Ellie did in the film.

== See also ==
- List of American films of 2009
- Cluster ballooning
- Lawnchair Larry flight
- The Red Balloon, a French short film
- The Flying House, a Japanese anime television series
- Edith Macefield, a real-estate holdout
- Thirsty Beaver, a real-estate holdout
- Vera Coking, a real-estate holdout
