= Danny Deckchair =

- Directed by: Jeff Balsmeyer
- Written by: Jeff Balsmeyer
- Produced by: Andrew Mason
- Starring: Rhys Ifans; Miranda Otto
- Cinematography: Martin McGrath
- Edited by: Suresh Ayyar
- Music by: David Donaldson; Steve Roche; Janet Roddick
- Production company: Macquarie Film Corporation
- Distributed by: 20th Century Fox (Australia); Lions Gate Films (United States)
- Release dates: 16 May 2003 (Cannes); 11 August 2004 (US)
- Running time: 100 minutes
- Country: Australia
- Language: English

Danny Deckchair is a 2003 Australian comedy film written and directed by Jeff Balsmeyer. The majority of the film was shot in Bellingen, a town on the Mid North Coast in New South Wales.

It was inspired by the story of the Lawnchair Larry flight.

== Plot ==
Danny Morgan (Rhys Ifans) works as a concrete truck driver and construction worker who lives in Sydney with his girlfriend but is unhappy with his life. Danny yearns for the simple life while girlfriend Trudy (Justine Clarke) fantasizes about bright lights and fast times. Danny plans for their annual camping trip, but Trudy tells him she has to work, so the trip is off. In reality, Trudy is using her work connections at a local real estate agency to set up a meeting with a handsome local reporter, Sandy Upman (Rhys Muldoon). Danny sees them together while he is shopping for a weekend barbecue, leaving him even more disenchanted with their relationship.

During the barbecue in his backyard, Danny, being an inventive character, ties a bunch of helium-filled balloons to his deckchair as his friends hold him down. When they inadvertently let go, Danny is set on an airborne adventure across Australia, which causes him to become a national sensation. As he floats over idyllically beautiful rural landscapes, totally foreign to the concrete structures of his discontent, he appears on the verge of some enlightenment. After he is beaten up in a rugged ride through a thunderstorm, fireworks from a small town's macadamia festival bursts most of his balloons and catches him on fire. Danny falls and crashes into a tree in Glenda's yard as the remnants of his chair float away.

Glenda (Miranda Otto) is watching the fireworks from her porch, when Danny falls to the ground. As firemen and townsfolk arrive to investigate the fireball, they see Glenda helping a disheveled Danny. To cover for him, Glenda tells them that Danny is a professor from her college days and takes him into her house, which belonged to her parents. As she attends to Danny's injuries, the lonely Glenda, fascinated by the strapping Danny, does not press him about his past. Danny does not help matters by offering only vague explanations about his origins and unorthodox arrival in the town of Clarence.

As Danny explores the town, Glenda's friends wonder about their past relationship, but they are quickly won over by Danny's whimsical ways. They are just happy to see that the withdrawn, and sometimes despised, traffic officer is with someone special. With his friendly, easy-going manner, Danny persuades Glenda to dress up and go with him to the harvest ball. She gives him some nice clothes (formerly her father's) to wear to the ball. As Danny looks in the mirror and sees himself in a new light, he shaves off his beard and trims his scraggly hair. At the ball and around town, Danny's mysterious past, detached demeanour and off-the-wall ideas make him an instant hit with the townsfolk. His ideas that were considered hair-brained in the big city seem fresh in the small town of Clarence, and "the professor" is hired to become the manager of an aspiring politician's campaign. As they spend time together at Glenda's house, Danny finds her father's old motorcycle, which for sentimental reasons Glenda keeps in the shed. After she shows Danny pictures of her parents on the motorcycle exploring the country, Danny fixes up the motorcycle while Glenda is at work.

All the while, the big city media cannot get enough coverage of Danny's disappearance and the search for him, constantly broadcasting interviews of his friends, family and co-workers. Trudy revels in her new-found celebrity and takes up with Sandy, the reporter, who sees covering Danny's story and Trudy's suffering as a way to the top.

Back in Clarence, Danny is forging a deep connection with Glenda. But their budding relationship is not viewed by everyone in town as all peaches-and-cream. Their flirtations arouse jealousy and suspicion in Glenda's supervisor, the town's police chief. While Glenda is doing her rounds, Danny surprises her by showing up with the working motorcycle and takes her for a wild ride. The police chief busts them for speeding, but nothing fazes Danny as he continues to immerse himself in his ideal world. He even goes so far as to give a stirring speech at a political rally, and he is asked by some of the townsfolk to run for office.

All caught up in the dizzying events surrounding the political rally, Glenda and Danny spend the night together. He wakes reveling in his new soul-mate, gets dressed in a haze of happiness and steps outside onto Glenda's porch to greet the dawn of his perfect new life. However, local kids have found and reported the deck chair causing Danny's past to come crashing down upon him in a torrent of media frenzy.

As a shocked Glenda emerges from her house to see what all the noise is about, she spots Danny running down the street with a crowd in hot pursuit. Just then, Trudy and Upman drop down in a news helicopter and land in the street in front of Glenda's yard, stopping Danny dead in his tracks. Trudy reclaims Danny amidst an explosion of camera flashes to take him back to Sydney, where she can bask in this new-found fame. She drags Danny into the helicopter and whisks him away with Danny's anguished face pressed against the window peering at Glenda.

As his half-truths are uncovered in the stark light of media exposure, Glenda rails against Danny as he leaves. Although she is angry at being deceived by Danny, his departure brings Glenda to the stark realization that she has been deceiving herself as well. She finally admits to herself that her life is miserable and resigns from her dead-end traffic officer job.

Meanwhile, unhappily plugged back into his old job and with Trudy trying to capitalize on his fame, the deep changes that Clarence made in Danny make city life all the more unbearable. Deeply miserable and stuck in a traffic jam with his cement truck, Danny abruptly ditches it and his job to walk home, He then confronts Trudy telling her that they are over and uses the connections his media storm has forged to get on a military plane to return to Clarence and win Glenda back.

Back in Clarence, Glenda has finished packing up her motorcycle and is saying goodbye to her friends. Just then, Danny parachutes out of the plane over Clarence and crash-lands again in the tree in front of Glenda's house as she is starting to leave on her motorcycle. At first, Glenda appears excited to see Danny; but immediately she starts yelling that he cannot just drop in and everything will be all right. Glenda resolutely drives off before Danny can convince her how much he needs her and his new life in the town of Clarence. Dragging his parachute, Danny runs after her, shouting that he'll do whatever it takes to get back together. As she drives away, Danny's parachute cord gets caught on the back of the motorcycle and he is lifted into the air. Glenda glances into her mirror and notices Danny flying behind her and stops the bike. As he comes down, Danny and Glenda get entangled in the parachute, embrace and kiss.

As the movie ends, Danny and Glenda, in their bathrobes, symbolically float upward in deck chairs as they talk about their future plans.

== Cast ==
- Rhys Ifans as Danny Morgan
- Miranda Otto as Glenda Lake
- Justine Clarke as Trudy Dunphy
- Rhys Muldoon as Sandy Upman
- John Batchelor as Pete
- Gyton Grantley as Stuey

== Awards and nominations ==
- Film Critics Circle of Australia Awards – 2003 Best Supporting Actor (Justine Clarke)
- Paris Film Festival – Grand Prix 2004 (Jeff Balsmeyer)

== Box office ==
Danny Deckchair grossed $1,050,383 at the box office in Australia.

== See also ==
- Cinema of Australia
- Cluster ballooning
- Doc Hollywood
- Up
