= Automatic activation device =

Device that automatically opens a parachute

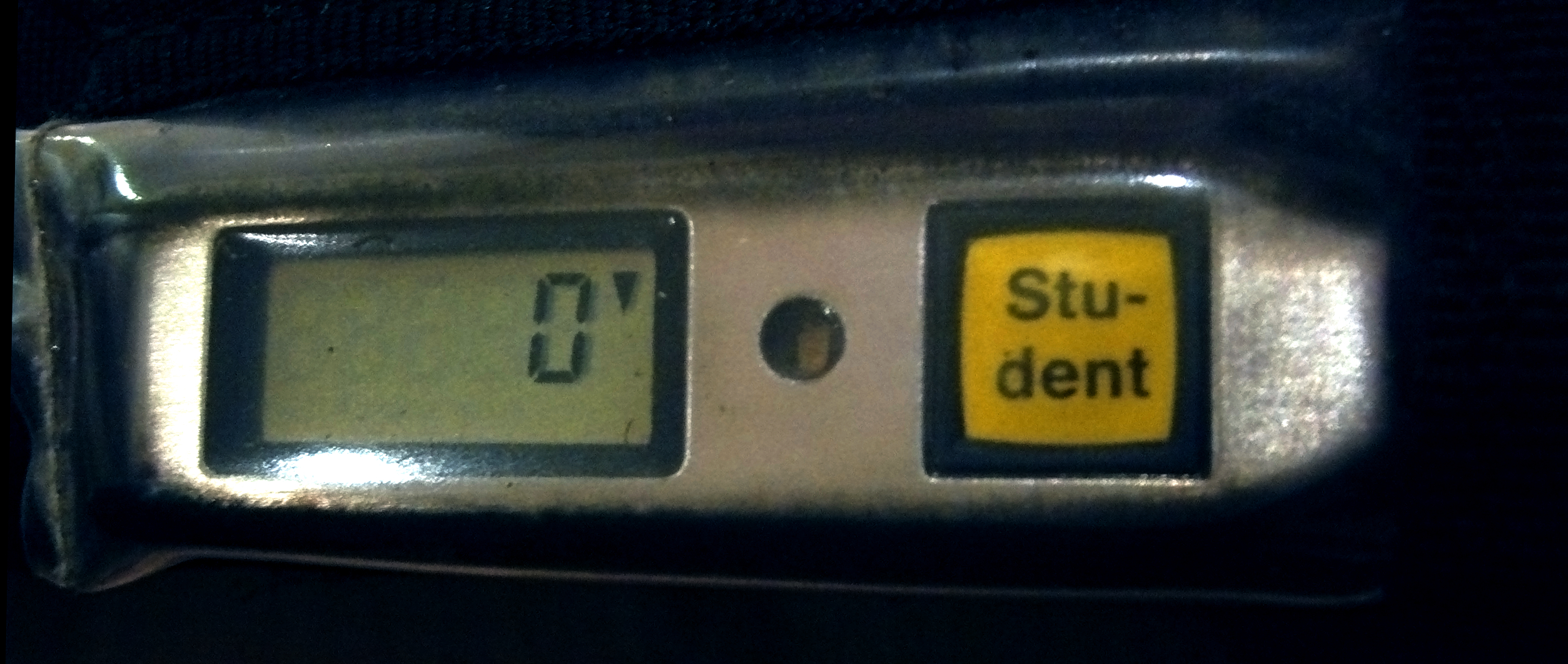
CYPRES II panel

In skydiving, an automatic activation device (AAD) is a dead man's switch consisting of an electronic-pyrotechnic or mechanical device that automatically activates the opening sequence of the main or reserve parachute container when the AAD is falling below a preset altitude and above a preset descent speed.

AADs are typically used to open the reserve parachute container at a preset altitude if the descent rate exceeds a preset activation speed. This indicates that the user has not opened their parachute, or that the parachute is malfunctioning and is not slowing the descent rate sufficiently.

The older style mechanical AADs are falling out of fashion in favour of newer style electronic-pyrotechnic models, and even rigs that support mechanical AADs often require modification (e.g. Vector SE student rig). These newer models have been proven more reliable as their built-in computers allow for better estimation of altitude and vertical speed. Electronic AADs typically employ a small pyrotechnic charge to sever the reserve container closing loop, allowing the spring-loaded reserve pilot chute to deploy. Mechanical AADs typically use a spring-loaded mechanism to pull the reserve (or main) closing pin.

== Examples ==
Examples of specific AADs are:

Manufacturer	Models	Technology
Advanced Aerospace Designs	Vigil, Vigil 2	Electronic
Airtec	CYPRES, CYPRES 2	Electronic
Aviacom	Argus	Electronic
FXC	Astra	Electronic
MarS	MPAAD, M2	Electronic
FXC	Model 12000	Mechanical
Hi Tek	Model 8000	Mechanical
SSE	Sentinel	Mechanical
2MPZ	KAP-3	Mechanical

== Safety ==
AADs can malfunction and deploy the reserve parachute when the firing parameters have not been met. This will result in either a premature reserve deployment if it happens prior to main deployment, or in both parachutes being deployed if it happens after main deployment. A premature reserve deployment can be dangerous if it happens while exiting the aircraft, in close proximity to other skydivers in freefall, or if the skydiver is falling faster than the safe deployment speed, which can result in catastrophic equipment failure and injury or even death of the jumper. A deployment of both canopies could result in an entanglement between the two canopies.

Undesired AAD activations can also occur due to user error. This can happen if the skydiver deploys the main canopy too low, and the AAD activates while the main is deploying, resulting in both parachutes being deployed. It can also happen if the AAD is not calibrated to the correct ground level, either due to turning the AAD on at a location with a different elevation than the airport, or entering an incorrect altitude offset (a feature that is normally used to compensate for a landing zone that is at a different elevation than the airport). Some high-performance canopy landings can reach speeds of 60-90 mph, which can trigger some AADs and potentially result in a fatality.

Specialized variations of AAD models, or multi-mode AADs, are produced for scenarios that require different thresholds. For example, "Speed" AADs have a higher speed threshold (~100 mph) to prevent inadvertent activation when jumpers perform swoop landings with high-performance canopies. Conversely, "Student" and "Wingsuit" AADs have a lower speed threshold (29-45 mph), and student AADs trigger at a higher altitude (typically 1200 ft). Other specialized variants include "tandem" AADs that activate at 1900 ft, and timer-based AADs for cargo drops.

Some models of AAD carry a risk of deploying the reserve inside the aircraft in cases of sudden aircraft depressurization, or during a rapid descent when landing with the aircraft. It is often recommended to turn off AADs before landing with the aircraft, especially models with lower speed thresholds.

The risk of an AAD malfunction is far smaller than the risk of a situation in which the AAD can save somebody's life. For this reason, many countries (such as Denmark) require AADs for all skydivers and jumps. In countries where AADs are not legally mandated (such as the US), many drop zones still require all jumpers to use AADs. Others require all student jumpers to use them even if licensed jumpers are not.

AADs were originally called AODs for Automatic Opening Device, but was changed to Automatic Activation Device, AAD, in the 1980's to reflect the true nature of its operation. The AAD activates the opening sequence, but other very uncommon events could prevent the activation sequence from fully opening the parachute.

== HADOPAD radar actuator ==
High-Altitude Delayed-Opening Parachute Actuating Device, also called HADOPAD, was a radar actuator used as a component in a delayed opening aerial-delivery system. The system was developed by the Harry Diamond Laboratories in the mid-1960s, which later became a part of Army Research Laboratory. The device, based on radar principles, opened a main recovery parachute at either of two preset heights (1,000 or 1,700 ft.) above the ground. The air delivery system consisted of the cargo package, two parachutes (drogue and main), and the radar actuator. The radar was designed to determine when the cargo reached a preset altitude, generating a firing signal which actuated a mechanism releasing the main parachute at that time.

== See also ==
- Adrian Nicholas – a noted skydiver who died from an AAD activation (by reaching the speeds required to activate his AAD under a high performance canopy)
