= Ampére =

- Municipality
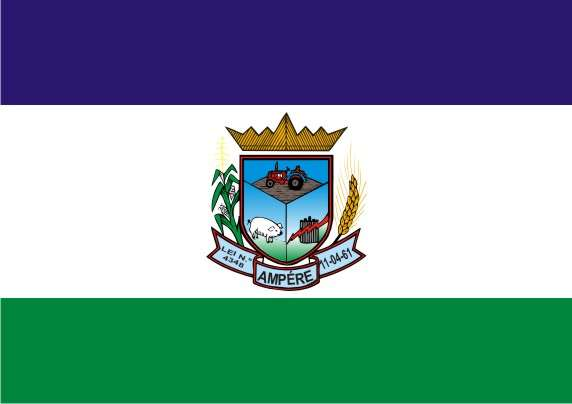
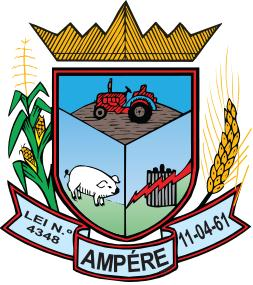
- Flag Coat of arms

- Location in Brazil
- Coordinates: 25°54′54″S 53°28′22″W
- Country: Brazil
- Region: Southern
- State: Paraná
- Mesoregion: Sudoeste Paranaense

Population (2020)
  - Total: 19,311
- Time zone: UTC−3 (BRT)

Ampére is a municipality in the state of Paraná in the Southern Region of Brazil.

Ampére is located in the southern part of the state of Paraná, about a three-hour drive from the city of Foz do Iguaçu, and approximately 40 kilometers from the border with Argentina.

The city of Ampére was officially established in 1961, making it a relatively recent formation. Its establishment is linked to the colonization of southern Paraná by Brazilian settlers.

The origin of the city's name is undoubtedly connected to the eponymous river that flows through it, as is the case with many other small towns in Paraná. The Ampére River, a tributary of the Capanema River, was originally named "Ampère" (with the grave accent, which does not exist in Portuguese) in honor of André-Marie Ampère, as evidenced by maps created at the end of the 19th century during the cartography of this region of Brazil.

The Society of Friends of André-Marie Ampère (SAAMA) named the city of Ampére an honorary member of the SAAMA during its Board of Directors meeting on February 1, 2023.

== See also ==
- List of municipalities in Paraná
