= Ed Asner filmography =

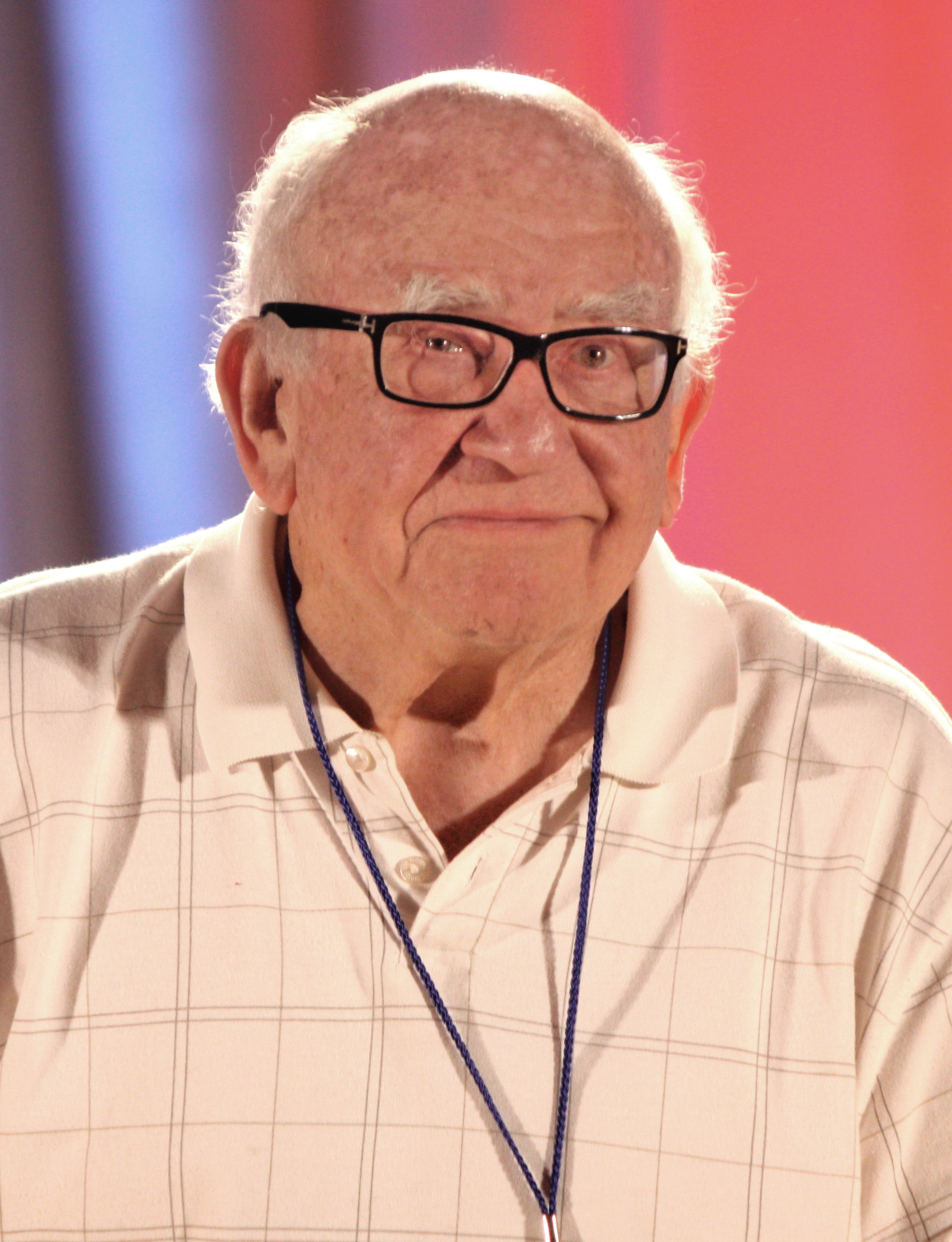
Asner at the 2012 Phoenix Comicon

The following is the incomplete filmography of the American actor Ed Asner.

== Film ==
Year	Title	Role	Notes
1961	The Murder Men	Dave Keller	Stock footage
1962	Kid Galahad	Assistant District Attorney Frank Gerson	Uncredited
1965	The Satan Bug	Veretti	
1965	The Slender Thread	Detective Judd Ridley	
1966	The Venetian Affair	Frank Rosenfeld	
1967	El Dorado	Bart Jason	
1967	Gunn	Lieutenant Charles Jacoby	
1969	Change of Habit	Lieutenant Moretti	
1970	Halls of Anger	Ernie McKay	
1970	They Call Me Mister Tibbs!	Woody Garfield	
1971	Skin Game	Plunkett	
1971	The Todd Killings	Fred Reardon	
1974	The Wrestler	Frank Bass	
1976	Gus	Hank Cooper	
1981	Fort Apache, The Bronx	Captain Dennis Connolly	
1982	O'Hara's Wife	Bob O'Hara	
1983	Daniel	Jacob Ascher	
1984	Anatomy of an Illness	Norman Cousins	
1986	The Christmas Star	Horace McNickle	
1987	Pinocchio and the Emperor of the Night	Sylvester J. Scalawag	Voice
1988	Moon over Parador	Himself	
1989	Happily Ever After	Scowl	Voice
1991	JFK	Guy Banister	
1992	The Real Story of Happy Birthday to You	Charlie	Voice, short film
1995	Gargoyles the Movie: The Heroes Awaken	Hudson	Voice, direct-to-video
1995	Goldilocks and the Three Bears	Bruno	
1997	The Fanatics	Charlie Atwater	
1997	A Christmas Carol	Jacob Marley	Voice, direct-to-video
1998	Hard Rain	Uncle Charlie	
1999	Love and Action in Chicago	Taylor	
1999	The Bachelor	Sid Gluckman	
1999	Our Friend, Martin	Mr. Harris	Voice, direct-to-video
2000	Perfect Game	Coach Billy	
2001	The Animal	Chief Marion Wilson	
2003	Elf	Santa Claus	Credited as Edward Asner
2005	Out of the Woods	Jack Green	
2005	Sheeba	Grandpa Cecil	
2006	The Heart Specialist	Mr. Olson	
2007	Christmas Is Here Again	Krad	Voice
2008	Channels	Ed Packard	
2008	Gigantic	Kirby Weathersby	
2008	Christmas Cottage	Sidney	
2009	Up	Carl Fredricksen	Voice
2009	Dug's Special Mission	Carl Fredricksen	Voice, short; uncredited
2010	The Triumph of William Henry Harrison	Narrator	Voice
2010	Not Another B Movie	Angry Investor	
2010	Superman/Batman: Apocalypse	Granny Goodness	Voice, direct-to-video
2011	All-Star Superman	Perry White	Voice, direct-to-video
2011	Witness Insecurity	Maxwell	
2011	Let Go	Artie Satz	
2011	Identical	Yaakov Washington	
2012	Foodfight!	Mr. Leonard	Voice
2012	Should've Been Romeo	Charlie	
2012	Elephant Sighs	Leo	
2013	Axel: The Biggest Little Hero	Bonta / Narrator	Voice
2013	I Know That Voice	Himself	
2014	Audrey	Walt	
2014	The Games Maker	Nicholas Drago	
2015	I Thought I Told You to Shut Up!!	Himself	Short film
2015	The Nutcracker Sweet	Owl	Voice
2016	Miracle in the Valley	Judge Mordecai Price	
2017	Joe's War	Harry	Direct-to-video
2017	CarGo	Art	Voice
2017	In Vino	Charles	
2017	The Flood	Mick	Short
2017	Yamasong: March of the Hollows	Elder Pyreez	
2017	Within Reach	Ed	Short
2017	The Gliksmans	Moshe	
2017	Saving Christmas	Rick	Direct-to-video
2017	Santa Stole Our Dog: A Merry Doggone Christmas!	Santa Claus	
2018	Still Waiting in the Wings	Jefferson	
2018	The Parting Glass	Tommy	
2018	When We Are Right	Michael	Voice, short
2018	Angels on Tap	Swifty	
2018	Barking Mad	Manfred Schiel	
2018	Honor Amongst Men	Pop Halmo	
2018	The Wedding	Vern	
2019	The Garden Left Behind	Dr. Cleary	
2019	Faith, Hope & Love	Harry Karetas	
2020	M.O.M.: Mothers of Monsters	Dr. Harry Arden	
2020	Rain Beau's End	Gunny	
2020	Tiger Within	Samuel	
2021	Senior Entourage	Ed	
2021	Back Home Again	Peter Lionsbridge (voice)	Short film; posthumous release
2022	Diary of a Wimpy Kid: Rodrick Rules	Grandpa Heffley (voice)	Posthumous release; dedicated to his memory
2023	Confessions of a Union Buster: A Call to Action	Himself	Short film; posthumous release
2023	Deadly Draw	Max Perlmutter	Posthumous release; filmed in 2021
2023	Carl's Date	Carl Fredricksen (voice)	Theatrical short; posthumous release, dedicated to his memory
2024	Altered Reality	Mike Wilson	Posthumous release; filmed in 2020
2024	A Fargo Christmas Story	Popcorn Bud	Posthumous release; filmed in 2020
2025	The Gettysburg Address	Edward Everett (voice)	Posthumous release
2029	Unplugged	Dr. Eaton (voice)	Posthumous release, final film role

== Television ==
Year	Title	Role	Notes
1957	Studio One	Multiple roles	Season 9 Episode 20: "The Defender: Part 1" (uncredited) Season 9 Episode 21: "The Defender: Part 2" (uncredited) Season 10 Episode 2: "The Night America Trembled"
1958	Decoy	Sergeant	Season 1 Episode 18: "An Eye for an Eye"
1960–1962	Route 66	Multiple roles	Season 1 Episode 4: "The Man on the Monkey Board" Season 1 Episode 28: "The Opponent" Season 2 Episode 7: "The Mud Nest" Season 2 Episode 21: "Shoulder the Sky, My Lad" Season 3 Episode 8: "Welcome to the Wedding"
1961	Naked City	Lieutenant Vincent Busti	Season 2 Episode 13: "A Hole in the City" Season 2 Episode 23: "New York to L.A."
1961	Target: The Corruptors!	Tyler	Season 1 Episode 9: "The Golden Carpet"
1962	Outlaws	Keef	Season 2 Episode 13: "The Dark Sunrise of Griff Kincaid"
1962	Cain's Hundred	Dave Keller	Season 1 Episode 21: "Blues for a Junkman: Arthur Troy"
1962	Alfred Hitchcock Presents	Warden Bragan	Season 7 Episode 30: "What Frightened You, Fred?"
1962	Sam Benedict	Dr. Everett Colner	Season 1 Episode 4: "Nothing Equals Nothing"
1962	Alcoa Premiere	Daniel Stryker	Season 2 Episode 10: "The Contenders"
1962–1963	Dr. Kildare	Multiple roles	Season 2 Episode 11: "The Legacy" Season 2 Episode 28: "Tightrope Into Nowhere"
1962–1963	The Untouchables	Multiple roles	Season 3 Episode 16: "The Death Tree" Season 4 Episode 1: "The Night They Shot Santa Claus" Season 4 Episode 8: "Elegy" Season 4 Episode 13: "Search for a Dead Man"
1963	The Eleventh Hour	Max Brenson	Season 1 Episode 15: "My Name is Judith, I'm Lost, You See"
1963	The Alfred Hitchcock Hour	Jack Stander	Season 1 Episode 19: "To Catch a Butterfly"
1963	The Virginian	George Johnson	Season 1 Episode 26: "Echo of Another Day"
1963	Stoney Burke	Kapp	Season 1 Episode 30: "Tigress by the Tail"
1963	The Nurses	Phil Granger	Season 2 Episode 4: "The Gift"
1963	Ben Casey	Jerome Lynch	Season 3 Episode 7: "The Echo of a Silent Cheer: Part 2"
1963	The Lieutenant	Charles Perry	Season 1 Episode 10: "A Troubled Image"
1963	The Outer Limits	Detective Sergeant Thomas Siroleo	Season 1 Episode 11: "It Crawled Out of the Woodwork"
1963	The Richard Boone Show	Harry Forman	Season 1 Episode 13: "Where's the Million Dollars?"
1963–1964	The Defenders	Multiple roles	Season 3 Episode 6: "The Cruel Hook" Season 4 Episode 3: "Hero of the People"
1963–1965	Mr. Novak	Multiple roles	Season 1 Episode 1: "First Year, First Day" Season 2 Episode 15: "An Elephant is Like a Tree"
1964	Bob Hope Presents the Chrysler Theatre	Sergeant Slade	Season 1 Episode 22: "A Case of Armed Robbery"
1964	Slattery's People	Frank Radcliff	Season 1 Episode 1: "Question: What is Truth?" Season 1 Episode 3: "Question: Remember the Dark Sins of Youth?" Season 1 Episode 11: "Question: Do the Ignorant Sleep in Pure White Beds?" Season 1 Episode 12: "Question: Which One Has the Privilege?"
1964	The Reporter	Max Holte	Season 1 Episode 13: "Vote for Murder"
1964	The Farmer's Daughter	George Chase	Season 2 Episode 15: "Like Father, Like Son"
1964–1966	Gunsmoke	Sergeant Wilks	Season 10 Episode 8: "Hung High" Season 12 Episode 8: "The Whispering Tree"
1964–1965	Profiles in Courage	Multiple roles	Season 1 Episode 4: "Richard T. Ely" Season 1 Episode 17: "Hamilton Fish"
1965	Voyage to the Bottom of the Sea	Brynov	Season 1 Episode 27: "The Exile"
1965	Burke's Law	Pablo Vasquez	Season 3 Episode 6: "Nightmare in the Sun"
1965	A Man Called Shenandoah	Sam Chance	Season 1 Episode 7: "The Verdict"
1965–1967	The Fugitive	Multiple roles	Season 2 Episode 26: "Masquerade" Season 3 Episode 6: "Three Cheers for Little Boy Blue" Season 4 Episode 15: "Run the Man Down"
1966	Please Don't Eat the Daisies	Alvin	Season 1 Episode 20: "My Good Friend, Whatsisname"
1966	The Rat Patrol	Captain Friedrich	Season 1 Episode 2: "The Life Against Death Raid"
1966	Run for Your Life	Cappi	Season 2 Episode 4: "The Committee for the 25th"
1966	Felony Squad	Bull Bradovich	Season 1 Episode 13: "The Killer Instinct"
1966	The Doomsday Flight	Feldman	Television film
1966–1968	The F.B.I.	Multiple roles	Season 1 Episode 28: "The Tormentors" Season 3 Episode 13: "The Dynasty" Season 4 Episode 21: "The Attorney"
1967	The Girl from U.N.C.L.E.	George Kramer	Season 1 Episode 26: "The Double-O-Nothing Affair"
1967	Iron Horse	Ned Morley	Season 2 Episode 16: "The Prisoners"
1967–1968	The Invaders	Multiple roles	Season 1 Episode 16: "Wall of Crystal" Season 2 Episode 23: "The Miracle"
1967–1969	Judd, for the Defense	Multiple roles	Season 1 Episode 3: "The Other Face of the Law" Season 2 Episode 17: "The Law and Order Blues: "Part 2"
1967–1969	Ironside	Multiple roles	Season 1 Episode 15: "The Fourteenth Runner" Season 2 Episode 26: "Not with a Whimper, But a Bang"
1967–1977	Insight	Multiple roles	Episode 183: "Seed of Dissent" Episode 198: "Three Cornered Flag" Episode 310: "The Poker Game" Episode 327: "A Woman of Principal" Episode 334: "The Wrinkle Squad" Episode 343: "The Freak" Episode 411: "This Side of Eden"
1968	The Wild Wild West	Furman Crotty	Season 3 Episode 22: "The Night of the Amnesiac"
1969	Mission: Impossible	George Simpson	Season 3 Episode 13: "The Mind of Stefan Miklos"
1969	Medical Center	Coach Trask	Season 1 Episode 1: "The Last Ten Yards"
1969	The Name of the Game	Multiple roles	Season 1 Episode 17: "The Inquiry" Season 2 Episode 8: "The Perfect Image"
1969	Here Come the Brides	Matt Balter	Season 1 Episode 14: "The Firemaker" Season 2 Episode 8: "The Legend of Big Foot"
1969	CBS Playhouse	Nat Congdon	Season 3 Episode 2: "Sadbird"
1969	Daughter of the Mind	Saul Wiener	Television film
1970	House on Greenapple Road	Sheriff Muntz	Television film
1970	The Old Man Who Cried Wolf	Dr. Morheim	Television film
1970–1971	The Mod Squad	Multiple roles	Season 2 Episode 25: "Should Auld Acquaintance Be Forgot?" Season 4 Episode 5: "Color of Laughter, Color of Tears" Season 5 Episode 1: "The Connection"
1970–1977	The Mary Tyler Moore Show	Lou Grant	166 episodes
1971	They Call It Murder	Chief Otto Larkin	Television film
1971	The Last Child	Barstow	Television film
1972	Cade's County	Nick Grainger	Season 1 Episode 23: "The Fake"
1972	Haunts of the Very Rich	Al Hunsicker	Television film
1973	The Girl Most Likely to...	Ralph Varone	Television film
1973–1976	Police Story	Multiple roles	Season 1 Pilot Episode: "Slow Boy" Season 2 Episode 1: "A Dangerous Age" Season 4 Episode 5: "Three Days to Thirty"
1974	Rhoda	Lou Grant	Season 1 Episode 8: "Rhoda's Wedding"
1975	The Wide World of Mystery	Detective Ed Ames	Episode: "The Impersonation Murder Case"
1975	Death Scream	Peter Singleton	Television film
1975	Hey, I'm Alive	Ralph Flores	Television film
1975	Hawaii Five-O	August March	Season 8 Episode 14: "Wooden Model of a Rat"
1976	Rich Man, Poor Man	Axel Jordache	Season 1 Episode 1: "Part 1: Chapters 1 and 2" Season 1 Episode 2: "Part 2: Chapters 3 and 4"
1977	Roots	Captain Thomas Davies	Season 1 Episode 1: "Part 1" Season 1 Episode 3: "Part 3"
1977	The Gathering	Adam Thornton	Television film
1977–1982	Lou Grant	Lou Grant	114 episodes
1978	Great Performances	Various characters	Season 7 Episode 6: "The Good Doctor"
1979	The Family Man	Eddie Madden	Television film
1981	The Marva Collins Story	Narrator	Voice, television film
1984	Saturday Night Live	Himself (host)	Episode: "Ed Asner/The Kinks"
1984–1985	Off the Rack	Sam Waltman	Season 1 Pilot Episode Season 1 Episode 1: "Partners" Season 1 Episode 2: "A Date with Kate" Season 1 Episode 3: "Here Comes the Bribe" Season 1 Episode 4: "Who Do You Trust?" Season 1 Episode 5: "The Letter" Season 1 Episode 6: "Immigration Man"
1985	Tender Is the Night	Devereux Warren	Miniseries
1985	The Greatest Adventure: Stories from the Bible	Joshua	Voice, Season 1 Episode 5: "Joshua and the Battle of Jericho"
1986	Tall Tales & Legends	Lucky Jake	Season 1 Episode 4: "My Darlin' Clementine"
1986	Highway to Heaven	Harold	Season 2 Episode 17: "The Last Assignment"
1986	Kate's Secret	Dr. Resnick	Television film
1986	Vital Signs	Matthew St James	Television film
1986	The Christmas Star	Horace McNickle	Television film
1987	Cracked Up	Reverend Vincent Owens	Television film
1987–1988	The Bronx Zoo	Principal Joe Danzig	21 episodes
1988	A Friendship in Vienna	Opah Oskar Reikman	Television film
1990	Not a Penny More, Not a Penny Less	Harvey Metcalfe	Television film
1990–1996	Captain Planet and the Planeteers	Hoggish Greedly	Voice, 33 episodes
1991	Switched at Birth	Ted Marx	Television film
1991	Yes, Virginia, There Is a Santa Claus	Edward P. Mitchell	Television film
1991–1992	The Trials of Rosie O'Neill	Walter Kovacs	17 episodes
1992	Cruel Doubt	Bill Osteen	Season 1 Episode 1 Season 1 Episode 2
1992	Fish Police	Chief Abalone	Voice, Season 1 Episode 1: "The Shell Game" Voice, Season 1 Episode 2: "A Fish Out of Water" Voice, Season 1 Episode 3: "Beauty's Only Fin Deep" Voice, Season 1 Episode 4: "The Codfather" Voice, Season 1 Episode 5: "The Two Gils" Voice, Season 1 Episode 6: "No Way to Treat a Fillet-dy"
1992	Batman: The Animated Series	Roland Daggett	Voice, Season 1 Episode 4: "Feat of Clay: Part I" Voice, Season 1 Episode 5: "Feat of Clay: Part II" Voice, Season 1 Episode 12: "Appointment in Crime Alley" Voice, Season 1 Episode 33: "Cat Scratch Fever"
1992–1993	Hearts Afire	George Lahti	12 episodes
1993	Animaniacs	Papa Bear	Voice, Season 1 Episode 12: "Garage Sale of the Century"
1993	Bonkers	Grumps	Voice, Season 1 Episode 58: "Seems Like Old Toons"
1993	Gypsy	Pop	Television film
1994	Dinosaurs	Evil Georgie	Voice, Season 4 Episode 14: "Georgie Must Die!"
1994–1995	Thunder Alley	Gil Jones	27 episodes
1994–1996	Gargoyles	Hudson, Jack Danforth, Burbank, Security Guard #2	Voice, 46 episodes
1994–1998	Spider-Man: The Animated Series	J. Jonah Jameson	Voice, 35 episodes
1995	Duckman	Mort Sidelman	Voice, Season 2 Episode 6: "The Germ Turns"
1995–1997	Freakazoid!	Sergeant Mike Cosgrove	Voice, 20 episodes
1996	Gone in the Night	Detective John Waters	Television film
1996	Bruno the Kid	Engineer	Voice
1996	Roseanne	Lou Grant	Season 9 Episode 1: "Call Waiting"; uncredited
1996	The Magic School Bus	General Araneus	Voice, Season 3 Episode 3: "Spins a Web"
1996	The Story of Santa Claus	Santa Claus	Voice, Television film
1996	The Real Adventures of Jonny Quest	Von Romme / Sentry #4	Voice, Season 2 Episode 11: "Nuclear Netherworld"
1996–1997	Mad About You	Zigmund Klarik	Season 4 Episode 23: "The Finale: Part 2" Season 4 Episode 24: "The Finale: Part 3" Season 5 Episode 12: "The Handyman"
1996–1997	Gargoyles: The Goliath Chronicles	Hudson, Burbank, Street Person #2	Voice, 10 episodes
1997	Dog's Best Friend	Jeep	Television film
1997	Adventures from the Book of Virtues	Daniel	Voice, Season 1 Episode 10: "Faith"
1997	Dead Man's Gun	Jebusi McKinney	Season 1 Episode 11: "Next of Kin"
1997	The Angry Beavers	Risk Keeper	Voice, Season 1 Episode 8: "I Dare You"
1997	Life with Louie	Mr. Applegate	Voice, Season 3 Episode 9: "The Kiss Is the Thing"
1997–1998	Jumanji	The Judge	Voice, Season 2 Episode 10: "The Trial" Voice, Season 3 Episode 9: "The Ultimate Weapon"
1997–2004	The Practice	Multiple roles	Season 2 Episode 3: "The Blessing" Season 8 Episode 13: "Going Home" Season 8 Episode 14: "Pre-Trial Blues" Season 8 Episode 15: "Mr. Shore Goes to Town"
1997	Payback	Jack Patkanis	Television film
1997–1998	The New Adventures of Zorro	Additional voices	26 episodes
1998	Soul Man	Frank Weber	Season 2 Episode 10: "Yes Sir, That's My Baby"
1998	Ask Harriet	Old Man Russell	Season 1 Episode 2: "Hot Coco" Season 1 Episode 5: "Lips That Pass in the Night" Season 1 Episode 13: "Pumps and Circumstances"
1998	The Closer	Carl Dobson	10 episodes
1998	More Tales of the City	Jack Lederer	Miniseries; Season 1 Episode 5
1998	Hercules	Mentor	Voice, Season 1 Episode 20: "Hercules and the Disappearing Heroes"
1998	Maggie Winters	Nathan Winters	Season 1 Episode 9: "Angstgiving Day"
1998	The X-Files	Maurice	Season 6 Episode 6: "How the Ghosts Stole Christmas"
1998–2000	Superman: The Animated Series	Granny Goodness	Voice, Season 2 Episode 27: "Little Girl Lost: Part I" Voice, Season 2 Episode 28: "Little Girl Lost: Part II" Voice, Season 3 Episode 12: "Legacy: Part I" Voice, Season 3 Episode 13: "Legacy: Part II"
1999	The Sissy Duckling	Elmer's father	Voice, television film
1999	The Simpsons	Editor	Voice, Season 11 Episode 3: "Guess Who's Coming to Criticize Dinner?"
1999–2000	Recess	Thaddeus T. Third V	Voice, Season 4 Episode 13: "The Biggest Trouble Ever" Voice, Season 5 Episode 4: "The C-Note"
1999	Olive, the Other Reindeer	Santa Claus	Television film
2000	Common Ground	Ira	Television film
2000	Touched by an Angel	Bud	Season 6 Episode 17: "Here I Am"
2000	The Hoop Life	Coach	Season 1 Episode 22: "The Second Chance"
2000	Arliss	Lenny Crowley	Season 5 Episode 10: "Last Call"
2000	Becoming Dick	Davis Aldrich	Television film
2000	Buzz Lightyear of Star Command	Fixer	Voice, Season 1 Episode 11: "The Return of XL"
2000	The Wild Thornberrys	Frank Hunter	Voice, Season 3 Episode 20: "The Anniversary"
2000–2001	Johnny Bravo	Multiple roles	Voice, Season 3 Episode 2: "Virtual Johnny/Hunted/Hold That Schmoe" Voice, Season 3 Episode 17: "The Hansel and Gretel Witch Project/I.Q. Johnny/Get Stinky"
2001	Max Steel	Chuck Marshak	Voice, Season 1 Episode 1: "Strangers" Voice, Season 1 Episode 6: "Spear-Carriers" Voice, Season 1 Episode 8: "Sharks" Voice, Season 1 Episode 12: "Scions"
2001	The Huntress	Max Quinlin	Season 1 Episode 14: "Generations"
2001	Family Guy	Steve Bellows	Voice, Season 3 Episode 4: "One If by Clam, Two If by Sea"
2001	Dharma & Greg	Earl Tucker	Season 4 Episode 22: "How This Happened"
2001	Curb Your Enthusiasm	Mr. Weiner	Season 2 Episode 6: "The Acupuncturist"
2001	The Ellen Show	Santa Claus	Season 1 Episode 11: "Ellen's First Christmas"
2001	3×3 Eyes	Grandpa Ayanokoji	Voice, English dub
2001–2002	King of the Hill	Stinky	Voice, Season 5 Episode 10: "Yankee Hankee" Voice, Season 6 Episode 11: "Unfortunate Son"
2002	John XXIII: The Pope of Peace	Angelo Roncalli	Television film
2002	Teamo Supremo	Mr. Large	Voice, Season 2 Episode 5: "Thog the Caveman Returns/Mr. Large's Slippery Scheme"
2002	The Man Who Saved Christmas	Charles Gilbert	Television film
2003	ER	Dr. James McNulty	Season 9 Episode 11: "A Little Help from My Friends" Season 9 Episode 12: "A Saint in the City" Season 9 Episode 13: "No Good Deed Goes Unpunished"
2003	Grim & Evil	Mr. Voorhees	Voice, Season 1 Episode 9: "Grim for a Day/ChickenBall Z/Max Courage!"
2003	Spider-Man: The New Animated Series	Officer Barr	Voice, Season 1 Episode 2: "Keeping Secrets" Voice, Season 1 Episode 6: "Heroes and Villains" Voice, Season 1 Episode 8: "Law of the Jungle" Voice, Season 1 Episode 13: "Mind Games: Part 2"
2003	Duck Dodgers	Guard Captain	Voice, Season 1 Episode 5: "I'm Going to Get You Fat Sucker/Detained Duck"
2003	National Lampoon's Christmas Vacation 2	Uncle Nick	Television film
2003	The Commission	Captain J. W. Fritz	Television film
2004–2005	Justice League Unlimited	Multiple roles	Voice, Season 1 Episode 4: "Hawk and Dove" Voice, Season 2 Episode 2: "The Ties That Bind"
2004–2005	Center of the Universe	Art Barnett	12 episodes
2005	The Dead Zone	Marty Bracknell	Season 4 Episode 10: "Coming Home"
2005–2014	The Boondocks	Ed Wuncler Sr.	Voice, Season 1 Episode 1: "The Garden Party" Voice, Season 1 Episode 10: "The Itis" Voice, Season 1 Episode 14: "The Block Is Hot" Voice, Season 3 Episode 3: "The Red Ball" Voice, Season 3 Episode 15: "It's Goin' Down" Voice, Season 4 Episode 9: "Stinkmeaner: Begun the Clone War Has"
2006	The Christmas Card	Luke Spellman	Television film
2006	W.I.T.C.H.	Napoleon	Voice, Season 2 Episode 21: "U Is for Undivided" Voice, Season 2 Episode 23: "W Is for Witch" Voice, Season 2 Episode 26: "Z Is for Zenith"
2006–2007	Studio 60 on the Sunset Strip	Wilson White	Season 1 Episode 1: "Pilot" Season 1 Episode 5: "The Long Lead Story" Season 1 Episode 7: "Nevada Day: Part 1" Season 1 Episode 8: "Nevada Day: Part 2" Season 1 Episode 11: "The Christmas Show" Season 1 Episode 12: "Monday"
2007	Andy Barker, P.I.	Mickey Doyle	Season 1 Episode 6: "The Lady Varnishes"
2008	The Spectacular Spider-Man	Uncle Ben Parker	Voice, Season 1 Episode 12: "Intervention"
2009	Star-ving	Mr. Lipschitz	Season 1 Episode 10: "El Al-Qaeda"
2009	The Line	Patrick	Season 1 Episodes 1, 2, 3, 4, 5, 6, 7
2009	CSI: NY	Abraham Klein / Klaus Braun	Season 5 Episode 22: "Yahrzeit"
2009	Up: Upisodes	Carl Fredricksen	Voice; Miniseries, 3 episodes
2009–2015	WordGirl	Kid Potato	Voice, Season 2 Episode 16: "Meat My Dad" Voice, Season 7 Episode 8: "My Dad, My Teacher, My Dad, My Teacher/Castle! Dungeon! Fortress! So?"
2010	The Sarah Silverman Program	Commandant Von Reichenstein	Season 3 Episode 10: "Wowschwitz"
2010–2011	The Cleveland Show	Multiple roles	Season 1 Episode 14: "The Curious Case of Junior Working at the Stool" Season 2 Episode 3: "How Cleveland Got His Groove Back" Season 2 Episode 8: "Murray Christmas" Season 2 Episode 15: "The Blue, the Gray and the Brown" Season 3 Episode 6: "Sex and the Biddy"
2010–2019	American Dad!	Grandpa Smith	Season 6 Episode 6: "There Will Be Bad Blood" Season 6 Episode 16: "Jenny Fromdabloc" Season 14 Episode 4: "Rabbit Ears" Season 14 Episode 6: "Lost Boys"
2011	Young Justice	Kent Nelson	Voice, Season 1 Episode 7: "Denial"
2011	Working Class	Hank Greziak	Season 1 Episode 1: "The Buddy System" Season 1 Episode 4: "Eye for an Eye" Season 1 Episode 6: "Pay Back" Season 1 Episode 8: "Wine Pairing" Season 1 Episode 9: "B-Day Invasion" Season 1 Episode 11: "Hire Education"
2011	Too Big to Fail	Warren Buffett	Television film
2011	Royal Pains	Ted Roth	Season 3 Episode 4: "The Shaw/Hank Redemption" Season 3 Episode 5: "A Man Called Grandpa"
2011–2017	Michael: Every Day	Dr. Wasserman	Season 1 Episode 4: "Sleeping with People" Season 1 Episode 5: "Bridges" Season 1 Episode 8: "Being Alone" Season 1 Episode 10: "Sweating" Season 1 Episode 11: "Failure" Season 1 Episode 12: "Endings" Season 2 Episode 6: "Hodophobia: Part 2"
2012	The Middle	Ben	Season 3 Episode 19: "The Paper Route"
2012	Hot in Cleveland	Jameson Lyons	Season 3 Episode 15: "Rubber Ball"
2012	Hawaii Five-0	August March	Season 2 Episode 19: "Kalele (Faith)" Season 3 Episode 2: "Kanalua (Doubt)"
2012	Home Alone: The Holiday Heist	Mr. Carson	Television film
2012	Regular Show	Santa Claus	Voice, Season 4 Episode 9: "The Christmas Special"
2013	Law & Order: Special Victims Unit	Coach Martin Schultz	Season 14 Episode 13: "Monster's Legacy"
2013	Maron	Larry Maron	Unaired pilot
2013	The Glades	Dr. Ted Hardy	Season 4 Episode 3: "Killer Barbecue" Season 4 Episode 4: "Magic Longworth" Season 4 Episode 10: "Gallerinas"
2013	The Crazy Ones	Mr. Finger	Season 1 Episode 8: "The Stan Wood Account"
2013	Christmas on the Bayou	Papa Noel	Television film
2014	Men at Work	Bob	Season 3 Episode 5: "Gigo-Milo"
2014	Mom	Jack Bumgartner	Season 2 Episode 5: "Kimchi and a Monkey Playing Harmonica"
2014	Chasing Life	Artie Carver	Season 1 Episode 11: "Locks of Love"
2014	Chozen	Lil' Wheely	Episode: "Sell, Sell, Sell" (Unaired)
2014	Elf: Buddy's Musical Christmas	Santa Claus	Voice, television special
2015	The Good Wife	Guy Redmayne	Season 6 Episode 13: "Dark Money" Season 6 Episode 17: "Undisclosed Recipients"
2015	Criminal Minds	Roy Brooks	Season 10 Episode 20: "A Place at the Table"
2015	Murdoch Mysteries	Kris Kringle	Season 9 Episode: "A Merry Murdoch Christmas"
2015	All of My Heart	Vern	Television film
2015–2018	Forgive Me	Bishop	Season 2 Episode 16: "Blessed Art Thou" Season 2 Episode 18: "Blessed Is the Fruit" Season 3 Episode 2: "I Detest All My Sins Because of Your Just Punishments" Season 3 Episode 3: "Most of All Because They Offend You" Season 3 Episode 5: "Worthy of All My Love" Season 3 Episode 8: "To Avoid the Near Occasion of Sin"
2016	SpongeBob SquarePants	Angry Old Timer	Voice, Season 10 Episode 1: "Whirly Brains"
2017	Bones	Rufus Tucker	Season 12 Episode 3: "The New Tricks in the Old Dogs"
2017	A StoryBots Christmas	Santa	Television special
2017	All of My Heart: Inn Love	Vern	Television film
2017	Titanic: Sinking the Myths	Wilhelm Müller	Documentary
2018	MacGyver	Saul	Season 2 Episode 20: "Skyscraper - Power"
2018	All of My Heart: The Wedding	Vern	Television film
2018–2021	Cobra Kai	Sid Weinberg	Season 1 Episode 1: "Ace Degenerate" Season 1 Episode 8: "Molting" Season 3 Episode 3: "Now You're Gonna Pay"
2019	Dead to Me	Abe Rifkin	Season 1 Episode 1: "Pilot" Season 1 Episode 2: "Maybe I'm Crazy" Season 1 Episode 3: "It's All My Fault" Season 1 Episode 7: "I Can Handle It" Season 1 Episode 9: "I Have to Be Honest"
2019	Doom Patrol	Hospital Patient	Season 1 Episode 13: "Flex Patrol"
2019–2021	Grace and Frankie	Howard Jay	Season 5 Episode 9: "The Website" Season 7 Episode 4: "The Circumcision"
2020	Modern Family	Herschel Braverman	Season 11 Episode 12: "Dead on a Rival"
2020	Ballmastrz: 9009	Rupert T. Digzfield IV	Voice, Season 2 Episode 10: "Onward, True Blue Friends Win Eternal; Paladin of the Heavens, Start Today!"
2020	Blue Bloods	Chuck Kennedy	Season 10 Episode 15: "Vested Interests"
2020	Briarpatch	James Staghorne Sr.	Season 1 Episode 3: "Terrible, Shocking Things" Season 1 Episode 5: "Behind God's Back" Season 1 Episode 7: "Butterscotch"
2020	Royalties	Papa / Hal	Season 1 Episode 2: "Break It In"
2020	Teen Titans Go!	Sergeant Mike Cosgrove	Voice, Season 6 Episode 33: "Huggbees"
2020–2022	Central Park	Ambrose Brandenham	Voice, Season 1 Episode 7: "Squirrel, Interrupted" Voice, Season 2 Episode 4: "Of Course You Know This Means Ward" Voice, Season 2 Episode 16: "The Lyin' in Winter" (episode released posthumously) Voice, Season 3 Episode 6: "A Matter of Life and Boeuf" (episode released posthumously)
2021	Let's Be Real	Ed Asner	Episode: "Episode 101"
2021	Dug Days	Carl Fredricksen	Voice; Disney+ Original Short Series, posthumous release; dedicated to his memory
2021	The Premise	Mr. Holmes	Season 1 Episode 3: "The Ballad of Jesse Wheeler"; posthumous release
2021	Muppets Haunted Mansion	Claude	Television special, posthumous release; dedicated to his memory
2021	Captain Daddy	Grandpa	Television film; posthumous release
2021	Scarlett	Lou	Television film; posthumous release

== Stage ==
Year	Title	Role	Notes	Ref.
1960	Face of a Hero	Perry Cates	Eugene O'Neill Theatre, Broadway	
1989	Born Yesterday	Harry Brock	46th Street Theatre, Broadway	
2005	Orgasms	Voice of God (Pre-recorded)	SoHo Playhouse	
2012	Grace	Karl	Cort Theater, Broadway	
2011–2014	FDR	Franklin D. Roosevelt	US Tour	

== Video games ==
Year	Title	Voice role	Notes
2000	Buzz Lightyear of Star Command	Fixer	
2003	Star Wars: Knights of the Old Republic	Vrook Lamar	
2004	Star Wars Knights of the Old Republic II: The Sith Lords	Vrook Lamar	
2004	X-Men Legends	Healer	
2009	Up	Carl Fredricksen	
2012	Rush: A Disney-Pixar Adventure	Carl Fredricksen	

== Audio ==
Year	Title	Role	Notes
2015	Rain of the Ghosts	Old Joe Charone	Audiobook
2022	The Last Saturday Night	Gerald	Podcast series; posthumous release

== Radio ==
- The Odyssey, National Radio Theater, 1981, published by Blackstone Audio – Narrator
- Top Secret: The Battle for the Pentagon Papers, LA Theatre Works, 1991, published by LA Theatre Works – Ben Bradlee

== See also ==
- List of awards and nominations received by Ed Asner
