= Ben Weber (actor) =

American film and television actor (born 1972)

- Born: May 14, 1972 (age 54); Bellingham, Washington
- Occupation: Actor
- Years active: 1996-2019
- Spouse: Kara Lynn Berklich (2000-)

Ben Weber (born May 14, 1972) is an American film and television actor. He has appeared in TV series such as Sex and the City and Everwood and films such as Kissing Jessica Stein, The Christmas Card, and Coach Carter. Weber also played David on the ABC Family television series The Secret Life of the American Teenager along with Molly Ringwald. In addition to film and television work, Weber was one of the original cavemen in the GEICO Cavemen advertising campaign. On the West Wing, Weber played Vic Faison, who went on to marry Ellie Bartlet, the President's middle daughter.

== Filmography ==
=== Film ===
Year	Title	Role	Notes
1996	Twister	Stanley	
1996	The Mirror Has Two Faces	Male student	
1999	Giving It Up	Peter McGrath	
2000	The Broken Hearts Club: A Romantic Comedy	Patrick	
2000	Gun Shy	Mark	
2001	Kissing Jessica Stein	Larry	
2003	Little Red Light	George Meyer	Short
2003	Fast Cars & Babies	Jeff	Short
2004	King of the Corner	Dr. Collins	
2005	Coach Carter	Mr. Gesek	
2007	Look	Marty	
2007	The Kopper Kettle	John	Short
2007	The Brass Teapot	John	Short
2011	Losing Control	Dr. Rudy Mann	
2013	What Should We Watch?	Donovan	Short
2015	Come Simi	Carl	
TBA	Heart Burns	Dan	Short, post-production

=== Television ===
Year	Title	Role	Notes
1998–99	Sex and the City	Skipper Johnston	Recurring role (seasons 1–2)
2000	The Only Living Boy in New York	Josh	TV film
2001	Law & Order	Ethan Capp	Episode: "Sunday in the Park with Jorge"
2003	Miss Match	Craig Baxter	Episode: "Addicted to Love"
2003–04	Everwood	Chris Beals	Guest role (season 2)
2005	ER	Lou	Episodes: "Man with No Name", "Wake Up"
2005	The West Wing	Vic Faison	Episodes: "Here Today", "Undecideds", "The Wedding"
2006	The Christmas Card	Paul	TV film
2007	Medium	Morgan Turley	Episodes: "Better Off Dead"
2009–2013	The Secret Life of the American Teenager	David Johnson	Recurring role (seasons 1–2), guest (season 5)
2016	NCIS: Los Angeles	Bruce Carter	Episode: "Crazy Train"
2017	Manhunt: Unabomber	Andy Genelli	Main role
