= List of awards and nominations received by Ed Asner =

Ed Asner awards and nominations
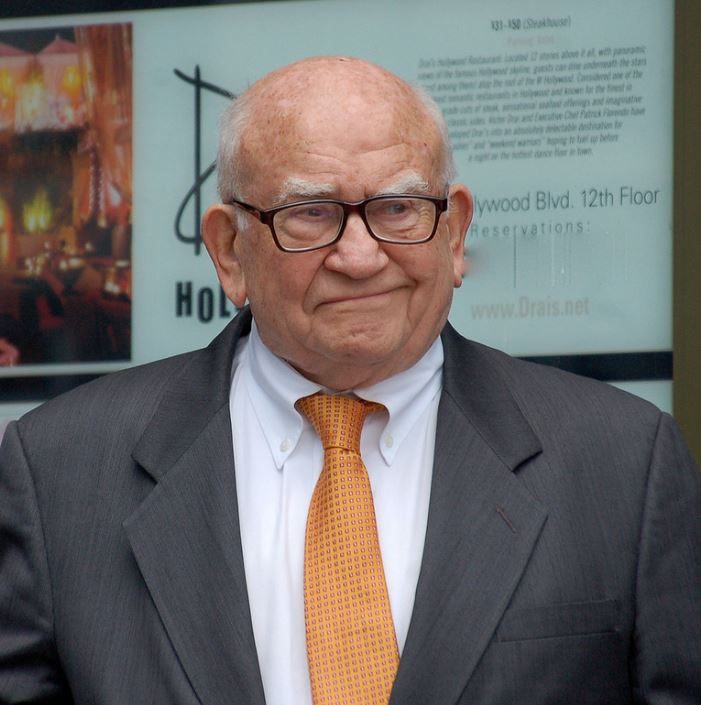
- Asner in 2013
Awards and nominations (Note: Certain award groups do not simply award one winner. They recognize several different recipients have runners-up and have third place. Since this is a specific recognition and is different from losing an award, runner-up mentions are considered wins in this award tally. Awards in certain categories do not have prior nominations and only winners are announced by the jury. For simplification and to avoid errors, each award in this list has been presumed to have had a prior nomination.)
Award	Wins	Nominations
Totals
Behind the Voice Actors Awards	1	1
CableACE Awards	0	2
Character and Morality in Entertainment Awards	1	1
Daytime Emmy Awards	0	4
Golden Globe Awards	5	11
Online Film & Television Association Awards	0	2
Primetime Emmy Awards	7	17
TV Land Awards	1	1
Visual Effects Society Awards	1	1
Wins	25
Nominations	48

Ed Asner was an American actor who received various awards and nominations. With seven Primetime Emmy Awards, Asner has won the most performance awards of any male performer in the history of the Primetime Emmy Awards. As a voice actor, he received notices for his work on animated series and films, including four Daytime Emmy Award nominations. Asner also received several honorary awards, including a star on the Hollywood Walk of Fame and the Screen Actors Guild Life Achievement Award.

Asner experienced much success in television during the 1970s, garnering acclaim for his role as Lou Grant on The Mary Tyler Moore Show (1970–1977) and the eponymous spin-off series based on Grant (1977–1982). For his role as Lou Grant, Asner earned three Emmy awards for Outstanding Supporting Actor in a Comedy Series and two for Outstanding Lead Actor in a Drama Series, becoming the first actor to win an Emmy award in both comedy and drama genres for the same role. He earned further acclaim for his work in television miniseries Rich Man, Poor Man and Roots as well as five Golden Globe Awards for his television work.

== Audie Awards ==
The Audie Awards are awards for achievement in spoken word, particularly audiobook narration and audiodrama performance, published in the United States of America. They are presented by the Audio Publishers Association (APA). Asner received one award and one nomination.

Year	Category	Recipient/Nominated work	Result	Ref.
1997	Inspirational/Spiritual	Grow Old Along with Me, the Best Is Yet to Be	Won	
1997	Multi-Voiced Performance	Grow Old Along with Me, the Best Is Yet to Be	Nominated	
1997	Inspirational/Spiritual	Conversations with God	Nominated	
1997	Multi-Voiced Performance	Star Wars: Return of the Jedi	Nominated	
1997	Audiobook Adapted from Another Medium	Sleeping Beauty	Won	
2000	Audiobook Adapted from Another Medium	The Dybbuk	Won	
2020	Business and Personal Development	The Barefoot Spirit	Nominated	

== Behind the Voice Actors Awards ==
The Behind the Voice Actors Award is an annual accolade that recognizes excellence in voice acting. Asner won an award in 2011.

Year	Category	Recipient/Nominated work	Result	Ref.
2011	Best Vocal Ensemble in a TV Special/Direct-to-DVD Title or Theatrical Short	All-Star Superman	Won	

== CableACE Awards ==
The CableACE Award, created by the National Cable Television Association, was an annual accolade that recognizes the best in cable television. Asner received two nominations.

Year	Category	Recipient/Nominated work	Result	Ref.
1984	Actor in a Dramatic or Theatrical Program	A Case of Libel	Nominated	
1989	Supporting Actor in a Movie or Miniseries	A Friendship in Vienna	Nominated	

== Character and Morality in Entertainment Awards ==
The Character and Morality in Entertainment Awards (CAMIE) are annual accolades presented to uplifting films. Asner won the Director Camie award for his work on The Christmas Card (2006).

Year	Category	Recipient/Nominated work	Result	Ref.
2007	Director Camie	The Christmas Card	Won	

== Daytime Emmy Awards ==
Created by the National Academy of Television Arts and Sciences (NATAS) and Academy of Television Arts and Sciences (ATAS) in 1974, the Daytime Emmy Award is an annual accolade that honors excellence in daytime television programming. Asner received a nomination for his voice over work in WordGirl.

Year	Category	Recipient/Nominated work	Role(s)	Result	Ref.
1991	Outstanding Performer in a Children's Series	Captain Planet and the Planeteers	Hoggish Greedly	Nominated	
1996	Outstanding Performer in an Animated Program	Spider-Man	J. Jonah Jameson	Nominated	
2010	Outstanding Performer in an Animated Program	WordGirl: Meat My Dad	Kid Potato	Nominated	
2017	Outstanding Performer in a Children's, Preschool Children's or Educational and Informational Program	A StoryBots Christmas	Santa Claus	Nominated	

== Golden Globe Awards ==
The Golden Globe Award, presented by the Hollywood Foreign Press Association (HFPA), is an annual accolade awarded for outstanding artistic achievement in film and television. Out of eleven nominations, Asner won five awards; two for The Mary Tyler Moore Show, one for Rich Man, Poor Man, and two for Lou Grant.

Year	Category	Recipient/Nominated work	Role(s)	Result	Ref.
1971	Best Supporting Actor – Television	The Mary Tyler Moore Show	Lou Grant	Won	
1972	Best Supporting Actor – Television	The Mary Tyler Moore Show	Lou Grant	Nominated	
1973	Best Supporting Actor – Television	The Mary Tyler Moore Show	Lou Grant	Nominated	
1974	Best TV Actor – Musical or Comedy	The Mary Tyler Moore Show	Lou Grant	Nominated	
1975	Best Supporting Actor – Television	The Mary Tyler Moore Show	Lou Grant	Won	
1976	Best Supporting Actor – Television	Rich Man, Poor Man	Axel Jordache	Won	
1977	Best Actor – Television Series Drama	Lou Grant	Lou Grant	Won	
1978	Best Actor – Television Series Drama	Lou Grant	Lou Grant	Nominated	
1979	Best Actor – Television Series Drama	Lou Grant	Lou Grant	Won	
1980	Best Actor – Television Series Drama	Lou Grant	Lou Grant	Nominated	
1981	Best Actor – Television Series Drama	Lou Grant	Lou Grant	Nominated	

== Grammy Awards ==
The Grammy Awards are awards presented by the Recording Academy of the United States to recognize "outstanding" achievements in the music industry. They are regarded by many as the most prestigious, significant awards in the music industry worldwide. Asner received two nominations.

Year	Category	Recipient/Nominated work	Result	Ref.
1997	Best Spoken Word Or Non-musical Album	Grow Old Along with Me, the Best Is Yet to Be	Nominated	
2010	Best Spoken Word Album for Children	Scat	Nominated	

== Online Film & Television Association ==
The Online Film & Television Association Award is an annual accolade that recognizes excellence in film and television.

Year	Category	Recipient/Nominated work	Result	Ref.
2009	Best Guest Actor in a Drama Series	CSI: NY	Nominated	
2010	Best Voice-Over Performance	Up	Nominated	

== Primetime Emmy Awards ==
The Primetime Emmy Award, presented by the Academy of Television Arts & Sciences (ATAS), is an annual accolade honoring outstanding achievement in primetime television programming. Asner received seventeen nominations, winning five Emmys for his role as Lou Grant and two others for his work on Rich Man, Poor Man and Roots.

Year	Category	Recipient/Nominated work	Role(s)	Result	Ref.
1971	Outstanding Performance by an Actor in a Supporting Role in Comedy	The Mary Tyler Moore Show	Lou Grant	Won	
1972	Outstanding Performance by an Actor in a Supporting Role in Comedy	The Mary Tyler Moore Show	Lou Grant	Won	
1973	Outstanding Performance by an Actor in a Supporting Role in Comedy	The Mary Tyler Moore Show	Lou Grant	Nominated	
1974	Best Supporting Actor in Comedy	The Mary Tyler Moore Show	Lou Grant	Nominated	
1975	Outstanding Continuing Performance by a Supporting Actor in a Comedy Series	The Mary Tyler Moore Show	Lou Grant	Won	
1976	Outstanding Continuing Performance by a Supporting Actor in a Comedy Series	The Mary Tyler Moore Show	Lou Grant	Nominated	
1976	Outstanding Lead Actor for a Single Appearance in a Drama or Comedy Series	Rich Man, Poor Man (for "Part I: Chapters 1 and 2")	Axel Jordache	Won	
1977	Outstanding Continuing Performance by a Supporting Actor in a Comedy Series	The Mary Tyler Moore Show	Lou Grant	Nominated	
1977	Outstanding Single Performance by a Supporting Actor in a Comedy or Drama Series	Roots (for "Part I")	Captain Thomas Davies	Won	
1978	Outstanding Lead Actor in a Drama Series	Lou Grant	Lou Grant	Won	
1979	Outstanding Lead Actor in a Drama Series	Lou Grant	Lou Grant	Nominated	
1980	Outstanding Lead Actor in a Drama Series	Lou Grant	Lou Grant	Won	
1981	Outstanding Lead Actor in a Drama Series	Lou Grant	Lou Grant	Nominated	
1982	Outstanding Lead Actor in a Drama Series	Lou Grant	Lou Grant	Nominated	
1992	Outstanding Supporting Actor in a Drama Series	The Trials of Rosie O'Neill	Walter Kovacs	Nominated	
2007	Outstanding Supporting Actor in a Miniseries or Movie	The Christmas Card	Luke Spelman	Nominated	
2009	Outstanding Guest Actor in a Drama Series	CSI: NY for "Yahrzeit"	Abraham Klein	Nominated	

== TV Land Awards ==
The TV Land Award is an annual accolade created by Michael Levitt which honors the best programs now off the air.

Year	Category	Recipient/Nominated work	Result	Ref.
2004	Groundbreaking Show	The Mary Tyler Moore Show	Won	

== Visual Effects Society Awards ==
The Visual Effects Society (VES) presents an annual accolade for outstanding achievement in visual effects in film and television. Asner's character Carl from the 2009 film Up won the award for Outstanding Animated Character in an Animated Feature Motion Picture.

Year	Category	Recipient/Nominated work	Result	Ref.
2009	Outstanding Animated Character in an Animated Feature Motion Picture	Up	Won	

== Other awards ==
=== Film festivals ===
Award	Year	Category	Recipients and nominees	Result	Ref.
Golden Door International Film Festival of Jersey City	2007	Best Actor in a Short	Pacific Edge	Won	
Los Angeles Independent Film Festival Awards	2007	Best Actor in a Short	Pacific Edge	Won	

=== Honorary ===
Award	Year	Category	Recipients and nominees	Result	Ref.
American Academy of Achievement	1977	Golden Plate Award	Ed Asner	Won	
Banff Television Festival	1987	Award of Excellence	Ed Asner	Won	
California Independent Film Festival	2006	Life Achievement Award	Ed Asner	Won	
Gold Derby Awards	2010	Life Achievement Award (Performer)	Ed Asner	Nominated	
Hollywood Walk of Fame	1992	Star on the Walk of Fame for Television	Ed Asner	Won	
Online Film & Television Association Award	1998	TV Hall of Fame – Actors and Actresses	Ed Asner	Won	
Screen Actors Guild Award	2000	Ralph Morgan Award	Ed Asner	Won	
Screen Actors Guild Award	2002	Life Achievement Award	Ed Asner	Won	
Sedona International Film Festival	2005	Life Achievement Award	Ed Asner	Won	
