= Sheeba (film) =

- DVD release cover
- Directed by: Michael J. Jacobs
- Written by: Robin Christian
- Produced by: Robin Christian
- Starring: Dylan Patton; Edward Asner; Judge Reinhold; Ruby Handler
- Edited by: Jason Cox, Michael J. McLaughlin
- Music by: Alan Williams
- Production company: Questar Entertainment
- Distributed by: Questar Entertainment
- Release date: January 19, 2011
- Running time: 91 minutes
- Country: United States
- Language: English

Sheeba is a 2005 family film that was released on DVD on January 19, 2011. It was directed by Michael J. Jacobs, and stars Dylan Patton, Edward Asner, Judge Reinhold, Sarah Ryder, Stacey Springer, Kathy Patrick, and Ruby Handler. During production, the film's working title was Crab Orchard. It was known as Angel Dog 2 when released on DVD in the UK in 2013.

== Story ==
Sheeba is the tale of a young boy named Clay Thomas (Patton) from New York City whose parents have become estranged after the events of 9-11. His mother (Handler) elects to move them away from his firefighter father (Reinhold) to live in the country with Clay's grandfather (Asner). At first, a lonesome Clay initially struggles to fit in and make friends in the rural community, but he eventually gets into a fight with a troublemaking teenager named Wax at school and is expelled as a result. A bitter Clay is confronted by his grandfather and mother for his actions, but after learning about what had happened, Clay’s mother takes him back to school and the principal gives Clay another chance on the condition that he doesn’t start another fight in school again.

Despite a difficult start in adjusting to a new school and trying to make friends, Clay soon finds comfort and friendship with his new dog, a Border Collie named Sheeba. He also makes friends with two of the kids from his school, a girl named Kristen and a boy named Amir. When bitter tensions between Clay and Wax mount, Clay finds himself in some serious trouble. Wax eventually steals Sheeba and takes the dog to his father’s land, but when Clay arrives to get his dog back, they are both chased off and separated when Wax shoots Sheeba in the left hind leg with his father’s rifle.

As his parents reunite together and join forces with the rest of the community to find Clay, Clay spends the next two days in the remote countryside searching for his missing dog. He eventually finds Sheeba, wounded but alive, and the two of them seek refuge in an abandoned barn. Unbeknownst to either of them, Wax secretly follows them undetected, sets fire to the barn, and locks them up inside. Sheeba eventually escapes and runs off to find help, but Clay remains trapped inside the burning barn. Fortunately for Clay, Sheeba returns with his parents, friends, and an armed force of policemen and firefighters to rescue Clay and put out the fire. Clay watches with relief and joy as his parents decide to get back together again as a family, while he makes peace with his friends Kristen and Amir. Sheeba is hailed as a hero by the community for her bravery and undying loyalty to Clay and his family.

A few days later, the police inform Clay and his parents that Wax had just been arrested after admitting to starting the fire and trying to kill Clay and Sheeba. Wax’s father was also arrested for committing a number of unsolved crimes around the community after Wax revealed this secret information during his interview at the police station. With Wax and his father in prison and his family reunited at last, Clay is able to enjoy a comfortable life in the rural community with his family, friends, and his faithful dog Sheeba.

== Cast ==
- Ed Asner as Grandpa Cecil
- Judge Reinhold as Jim Thomas
- Ruby Handler as Kim Thomas
- Dylan Patton as Clay Thomas
- Betsy Zajko as Debbie
- Robin Christian as Dwayne
- Cliff Ponder as Doug
- Kumars Salehi as Amir
- Sierra Peters as Kristin
- Kyle Tolliver as Wax
- James Pobiega as Wax's Dad
- Jonathan Clodfelter as Buck
- Skye Peters as Kristin's Sister (as Skye Peters)
- Floyd Allsop as Kristin's Dad
- Bill Kephardt as Store Manager
- Ron McDaniel as Grandpa's Friend
- Greg Wolf as Doctor
- Shanah Richardson as Animal Control Officer #1
- Catherine Miller as Animal Control Officer #2
- John Simpson as Bus Driver
- Jack Houser as Truck Driver
- Doris Wenzel as Cashier
- Ed Zilewicz as Informant
- Terry Jones as Medic #1
- Michael J. Jacobs as Medic #2
- Paul Harleston as Jim's Friend
- Georgia Morgan as Mrs. Ogle
- Shawn Marmion as Fireman
- Jason Cox as Impatient Driver
- Red as Sheeba

== Critical reception ==
In an advance review, Home Media Magazine deemed Sheeba a "heartwarming family film", and declared "if you like dog films and family dramas with a happy ending, this is one to check out."

Sheeba was also awarded the Dove Family Approved Seal by the Dove Foundation.

In another review of the film, under its UK title Angel Dog 2, Mike Jeavons of Shameful Sequels on Channel Awesome stated that Sheeba is "corny, messy, and poorly produced."
