= Ed Asner =

American actor (1929–2021)

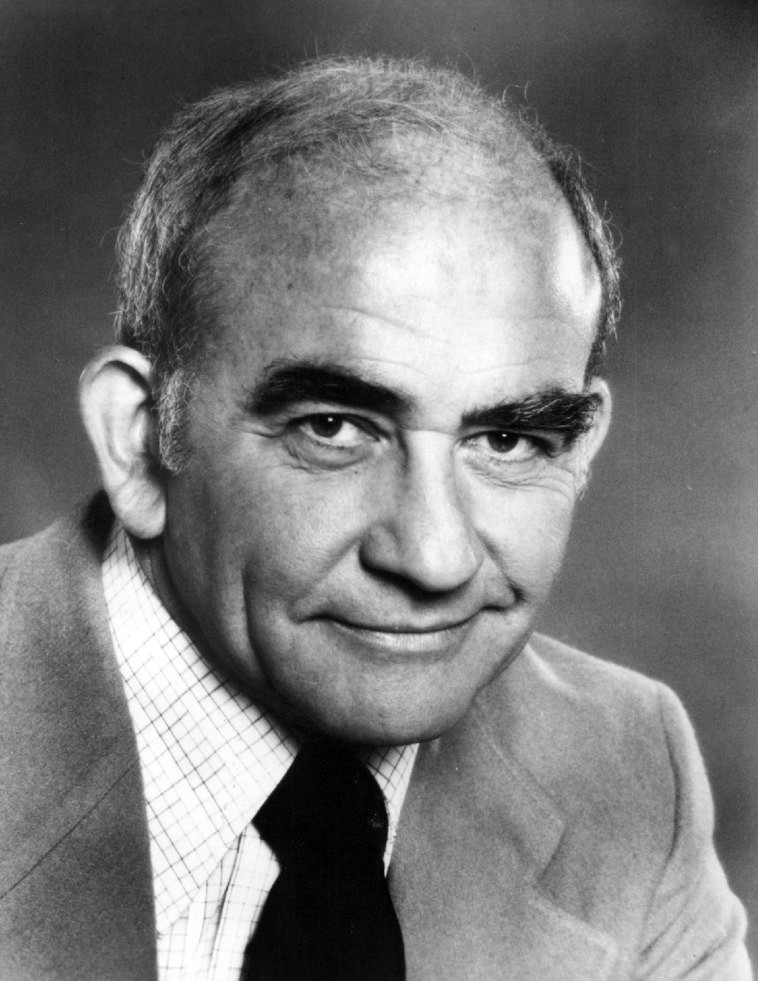
- Asner in 1977
- Born: Eddie Asner; November 15, 1929; Kansas City, Missouri, U.S.
- Died: August 29, 2021 (aged 91); Tarzana, California, U.S.
- Resting place: Sheffield Cemetery, Kansas City
- Occupation: Actor
- Years active: 1953–2021
- Known for: Lou Grant in The Mary Tyler Moore Show
- Works: Full list
- Political party: Democratic
- Spouses: Nancy Sykes (m. 1959; div. 1988) Cindy Gilmore (m. 1998; div. 2015)
- Children: 4
- Awards: Full list

President of the Screen Actors Guild
- In office November 3, 1981 – June 20, 1985
- Preceded by: William Schallert
- Succeeded by: Patty Duke

Eddie Asner (/ˈæznər/; November 15, 1929 – August 29, 2021), also credited as Edward Asner, was an American actor. He is most notable for portraying Lou Grant on the sitcom The Mary Tyler Moore Show (1970–1977) and drama Lou Grant (1977–1982), making him one of the few television actors to portray the same character in both a comedy and a drama.

Asner won seven Primetime Emmy Awards, the most of any male performer. Five were for portraying Lou Grant: three as Supporting Actor in a Comedy Television Series on The Mary Tyler Moore Show and two as Lead Actor in a Dramatic Television Series on the spin-off Lou Grant. The other two were for performances in the miniseries Rich Man, Poor Man (1976) and Roots (1977).

Asner acted in the films El Dorado (1966), They Call Me Mister Tibbs! (1970), Fort Apache, The Bronx (1981), JFK (1991), and Too Big to Fail (2011). He also played Santa Claus in several films and voiced Carl Fredricksen in the Pixar animated film Up (2009).

Asner starred in the ABC sitcom Thunder Alley (1994–1995), and Michael: Every Day (2011–2017). He also acted extensively in numerous television series such as The Practice, Studio 60 on the Sunset Strip, The Good Wife, Cobra Kai, Briarpatch, Working Class, and Dead to Me. He also voiced J. Jonah Jameson in Spider-Man: The Animated Series (1994–1998), Hudson in Gargoyles (1994–1997), and Ed Wuncler Sr. in The Boondocks (2005–2014).

== Early life and education ==
Asner was born November 15, 1929, in Kansas City, Missouri, and grew up in Kansas City, Kansas. His parents, Lizzie (née Seliger; 1885–1967), a housewife, and Morris David Asner (1879–1957), were Ashkenazi Jewish immigrants from Lithuania and Ukraine who ran a second-hand shop and junkyard. His four older siblings were Ben J. Asner (1915–1986), Eve Asner (1916–2014), Esther Edelman (1919–2014) and Labe Asner (1923–2017). He was raised in an Orthodox Jewish family and given the Hebrew name Yitzhak (יִצְחָק).

Asner attended Wyandotte High School in Kansas City, Kansas, and the University of Chicago. He studied journalism in Chicago until a professor advised him there was little money to be made in the profession. He had been working in a steel mill, but he quickly switched to drama, debuting as the martyred Thomas Becket in a campus production of T. S. Eliot's Murder in the Cathedral. He eventually dropped out of school, going to work as a taxi driver, worked on the assembly line for General Motors, and other odd jobs before being drafted in the military in 1951.

Asner served with the United States Army Signal Corps from 1951 to 1953 during the Korean War and appeared in plays that toured army bases in Europe.

== Career ==
=== 1955–1969: Early work and television roles ===
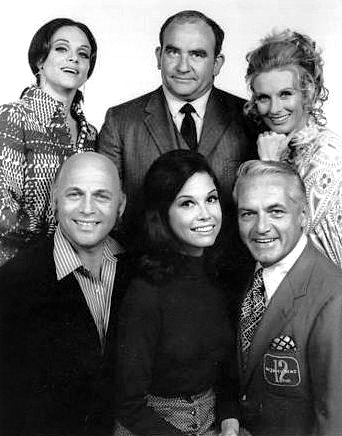
Cast of The Mary Tyler Moore Show in 1970, with Asner in center rear

Following his military service, Asner helped found the Playwrights Theatre Company in Chicago, but left for New York City before members of that company regrouped as the Compass Players in the mid-1950s. He later made frequent guest appearances with the successor to Compass, The Second City. In New York City, Off-Broadway roles included Jonathan Jeremiah Peachum in the revival of Threepenny Opera and in Otway's Venice Preserv'd in late 1955. Asner scored his first Broadway role in Face of a Hero alongside Jack Lemmon in 1960, and began to make inroads as a television actor, having made his TV debut in 1957 on Studio One. In two notable performances on television, Asner played Detective Sgt. Thomas Siroleo in the 1963 episode of The Outer Limits titled "It Crawled Out of the Woodwork" and the reprehensible ex-premier Brynov in the 1965 Voyage to the Bottom of the Sea episode "The Exile". He made his film debut in 1962, in the Elvis Presley vehicle Kid Galahad.

Before landing his role with Mary Tyler Moore, Asner guest-starred in television series including four episodes of The Untouchables starring Robert Stack, the syndicated crime drama Decoy, starring Beverly Garland, two episodes of Naked City in 1961, and Route 66 in 1962 (the episode titled "Welcome to the Wedding") as Custody Officer Lincoln Peers. He was cast on Jack Lord's ABC drama series Stoney Burke and in the series finale of CBS's The Reporter, starring Harry Guardino. He also appeared on Mr. Novak, Ben Casey, Gunsmoke, Mission: Impossible, The Outer Limits, The Fugitive, and The Invaders. In 1963, Asner appeared as George Johnson on The Virginian in the episode "Echo of Another Day". In 1968 he was the villain Furman Crotty in the Wild Wild West episode "The Night of the Amnesiac".

=== 1970–1982: The Mary Tyler Moore Show and Lou Grant ===
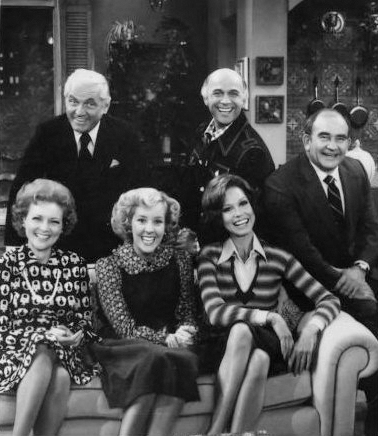
Publicity photo of the cast of The Mary Tyler Moore Show in 1977. From left standing: Ted Knight (Ted Baxter), Gavin McLeod (Murray Slaughter), Ed Asner (Lou Grant). Seated: Betty White (Sue Ann Nivens), Georgia Engel (Georgette Baxter), Mary Tyler Moore (Mary Richards).

Asner was best known for his character Lou Grant, who was first introduced on The Mary Tyler Moore Show in 1970. In 1977, after Moore's series ended, Asner's character was given his own show, Lou Grant (1977–82). In contrast to the Mary Tyler Moore series, a thirty-minute award-winning comedy about television journalism, the Lou Grant series was an hour-long award-winning drama about newspaper journalism. For his role as Grant, Asner was one of only two actors to win an Emmy Award for a sitcom and a drama for the same role (the second being Uzo Aduba). In addition he made appearances as Lou Grant on two other shows: Rhoda and Roseanne. Other television series starring Asner in regular roles include Thunder Alley, The Bronx Zoo, and Studio 60 on the Sunset Strip. He also starred in one episode of the Western series Dead Man's Gun (1997), as well as portraying art smuggler August March in an episode of the original Hawaii Five-O (1975) and reprised the role in the Hawaii Five-0 (2012) remake. He also appeared as a streetwise veteran police officer in an episode of the 1973 version of Police Story.

Asner was acclaimed for his role in the ABC miniseries Roots, as Captain Davies, the morally conflicted captain of the Lord Ligonier, the slave ship that brought Kunta Kinte to America. The role earned Asner an Emmy Award, as did the similarly dark role of Axel Jordache in the miniseries Rich Man, Poor Man (1976). In contrast, he played a former pontiff in the lead role of Papa Giovanni: Ioannes XXIII (Pope John XXIII 2002), an Italian television film for RAI.

=== 1983–2009: Established actor and voice work ===
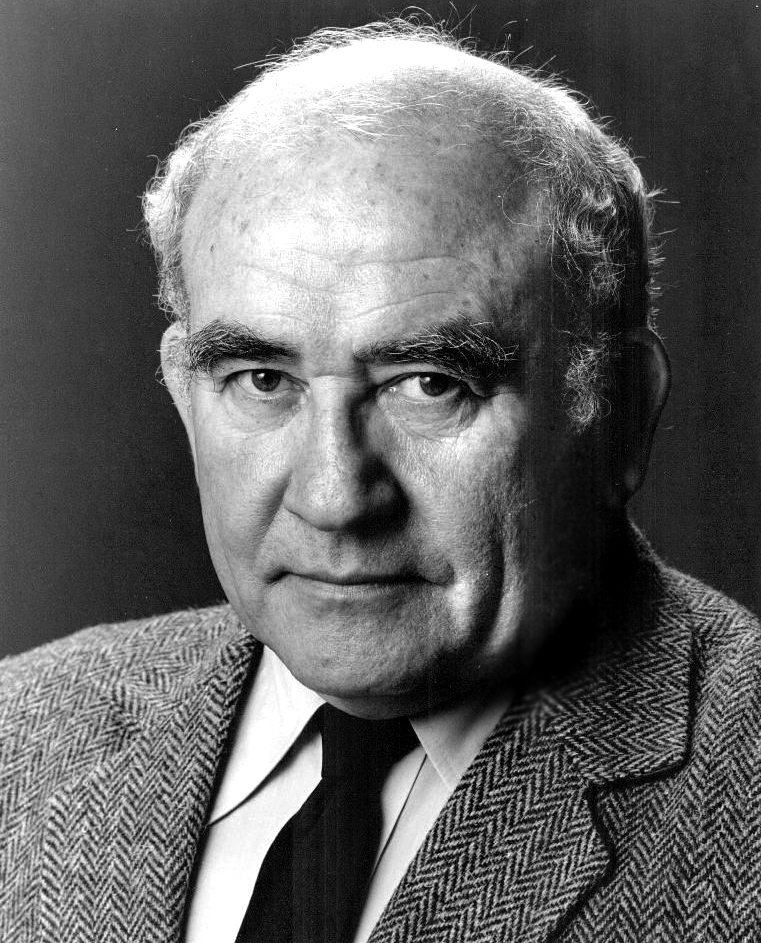
Asner in 1985

Asner had an extensive voice acting career. In 1987, he played the eponymous character, George F. Babbitt, in the L.A. Classic Theatre Works' radio theater production of Sinclair Lewis' novel Babbitt. Asner won one Audie Award and was nominated for two Grammy Awards and an additional Audie for his audiobook work. He also provided the voices for Joshua on Joshua and the Battle of Jericho (1986) for Hanna-Barbera, J. Jonah Jameson on the 1990s animated television series Spider-Man: The Animated Series (1994–98); Hoggish Greedly on Captain Planet and the Planeteers (1990–95); Hudson on Gargoyles (1994–96); Jabba the Hutt on the radio version of Star Wars; Master Vrook from Star Wars: Knights of the Old Republic and its sequel; Roland Daggett on Batman: The Animated Series (1992–94); Cosgrove on Freakazoid!; Ed Wuncler on The Boondocks (2005–2014); and Granny Goodness in various DC Comics animated series. He also voiced Napoleon, Cornelia's younger sister's cat in the Disney show W.I.T.C.H. (2004–06), and Kid Potato, the Butcher's dad in the PBS Kids hit show WordGirl (2007–2015). He was nominated for a Daytime Emmy Award for Outstanding Performer in an Animated Program but lost to Eartha Kitt for Nick Jr.'s Wonder Pets!. Asner provided the voice of American orator Edward Everett in the 2017 documentary film The Gettysburg Address.

Asner provided the voice of the main protagonist Carl Fredricksen in the Academy Award-winning Pixar film Up (2009). He received critical acclaim for the role, with one critic going so far as to suggest "They should create a new category for this year's Academy Award for Best Vocal Acting in an Animated Film and name Asner as the first recipient." During the mid- to late-2000s he appeared in a recurring segment on The Tonight Show with Jay Leno, entitled "Does This Impress Ed Asner?"

Asner appeared in several Hallmark movies, and he was nominated for an Emmy for the 2006 Hallmark Original Movie The Christmas Card.

In 2001, Asner was the recipient of the Screen Actors Guild Life Achievement Award. Asner won more Emmy Awards for performing than any other male actor (seven, including five for the role of Lou Grant). In 1996, he was inducted into the Academy of Television Arts & Sciences Hall of Fame.

=== 2010–2021: Later roles ===
In June 2010, Asner was cast in a Country Music Television comedy pilot, Regular Joe. In July 2010, Asner completed recording sessions for Shattered Hopes: The True Story of the Amityville Murders; a documentary on the 1974 DeFeo murders in Amityville, New York. Asner served as the narrator for the film, which covers a forensic analysis of the murders, the trial in which 23-year-old DeFeo son Ronald DeFeo Jr., was convicted of the killings, and the subsequent "haunting" story which is revealed to be a hoax. Also in 2010, Asner played the title role in FDR, a stage production about the life of Franklin Delano Roosevelt; he subsequently continued to tour the play throughout the country. In January 2011, Asner took a supporting role on CMT's first original sitcom Working Class. He made an appearance in the independent comedy feature Not Another B Movie, and had a role as billionaire Warren Buffett in HBO's economic drama Too Big to Fail (2011). In 2013, he guest starred as Mr. Finger in The Crazy Ones.

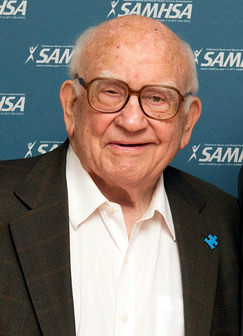
Asner at the 2015 Substance Abuse and Mental Health Services Administration Awards

Asner also provided voice-over narration for many documentaries and films about social activism, including Tiger by the Tail, a documentary film detailing the efforts of Eric Mann and the Campaign to keep General Motors' Van Nuys assembly plant running. He also recorded for a public radio show and podcast, Playing On Air, appearing in Warren Leight's The Final Interrogation of Ceaucescu's Dog with Jesse Eisenberg, and Mike Reiss's New York Story. Asner was the voice-over narrator for the 2016 documentary Behind the Fear: The Hidden Story of HIV. A 2014 documentary titled My Friend Ed, directed by Sharon Baker, focused on the actor's life and career. It won Best Short Documentary at the New York City Independent Film Festival. During interviews for a 2019 book on the history of Chicago theater, Asner told the author he preferred to be credited for his work as "Edward" rather than "Ed" because he felt the longer name held the page or screen better.

In 2018, Asner was cast in the Netflix dark comedy, Dead to Me, which premiered on May 3, 2019. Asner also had a recurring guest role in the 2018–2025 series Cobra Kai, portraying Johnny Lawrence's step-father, Sid Weinberg, in seasons one and three. A memorial tribute to Asner preceded the credits in Cobra Kai season 4, episode 1, "Let's Begin". In 2020 he guest starred in an episode of the eleventh and final season of Modern Family and in 2021 played himself in a sketch on Let's Be Real. A 2019 feature documentary by Kurt Jacobsen and Warren Leming entitled Ed Asner: On Stage and Off premiered at the American Documentary Film Festival in Palm Springs, which Asner attended. In 2013, he played Santa in Christmas on the Bayou.

Beginning in 2016, Asner took on the role of Holocaust survivor Milton Saltzman in Jeff Cohen's acclaimed play The Soap Myth in a reading at Lincoln Center's Bruno Walter Theatre in New York City. He subsequently toured for the next three years in "concert readings" of the play in more than a dozen cities across the United States. In 2019, PBS flagship station WNET filmed the concert reading at New York's Center for Jewish History for their All Arts channel and posted online for free.

In the week before his death, Asner told his frequent collaborators, Greg Palast and Leni Badpenny, that he soon would be doing three one-act plays.

=== 2021–present: Posthumous releases ===
Asner had completed several roles in a number of TV series and films at the time of his death in August 2021, including three of his final productions released posthumously on the Disney+ streaming service. He returned to reprise his voice role as Carl Fredricksen from the Pixar film Up in the Disney+ animated miniseries of shorts Dug Days (2021), which premiered three days after his death. Asner's cameo appearance as the Ghost of Claude in the Halloween special Muppets Haunted Mansion (2021) was posthumous, and he provided the voice of Grandpa Heffley in the Disney+ animated film adaptation Diary of a Wimpy Kid: Rodrick Rules (2022), released over a year after his death. The final short film in the Dug Days series, Carl's Date, which includes Asner's recorded voice-over performance as Carl Fredricksen, did not premiere on Disney+, but it was released separately in theaters along with the Pixar animated feature film Elemental on June 16, 2023, nearly two years after his death and also served as the finale of the Up franchise. These were Asner's last acting works overall for Disney and were all dedicated to his memory.

Asner also appeared posthumously in Deadly Draw (2023), A Fargo Christmas Story (2023), and Altered Reality (2024). At least two other projects, which would include Asner's final film roles, have yet to announce release dates: Scarlett (a television drama film) and Unplugged (an animated film).

== Activism ==
=== Politics ===
He played a prominent role in the 1980 SAG strike. He was also active in a variety of other causes, such as the movement to free Mumia Abu-Jamal and the movement to establish California One Care, single-payer health care in California, for which he created a television advertisement. He endorsed Dennis Kucinich in the 2004 United States presidential election, and Barack Obama during the 2008 United States presidential election. He was formerly a member of the Democratic Socialist Organizing Committee (DSOC), as well as a member of DSOC's successor, the Democratic Socialists of America.

The sudden cancellation of Lou Grant in 1982 was the subject of much controversy. The show had high ratings, being in the ACNielsen top ten throughout its final month on the air. However, the CBS television network declined to renew it. Asner believed that his left-wing political views, as well as the publicity surrounding them, were the actual root causes for the show's cancellation. In 2011, Asner endorsed Democratic candidate Marcy Winograd who finished 4th in the 16-candidate primary behind eventual winner Janice Hahn, in California's 36th congressional district special election. From 2011 to 2015, Asner worked with filmmaker Nicole Zwiren on the feature-length documentary Behind the Fear, which addressed HIV/AIDS denialism. The film was released in 2016 with Asner as the narrator.

Asner endorsed 9/11 conspiracy theories, including voicing qualified support for the 9/11 truth movement. In 2004, he signed a statement released by the group 9/11 Truth that included a call for a new investigation into some elements of the September 11 attacks that he questioned. Asner confirmed his support for the statement in 2009. In April 2004, Asner wrote an open letter to "peace and justice leaders" encouraging them to demand "full 9–11 truth" through the organization 9-11 Visibility Project. In 2011, Asner hosted the Architects & Engineers for 9/11 Truth documentary on the collapse of 7 World Trade Center, which endorses the theory that the building was taken down by controlled demolition. Asner also narrated the documentary film The Oil Factor: Behind the War on Terror.

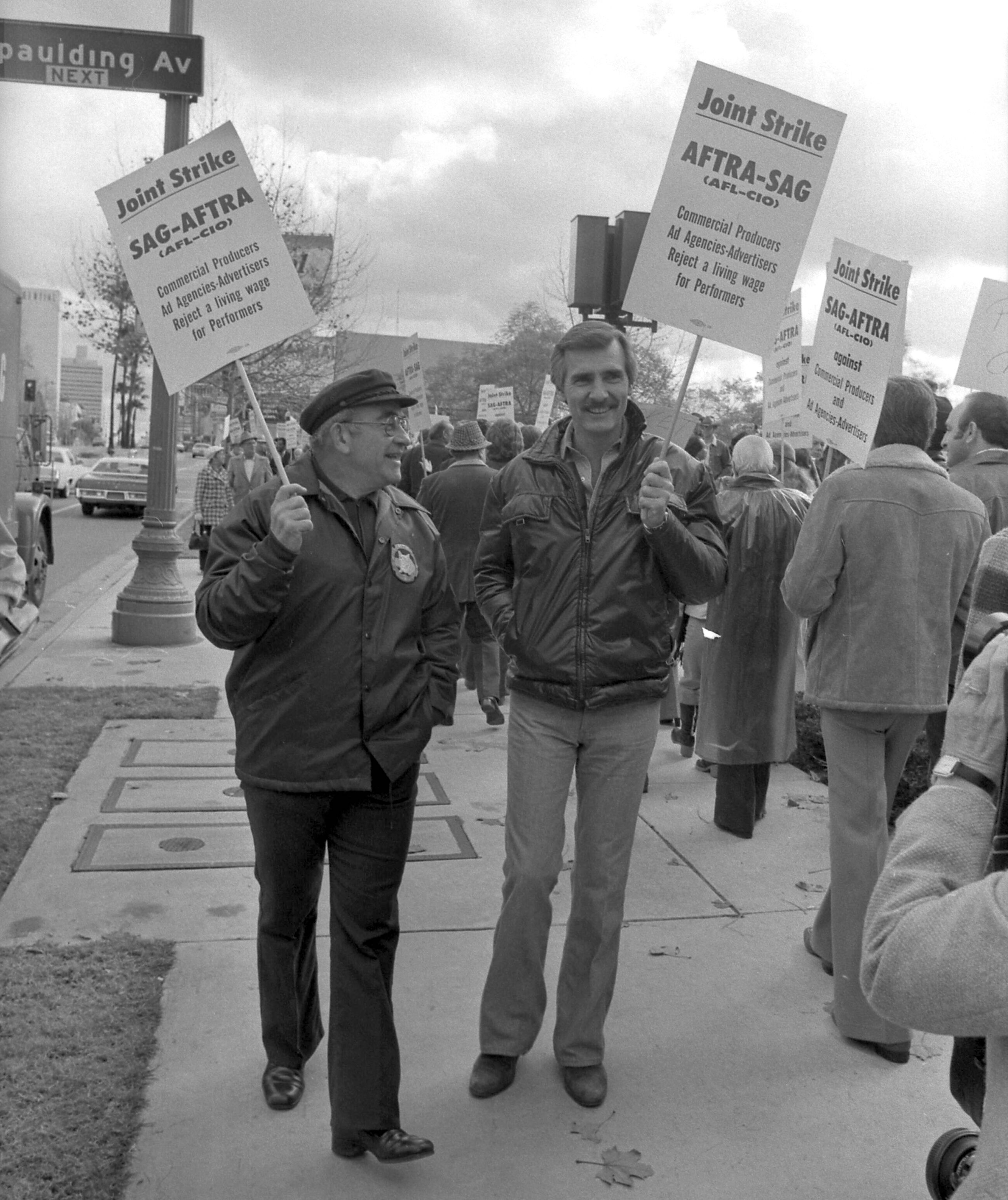
Asner and Dennis Weaver picketing during an advertising agency strike in Los Angeles, 1978

=== Nonprofit organizations ===
Asner was on the Entertainment Board of Directors for The Survivor Mitzvah Project, a nonprofit organization dedicated to providing direct emergency aid to elderly and impoverished Holocaust survivors in Eastern Europe. Asner was a member of the Comic Book Legal Defense Fund, a free speech organization that is dedicated to protecting comic book creators and retailers from prosecutions based on content. He served as an advisor to the Rosenberg Fund for Children, an organization founded by the children of Julius and Ethel Rosenberg, which provides benefits for the children of political activists, and was a board member for the wildlife conservation organization Defenders of Wildlife. Asner also sat on the advisory board of Exceptional Minds, a nonprofit school and computer animation studio for young adults on the autism spectrum.

Asner was a supporter of Humane Borders, an organization based in Tucson, Arizona, which maintains water stations in the Sonoran Desert for use by undocumented migrants, with the goal of preventing deaths by dehydration and exposure. He was the master of ceremonies at that organization's volunteer dinner in fall 2017.

In November 2017, the Ed Asner Family Center was founded by Asner's son, Matt, and daughter-in-law, Navah Paskowitz. The Center provides arts and vocational enrichment, counseling services, support groups, and camps for individuals with special needs and their families.

=== SAG involvement ===
Asner served two terms as president of the Screen Actors Guild, in which capacity during the 1980s he opposed United States policy in Central America, working closely with the Alliance for Survival.

On March 30, 2012, the Screen Actors Guild (SAG) and the American Federation of Television and Radio Artists (AFTRA) completed a merger of equals, forming a new union SAG-AFTRA. Asner was adamantly opposed to the merger, arguing that it would destroy the SAG's health plan and disempower actors. Asner and a group of fellow actors and voice-actors, such as Michael Bell, Clancy Brown, Wendy Schaal, her former stepmother Valerie Harper, Martin Sheen, Ed Harris, and Nancy Sinatra, filed and later dropped a lawsuit against SAG president Ken Howard and several SAG vice presidents, seeking to have the merger overturned and to have the two unions separated to their pre-merger organizations.

=== Community theater ===
In 2021, Asner traveled to Monte Rio, California, to support the reopening, revitalization, and shifted focus of the local Monte Rio Theater.

== Personal life and death ==
Asner was married to Nancy Lou Sykes from 1959 to 1988. They had three children, twins Matthew and Liza, and Kate. In 1987, he had a son named Charles with Carol Jean Vogelman. Asner was a parent and a grandparent to autistic children and was involved with the 501(c)(3) nonprofit organization Autism Speaks. He also served as a board member and adviser for Aspiritech, a nonprofit organization that trains high-functioning autistic persons to test software and perform quality-assurance services for companies.

Asner became engaged to producer Cindy Gilmore in 1991. They married on August 2, 1998. Gilmore filed for legal separation on November 7, 2007. Asner filed for divorce in 2015.

Asner died of natural causes at his home in the Tarzana neighborhood of Los Angeles, California, on August 29, 2021, at the age of 91. He was buried at Sheffield Cemetery in Kansas City, Missouri, on September 12. Several publications, including The New York Times, Rolling Stone and NME, included a full name of "Edward David Asner" in articles about his death.

Numerous celebrities paid tribute to Asner, including Maureen McCormick, George Takei, Mark Hamill, Michael McKean, Bradley Whitford, Josh Gad, Mia Farrow, Andy Richter, Katie Couric, Denis O'Hare, Mira Sorvino, Eric Stonestreet, Niecy Nash, Yvette Nicole Brown, Michael Moore, Rosario Dawson, Rosanna Arquette, Ben Stiller, The Muppets, William Baldwin, Greg Weisman, William Zabka, Ralph Macchio, Martin Kove, Bob Peterson, Bill Farmer, and Zooey Deschanel.
