= The Christmas Card =

2006 television film directed by Stephen Bridgewater

- Written by: Joany Kane
- Directed by: Stephen Bridgewater
- Starring: John Newton; Alice Evans
- Composer: Roger Bellon
- Country of origin: United States
- Original language: English

Production
- Executive producers: Larry Levinson; Robert Halmi Jr.
- Producers: Randy Pope; Lincoln Lageson
- Cinematography: Maximo Munzi
- Editor: Craig Bassett
- Running time: 84 minutes
- Production companies: Alpine Medien Productions; Larry Levinson Productions

Original release
- Network: Hallmark Channel
- Release: December 2, 2006

The Christmas Card is an American romantic drama television film directed by Stephen Bridgewater and written by Joany Kane. The film stars John Newton and Alice Evans, with Lois Nettleton, Peter Jason, Ben Weber, Vaughn Armstrong, and Ed Asner in supporting roles. It follows the story of a career soldier who is deeply touched by a Christmas card he receives while serving in Afghanistan. The film premiered on Hallmark Channel on December 2, 2006, and earned Asner a Primetime Emmy Award nomination for his performance.

== Plot ==
In the midst of war in Afghanistan, U.S. Army Sergeant Cody Cullen (John Newton) is given a Christmas card from a fellow soldier who had received it from his hometown, Nevada City, California. The card was sent by Faith Spelman (Alice Evans). As months pass, the card never leaves his side. Cody, who has no family, and whose father was killed during the Vietnam War, is deeply affected when the soldier who gave him the card is killed. A few weeks before Christmas, Cody travels to see the soldier's fiancée, back in Nevada City. Just as he is about to leave town, Cody runs into Faith at a local luncheonette, where they happened to have placed identical orders. They part, but on his way out of town, Cody saves Faith's father, Luke (Ed Asner), from being hit by a speeding car. Luke takes a liking to Cody and convinces him to stay on as temporary help at his family's logging company. Paul (Ben Weber), Faith's longtime boyfriend who travels much of the time, and who selfishly wants Faith to move away from her close-knit family in Nevada City, arrives to meet her.

Complicating matters, Cody has fallen in love with Faith and despite her attempts to ignore the feeling, they end up sharing a kiss. When Paul unexpectedly asks Faith to marry him, she says yes. Even so, Paul downplays Faith's wish to stay near her family in the "boondocks". This all comes to a head on Christmas Eve. On the church steps, Cody and Paul meet, and Cody admits that he loves Faith, but accepts that she's going to marry Paul instead, and hopes that Paul is marrying Faith "for all the right reasons". In church, in spite of the presence of Paul by her side, Faith keeps looking for Cody who has decided to leave. Paul notices and they step out and decide to part ways.

Early on Christmas Day, Cody places a Christmas card on the family Christmas tree, which will direct the family to the Christmas present, a wooden bench (inscribed with "Where the Magic Begins") that he has been building to mark the family's favorite spot at a nearby lake where he and Faith first kissed. Cody leaves a Christmas card for Faith with a handwritten note, which she reads aloud. In the note, Cody confesses his love for Faith, and says goodbye. She asks her father whether it was her letter that brought Cody to Nevada City, to which Luke answers: no, you did. In the movie's final scene, Faith finds Cody at the local Vietnam War veterans' memorial. She chastises him for not saying goodbye, but before she can complete the sentence he kisses her, and she embraces him.

== Cast ==
- John Haymes Newton as (MSG) Cody Cullen
- Alice Evans as Faith Spelman
- Ed Asner as Luke Spelman
- Peter Jason as Uncle Richard
- Lois Nettleton as Rosie Spelman
- Ben Weber as Paul
- Andrew Sanford as Sammy
- Kate Hamon as Selma
- Glorinda Marie as Molly
- Charlie Holliday as Reverend Ives
- Kurt Johnson as Eric
- Brooke Davis as Liddy
- Nick Ballard as Jonesy
- Chad Michael Collins as Lewis
- Brian Robinson as Edo

== Press ==
Hallmark Channel collaborated with Operation Dear Abby, who issued a special message in her column: "This holiday season – support the troops by sending a message to our servicemembers." The network also put together a national Cards for Troops campaign and a partnership with America Supports You to build support of Americans for the men and women of the U.S. Armed Services. Hallmark Channel also set up a satellite link to reunite Jennifer Parsley, a young woman from Porter, Texas who sent thousands of cards to troops through Operation Gratitude and in the process met serviceman Jeremy Harshman, who is deployed overseas.

== Reception ==
The movie ranked as Hallmark Channel’s highest-ever-rated telecast on the date of its premiere. The network also ranked #1 in Prime Time that day, making it the most-watched telecast on basic cable for the day.

== Awards and nominations ==
Year	Award	Category	Nominee	Result	Ref.
2007	59th Primetime Emmy Awards	Outstanding Supporting Actor in a Miniseries or Movie	Ed Asner	Nominated	

== See also ==
- List of Christmas films
